= Energy Traders Europe =

- Logo (until 2024)
- Abbreviation: EFET
- Formation: 1999; 27 years ago
- Type: Trade association
- Purpose: to promote and facilitate European energy trading in open, transparent and liquid wholesale markets
- Location: Amsterdam, Netherlands
- Region served: Europe
- Fields: Wholesale energy trading
- Members: 170 (2025)
- Board Chair: Giusi Squicciarini
- CEO: Mark Copley
- Website: energytraderseurope.org

Energy Traders Europe or EFET (formerly the European Federation of Energy Traders) is a trade association of European energy traders in markets for wholesale electricity and gas. EFET advocates policies and regulatory measures which allow electricity and gas trading to develop freely while encouraging good risk management practices and responsible corporate governance. In its role as a standard setting body, EFET aims to provide standard solutions to common aspects of wholesale energy transactions, such as contracting and data exchange.

EFET depends on the cooperation of grid operators, regulators, brokers, exchanges, and other relevant actors. Therefore, EFET maintains frequent contact and exchange with the European Commission, ACER, ENTSO-E, etc., and similar bodies at national/regional level. On national/regional level, EFET cooperates with other trading associations such as TOE for the Polish market or Energy Traders Deutschland for the German market.

== History ==
EFET was founded in 1999 in response to the liberalisation of electricity and gas markets within the European Union. As of 2024, the year of EFET's 25th anniversary, the association operates under the new name of Energy Traders Europe and has a new logo.

== Organisational structure ==
=== Market design, policy and regulation ===
EFET has three main committees dedicated to Electricity, Gas, and Market Regulation to conduct its advocacy work. The committees are supported by working groups that focus on specific/national/regional market design, policy, or regulatory issues. The committees and working groups identify barriers to energy trading across Europe and develop proposals for their effective removal, with the goal to foster efficient, harmonised, transparent, and liquid wholesale energy markets throughout the continent.

=== Contractual and transactional standardisation ===
The EFET Legal and Operations Committees and their working groups develop standardised solutions for recurring aspects of wholesale energy transactions. Their work delivers widely recognized and reliable contractual frameworks for physically settled wholesale energy trades, and establishes standardised data formats, content structures, and communication protocols to enable automated processing of lifecycle events in both cleared and OTC transactions.

== Contractual standards ==
EFET has published standard contracts for physically settled energy wholesale transactions, which are available in many languages, and which are claimed to have had substantial influence on legal OTC-standards in the liberalised energy markets in Europe and beyond:

- General Agreement Concerning the Delivery and Acceptance of Electricity
- General Agreement Concerning the Delivery and Acceptance of Natural Gas
- Credit Support Annex (CSA)
- Master Netting Agreements (MNA)
- Carbon Emission Allowances Appendices
- Individual Contracts for Biomass or Gas Capacity
- Standard documentation to trade various Renewable Certificates

EFET's standard contracts adopt the document architecture of ISDA Master Agreements, consisting of a master agreement (General Agreement), a schedule (Election Sheet), confirmations (evidencing single transactions), and credit support documentation (CSA), plus possible further appendices.

== Data standards ==
EFET's data standards facilitate the integration of internal and external business processes, with the goal to enable straight-through processing. Applying the standards is promised to enhance process efficiencies, reduce operational risks as well as transactional costs.

EFET's data standards are designed, maintained and released as open standards with the intention to ensure interoperability.

=== Data standards (listed in release order) ===
- electronic Confirmation Matching (eCM) for the exchange and validation of electronic trade confirmations, October 2002
- electronic Position Matching (ePM), for the exchange and comparison of nomination data, Juni 2008
- eCredit Matrix Standard for the exchange of counterparty credit limits with brokers, July 2009
- Communications Standard for authenticated, confidential, unalterable, and undeniable message exchange, September 2010
- Commodity product Markup Language (CpML) as a vocabulary for exchanging standardized messages for commodity trading and reporting processes, April 2012 (released as version 4, spun off from the work on eCM and eXRP standards), CpML was governed by the CpML Foundation from 2013 (version 5.0) until 2023 (version 6.5)
- electronic eXchange Related Processes (eXRP) for the registration of off-exchange clearable products, September 2012
- electronic Portfolio Reconciliation (ePR) for the reconciliation of portfolios under EMIR, March 2014
- electronic Regulatory Reporting (eRR) for reporting new trades and lifecycle events to regulatory databases, March 2015
- electronic Settlement Matching (eSM) for the exchange and comparison of settlement data and invoices, February 2019

Maintenance of the ePM, eXRP, and ePR standards is suspended due to lack of market adoption (in 2025).

=== EFETnet ===
EFETnet was set up in 2003 as a cost sharing vehicle of EFET's member companies and turned into a subsidiary organisation in 2005 with the objective to realise and operate EFET’s data exchange and processing standards. In this role, EFETnet supported the development and maintenance of EFET's data standards and operated the central matching hub for electronic confirmation matching.

In 2011, EFETnet together with DTCC were selected by ISDA to build a global trade repository for commodity over-the-counter derivatives trade types with the objective to fulfil current and future regulations. The Global Trade Repository for Commodities went live in January 2012 and received first trades in April 2012. It was later integrated with other repositories of DTCC to report under Dodd-Frank. In 2014, EFETnet launched its regulatory reporting service under EMIR, providing a standard interface to DTCC, REGIS-TR and UnaVista trade repositories. In 2015, EFETnet was amongst the first fully approved Registered Reporting Mechanisms (RRM) under REMIT.

In 2017, EFET has divested its ownership in EFETnet to the subsidiary’s managing director.

== Members ==
As of January 2014, EFET had a total of 126 member companies, of which 37 were associate members.

ISO country code	Country	Members (Regular and Associate)
AT	Austria	KELAG, E & T Energie, EconGas, Tiwag, Verbund Trading
BE	Belgium	GDF Suez Electrabel
BG	Bulgaria	NEK EAD
HR	Croatia	HEP Trade
CZ	Czech Republic	B.E.K. Group, MND, CEZ, Lumius, Vemex
DK	Denmark	Neas Energy, Danske Commodities, DONG
FI	Finland	Fortum, RAO Nordic
FR	France	EDF Trading, Société Générale, Engie Global Markets
DE	Germany	Bayerngas Energy Trading, Deutsche Bank, E.ON Energy Trading, EnBW, MVV Trading, RheinEnergie, RWE Supply & Trading, Stadtwerke München, Syneco Trading, Trailstone, Trianel, VNG, Wingas, aet, Commerzbank, Currenta, Dong Energy Markets, EWE Trading, Gas-Union, Securing Energy for Europe, Gelsenwasser, GETEC, Mark-E, Stadtwerke Hannover, Stadtwerke Leipzig
GR	Greece	Aegean Power, DEPA, Public Power Corporation
HU	Hungary	MOL Energy Trade, MVM Trade
IT	Italy	Acquirente Unico, TEI Energy, A2A Trading, Edison, Enel Energy Europe, Enel Trade, ENI, ENOI, Europe Energy, GALA Energia, Gas Plus Italiana, Hera Trading, Sorgenia, YouTrade Gruppo Innowatio
LU	Luxembourg	Enovos Luxembourg
NL	Netherlands	Delta, Eneco, GasTerra
NO	Norway	Statkraft Energi
PL	Poland	PGE, PGNiG, Tauron Polska Energia
PT	Portugal	EDP Energía, Galp Gás Natural
RO	Romania	SNGN Romgaz, Energy Holding
RS	Serbia	EPS, Rudnap group
SK	Slovak Republic	Slovenske Elektrarne
SI	Slovenia	Elektro Energija, GEN-I, HSE
ES	Spain	Endesa, Energya VM, Gas Natural Fenosa, Iberdrola
SE	Sweden	Vattenfall
CH	Switzerland	Alpiq, Axpo, Azienda Elettrica Ticinese, BKW FMB, Cargill International, CKW, DufEnergy Trading, Gunvor International, Mercuria Energy Trading, Novatek, NValue, Repower, SET Swiss Energy Trading, Vitol
GB	United Kingdom	Barclays Capital, BP, BG International, BNP Paribas, Centrica, Citigroup, ConocoPhillips, Credit Suisse, Drax Power, DTEK Power Trade, EFT Group, ExxonMobil, Freepoint Commodities Europe, Gazprom, Goldman Sachs, Koch Energy Europe, Macquarie Bank, Merrill Lynch, Morgan Stanley, Noble Clean Fuels, Petronas Energy Trading, Shell Energy Trading, Statoil, Total

== See also ==
=== Related context ===
- Energy law
- Energy liberalisation
- Energy market and Energy derivative
- Commodity market
- Natural gas prices
- Electricity market
- Electricity Directive 2019
- Renewable energy in the European Union
- Power purchase agreement
- Energy Community

=== Related organisations ===
- Council of European Energy Regulators
- Depository Trust & Clearing Corporation
- EurObserv'ER
- European Network of Transmission System Operators for Electricity
- European Network of Transmission System Operators for Gas
- International Swaps and Derivatives Association
