= Electronic Regulatory Reporting =

Electronic Regulatory Reporting (eRR) is a universal regulatory reporting solution based on legal and technical standards governed by the Energy Traders Europe (formerly European Federation of Energy Traders) that allow users to report transactions and lifecycle events to multiple regulatory reporting regimes via a uniform interface and a single message submitted in the Commodity product Markup Language (CpML).

eRR standardizes workflows and message flows to notify multiple regulatory databases independent of their data formats, codification schemes, transmission protocols and technical interfaces. eRR supports reporting as a counterparty to a transaction or on behalf of a counterparty or as a third-party reporting agent. eRR is an open standard, i.e., openly accessible and implementable by anyone. The eRR technical standard is complemented with reporting scheme-specific legal standards, which are technology-agnostic and thus eRR-independent, to warrant compliant regulatory reporting by all involved parties. eRR aims to facilitate the automation of reporting processes and thus to minimize risks and costs.

eRR overcomes several regulatory reporting challenges of energy traders, such as monitoring of data reported by other parties to fulfil their obligation to check completeness, accuracy, and timelines of the data, without the need to sign into different systems to check what has been reported; using CpML as a standardised electronic representation of trades, masking the varying deal representations in different reporting repositories; and finally, clearly defining which party has responsibility for reporting which pieces of information by means of a standard agreement for delegated reporting.

== History ==
EFETnet, the operational services arm of the European Federation of Energy Traders, started work on universal reporting services in 2011 when it won a joint bid with DTCC to build a global solution for commodity repositories for ISDA. The collaboration was perceived to "bring together EFETnet's secure data communications and post trade processing capabilities with DTCC's repository and regulatory reporting infrastructure" and delivered the first operating global repository for OTC commodity swaps, called Global Trade Repository for Commodities (GTRfC). After golive of ODRF reporting for oil swaps in 2012, services of GTRfC were integrated into the DTCC Data Repository before full Dodd-Frank reporting for commodities went live in 2013.

In response to EMIR and REMIT, EFETnet kicked-off a project with energy traders, brokers, and exchanges in 2013 to extend the electronic regulatory reporting solution to Europe.

In 2014, EFETnet launched its regulatory reporting service under EMIR, including portfolio reconciliation, valuation, and collateralisation, providing a standard interface to DTCC, REGIS-TR and UnaVista trade repositories. Major challenges of EMIR implementation were related to ambiguities concerning how fields should be populated in reporting templates, as well as how UTIs should be generated. Additionally, deal representations in reporting repositories differed, which EFETnet counteracted by using CpML as uniform data representation.

Implementing reporting under REMIT caused challenges due to the fragmentation of data across the parties involved in a transaction: Some information is held only by the trading venue, while other information only resides with the counterparty. Moreover, some parties are only involved at specific times in the deal lifecycle, which causes challenges for consistent reporting of lifecycle events. Finally, while parties are obliged to report their data, each party is free to choose their preferred reporting mechanism. Still, the responsibility of completeness, accuracy and timeliness of the reported data remains with the trader, while no means are provided to monitor the data that is sent to the regulator by the involved parties.

In response to that, EFET made the first major version of the electronic Regulatory Reporting (eRR) data processing standard public in 2015 and released standard agreements that define data exchange and data protection obligations between counterparties, trading venues, and reporting mechanisms. EFETnet developed "a single ‘viewing window’" linking trades, orders, and contracts reported from trading venues like MarexSpectron, Tradition Financial Services, and Griffin Markets to provide traders with a control point to monitor the data that others report on their behalf. EFETnet was amongst the first fully approved Registered Reporting Mechanisms (RRM) under REMIT.

In the course of 2015, the eRR solution was connected to other RRMs like Trayport's electronic trading platform and EEX. Other major exchanges refused the cooperation. In 2016, eRR had already over 1000 licensed users.

Latest versions 2.4 were released in 2024 in response to EMIR Refit and UKMIR.

== Characteristics ==
Message flows and processing steps in eRR

On top of the message choreography for receiving messages from different market participants, the eRR workflow defines a standard set of rules and filtering criteria that reflect the regulatory clauses of the supported reporting regimes which are applied to an incoming CpML message. Based on that, the eRR workflow generates a report with all regulatory regimes that the transaction is eligible for and submits messages to the respective trade repositories in the required format and way.

For REMIT, eRR also accepts native ACER XML messages which allows for data exchange with other market participants to overcome the data fragmentation problem where reporting data is scattered across several market participants. ACER XML messages are passed through without enrichment and mapping.

In addition to reporting as a counterparty to a transaction, eRR supports reporting on behalf of a counterparty and reporting as an agent that is commercially unconnected with the transaction. Therefore, eRR defines different roles, such as the 'process user' which uses the eRR process to report a transaction, the 'counterparty' from whose perspective the transaction is reported, and the 'other counterparty'. Reporting agents can be either of the counterparties ('counterparty agent'), the operator of the venue where the transaction was executed ('execution agent'), the clearer of the transaction ('clearing agent'; only applicable for cleared transaction), or a member of the corporate group that the counterparty belongs to ('internal agent').

Up to version 2.3, eRR incorporated rules to generate Unique Transaction Identifiers (UTIs) on behalf of process users. With release of version 2.4 in response to EMIR Refit which comes with own rules to generate UTIs, UTI generation is no longer part of the eRR process.

=== Scope ===
eRR offers a uniform interface to the following reporting regimes for the following asset classes, transactions types and actions.

Asset Classes	Transaction Types	Actions	Reporting Regimes
Commodity; Interest rate; Foreign exchange	OTC transactions; Cleared transactions	New trades; Amendments (modifications, nullifications, revisions, cancellations); Positions; Compression events	EMIR and UKMIR; MiFID II; REMIT

== Document structure ==
eRR documents are specified using CpML and contain two root level sections:

- Reporting (mandatory), indicating the reporting agent, the reporting scheme(s), the reporting action and event type, as well as the regulatory details depending on the reporting scheme(s);
- Transaction (mandatory choice), which must be either ETDTradeDetails for cleared transactions, FXTradeDetails for foreign exchange swaps, IRSTradeDetails for interest rate swaps, or TradeConfirmation or BrokerConfirmation for OTC commodity transactions where BrokerConfirmation provides additional broker-specific data fields.

=== Example document ===
<CpmlDocument>
    <Reporting>
        <Europe>
            <ProcessInformation>
                <ReportingRole>Internal_Agent</ReportingRole>
                <EMIRReportMode>Report</EMIRReportMode>
                <REMITReportMode>NoReport</REMITReportMode>
                <Position>false</Position>
                <Backload>false</Backload>
            </ProcessInformation>
            <Action>
                <ActionType>N</ActionType>
                <EventType>TRAD</EventType>
                <EventDate>2022-12-15</EventDate>
            </Action>
            <EURegulatoryDetails>
                ...regulatory details...
            </EURegulatoryDetails>
        </Europe>
    </Reporting>
    <ETDTradeDetails>
        ...trade details...
    </ETDTradeDetails>
</CpmlDocument>

== See also ==
- Trade Repositories
- CpML
- XBRL used in financial reporting
