= European Regulators' Group for Electricity and Gas =

The European Regulators' Group for Electricity and Gas (ERGEG) was an advisory group to the European Commission on internal energy market issues in Europe. ERGEG was set up by the European Commission to assist the commission in consolidating a single EU market for electricity and gas. ERGEG's members were the heads of the national energy regulatory authorities in the EU's 28 Member States. It was dissolved in 2011 when Agency for the Cooperation of Energy Regulators (ACER) took over its responsibilities.

== Foundation and Mission ==
ERGEG was set up by the European Commission (Decision of 11 November 2003 2003/796/EC) as its advisory body on internal energy market issues. It is made up of the national energy regulatory authorities of the EU Member States. Its purpose is to facilitate a consistent application, in all Member States, of the provisions set out in Internal Market in Electricity Directive|Directive 2003/54/EC, Directive 2003/55/EC and Regulation (EC) No 1228/2003, as well as of possible future EU legislation in the field of electricity and gas". With the Agency for the Cooperation of Energy Regulators (ACER) fully operational (since March 2011), ERGEG was dissolved by the European Commission (Commission Decision of 16 May 2011 repealing Decision 2003/796/EC) with effect from 1 July 2011. All past works relating to ERGEG activity (documents, reports, public consultations etc.) can be found on this website of the European Energy Regulators.

== Objectives and Functions ==
The role and aim of the ERGEG was to advise and assist the European Commission in ensuring the creation and smooth functioning of the internal energy market in Europe. ERGEG facilitates consultation, coordination and cooperation of national energy regulators contributing to a consistent application, in all Member States, of EU energy legislation. In advising the European Commission ERGEG worked transparently and was committed to best regulatory practice in terms of conducting its public consultations and engaging with stakeholders.

== From ERGEG to ACER ==
Since March 2011, a new organisation, the ACER became fully operational. ACER was established following the entry into force of third energy liberalisation legislative package (3rd Package) on 3 September 2009, has been assigned a series of tasks and responsibilities in relation to Europe's electricity and gas markets. ACER is a European Community body with legal personality, funded by the EU budget, with a staff of around 50 persons. With ACER fully operational, ERGEG was formally dissolved by the European Commission, with effect from 1 July 2011.

== ERGEG's work ==
Some examples of what ERGEG, the energy regulators' advisory group to the European Commission, did in practice:

- ERGEG Regional Initiatives

One of ERGEG's flagship projects was the Regional Initiatives, which it launched with the European Commission's backing in Spring 2006, in an effort to speed up the integration of Europe's national energy markets. The ERGEG Regional Initiatives establish 7 electricity and 3 regional gas markets in Europe as an intermediate step to the creation of a single, competitive EU market in electricity and gas. Since 2011, ACER takes over responsibility for the Regional Initiatives.

- Monitoring compliance with existing rules

ERGEG carried out extensive monitoring of compliance with rules (e.g. transparency, access, and implementation of consumer rights) and advised the European Commission accordingly. To assist in the practical implementation of the principles set out in the current energy laws, ERGEG developed Guidelines of Good Practice (GGPs) in certain areas. ERGEG GGPs are voluntary guidelines (i.e. not legally enforceable) which are developed in consultation with stakeholders.

- Advising the European Commission on legislative proposals

ERGEG advised and assisted the European Commission in the preparation of draft implementing measures in the field of electricity and gas. For example, ERGEG provided significant input to the European Commission in the preparation of its third energy liberalisation legislative package proposals (September 2007).

== Members ==
ERGEG members were the national energy regulatory authorities of the 28 EU Member States. The European Commission is represented at a high level. The energy regulators of the countries who are candidates for accession to the EU and the countries of the European Economic Area (EEA) participated in ERGEG meetings as Observers.

== See also ==
- European Network of Transmission System Operators for Electricity (ENTSO-E)
- European Network of Transmission System Operators for Gas (ENTSO-G)
- Agency for the Cooperation of Energy Regulators (ACER)
- Council of European Energy Regulators (CEER)
- Nord Pool
