= Nord Pool =

Pan-European electric power exchange

Coordinates: 59°54′55″N 10°38′18″E

Nord Pool AS
- Logotype since 2024

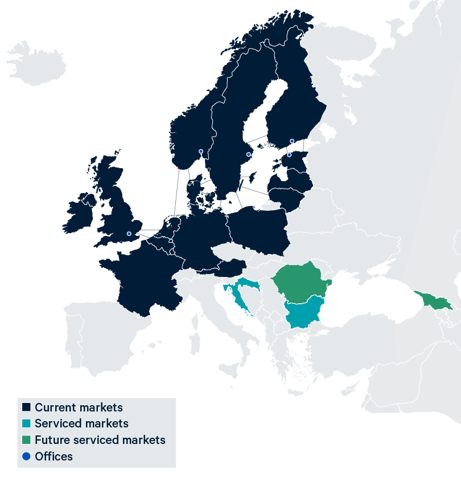
- Current markets (blue), expansion markets (green) and serviced markets (light blue)
- Type: Physical power exchange
- Location: Oslo, Norway
- Founded: 1993 (as Statnett Marked AS)
- Owner: Euronext (66%); TSO Holding (34%)
- Key people: Tom Darell (CEO); Christopher Topple (Chairman)
- Currency: NOK, SEK, DKK, EUR
- Commodities: Electric power
- Website: www.nordpoolgroup.com

Nord Pool AS is a pan-European power exchange. Nord Pool has its main office in Oslo and further offices in Stockholm, Helsinki, Tallinn and London. The company is owned by the European exchange operator Euronext as well as TSO Holding, which represents the continental Nordic and Baltic countries' transmission system operators (TSOs: Fingrid, Energinet, Statnett, Svenska Kraftnät, and Litgrid). Nord Pool has two subsidiaries, Nord Pool AB and Nord Pool Finland Oy.

== History ==
=== 1932–1991: Norwegian origins ===
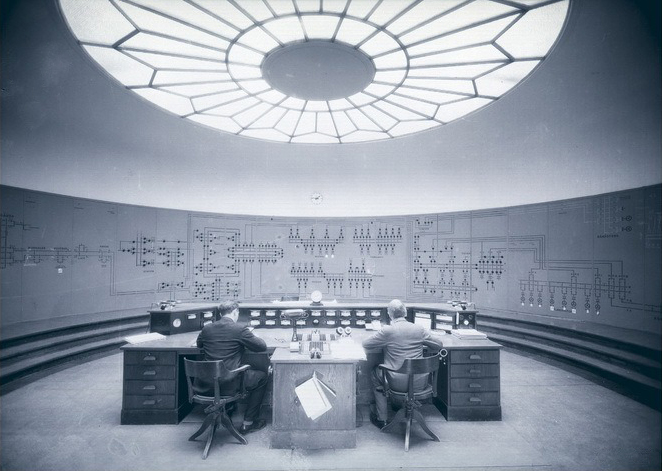
1934 control room of Foreningen Samkjøringen at Smestad in Oslo

Nord Pool traces its origin to Foreningen Samkjøringen (lit. the Coordination Association), a power exchange formed by eastern Norwegian electricity companies in 1932 on the initiative of Augustin Paus, and which soon came to encompass all the electricity companies in eastern Norway. In 1971, the exchange merged with the regional exchanges in other parts of Norway and became Samkjøringen av kraftverkene i Norge (literally the Coordination of Power Stations in Norway). As of 1988, it had 118 power companies as members.

=== 1991–2000: Nordic deregulation and integration ===
In 1991 the Norwegian parliament decided to deregulate the market for power trading. In 1993 Statnett Marked AS was established as an independent company.

Logotype of Nord Pool ASA (1996-2000). The company was established in 1996, spun off Nord Pool Spot AS (presently known as Nord Pool AS) in 2001 and was acquired by Nasdaq between 2007 and 2010.

In 1996, the Swedish electricity market was also deregulated. Statnett Marked AS was subsequently replaced by Nord Pool ASA, owned in equal parts by the Swedish and Norwegian transmission system operators (TSOs), Svenska Kraftnät and Statnett. This contributed to the unification of the two countries' electricity markets.

Finland as well as western and eastern Denmark joined Nord Pool ASA in 1998, 1999 and 2000, respectively.

=== 2000–present: Expansion in Europe ===
Logotype of Nord Pool ASA (2000-2010)

Logotype of Nord Pool Spot AS (2003-2016)

In 2000, Nord Pool ASA participated in establishing the Leipzig Power Exchange (now part of the European Energy Exchange). Nord Pool also supplied its technology to France's Powernext exchange.

Logotype of Nord Pool AS (2016-2024)

On 27 December 2001, Nord Pool ASA's spot market (derivatives and physical energy markets) activities were spun off into a new company, Nord Pool Spot AS. The remaining parts of Nord Pool ASA were later acquired by Nasdaq, and are presently known as Nasdaq Commodities. (Note: Nord Pool ASA's remaining subsidies Nord Pool Clearing, which dealt with clearing transactions, and Nord Pool Consulting - were acquired by Nasdaq OMX on 21 December 2007. On 17 March 2010, NASDAQ OMX announced it would acquire all shares of Nord Pool ASA. This did not include Nord Pool Spot AS, which continued physical electricity market trading operations independently. The deal was approved by market regulators on 31 May 2010. On 1 November 2010, Nord Pool ASA changed its name to NASDAQ OMX Oslo ASA and introduced a trade name NASDAQ OMX Commodities Europe. It is presently known as Nasdaq Commodities)

In 2005, Nord Pool Spot AS started trading and clearing of European Union (EU) emission allowances, becoming the first exchange to expand its activities into this area. The company expanded its activities to Germany by opening the KONTEK bidding area.

On 12 January 2010, Nord Pool Spot AS in cooperation with Nasdaq Commodities launched the N2EX power market in the United Kingdom.

On 2 February 2010, Nord Pool Spot signed an agreement with the Estonian national grid company Elering to create the Nord Pool Spot Estlink bidding area starting from 1 April 2010. Nord Pool Spot also delivered the technical solution for the Lithuanian market place Baltpool. On 9 June 2010, APX-ENDEX, Belpex and Nord Pool Spot agreed to create a cross-border intraday electricity market based on Nord Pool Spot's Elbas technology. The common intraday market then included the Nordic countries, the Baltic countries, Germany, the Netherlands, and Belgium.

In 2012, Nord Pool Spot opened a bidding area in Lithuania, and in 2013 the Latvian market was opened.

On 20 January 2016, Nord Pool Spot AS was rebranded to Nord Pool AS.

On 27 August 2019, Nord Pool started trading in France, Germany, Luxembourg, Belgium, Austria and the Netherlands, the result of a European Union decision to allow several power exchanges to operate in the same markets, increasing competition.

On 5 December 2019, Euronext announced that it would acquire 66% of Nord Pool. The acquisition was completed on 15 January 2020.

In 2021, Nord Pool launched day-ahead trading in Poland.

In 2022, a new mechanism was launched for hourly renewable energy certificates in Great Britain.

In 2025, Euronext acquired Nasdaq's Nordic power futures business.

== See also ==
=== Other pan-European exchanges ===
- European Energy Exchange
- European Power Exchange
- Euronext
- Nasdaq Nordic

=== Related technology companies ===
- European Market Coupling Company
- European Network of Transmission System Operators for Electricity (ENTSO-E)
- European Network of Transmission System Operators for Gas (ENTSO-G)
- Council of European Energy Regulators (CEER)
- European Regulators' Group for Electricity and Gas (ERGEG)

=== Regulations and agencies ===
- Regulation on Wholesale Energy Market Integrity and Transparency
- Agency for the Cooperation of Energy Regulators
- Energy Community
