= Remit =

Remit, REMIT, or derivations thereof may refer to:

== Terms related to remittance ==
- Remittance, a transfer of money by a worker foreign or not to an individual or entity in his or her home country or place
- Remittance advice, a letter sent by a customer to a supplier informing them that their invoice has been paid
- Remittance man, an emigrant in the 19th century, often to a British colony, supported or assisted by payment of money from their paternal home

== Acronyms ==
- REMIT, Regulation on Wholesale Energy Market Integrity and Transparency, a European Union regulation for energy markets
