= Commodity product Markup Language =

Commodity product Markup Language (CpML) is an industry standard used in wholesale energy trading. CpML is an XML-based business mark-up language used for interoperable representation of energy trades for the purpose of post-deal-execution processes like deal confirmation and regulatory reporting.

The CpML standard defines the vocabulary for exchanging standardized messages for commodity trading and reporting processes and is growing according to increased coverage of post-trade services like eCM (electronic Confirmations Matching) and eRR (electronic Regulatory Reporting) and eSM (electronic Settlement Matching).

CpML was reported to increase interconnectivity and operational efficiencies, raise the quality of firm's data, allow to perform better analytics, and to reduce costs.

== History ==
CpML was first part of EFET's eCM and eXRP standards.

It was spun off into its own standard in 2012 (released as version 4.0) in the dawn of new regulatory reporting regimes for energy derivatives - such as Dodd-Frank, EMIR, and REMIT - when market participants asserted a wide variation in deal representations both within and between energy trading companies which caused a challenge to consolidate and report trade data. Regulatory reporting - especially REMIT as it was energy-specific - was perceived as an opportunity to standardise deal representations and achieve benefits in terms of analytics, risk management, and system integration, and to raise industry-wide standardisation of OTC commodity derivatives to a level similar to that of other asset classes.

The prevalence of more complex and tailored deals in energy portfolios made standardisation difficult: "many energy derivatives contracts contain a level of optionality around physical assets, such as gas storage, transport and transmission, with bespoke elements dictated by the region and by physical constraints." Modelling of such deals differs between companies and depends on the systems used.

Until 2014, estimated benefits from regulatory reporting being a catalyst for improved data and analytic capabilities had not materialised. Ambiguous and changing regulatory rules made market participants and software vendors hold off with major changes to their tightly integrated systems until regulator's wishes be clearer and it become apparent what they are really interested in. CpML was expected to help standardise the electronic representation of trades and other related information. To drive this forward, the CpML Foundation was founded as an independent entity overseen by the European Energy Trading CIO Forum.

CpML was continuously evolved according to regulatory needs. It was extended to include document structures to exchange and validate invoices and netting statements in the energy sector (electronic Settlement Matching) by the EFET in 2019.

== Governance ==
CpML is governed by the CpML Foundation, a foundation under Dutch law created in 2014.

The Governance Board of the CpML Foundation consisted initially of representatives of EDF Trading, Freepoint Commodities Europe, Gazprom Marketing & Trading, RWE Supply & Trading, BP and EFET.

== See also ==
- FpML
