= ENTSO =

ENTSO may refer to:

- European Network of Transmission System Operators for Electricity (ENTSO-E)
- European Network of Transmission System Operators for Gas (ENTSO-G)
