= EFET =

EFET may refer to:

- Enontekiö Airport's ICAO code
- European Federation of Energy Traders, a European industry association of wholesale energy traders
