= Nasdaq Commodities =

European Market

NASDAQ OMX Commodities Europe
- Type: Financial commodity exchange
- Location: Oslo, Norway
- Founded: 1996
- Owner: NASDAQ OMX
- Currency: EUR
- Commodities: Power and gas derivatives, emission allowances and emission credits
- Website: www.nasdaqomxcommodities.com

NASDAQ OMX Commodities Europe is a trade name of NASDAQ OMX Oslo ASA, the single financial energy market for Norway, Denmark, Sweden and Finland. Before 1 November 2010, it was known by the name Nord Pool (not to be confused with the physical energy exchange Nord Pool AS, former Nord Pool Spot). As of 2008, Nord Pool was the largest power derivatives exchange and the second largest exchange in European Union emission allowances (EUAs) and global certified emission reductions (CERs) trading.

== History ==
In 1991 the Parliament of Norway decided to deregulate the market for power trading. In 1993 Statnett Marked AS was established as an independent company. Nord Pool market was created in 1996 as a result of the establishment of common electricity market of Norway and Sweden. The name was changed to Nord Pool ASA. It was owned by the two national grid companies, Statnett in Norway (50%) and Svenska Kraftnät in Sweden (50%). Finland joined Nord Pool market area in 1998, Western Denmark in 1999 and Eastern Denmark in 2000.

In 2000, Nord Pool participated in establishing the Leipzig Power Exchange (now part of the European Energy Exchange). Nord Pool also supplied its technology to France's Powernext exchange. In 2002, spot market activities were transferred into a newly established company, Nord Pool Spot AS. In 2005, Nord Pool started trading and clearing of EU emission allowances, becoming the first exchange to expand its activities into this area.

On 21 December 2007, Nord Pool agreed to sell its two subsidiaries—Nord Pool Clearing, which deals with clearing transactions, and Nord Pool Consulting—to the global exchange operator NASDAQ OMX. On 17 March 2010, NASDAQ OMX announced it will acquire all shares of Nord Pool ASA. The deal does not include Nord Pool Spot AS, which will continue physical electricity market trading operations independently. The deal was approved by market regulators on 31 May 2010. On 1 November 2010, Nord Pool ASA changed its name to NASDAQ OMX Oslo ASA and introduced a trade name NASDAQ OMX Commodities Europe.

== Organization ==
NASDAQ OMX Commodities Europe provides a marketplace for financial trading in electrical power, and emission allowances and emission credits. It has its main office in Oslo with offices in Stockholm and Helsinki.

== Members ==
The NASDAQ OMX Commodities Europe market membership includes energy producers, energy intensive industries, large consumers, distributors, funds, investment companies, banks, brokers, utility companies and financial institutions. It has more than 420 members in total, including exchange members, clearing clients, members and representatives in 20 countries. The customer base for NASDAQ OMX Commodities Europe includes 400 members.

== Services ==
NASDAQ OMX Commodities Europe provides a market place for the trade on derivative contracts in the financial market. Financial electricity contracts are used to guarantee prices and manage risk when trading power. NASDAQ OMX Commodities offers contracts of up to ten years' duration, with contracts for days, weeks, months, quarters and years. NASDAQ OMX Commodities Europe also trades EUAs.

== See also ==
- Energy in Denmark
- Energy in Finland
- Energy in Norway
- Energy in Sweden
