= EEX =

EEX can refer to

- EEX Convention, see Brussels Regime
- European Energy Exchange, the energy exchange in Germany
- EEx equipment class
- EEX (calculator key) (enter exponent), to enter numbers in scientific or engineering notation
