= FpML =

XML-based markup language

FpML (Financial products Markup Language) is a business information exchange standard based on Extensible Markup Language (XML) that enables business-to-business over-the-counter (OTC) financial derivative transactions online by following W3C standards.

The standard is managed by the International Swaps and Derivatives Association (ISDA) on behalf of a community of investment banks that make up the OTC derivatives industry. All categories of privately negotiated derivatives will eventually be included within the standard.

FpML is distinct from similar financial standards such as SWIFT and FIX because it does not specify a network or transport mechanism.

== History ==
The FpML standard was first published by JPMorgan and PricewaterhouseCoopers on 9 June 1999 in a paper titled "Introducing FpML: A New Standard for E-commerce". As a result, the FpML standards committee was founded.

The core scope includes the products of Foreign Exchange (FX) Swaps and Options, Interest Rate Swaps, Inflation Swaps, Asset Swaps, Swaptions, Credit Default Swaps, Credit Default Swap Indices and Baskets, Equity Derivatives, Equity Swaps, Total Return Swaps, and many others.

The core processes include trading, valuation, confirmation, novation, increase, amendment, termination, allocation, position reporting, cash flow matching, formal definition of party roles, as well as trade notification between asset managers and custodians.

As of December 2021, FpML 5.12 is the latest recommended version.

== Major participants ==
- Bank of America
- Barclays Capital
- Barclays Global Investors
- Bloomberg
- BNP Paribas
- Citibank
- Credit Suisse
- Creditex
- Deutsche Bank
- DTCC
- HSBC Bank USA
- FIS
- Global Electronic Markets
- Goldman Sachs
- IBM
- ING
- IONA Technologies
- JPMorgan Chase
- Morgan Stanley
- Nomura Securities
- Royal Bank of Scotland
- Markit Group (since acquisition of SwapsWire)
- Rabobank
- Standard Bank
- Systemwire
- TradeHeader
- TZero
- UBS
- University College London
- Wall Street Systems

== See also ==
- Financial Information eXchange (FIX)
- MDDL, a competing Market Data Definition Language
- CpML (Commodity product Markup Language)
