= European Network of Transmission System Operators =

European Network of Transmission System Operators may refer to:

- European Network of Transmission System Operators for Electricity
- European Network of Transmission System Operators for Gas
