= CPML =

CPML may refer to:

== Science & Technology ==
- Commodity product Markup Language (CpML), an industry standard used in wholesale energy trading
- Convolutional Perfectly Matched Layer, a grid truncation technique in the finite-difference time-domain method as a part of numerical mathematics
- Cyto-Plasmic Promyelocytic Leukaemia (cPML), a form of the promyelocytic leukemia protein

== Business ==
- Central Pennsylvania Multiple Listing, a MLS-based system for real estate agents in Pennsylvania, US

== Other ==
- Communist Party (Marxist–Leninist) (United States)
