= Code of Conduct for Clearing and Settlement =

The European Code of Conduct for Clearing and Settlement (Code of Conduct) was an initiative of European securities exchanges, clearing houses and central securities depositories to set uniform rules for trading, clearing, settlement and custody services for stocks. The Code of Conduct contains rules which aimed to enhance transparency for customers and improve services for cross-border transactions as well as harmonise the European capital market and revitalise the international securities traffic. It would lead on to the European Market Infrastructure Regulation and other central counterparty clearing harmonization as part of the European Union.

== History ==
The Code of Conduct was agreed on 31 October 2006 by all members of the Federation of European Securities Exchanges (FESE), the European Association of Central Counterparty Clearing Houses (EACH) and the European Central Securities Depositories Association (ECSDA).

The Code of Conduct was not only meant to guarantee an increased transparency of prices and services in the cross-border securities business, but was also supposed to stimulate the international securities traffic. Due to technical interfaces built to ensure the interoperability of diverse platforms, segregated accounting as well as newly structured services the market participants will be enabled to order Clearing, Settlement and Safekeeping at different institutions.

The Code contained rules, which should lead to the improvement of price transparency, to facilitate and open access to cross-border services (trade, clearing and settlement) and finally to separate services relating to trade, clearing settlement, and custody services and to enable the separate billing of these services.
