= IP Systems =

Company

IP Systems Ltd.
- Type: Limited company
- Industry: Energy industry, Software industry
- Founded: 2008
- Headquarters: Budapest, Hungary
- Key people: Ákos Füzi, CEO
- Products: See complete products listing.
- Number of employees: above 50
- Website: www.ipsystems.hu

IP Systems Ltd. is a consultancy and IT company specialized for the liberalized European energy market. Its applications support the whole energy trading process, including forecasting, nomination, allocation and accounting.

== History ==
IP Systems were set up in 2008. In 2011, the company started its international growth.

== International participation ==
- Gas Balancing-IP was introduced in 2012 on the 4th Energy Trading Week was recommended for the use on regional level, furthermore in a unique way besides FGSZ Natural Gas Transmission Closed Company Limited, IP Systems were also invited by ENTSOG to the working group to help developing the European natural gas balancing model.

== Awards and appreciations ==
- Gas Balancing-IP won the ’ICT project of the year’ award of the IVSZ ICT Association of Hungary and National Innovation Office in 2012.
