= Regulatory Authority for Energy =

The Regulatory Authority for Energy (RAE or ΡΑΕ from Ρυθμιστική Αρχή Ενέργειας in Greek) is an independent administrative authority, which was established in order to implement the provisions of Directive 96/92/EC for the liberalization of the electricity market in Greece.

RAE is a member of the Council of European Energy Regulators.

== See also ==
- Energy in Greece
