= Jolanta Róża Kozłowska =

Polish politician

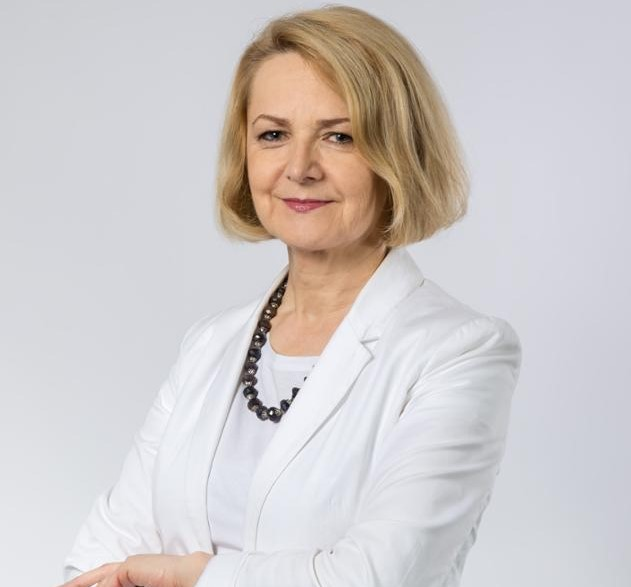

Poland Ambassador to Austria
- In office 2017 – 30 September 2022
- Preceded by: Artur Lorkowski
- Succeeded by: Zenon Kosiniak-Kamysz

Personal details
- Born: 21 April 1957 (age 69) Zawichost, Poland
- Parent(s): Jan Kozłowski, Genowefa Kozłowska
- Education: Maria Curie-Skłodowska University; University of Freiburg
- Profession: Diplomat

Jolanta Róża Kozłowska (born 21 April 1957 in Zawichost) is a Polish diplomat. Ambassador to Austria (2017–2022), Consul-General in Munich (1998–2002) and Cologne (2009–2013).

== Life ==
Kozłowska started her studies at the Kielce Pedagogical Academy. She was an active member of the dissident movement, distributing samizdat. Because of that, in 1978 she was expelled from the academy with no right to study anywhere else. In 1980, she was twice detained. That year, she was allowed to take up her studies again. In 1983, she graduated from music studies at the Maria Curie-Skłodowska University, Lublin (UMCS). She was an activist of the UMCS Independent Students’ Association. In 1984, Kozłowska moved to Germany. She received her master's degree in German history from the University of Freiburg. She has been engaged in Polish-German dialogue and GFPS e.V., organization, financially supporting Polish students. She took an English language course at the University of California, Berkeley.

In 1992, Kozłowska returned to Poland, working for a year at the Ministry of Culture and Art where she was in charge of cooperation with ethnic minorities in Poland. In 1994 she joined the diplomatic service. Her first diplomatic post was the reopened Consulate General in Munich, where she was responsible for cultural relations. Between 1998 and 2002 she was consul-general. From 2003 to 2009, she was director of the Ludwig van Beethoven Easter Festival bureau in Warsaw and Kraków, closely cooperating with the Adam Mickiewicz Institute at that time. In 2009, she was Consul-General again, this time in Cologne. Next year, she was chosen dean of the consular corps in North Rhine-Westphalia and Düsseldorf. In 2013, she returned to Poland, becoming advisor on foreign affairs of the Podkarpackie Voivodeship marshal. In August 2017, Kozłowska was appointed ambassador to Austria. She presented her letter of credence to the president Alexander van der Bellen on 5 December 2017. She ended her term on 30 September 2022.

Kozłowska is active in several non-governmental organizations, e.g. Ludwik van Beethoven Association in Warsaw, Ignacy Paderewski Christian-Democratic Institute in Warsaw, Hieronim Dekutowski-Zapora Foundation in Tarnobrzeg.

Kozłowska’s father was Jan Kozłowski, member of the Senate of Poland (1989–1991). Besides Polish, she speaks German, English, and Russian.

== Honours ==
- Decoration of Honour for Services to the Republic of Austria, Grand Decoration of Honour in Gold with Sash (2022)
