= Unique Transaction Identifier =

Globally unique identifier for individual transactions in financial markets

A Unique Transaction Identifier (UTI), alternatively called Unique Swap Identifier (Acronym: USI) is a globally unique identifier for individual transactions in financial markets. USIs were introduced in late 2012 in the U.S. in the context of Dodd–Frank regulation, where reporting of transactions to Trade Repositories first became mandatory. European financial market regulations followed suit, with reporting to Trade Repositories under EMIR requiring UTIs from February 2014 on. The use of the UTI is also mandatory for regulatory reporting under REMIT. Strictly speaking, the term USI is specific to the U.S. regulation, while UTI is specific to EU regulations. In practice, both terms are used interchangeable, in particular within large trading firms reporting under both regimes.

The UTI/USI is governed by the ISO 23897 standard.

== Structure ==
A UTI/USI is an alphanumeric code of fixed length, with the maximum length defined as either 42 (U.S.) or 52 (EU) characters. The UTI typically consists of a prefix followed by the concatenated code value. Taken together, prefix and value form the UTI, and should be globally unique.

The prefix portion of the UTI code should be a unique code for the code issuing authority. Ideally, the prefix would have reused the Legal Entity Identifier (LEI) of the entity issuing the UTI. LEI codes are used across the financial reporting regimes in the U.S. (Dodd-Frank) and Europe (EMIR / MiFID). However, the LEI code length of 20 characters represented a problem for many systems, which in practice limited the usable prefix length to 10 characters. In June 2013, ISDA working groups suggested that the characters 7 through 16 of the 20 character global LEI number should be used as the UTI prefix. This would have led to clashes between UTIs generated for different organisations having the same characters 7 through 16 in their LEIs. The current recommendation by the BIS, based on the CPMI/IOSCO Harmonization Group consultations regarding the prefix (the mint component of the UTI), is: "With regard to what code should constitute the mint component, the CPMI and IOSCO have applied the preference for using existing international standards and have selected the LEI code".

The second component of the UTI is the code value, sometimes called the Transaction Identifier part. The CFTC defines the transaction identifier part as an alphanumeric code of variable length, up to a maximum of 32 characters. In addition to alphanumeric characters, certain special characters are permissible as internal delimiters: colon, hyphen, period, and underscore. These special characters may not start or end the code, nor may they be used consecutively.

The ESMA recommend that the Trade ID should be formed by the concatenation (without separators) of the three elements; the characters 'E02', the LEI of the generating entity and a unique Trade ID generated by the generating entity. The prefixes 'E00' through 'E99' are reserved by the ESMA.

Check digits are not a prescribed part of the UTI, but some issuing systems have them as part of the code value.

== Sources ==
- BIS(editors): "Committee on Payments and Market Infrastructures Board of the International Organization of Securities Commissions Technical Guidance Harmonisation of the Unique Transaction Identifier". February, 2017.
- ESMA(editors): "Questions and Answers Implementation of the Regulation (EU) No 648/2012 on OTC derivatives, central counterparties and trade repositories (EMIR". February 16, 2016.
- CFTC (editors): Unique Swap Identifier (USI) - Data Standard. October 1, 2012.
- ISDA (editors): Unique Swap Identifier (USI) : An Overview Document. June 7, 2012.
- ISDA (editors): Unique Trade Identifier (UTI): Generation, Communication and Matching. March 20, 2015.
- ACER (editors): Trade Reporting User Manual (TRUM), Annex IV - Guidance on UTI v1.0, March 8, 2016.
