= Artur Lorkowski =

Polish diplomat

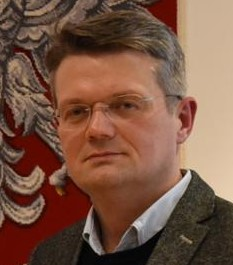
- Artur Lorkowski (2020)

Poland Ambassador to Austria
- In office 18 June 2013 – 30 June 2017
- Preceded by: Jerzy Margański
- Succeeded by: Jolanta Róża Kozłowska

Personal details
- Born: 1974 (age 51–52) Sierpc, Poland
- Spouse: Monika Janusz-Lorkowska
- Children: 1
- Education: SGH Warsaw School of Economics; National School of Public Administration
- Profession: Diplomat

Artur Lorkowski (born 1974 in Sierpc) is a Polish diplomat. Ambassador to Austria (2013–2017), Director of Secretariat of the Energy Community (since 2021).

== Life ==
Lorkowski graduated from international economic relations at the SGH Warsaw School of Economics (1999) and from the National School of Public Administration (2001). He was studying also at the University of Göttingen (1997–1998). He took part in the US Department of State International Visitor Leadership Programme (2012). In 2013, he was Associate Member at the St. Antony's College, University of Oxford.

In 2001, he began his professional career at the Office of the Committee for European Integration. In 2003, he became deputy director responsible for sectoral policies. Since 2006, has been involved in climate change issues. In 2010, he joined the Ministry of Foreign Affairs. Until 2013, he was deputy director of the MFA Economic Policy Department, being in charge of energy security and climate change. From 18 June 2013 to 30 June 2017 he was representing Poland as an Ambassador to Austria. Following his service in Vienna, he was Minister's special envoy for organizing COP 2018 Conference in Katowice, Poland. In 2019, he worked for the UN Secretary General's Climate Summit. In March 2020, he was nominated vice-president of the management board of the National Fund for Environmental Protection and Water Management. Since 1 December 2021 Lorkowski holds the post of the Director of Secretariat of the Energy Community in Vienna. He replaced Janez Kopač.

Besides Polish, he speaks German, English, Russian, and French. He is married to Monika Janusz-Lorkowska, University of Warsaw academic, with a son.

== Honours ==
- Silver Cross of Merit, Poland, 2005
- Gold Cross of Merit, Poland, 2011
