= Electronic invoicing =

Form of electronic billing

UML class diagram depicting a invoice

Electronic invoicing (also called e-invoicing or einvoicing) is a form of electronic billing. E-invoicing includes a number of different technologies and entry options and is usually used as an umbrella term to describe any method by which a document is electronically presented from one party to another, either for payment or to present and monitor transactional documents between trade partners to ensure the terms of their trading agreements are being met. These documents can include invoices, purchase orders, debit notes, credit notes, payment terms, payment instructions, and remittance slips.

== Purpose ==
A business's accounts payable department ensures that all invoices from its suppliers are approved, processed, and paid. The main responsibility of the accounts receivable department is to ensure all invoices are created, delivered and subsequently paid by their customers. Processing an invoice includes recording relevant data from the invoice and feeding it into the company's financial or bookkeeping systems. After the feed is accomplished, the invoices go through the company's business process to be paid.

An e-invoice can be defined as structured invoice data issued in electronic data interchange (EDI) or XML formats, possibly using Internet-based web forms. These documents can be exchanged in a number of ways, including as EDI, XML, or CSV files. The company may use imaging software to capture data from PDF or paper invoices and input it into their invoicing system. Many companies hire a third-party company to implement and support e-invoicing processes and to archive the data on their own servers.

The file extension .INV could be used. The .INV file can be in standards-compliant XML format.

== History ==
Since the mid-1960s, companies have begun establishing data links with trading partners to transfer documents such as invoices and purchase orders. Inspired by paperless office, they developed the first EDI systems. At the time, there was no standard for electronic data interchange.

The Accredited Standards Committee X12, a standards institution under the umbrella of ANSI, moved to standardize EDI processes. The result is known today as the ANSI X12 EDI standard. This remained the main way to exchange transactional data between trading partners until the 1990s, when companies began competing. New web-based applications allow for online submission of individual invoices as well as EDI file uploads, including in CSV, PDF, and XML formats. Suppliers could also see a history of all the invoices they submitted to their customers without having direct access to the customers' systems. This is because all the transactional information is stored in the data centers of the third-party company that provides the invoicing web app.

According to a 2012 Global E-Invoicing Study, 73% of respondents used electronic invoicing to some degree in 2012, a 14% increase from 2011. Supplier resistance to e-invoicing has decreased from 46% in 2011 to 26% in 2012. By 2022, a leading provider reported a 78% increase in the number of invoices processed through its platform over a two-year period. According to a report done by the GXS in 2013, Europe is adopting government legislation encouraging businesses to adopt electronic invoicing practices. The United States Treasury estimated that implementing e-invoicing across the entire federal government would reduce costs by 50% and save $450 million annually.

== Standards ==
Various standards exist: the EU's Directive 2014/55/EU on electronic invoicing in public procurement noted that "several global, national, regional and proprietary standards exist; ... none of them prevail and most of them are not interoperable with one another. The number of different standards coexisting across Member States is increasing and is likely to continue increasing in the future". The Directive also noted that

Interoperability cannot be sufficiently achieved by the Member States but can therefore be better achieved at Union level, [therefore] the Union may adopt measures, in accordance with the principle of subsidiarity as set out in Article 5 of the Treaty on European Union.

=== Generic ===
- EDIFACT
- UBL (Universal Business Language)

=== National and sector-specific ===
- CFDI (Mexico)
- E-faktura (Poland)
- E-Invoice (Estonia)
- EHF (Elektronisk Handelsformat) (Norway)
- eSM (wholesale energy trading)
- FacturaE (Spain)
- Factur-X (France)
- Facturación Electrônica (Ecuador)
- FatturaPA (Italy)
- Finvoice (Finland)
- ISDOC (Czechia)
- LibreDTE (Chile)
- Nota Fiscal Eletrônica (Brazil)
- OIOUBL (Denmark)
- PEPPOL BIS (various countries)
- Svefaktura (Sweden)
- UBL-OHNL (Netherlands)
- ZUGFeRD, XRechnung (Germany)

Under the EU Directive on electronic invoicing in public procurement, the EU commissioned the development of a technologically neutral "European standard on electronic invoicing".

== Usage ==
To enable e-invoicing, there must be an existing method of viewing the transactions, typically an ERP (enterprise resource planning) or accounting system. Once routing is established in the system, validation rules can be set up to reduce the number of invoice exceptions. Once the e-invoicing specification testing is complete, the business's suppliers will be connected electronically.

== Government mandates ==
Several governments and tax administrations imposed e-invoicing formats in their respective jurisdictions for business-to-business (B2B) transactions, and required that the emitted documents be stored in centralized repositories, often controlled by the tax administration. Mexico, for example, introduced the CFDI format in 2004 in Appendix 20 of its Tax Code, requiring that all invoices be stored with the Mexican Tax Administration. Non-standard invoices have been banned by law since 2012. Chile implemented a similar system in 2003, and Colombia in 2020. According to a research paper published by the Harvard Kennedy School of Government, Mexico's tax-to-GDP ratio rose from 12.6% to 16.2% between 2012 and 2017, driven largely by a 48% increase in revenue from tax on goods and services after e-invoicing was made mandatory.

The European Commission put forward an initial proposal for the use of electronic invoicing in public sector purchasing in 2013, noting that Denmark, Austria, Sweden and Finland had already seen benefits through mandating suppliers to submitted some public sector invoices electronically. Directive 2014/55/EU was adopted the following year. The goal of the directive is to develop a single European standard for exchange of electronic invoices, making EU-wide invoicing simpler. Aside from aiming at harmonising invoicing, the directive sets specific requirements meant to protect citizens' rights.

The United Kingdom government implemented the EU Directive through the Public Procurement (Electronic Invoices etc.) Regulations 2019. The UK was still a member of the European Union at this time. The Procurement Act 2023, enacted after Brexit, follows the same principles. The regulation applies only to undisputed invoices in government procurement and only above certain thresholds depending on a contract type (in the range spanning 100 thousand to 5 million GBP). Contract parties are free to choose any exchange method, as long as it remains free of charge and ensures general availability, interoperability, and accessibility for disabled people. Per section 115, Scotland remains covered by the Scottish Procurement Reform Act 2014, which contains no provisions for electronic invoicing.

A similar obligation has existed in Italy since 2019.

France introduced mandatory government-controlled B2B e-invoicing starting in July 2024.

Poland began its e‑invoicing journey by mandating structured electronic invoices (e‑Invoices) for public procurement (B2G) on September 11, 2019, in line with EU Directive 2014/55/EU. From January 1, 2022, e‑invoicing via the country's National System of e‑Invoices (KSeF) became optional for B2B. On March 30, 2022, the European Commission granted Poland derogation under the VAT Directive to require mandatory B2B e‑invoicing through KSeF. The EU Council confirmed the mandate would begin January 1, 2024, while Poland’s Ministry of Finance initiated public consultation in December 2022 and subsequently postponed implementation to July 1, 2024. Businesses must now integrate their accounting systems with KSeF or use the official API or portal.

The Malaysian Government declared in the 2023 Tax Budget that mandatory e-invoicing would be introduced for businesses with an annual turnover exceeding RM100 million starting in June 2024. By 2027, all businesses will be required to adopt this electronic invoicing method.

The United Arab Emirates announced its e-invoicing initiative in July 2023. The Ministry of Finance plans to roll out mandatory e-invoicing for B2B and B2G transactions by July 2026. This system will follow a decentralized model, initially covering domestic transactions with potential future inclusion of B2C transactions. The initiative aims to enhance tax compliance and reduce administrative costs.

== See also ==
- Electronic receipt
