= Energy Identification Code =

The Energy Identification Code (EIC) is a 16-character identifier (code) used in Europe to uniquely identify market participants and energy resources (entities and objects) related to the electricity and gas sector.

EIC codes are used for:

- Transmission System Operators, Market Participants such as traders, producers, consumers, power exchanges, grid operators, suppliers, agents, service providers, etc.
- Local grids where metering points are situated, Market Balance Areas consisting of several local grids, Control Areas, Bidding Zones, etc.
- The physical lines that connect adjacent market (balance) areas or internal lines within an area, including Transmission lines.
- Metering points
- Physical or logical places where an identified object or the IT system of an identified object is or could be located.
- Any object that generates or consumes energy, including Substations, Generation units and Power plants.

The EIC codes are used — among others — in platforms that support EU regulations on transparency and integrity:

- ENTSO-E Transparency Platform for electricity
- ENTSO-G Transparency Platform for gas
- ARIS platform

== Actors involved in the EIC coding scheme ==
The scheme is supported by a central issuing office (CIO), which function is exercised by the ENTSO-E Secretariat for both the electricity and gas sectors, and ENTSO-E-authorised Local Issuing Offices (LIOs) in Europe. As of 2024-12-17, there are 62 LIOs

EIC consists of 16 characters structured as follows:

- 2 digits: LIO id
- 1 letter: resource type as per the table below.
- 12 chars: LIO-specific identifier, padded on the right with dashes
- 1 char: checksum

EIC types (see EIC Definitions for more details):

type	name
A	Substation
T	Tieline
V	Location
W	Resource Object
X	Party
Y	Area or Domain
Z	Measurement point

On 2021-12-16, IANA registered the urn:eic URN namespace, so now EIC can be used in making semantic triples of Common Information Model (electricity) data or other energy Linked Open Data.
