= Ownership unbundling =

Ownership unbundling is the process by which a company is divested of some of its downstream or upstream assets via legislation. This is often done to break up monopolies. Vertically integrated businesses are often ownership unbundled to achieve more competitive markets. The First Railway Directive and Third Energy Package in the EU both have this as their aims.

Ownership unbundling aims to separate the economic interests of upstream, midstream, and downstream entities within a business area to increase competition.

In the context of energy, ownership unbundling requires that an individual or company may own a supplier of energy or a transmission network for that energy, but not both at once. Similarly, in the context of transport, ownership unbundling produces a clear separation between the entity maintaining the transport infrastructure and the entity running transport services on that infrastructure.
