= EurObserv'ER =

- EurObserv'ER logo
- Founded: 1999
- Type: Consortium's project
- Purpose: Renewable energy
- Location: Paris
- Region served: European Union
- Services: Indicators and trends
- Method: Monitoring of RES development in the EU
- Website: www.eurobserv-er.org

EurObserv'ER is a consortium dedicated to the monitoring of the development of the various sectors of renewable energies in the European Union.

Created in 1999 by Observ'ER, the Observatory of renewable energies in France, it is composed of five other partners: ECN (The Energy research Centre of the Netherlands), IEO (EC BREC Institute of Renewable Energetic Ltd), RENAC (Renewables Academy AG), FS (Frankfurt School of finance and management) and IJS (Institut Jozef Stefan).

Each year it publishes a number of reports, one for each sector: photovoltaic, wind energy, solid biomass, hydro, solar thermal, concentrated solar power, ocean energies, geothermal energy, biofuels, biogas and solid waste. These reports are called "Barometers", e.g. "Biofuels barometer 2013". These barometers summarises the state for each of the EU member states for the particular energy sector using both technical and socioeconomic indicators. It also publishes an annual report on the state of renewable energies in Europe.

EurObserv'ER provides free information to a large public and many other actors as the policy makers, industry players and journalists. It is supported by the Intelligent Energy- Europe Programme, Ademe and Caisse des Dépôts.

== Objectives ==
EurObserv'ER's objective is to provide a synthetic and a very reactive picture of the energy, industry and policy trends observed in the EU 28 Member States for each RES sector. Thus, it gives a reactive measurement tool that makes up for the gap between the end of the year and the time when official statistics are released.

By monitoring the EU Member States progression towards the 2020 RES directive targets, EurObserv'ER works as a support to the fulfilment of the EU policy to develop the RES share of gross final energy consumption The current project will extend the scope of indicators and analysis to the integration of Croatia and the provision of a complete set of investment indicators. In fact, because of the economic crisis, public spending on RES development are being decreased in many Member States, so the EurObserv'ER team wants to help attracting private investments in the RES sectors.

== Publications ==
Since 1999, the EurObserv'ER barometer project has been an independent tool, which provides relevant, synthetic and reliable indicators on the level of development of renewable energy sectors within countries of the European Union in support of the European legislation dedicated to the development of renewable energy production. The fields covered by EurObserv’ER are related to energy, industry, socioeconomic dimensions and, with this new phase of work, investment indicators. The barometers do not only provide reliable figures on the markets but also analysis and description of the facts and trends in each RES sector. They publish comparable data by using collection and calculation methodologies that are the same for all the countries of EU.

They illustrate the contribution of RES development to European economy, activities and employment. The socio-economic indicators that are constructed on a European and national level help evidence that RES sectors have a lot of assets to help the transition to a competitive, dynamic and knowledge based economy.

« The State of Renewable Energy in Europe » provides clear landmarks of where the Member States stand as a whole about the RES share of gross final energy consumption. All barometers will be available in up to five languages soon: English, French, German, Polish, and Romanian. Some of them will also be available in Italian and Spanish.

== Members of the consortium ==
=== Coordinator ===
==== Observ’ER ====
Set up in 1980, Observ'ER, composed of economists and policy experts, produces studies that are recognised on the national and European levels.

Observ'ER publishes Systèmes Solaires, Le Journal des energies renouvelables, a bi-monthly magazine about renewable energy and two special editions about the photovoltaic and wind power sectors. In this way it plays an advisory role for public authorities and decision-makers, and takes an active part in major contemporary energy debates. Its other mission is to quantify and qualify the progress made by renewable energies. Observ'ER has been successfully leading the consortium since the creation of the EurObserv’ER project.

=== Partners ===
==== ECN ====
The Energy research Centre of the Netherlands (ECN) is active within the transition area between fundamental research carried out by universities and the application of knowledge within the market. It is the largest research center in the Netherlands in the field of energy (600 people employed by the end of 2006).

ECN focuses on the knowledge and information required by the government to develop and evaluate policies and to achieve policy objectives in the field of energy, the environment and technological innovation. ECN works together with national and international industry in the development and implementation of products, processes and technologies important for the transition to a sustainable energy system. The multidisciplinary project teams provide consultancy services at the national, European and global level.

==== IEO ====
EC BREC Institute of Renewable Energetic Ltd is an independent consultancy company, established in 2001. In EC BREC Ltd, the personal knowledge and experience of experts is used to develop projects connected with renewable energy promotion and implementation in Poland.

EC BREC Ltd provides 22 highly qualified specialists, with sound expert background in renewable energy and sustainable energy problems. Depending on the requirements, the projects are supported by experts working in various fields of utilisation of renewables. For instance, they bring support to the national government in preparation of legal regulations, policies and strategies or promotion of mechanisms and instruments supporting development of RES in the European Union.

==== RENAC ====
Since June 2010, RENAC is partner of the EurObserv’ER consortium. The Renewables Academy AG (RENAC), based in Berlin, is one of the leading international providers of education and training in the fields of renewable energy and energy efficiency. Since the founding of RENAC in January 2008, over two thousand participants from more than 100 countries worldwide have benefited from their expertise in the technology, financing, management and market development of renewable energy and energy efficiency.

The rapid growth of the renewable energy and energy efficiency markets has led to increased demand for expertise and qualifications throughout the industry, financial institutions and policy-setting bodies. Through training and professional services, RENAC aims to propagate the necessary know-how for the growth of renewable energy and energy efficiency markets.

==== IJS ====
The Jožef Stefan Institute is the leading Slovenian research organisation. It is responsible for a broad spectrum of basic and applied research in the fields of natural sciences and technology. The staff of around 850 specialise in research in physics, chemistry and biochemistry, electronics and information science, nuclear technology, energy utilisation and environmental science.

The Jožef Stefan Institute – Energy Efficiency Centre (JSI/EEC) basic activities are related to efficient energy use, long-term energy planning and the reduction of greenhouse-gas emissions. The Centre is a focal point for the collection and transfer of energy-efficiency technologies to the energy users, the state, the energy-service and equipment providers, and other interested parties. The most significant part of the EEC’s activities is thus the co-operation with state institutions in the preparation of strategic documents and legislation relating to the efficient energy use, energy planning, distributed electricity production and emission trading. But it also continues to be strongly connected, through its consulting and training activities, with industrial companies and other institutions. Its network of contacts extends to the Czech Republic and Croatia.

==== FS ====
Frankfurt School of Finance & Management is a leading private Business School and advisory institute in Germany with more than 50 years experience in consulting, qualification, project implementation, and training services. Frankfurt School's mission is to advance national and international business practices through academic research, executive education, and advisory activities. Frankfurt School is a non-profit, limited liability company with almost 400 employees. The International Advisory Services (IAS) department is committed to improve financial markets and to increase access to finance for small enterprises and low-income populations. IAS is structured in seven core competence centres, whereas one is exclusively dedicated to Sustainable Energy Finance. Accordingly, IAS assists financial institutions in developing a business segment for financing of energy efficiency measures and renewable energy investments. Besides strategy and product development, marketing, and adaptation of procedures and reporting, it puts a special focus on capacity building through classroom and on-the-job trainings. Furthermore, Frankfurt School is active in networking for international best practice exchange as well as applied research with regards to financing aspects of climate change mitigation, adaptation, and financial sector involvement.

== Users ==
Over time, the EurObserv'ER barometer has become a reference in Europe (in 2012, more than 92 000 downloads were counted). Numerous actors use its indicators:

- National policy makers who, in this way, have immediate arguments, backed up by figures on the impact of their policies
- DG ENER civil servants who need these figures to monitor, as closely as possible, the efforts made by each Member State without waiting for official statistic figures to be released.
- Industry players who, in this way, can have reliable indicators and policy indications for the renewable sectors and thus, a kind of « compass » helping them to better grasp their growth potential and investment opportunities
- Financers and developers who will find relevant information on policy support measures and on the industry context
- Journalists, who write more and more articles on climate change and renewable energies and need to find basic up to date information
- Research consultancies in charge of energy modelling, which use the barometer's figures as an input in their economic analyses
- Chambers of commerce who have to inform their clients on the situation of RES in the different EU countries
- RES associations for the promotion of renewable energies that use barometer data in their communications or projects
- High school and university teachers' trainings, which can supplement their courses with latest trends in the RES sectors

== See also ==
- Energy law
- European Federation of Energy Traders
- Lists about renewable energy
- List of renewable energy organizations
- Renewable energy in the European Union

== Publications ==
- All barometers
- 12th annual overview barometer 2012
- Interactive EurObserv’ER Database
- EurObserv'ER policy files for all EU-27 Member States
