= E-Control =

Government regulator for electricity and natural gas markets in Austria

E-Control (ECG)

Agency overview
- Formed: March 2001
- Type: Government regulatory agency for gas and electricity
- Jurisdiction: Austria
- Headquarters: Rudolfsplatz 13a, 1010 Vienna, Austria
- Employees: 67
- Annual budget: €10 Million
- Agency executives: Walter Boltz, CEO; Walter Barfuß, Member of the board of directors; Georg Obermeier, Member of the board of directors; Johannes Mrazek, Member of the board of directors; Alfred Maier, Member of the board of directors; Gerhard Langeder, Member of the board of directors
- Parent agency: Federal Ministry of Economics and Labour
- Website: www.e-control.at

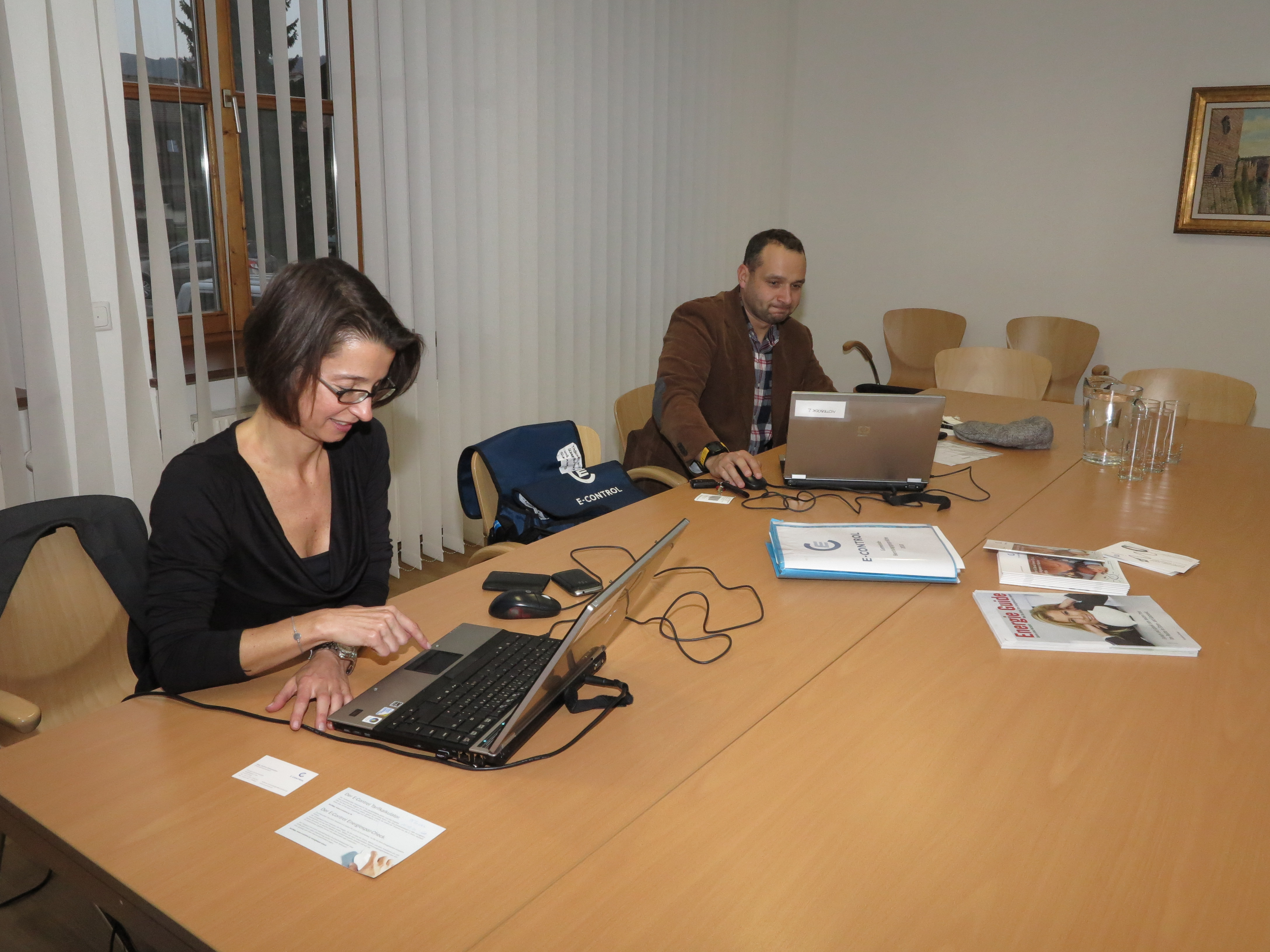
E-Control Citizens Advice in the rooms of a Tyrolean town

E-Control (ECG) is the government regulator for electricity and natural gas markets in Austria. It was founded in 2001 on the basis of the Energy Liberalisation Act. E-Control's main duty as the independent regulatory authority is to "oversee and to control the Austrian gas and electricity market in the best interest of the consumer".

== Functions ==
On their website the critical consumer can check the prices and conditions of all suppliers on the Austrian market. With more details about the energy usage of the consumer a program on the website can recommend the cheapest provider.

Furthermore, it offers a contact point for complaints and a mediation body to resolve possible conflicts with all Austrian energy providers.

== Organisational structure ==
The agency is owned to 100% by the federal state and consists of several bodies: the E-Control Commission, E-Control GmbH and the Federal Minister of Economic Affairs and Labour.

=== Federal Minister of Economic Affairs and Labour ===
The highest authority in the electricity sector, which has mainly three tasks to fulfill: the supervision of all activities of the E-Control Ltd. and the Federal Government's shareholding in E-Control. Furthermore, it has to establish E-Control's terms of reference.

=== E-Control Commission ===
The E-Control-Commission is an independent authority, which is capable of acting on its own without interferences of directors. The commission approves the general conditions for the use of transfer and distribution grids by grid operators. The commission can set tariffs, determines fixed prices and can prohibit use of conditions affecting consumers negatively. They also settle disputes between the market players and take long term measures to ensure the supply of natural gas. It also rules on certain disputes between market participants. The members of the commission are appointed for five years.

=== E-Control Ltd. ===
E-Control GmbH is the regulator of the energy system as determined by the ElWOG (Elektrizitätswirtschafts- und organisationsgesetz) and the GWG (Gaswirtschaftsgesetz). Its main task is to support the E-Control Commission in any of its tasks. Moreover, it is responsible for the publication of reports and official statements with regard to market conditions and competition. The company is a non-profit organisation fully owned by the federal government. Its chief executive officer is Walter Boltz. E-Control GmbH is the regulative authority for issues that don't fall under the mandate of the E-Control Commission.

== Liberalization ==
After the implementation of the ElWOG I in 1998 the market opened stepwise, basis for the calculation was the annual consumption of all consumers and after the introduction of the ElWOG II in 2002 the electricity market was finally fully opened to the consumers. Therefore, the consumers are capable of choosing their own provider and moreover they are able to switch between the provider respectively. The grid operation section still holds a natural monopoly, because of the high proportion of fixed costs concerning all grid operations. On the other hand, generation and distribution are fully opened for competition in the free market. There is also a new link between generation and distribution of electricity, namely the "trade section", including traders, brokers and private investors.

The reason for the need of a liberalisation was the power stations and networks were too expensive to build and it took a lot of time (decades) to amortize the investments. Due to this high risk, there were only a few private entrepreneurs, who were willingly to invest in the electricity industry. On the whole technological innovation was the fundament of the liberalization act.
