= Council of European Energy Regulators =

International organization

- Abbreviation: CEER
- Formation: 2000
- Legal status: Non-profit organization
- Purpose: Energy market regulation in Europe
- Headquarters: Brussels
- Location: Cours Saint-Michel 30a, 1040 Brussels, Belgium
- Region served: Europe
- Members: 39
- Secretary General: Māra Bērziņa
- Main organ: General Assembly and Board of Directors (President - Annegret Groebel)
- Affiliations: ACER, International Confederation of Energy Regulators
- Website: ceer.eu

The Council of European Energy Regulators (CEER) is a non-profit organization in which Europe's national energy regulators co-operate to protect consumer interests and to facilitate the creation of a single, competitive, and sustainable internal market for gas and electricity in Europe.

== Foundation and mission ==
In March 2000, ten national energy regulatory authorities voluntarily signed a memorandum of understanding for the establishment of CEER. CEER's objective is to facilitate cooperation among Europe's energy regulators in promoting a single-EU electricity and gas market. In 2003, CEER was formally established as a non-profit organization under Belgian law, with its own Brussels-based Secretariat. CEER represents 30 Members - the national energy regulators from the EU Member States, Iceland, Norway and Great Britain as CEER Members, and the regulators of Albania, Bosnia and Herzegovina, Georgia, Kosovo, Moldova, Montenegro, Republic of North Macedonia, Republic of Serbia and the Swiss Confederation as Observers. CEER works closely with the Agency for the Cooperation of Energy Regulators (ACER). ACER is a European Community body with legal personality. ACER became fully operational on 3 March 2011. ACER's seat is located in Ljubljana, Slovenia.

== Organization Objectives ==
CEER seeks to facilitate the creation of a single, competitive, efficient and sustainable market for gas and electricity in Europe.

Some other objectives:

- Facilitate consultation, coordination, and co-operation of national regulatory authorities, contributing to a consistent application of legislation in all Member states
- Set up co-operation, information exchange, and assistance amongst regulators
- Contribute to the advancement of research on regulatory issues
- Operate a training academy for energy regulators

CEER acts as a platform for cooperation, information exchange, and assistance between national energy regulators and is their interface at European level with the EU Institutions.

CEER establishes expert views for discussion with the European Commission (in particular DG Energy) and seeks to provide the necessary elements for the development of regulation in the fields of electricity and gas.

CEER also strives to share regulatory experience worldwide through its links with similar regional energy regulatory associations.

== Members ==
CEER membership is open to the national energy regulatory authorities of the European Union and the European Economic Area (EEA). The CEER now has 30 Members, including energy regulators in the 27 EU-Member States plus Iceland, Norway and Great Britain - as well as nine Observers - the energy regulators from Albania, Bosnia and Herzegovina, Georgia, Kosovo, Moldova, Montenegro, Republic of North Macedonia, Republic of Serbia and the Swiss Confederation.

Country	Authority	Short Name
Austria	Energie-Control Austria	E-Control
Belgium	Belgian Federal Commission for Electricity and Gas Regulation.	CREG
Bulgaria	State Energy & Water Regulatory Commission	SEWRC
Croatia	Croatian energy regulatory agency	HERA
Cyprus	Cyprus Energy Regulatory Authority	CERA
Czech Republic	Energy Regulatory Office	ERO
Denmark	Danish Energy Regulatory Authority	DERA
Estonia	Estonian Competition Authority - Energy Regulatory Dept	ECA
Finland	The Energy Market Authority	EV
France	Energy Regulation Commission	CRE
Germany	Federal Network Agency for Electricity, Gas, Telecommunications, Posts and Railway	BNetzA
Greece	Regulatory Authority for Energy	PAE / RAE
Hungary	Hungarian Energy and Public Utility Regulatory Authority	MEKH
Iceland	National Energy Authority	Orkustofnun
Ireland	Commission for Regulation of Utilities	CRU
Italy	Italian Regulatory Authority for Energy, Networks, and Environment	ARERA
Latvia	Public Utilities Commission	PUC
Lithuania	National Control Commission for Prices and Energy	NCC
Luxembourg	Luxembourg Institute of Regulation	ILR
Malta	Regulator for Energy and Water Services	REWS
Netherlands	Dutch Office of Energy Regulation / Authority for Consumers and Markets	ACM
Norway	Norwegian Water Resources and Energy Directorate	NVE
Poland	The Energy Regulatory Office of Poland	URE
Portugal	Energy Services Regulatory Authority	ERSE
Romania	Romanian Energy Regulatory Authority	ANRE
Slovak Republic	Regulatory Office for Network Industries	URSO/RONI
Slovenia	Energy Agency of the Republic of Slovenia	AGEN
Spain	National Commission for Markets and Competition	CNMC
Sweden	Energy Markets Inspectorate	Ei
United Kingdom	Office of Gas and Electricity Markets	Ofgem

== See also ==
- Agency for the Cooperation of Energy Regulators (ACER)
- Energy law
- Energy Regulators Regional Association (ERRA)
- European Regulators' Group for Electricity and Gas (ERGEG)
- EURELECTRIC
- Nord Pool
