= Azienda Elettrica Ticinese =

Swiss electricity wholesaler

Azienda Elettrica Ticinese (AET) is an electricity wholesaler based in Bellinzona (Ticino, Switzerland). It is a commercial independent public body owned by the canton Ticino.

AET is a public company founded in 1958, which is active in the selling, production and transport of electricity in Switzerland and abroad. AET's institutional mandate is to guarantee the procurement of electricity for the Canton of Ticino at competitive prices. AET owns and operates a number of hydroelectric and solar generation assets.
