= MDDL =

MDDL (Market Data Definition Language) is an XML-based messaging format for exchanging information related to

- Financial Instruments
- Corporate events related to the financial instruments
- Market-related data

MDDL was developed by FISD (Financial Information Services Division) of SIIA (Software & Information Industry Association). The initiative for the use of XML in market data exchange was started in 2000 and has been gaining industry-wide acceptance.
