= Neas Energy =

Neas Energy logo

Neas Energy (NEAS) is an energy trading and management company. The company deals in electricity, gas, and certificates in the European energy markets.

== History ==
Neas Energy was established in 1998 by four Danish energy supply companies; Aalborg Municipality's Electricity Supply Company: AKE Net, Nyfors Entreprise A/S, Frederikshavn Forsyning A/S, and Thy-Mors Energi Holding A/S. The company has since established an organization with expert capabilities in trading, risk management, and market management for both producers and consumers of energy, and engages in energy trading and energy production management.

Neas Energy was fully acquired by British energy group Centrica plc. in 2016.

== Business areas ==
- Energy Trading
- Energy Production Management
- Balance Responsible Party
- Wind Power
- CHP
