= Energy Community =

International cooperative community

- Logo

- Secretariat: Vienna, Austria
- Member States: European Union Albania; Bosnia and Herzegovina; Kosovo; Moldova; Montenegro; North Macedonia; Serbia; Ukraine; Georgia; Armenia (observer); Norway (observer) Turkey (observer)

Leaders
  - Presidency-in-Office 2024: Bosnia and Herzegovina
  - Vice Presidency-in-Office: (European Union) European Commission
  - Director of Secretariat: (Poland) Artur Lorkowski

Establishment
  - signing of the Treaty: 1 Oct 2005
  - Treaty entry into force: 1 July 2006
- Website www.energy-community.org

The Energy Community, commonly referred to as the Energy Community for South East Europe (ECSEE), is an international organization consisting of the European Union (EU) and a number of non-EU countries. It aims to extend the EU internal energy market to wider Southeast Europe. The members commit to implement relevant EU energy acquis communautaire, to develop an adequate regulatory framework and to liberalize their energy markets in line with the acquis under the founding Treaty.

== Aim ==
The Energy Community aims at establishing a Pan-European energy market by extending the energy acquis of the European Union to the territories of Southeast and Eastern Europe. The Energy Community legal framework covers legislation in the fields of energy, environment, and competition of the EU legislation.

After entry into force, the treaty acquis has been extended on several occasions. It now also includes legislation in relation to security of supply, energy efficiency, oil, renewable energy, statistics, infrastructure and climate.

In line with the update at the EU level, the Energy Community transposes and implements the EU's Third Energy Package since September 2011. The 2021 Ministerial Council adopted five key legislative acts stemming from the EU's Clean energy for all Europeans package. Renewables, energy efficiency and greenhouse gas reduction targets for 2030 will be adopted at the next Ministerial Council in 2022, following the finalization of a study by the European Commission.

== Parties, participants and observers ==
=== Parties ===
Parties to the Energy Community Treaty are the European Union and nine Contracting Parties (date of ratification):

- European Union (29 May 2006) and
- Albania (24 May 2006)
- Bosnia and Herzegovina (20 September 2006)
- Kosovo (23 December 2005)
- Moldova (17 March 2010)
- Montenegro (15 December 2006)
- North Macedonia (29 May 2006)
- Serbia (9 August 2006)
- Ukraine (15 December 2010)
- (Georgia (country)) Georgia (1 July 2017)

After having obtained the observer status, Moldova and Ukraine formally expressed their interest in full membership. Mandated by the Ministerial Council, the European Commission had the first round of formal negotiations with Moldova and Ukraine in late 2008. After three negotiation rounds, the technical negotiations were concluded in 2009. The Ministerial Council, however, made the membership conditional on legislative amendments. In concrete terms, it requested both countries to revise their gas laws and to align them with the EU's Gas Directive 2003/55/EC. Whilst Moldova became a full-fledged member as of 1 May 2010, Ukraine officially acceded to the Energy Community on 1 February 2011.

Georgia applied for full membership in 2014 and joined the organization as a fully-fledged member on 1 July 2017.

=== Observers ===
Any other neighbouring third country can obtain an observer status upon approval of a reasoned request by the Ministerial Council. A separate Procedural Act regulates the rights and obligations of the observers to the Treaty. The observers to the treaty are:

- Norway (November 2006)
- Turkey (November 2006)
- Armenia (October 2011)

=== Participants ===
Pursuant to the treaty, any EU member state may obtain the status of a participant. In doing so, the EU member state has the right to attend the Ministerial Council, the Permanent High Level Group, the Regulatory Board and the fora and participate in the discussions in these bodies. This privilege is used by 19 EU member states, namely

- Austria (17 November 2006)
- Bulgaria (1 January 2007)
- Croatia (17 July 2013)
- Cyprus (17 November 2006)
- Czech Republic (17 November 2006)
- Finland (24 October 2013)
- France (18 December 2007)
- Germany (17 November 2006)
- Greece (17 November 2006)
- Hungary (17 November 2006)
- Italy (17 November 2006)
- Latvia (23 September 2014)
- Lithuania (16 October 2015)
- Netherlands (29 June 2007)
- Poland (6 October 2011)
- Romania (1 January 2007)
- Slovenia (17 November 2006)
- Slovakia (17 November 2006)
- Sweden (23 September 2014)

Following their accession to the European Union, three of the original treaty signatories, Bulgaria, Croatia and Romania, have matured from a Contracting Party to a Participant.

== Institutions ==
The main institutions established by the treaty are:

- Ministerial Council
- Permanent High Level Group
- Energy Community Regulatory Board (ECRB)
- Fora
- Secretariat

=== Ministerial Council ===
The Ministerial Council is the principal decision-making institution of the Energy Community. It takes the key policy decisions and adopts the Energy Community's rules and procedures. The Ministerial Council is composed of one representative from each Contracting Party, usually the Minister responsible for energy, and of two representatives from the European Union, the European Commissioner for Energy and a high-level representative of the Presidency of the European Union.

Following a decision in December 2009, the Ministerial Council meets once a year. Moreover, the Presidency of the council is held in turn by each contracting party for a term of 12 months. For the period of 1 January to 31 December 2021, Serbia holds the presidency in office and chairs the key institutional meetings.

=== Permanent High Level Group ===
The Permanent High Level Group brings together senior officials from each Contracting Party and two representatives of the European Commission. It ensures the continuity of and follow-up to the political meetings by the ministers and decides, in certain cases, on implementing measures.

=== Energy Community Regulatory Board ===
The Regulatory Board is composed of high level representatives from the national energy regulatory agencies of the Energy Community Contracting Parties, Observers and Participants. It advises the Energy Community Ministerial Council and Permanent High Level Group (PHLG) on details of statutory, technical and regulatory rules and makes recommendations in the case of cross-border disputes between regulators. The Board can take regulatory measures when empowered by the Energy Community Ministerial Council.

The Board is currently chaired by its President (2020–2023), Mr Marko Bislimoski, President of the Energy and Water Services Regulatory Commission of the Republic of North Macedonia. The European Union, represented by the European Commission, acts as vice-president and is assisted by the Agency for the Cooperation of Energy Regulators (ACER). The Regulatory Board meets in Athens. Its work is supported by the Energy Community Secretariat.

=== Fora ===
The fora have the task to advise the Energy Community. Chaired by the European Commission, a forum brings together all interested stakeholders from the industry, regulators, industry associations and consumers. Their conclusions, agreed by consensus, are addressed to the Permanent High Level Group.

The establishment of the fora reflects the process leading to the creation of the Energy Community. The Athens Electricity Forum, previously known as South East Europe Energy Regulation Forum, met for the first time in 2002. The terms governing the Gas Forum were established in 2006. It was decided that the Gas Forum shall convene in Slovenia. The first Social Forum took place in November 2008. At its December 2008 meeting, the Ministerial Council decided to adopt oil stock legislation and to establish the Oil Forum. The first Oil Forum convened in 2009 in Belgrade. Recently, also a Vienna Law Forum, Just Transition Forum and Dispute Resolution Forum have been established.

=== Secretariat ===
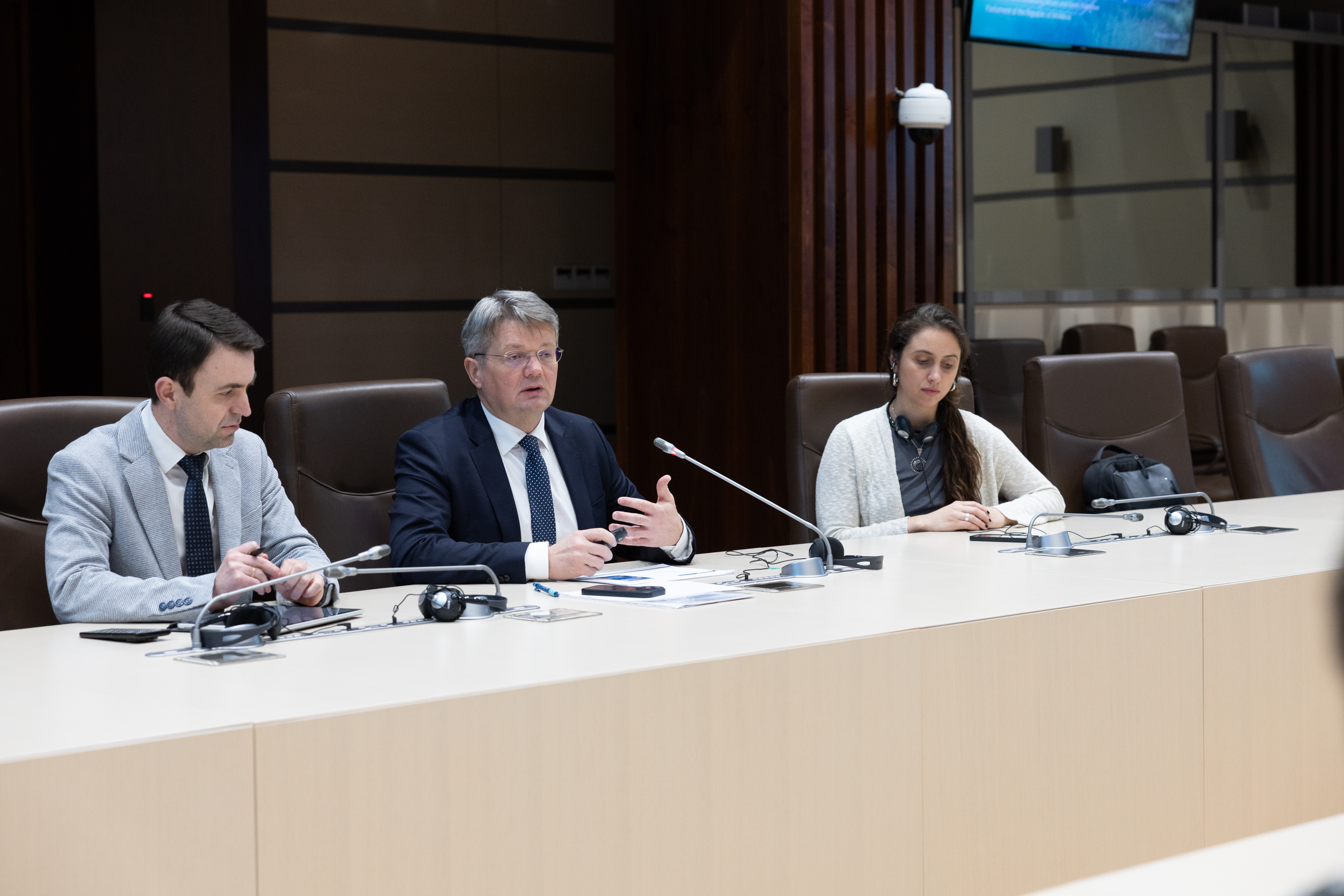
Representatives of the Secretariat, including its director (center), in a meeting in the Parliament of Moldova

The day-to-day activities of the Energy Community are administered by the Secretariat. The Secretariat assists the Contracting Parties in their implementation of the acquis. The Secretariat supports the Contracting Parties in the drafting of legislation and conducts expert missions when requested by the national authorities. The Secretariat organizes annually over 60 events, including institutional meetings and expert workshops.

Each year the Secretariat submits an Annual Implementation Report to the Ministerial Council of the Energy Community, which assesses the compliance of each Contracting Party with respect to its obligations under the treaty. If a Contracting Party fails to comply with its treaty obligations, the Secretariat may open an infringement procedure.

Since 1 December 2021, the director of the Secretariat is Artur Lorkowski. Lorkowski is the third Energy Community director, following Janez Kopač (2012–2021) and Slavtcho Neykov (2007–2012). The director of the Secretariat is responsible for ensuring that the Energy Community budget – to which all Parties contribute – is correctly spent and accounted for. The director also selects and appoints the staff on the basis of the approved establishment plan of the Energy Community. As of December 2021, the Secretariat has 34 staff members holding 18 nationalities.

The Secretariat has its seat in Vienna, Austria.

=== Role of the European Union ===
Represented by the European Commission, the European Union holds the permanent Vice-Presidency of the Energy Community. The European Commission assists the Presidency in the chairing of the Permanent High Level Group and the Ministerial Council and the preparation of agendas of all institutional meetings. At the annual Ministerial Council meeting, the European Commission is represented by the Commissioner for Energy. The European Union is the largest contributor to the Energy Community budget. Its contribution is nearly 95 per cent.

== History ==
The roots of the Energy Community Treaty go back to the South-East Europe Regional Energy Market for electricity and natural gas formed originally in the framework of the Stability Pact for South Eastern Europe through the Athens Memorandum. To this end, the establishment of the Energy Community represents a very important political step in a key economic sector before the accession of the SEE countries to the EU. The institutional setting of the Energy Community shows great parallels to the structures of the European Union. It was in the negotiations for this treaty that the Commission "reproduced" the institutions that were created by the founding fathers of the European Communities and reproduced its own institutions outside its borders. On the occasion of the signing of the Treaty, the European Commission stated that the Energy Community Treaty is consciously modelled on the European Steel and Coal Community that was the genesis for the European Union.

=== Athens Memorandum ===
The 'Athens Memorandum' refers to the memorandum of understanding of 2002 and its revision of 2003, signed in Athens. It was proposed by the European Union and it outlined the principles and the institutional necessities for regional electricity market development in South East Europe. Following intense discussions, an agreement was reached at the first South East Europe Electricity Regulation Forum in June 2002. The signing of the memorandum took place in November 2002 by Albania, Bosnia and Herzegovina, Bulgaria, Croatia, Greece, FYR of Macedonia, Romania, Serbia and Montenegro, and Turkey.

The 2003 revision added natural gas to the scope of work. Under the Athens Memorandum a South-East Europe Regional Energy Market was envisioned to form part of the EU's internal energy market. The Athens Memorandum also set up a number of institutions, which collectively are known as the 'Athens Process'. In 2004, the Athens Forum meeting decided to name the process 'Energy Community'. at the same time the location of future institutions was agreed.

=== Energy Community Treaty ===
In May 2004, the European Union opened negotiations with the countries of the south-eastern European region to conclude a legal agreement. The negotiations took place between the European Community on one side, and Albania, Bosnia and Herzegovina, Bulgaria, Croatia, FYR of Macedonia, Republic of Montenegro, Serbia, Romania, Turkey and UNMIK on behalf of Kosovo on the other side. The treaty establishing the Energy Community was signed in Athens, Greece, on 25 October 2005. Signature of the treaty was approved by the European Parliament on 29 May 2006. The treaty subsequently entered into force on 1 July 2006.

According to Article 97, the Treaty is concluded for a period of 10 years from the date of entry into force. In October 2013, the Energy Community Ministerial Council unilaterally decided to extend the duration of the treaty by ten years, to 2026.

On this occasion, the Ministerial Council also established a High Level Reflection Group, which was mandated to assess the adequacy of the institutional set up and working methods of the Energy Community in achieving the objectives of the Treaty. The Reflection Group published on 11 June 2014 its final report “An Energy Community for the Future”, outlining recommendations on how the Energy Community could be improved. A roadmap has been adopted as to how these proposals should be taken forward.

== Critics ==
The treaty has been criticized by the European Public Service Union as it lacks a social dimension. The Energy Community acquis makes an explicit reference to public service obligations and customer protection. Whilst the Treaty may lack a legally binding acquis on social dialogue, the Contracting Parties have a legally binding obligation to foster social dimension within the process. In October 2007, the Parties signed the Memorandum of Understanding on Social Issues in the context of Energy Community. The Memorandum recognizes that economic development and social progress are mutually linked and should go hand in hand. It also spells out the importance and the necessity to involve social partners in the reform process. Ukraine and Moldova signed the Declaration of Memorandum of Understanding on Social Issues in October 2011.

Environmental organizations from south-eastern Europe criticized the process in December 2008 as they believed that the ECSEE contains insufficient safeguard mechanisms to ensure that the well-intentioned promotion of energy efficiency and renewable energy is not drowned out by the promotion of large and often environmentally harmful coal and hydropower plants. The Energy Community Ministerial Council decided to establish a task force in energy efficiency in 2007. It was renamed in 2013 to Energy Efficiency Coordination Group (EECG), providing a broad platform for cooperation between representatives of ministries and agencies in charge for energy and energy efficiency from Contracting Parties, Observer Countries and Participants. Since 2009 the Energy Community implements the core EU energy efficiency acquis. In the area of renewable energy the discussion to adopt the EU renewable energy directive started already in 2008. The Ministerial Council established a renewable energy task force in 2009 and adopted the Directive 2009/28/EC with binding renewable energy targets for 2020 in October 2012. In October 2015, the ministers decided to re-establish the renewable energy task force. The Energy Community Task Force on Environment has been operational since Spring 2011.

== See also ==
- Energy policy of the European Union
- INOGATE
- Energy Charter Treaty
- Agency for the Cooperation of Energy Regulators
- European Network of Transmission System Operators for Electricity (ENTSO-E)
- European Network of Transmission System Operators for Gas (ENTSO-G)
