= PEPPOL =

Pan-European Public Procurement Online

PEPPOL logo

Peppol is a set of specifications for establishing and also the primary implementation of a federated electronic procurement system for use across different jurisdictions. Through Peppol, participant organisations can deliver procurement documents to each other including electronic invoices in machine readable formats, avoiding the labour of data entry.

OpenPeppol, a non-profit international association registered in Belgium, is the governing body of the primary implementation and developer of specifications. The primary implementation of Peppol as at 26 September 2026 had 8,494,583 participant organisations from 123 countries registered to receive procurement documents.

No other implementations of Peppol are known to be in use by businesses or government bodies around the world. Whilst it would be possible for an alternative Peppol implementation to be created with alternative governance arrangements, Peppol specifications would need to be adjusted to remove dependencies on the OpenPeppol association in aspects including mandatory use of OpenPeppol public key certificates.

== Architecture ==
=== Discovery ===
In an implementation of Peppol, a single central database known as a Service Metadata Locator (SML) lists participants with a unique identifier, the electronic procurement standards supported by each participant and reference to a separate database known as a Service Metadata Publisher (SMP) that each participant has chosen. A Service Metadata Publisher (SMP) extends the information listed on a participant to include technical information on a web application programming interface known as an Access Point (AP) chosen by each participant to deliver procurement documents.

For the primary implementation used worldwide, OpenPeppol, as the governing body, operates the Service Metadata Locator (SML). OpenPeppol only allows participants to be listed in this database if they have registered with an OpenPeppol approved Service Metadata Publisher (SMP). Approval of Service Metadata Publishers (SMPs) is delegated by OpenPeppol to one of numerous country-specific Peppol Authorities (PAs) and is also contingent on candidate Service Metadata Publisher (SMP) organisations being paid members of OpenPeppol. A Peppol Authority (PA) is typically an individual government body for a country and they may impose differing requirements and technical standards on Service Metadata Publishers (SMPs) prior to approval being granted.

=== Delivery ===
Delivery of information in an implementation of Peppol occurs directly between the chosen Access Point (AP) of a sender and receiver, as obtained via the discovery process using the Service Metadata Locator (SML) and relevant Service Metadata Publishers (SMPs). A protocol named eDelivery AS4 (based on AS4) is used to deliver procurement documents between Access Points (APs). Transport Layer Security is used and electronic documents will only be accepted by a receiving Access Point (AP) if the payload has been validated by another submitting Access Point (AP), providing a level of fraud protection against phishing and other confidence tricks.

For the primary implementation used worldwide, OpenPeppol, as the governing body, delegates responsibility to Peppol Authorities (PAs) to approve Access Point (AP) service providers. Approval of Access Point (AP) service providers is additionally contingent on the service provider being a paid member of OpenPeppol. Peppol Authorities (PAs) may impose additional differing requirements and technical standards on Access Point (AP) service providers.

== Governance ==
Peppol specification development and the primary implementation are governed by the OpenPeppol Association. The highest managing body is the General Assembly, which elects the Secretary General and the Managing Committee responsible for the operations. Development is prepared in the work groups handling specific tasks and owned by a management team member. The work groups function on a volunteer basis, though many of the members are actually sent to the work group by either their employer or client, for example a specific user.

== History ==
Peppol originated via a project with the same name (with an uppercase stylised acronym) under the European Union Competitiveness and Innovation Programme from May 2008 to August 2012. The European Union provided funding of over 15 million Euros to support the development of Peppol. A consortium of 11 European countries being Austria, Denmark, Finland, France, Germany, Greece, Italy, Norway, Portugal, Sweden and the United Kingdom also contributed to the development of Peppol over this period.

The goal of the project was to solve interoperability issues in electronic public procurement by aligning business processes using common standards, addressing common legal issues and developing open source technologies. Agreement on the common standards for document content and on the technical aspects was reached through consensus amongst consortium members.

After the project ended the OpenPeppol Association was founded in Belgium on the 1st of September 2012 to continue the work on the framework.

== Adoption ==
Peppol is widely used in many European countries:

- Denmark: All public institutions are required to support e-invoicing using Peppol.
- Ireland: Public bodies are required to accept e-invoices, and Ireland has chosen Peppol as the supported technology.
- Norway: E-invoicing is mandatory in public institutions with Peppol recommended, and Peppol invoices are widely used.
- Austria: E-invoicing is mandatory for the federal government. Peppol is supported as one of the technologies.
- Italy: E-invoicing is mandatory in Italy. The Italian Peppol Authority is managed by AgID, the agency for digital transformation of the Italian public sector, and was established through initiatives directed by Roberto Reale and Carmen Ciciriello.
- Sweden: Accepting Peppol is mandatory in the public sector.
- Germany: Public bodies are required to accept Peppol e-invoices.
- UK: Peppol is an "integral part" of the English National Health Service's eProcurement Strategy. Supply Chain Coordination Limited (SCCL) / NHS Supply Chain uses Peppol formats extensively in the English NHS: supplier use became mandatory on 1 October 2019. Crown Commercial Service formerly operated a framework agreement allowing public bodies to access Peppol services, although this is no longer available.
- Finland: Suppliers to the Finnish government must be able to exchange Peppol order and order response messages.
- Netherlands: While Peppol e-invoicing is not mandatory in the Netherlands, the central government strongly advises its use.
- Belgium: B2B invoicing mandatory from January 1, 2026. Adopting the Peppol approach in B2G eInvoicing and promoting its adoption for B2B exchanges. Over 1 million businesses now rely on Peppol for electronic invoicing in Belgium, becoming the first country to pass this milestone

Outside Europe, Singapore became the first Peppol Authority outside Europe in May 2018. Its Nationwide E-invoicing Initiative is based on the Peppol technologies. In Japan, Digital Agency, Government of Japan became a Peppol Authority in September 2021. Peppol has also been considered as the e-invoicing solution in Australia and New Zealand. Malaysia introduced Peppol e-invoicing to drive digital transformation and in alignment with its national e-invoicing framework.
