= Regulation on Wholesale Energy Market Integrity and Transparency =

Regulation on Wholesale Energy Market Integrity and Transparency (REMIT) is an EU regulation designed to increase the transparency and stability of the European energy markets while combating insider trading and market manipulation. REMIT was adopted in the European Union in 2011. Part of the regulation went into immediate effect in all EU member states, with some obligations around registration and transaction reporting only coming into effect once the REMIT Implementing Acts have been passed. The EU agency ACER has been tasked with the supervision and regulation of energy markets in accordance with REMIT.

== EU Legislation ==
In October 2011, the European Parliament and the European Council adopted Regulation (EU) No. 1227/2011, Regulation on Wholesale Energy Market Integrity and Transparency (REMIT). REMIT entered into force on 28 December 2011, twenty days after publication in the EU Official Journal.

The collection of transactions on the wholesale energy market as prescribed in Article 8 data is not yet implemented. Transaction reporting will begin nine months after the publication of the REMIT Implementing Acts, which happened on December 18, 2014. Thus initially, REMIT is limited to the prohibition and mandatory reporting of insider trading and market manipulation, as well as the obligation to publish inside information.

In preparation of the Implementing Acts, the EU Directorate-General responsible for the regulation, DG Energy, commissioned a market consultation and report on the implementation of a data and transaction reporting Framework for REMIT in 2012.

== Content of REMIT ==
REMIT has four main elements:

- Prohibition of insider trading (Article 3) and of market manipulation (Article 5)
- Obligation of market participants to register with their competent National Regulatory Agency (Article 9)
- Obligation of market participants to report wholesale energy market transactions (Article 8) and to publish insider information (Article 4)
- Authorisation of ACER to implement REMIT, in particular to monitor the market (Article 7), to collect transaction reports (Article 8) and to register market participants (Article 9)

The REMIT definition of a "market participant" applies to any legal or natural person carrying out transactions in wholesale energy products. In particular, the definition encompasses energy traders, transmission system operators, regulated exchanges for electricity or gas markets and energy brokers.

The REMIT definition of "wholesale energy products" includes physical and financial contracts for electricity or for natural gas where delivery is in the European Union. In particular, the definition includes the supply, transportation contracts and derivative transactions, such as options or swaps. Supply and distribution contracts to consumers and industrial clients consuming less than 600 GWh per year are excluded from REMIT. Transactions already reported under EMIR do not have to be reported again under REMIT.

The reporting of wholesale energy market transactions is mandatory for both parties to the transaction, seller and buyer. The resulting records can be linked by ACER using the Unique Transaction Identifier (UTI), which is a field in the report being unique in the market and identical for both sides of the report. In practice, this requirement is difficult to fulfill for purely bilateral transactions.

== REMIT in national law ==
As an EU regulation, REMIT comes into force directly in all EU Member States. However, enforcement and sanctioning of possible violations remains the responsibility of Member States. Accordingly, the competencies of national regulatory authorities (NRAs) and the nature of sanctions have to be legislated in national law. In 2014, the Council of European Energy Regulators (CEER) issued a report on the implementation of REMIT at national level. The report concluded that no more than ″a majority of Member States have completed the transposition of Articles 13 and 18 of REMIT into national law in order to ensure that NRAs have the foreseen investigatory and enforcement powers, and that a sanctioning regime is in place.″

== See also ==
- Nord Pool
