= Third Energy Package =

European Union regulations for oil, gas and electricity

The European Union's Third Energy Package is a legislative package for an internal gas and electricity market in the European Union. Its purpose is to further open up the gas and electricity markets in the European Union. The package was proposed by the European Commission in September 2007, and adopted by the European Parliament and the Council of the European Union in July 2009. It entered into force on 3 September 2009.

Core elements of the third package include ownership unbundling, which stipulates the separation of companies' generation and sale operations from their transmission networks, and the establishment of a National regulatory authority (NRA) for each Member State, and the Agency for the Cooperation of Energy Regulators (ACER) which provides a forum for NRAs to work together.

== The EU energy market ==
The European Commission and the Parliament wants to reach the goals of "Europe 2020 Strategy" through a secure, competitive and sustainable supply of energy to the economy and the society. The correct transposition of the European electricity and gas legislation in all Member States is still not complete. Because of this, the Third Internal Energy Market Package was adopted in 2009 to accelerate investments in energy infrastructure to enhance cross border trade and access to diversified sources of energy. There is still a market concentration on the energy market in the European Union, where a small number of companies control a large part of the market. Together, the three biggest generators of each country hold more than two thirds of the total generating capacity of 840,000 MW. The EU advises three options to weaken the market power of the biggest electricity firms: ownership unbundling, independent system operator (ISO) and independent transmission operators (ITO).

== Legislation ==
The Third Energy Package consists of two Directives and three Regulations:

- Directive 2009/72/EC
- Directive 2009/73/EC
- Regulation (EC) No 713/2009
- Regulation (EC) No 714/2009
- Regulation (EC) No 715/2009

== Potential options for member states ==
=== Ownership unbundling ===
Ownership unbundling is advocated by the European Commission and the European Parliament. This option is intended to split generation (production of electricity) from transmission (of electricity from electrical generating station via a system to a distribution system operator or to the consumer). The purpose of this system is to ensure that the European energy market can't be vertically integrated. The proposal is controversial, with questions as to who can buy the transmission networks, whether such a system will regulate the market-place and who will pay possible compensation to the energy firms. Moreover, some economists also argue that the benefits will not exceed the costs. Some further problems have to do with possible inequalities that may arise during the implementation of the framework between undertakings from Member States with a different organisation of the market structure. A suggested solution refers to the better development of the level playing field clause.

=== Independent system operator (ISO) ===
The Art. 13 – 16 of directive 2009/72/EC give the member states also the opportunity to let the transmission networks remain under the ownership of energy groups, but transferring operation and control of their day-to-day business to an independent system operator. Investments on the network will be accomplished, not only by the owner's funding but also by the ISO's management. It is also a form of ownership unbundling, but with a trustee. In theory, this would allow transmission and generation to remain under the same owner, but would remove conflicts of interest.

=== Independent transmission operator (ITO) ===
Austria, Bulgaria, France, Germany, Greece, Luxembourg, Latvia and the Slovak Republic presented at the end of January 2008 a proposal for a third option. This model, the ITO, envisages energy companies retaining ownership of their transmission networks, but the transmission subsidiaries would be legally independent joint stock companies operating under their own brand name, under a strictly autonomous management and under stringent regulatory control. However, investment decisions would be made jointly by the parent company and the regulatory authority. In order to exclude discrimination against competitors, one prerequisite is the existence of a compliance officer, who is assigned to monitor a specific programme of relevant measures against market abuse. It is also named a legal unbundling.

=== ITO+ ===
There are also provisions for an alternative fourth choice for Member States. This option that may be referred as ITO+ or unbundling a la carte as States may keep their own system, provided it already existed in 2009, concerned a vertically integrated transmission system and it included provisions that ensure a higher independence status for the operation of the system than that of ITO.

== National Regulatory Authorities ==
=== Establishment ===
Chapter IX of Directive 2009/72/EC requires each Member State to designate a single National Regulatory Authority (NRA). Member States may designate other regulatory authorities for regions within the Member State, but there must be a senior representative at national level. Member States must ensure that the NRA is able to carry out its regulatory activities independently from government and from any other public or private entity.

=== Functions ===
The Directive sets out eight general objectives of NRAs and 21 specific duties. In addition to a duty to fix or approve tariffs, NRAs have a number of monitoring and reporting duties, and are granted information rights and investigative and enforcement powers to enable them to carry out their duties.

=== Agency for Cooperation of Energy Regulators ===
Regulation 713/2009 establishes an Agency for the Cooperation of Energy Regulators (ACER). The purpose of the Agency is to assist NRAs to exercise their duties and to provide means of coordinating their actions where necessary.

== Significance ==
The now repealed Directive 2003/54/EC gave member states three possible ways to unbundle. One of them has to be transposed into national law. The United Kingdom, for example, has already implemented ownership unbundling.

== Literature ==
- Diathesopoulos, Michael D. (2011). "Ownership Unbundling in European Energy Market & Legal Problems under EU Law". Piraeus Case-Law. 2011 (3): 248–262.
- Diathesopoulos, Michael D. (20 March 2012). Competition Law and Sector Regulation in the European Energy Market after the Third Energy Package: Hierarchy and Efficiency. University of Cambridge Faculty of Law. SSRN 2026607.
- Pielow, Johann-Christian; Brunekreeft, Gert; Ehlers, Eckart (1 July 2009). "Legal and economic aspects of ownership unbundling in the EU". Journal of World Energy Law § Business. 2 (2): 96–116. doi:10.1093/jwelb/jwp001.
- Pollitt, Michael (February 2008). "The arguments for and against ownership unbundling of energy transmission networks". Energy Policy. 36 (2): 704–713. Bibcode:2008EnPol..36..704P. doi:10.1016/j.enpol.2007.10.011.
