= European Energy Exchange =

European exchange

EEX
- European Energy Exchange AG
- Type: Physical commodity and derivates exchange (energy)
- Location: Leipzig, Germany
- Coordinates: 51.3379628°N 12.3790781°E
- Founded: 2002
- Key people: Tobias Paulun (CEO); Götz Dittrich (COO); Steffen Köhler (CCO); Jens Rick (CIO); Anja Kiessling (CFO)
- Currency: EUR
- Commodities: Electric power Natural gas CO_{2} Emission Allowances; Guarantees of Origin
- Website: www.eex.com

European Energy Exchange (EEX) AG is a central European electric power and related commodities exchange located in Leipzig, Germany. It develops, operates and connects markets for energy and related products, including power derivative contracts, emission allowances, agricultural and freight products.

== History ==
The EEX emerged as a result of a merger between LPX Leipzig Power Exchange and the Frankfurt-based EEX in 2002. Deutsche Börse Group's derivatives business unit Eurex acquired the majority share in the EEX in March 2011.

== Ownership and subsidiaries ==
EEX AG is majority owned by Deutsche Börse. It holds shares in the following companies:

- EEX Asia, Cleartech (Cleartrade Exchange Pte Ltd.) (100%)
- EEX CEGH Gas Exchange Services GmbH (51%)
- EEX Link GmbH (100%)
- Enermarket GmbH (40%)
- EPEX SPOT SE (51%)
- European Commodity Clearing AG (100%)
- Grexel Systems Ltd. (100%)
- KB Tech Ltd. (100%)
- Lacima Group (100%)
- Nodal Exchange Holdings, LLC (100%)
- Power Exchange Central Europe a.s. (66,67%)
- Spark Pte. Ltd. (25%)

EEX announced in 2017 that it had reached an agreement to acquire the US-based Nodal Exchange. [2]

== Trading volume ==
In 2025, the total trading of electricity on the EEX Group Power amounted to 13,494 TWh (terawatt hours), compared with 12,359 TWh in 2024. In the year 2025, a total of 918 TWh was traded on the Power Spot Markets of EPEX SPOT (2024: 880 TWh), while the Power Derivates Markets reached 12,574 TWh. In the field of natural gas, the volume traded on the EEX amounted to 8,823 TWh, a 24 percent increase compared with the previous year (2024: 7,099 TWh). The EEX European emissions markets recorded a total volume of 1,316.3 million tonnes of CO_{2}.

== Spot market ==
The spot market for electricity is operated by EPEX SPOT, a joint venture owned by German EEX AG and French Powernext SAS (its 100% subsidiary). Each day of the year, EPEX SPOT conducts day-ahead auctions for three market areas: Germany/Austria, France, and Switzerland. Physical delivery of power occurs the following day.

EPEX SPOT also offers an intraday market for Germany, France, Belgium, the Netherlands, Luxembourg, Switzerland, Austria, and the United Kingdom. The market, which operates continuously without exceptions, can be utilized to meet short-term electricity needs or to trade excess capacity. Participants can purchase electricity up to 45 minutes before each hour for that specific hour. Trading for electricity on the following day can start from 15:00.

The ability to trade all day on the natural gas spot market was introduced in 2011. On the spot market, companies can trade natural gas on a continuous basis for the current day (within a day), one day, and two days in advance, as well as for the following weekend. Since the launch of 24/7 trading, EEX has also offered seamless trading with a minimum lot size of 1 MW (in addition to 10 MW contracts). Short-term gas quantities can be traded on the exchange for delivery in the market areas GASPOOL, NetConnect Germany (NCG), and the Dutch Title Transfer Facility (TTF).

EEX also offers a spot market for EU allowances, having operated both spot and derivatives markets in emission allowances since 2005. EEX currently runs a secondary market for continuous trading on a spot and derivatives basis for EU ETS allowances (EUA, EUAA) and Kyoto credits (CER, ERU).

As of March 26, 2008, it is possible to trade CER futures on the EEX (Certified Emission Reductions) global emission credits in accordance with the Kyoto Protocol. On April 14, 2008, EEX and Eurex launched trading of options on EUA Futures. Since January 2010, EEX AG has run the auctioning of the emission allowances issued by the Federal Ministry of the Environment. All trading participants admitted to trading in emission allowances on EEX are able to take part in the auction without any further preconditions regarding licensing. From the very beginning, this also included all trading participants taking part in the existing Eurex cooperation on the derivatives market. In addition, EEX also carries out the EUA auctions for other countries (Poland, Hungary).

In February 2012, EEX was selected as the transitory auctioning platform for EUAs auctioned by Germany for the third emissions trading period, and as a cooperation exchange for the NER300 program of the European Investment Bank (EIB). As of April 30, 2012, emission allowances for the aviation industry (EU Aviation Allowances, or EUAA) were made available for trading. Futures on Emission Reduction Units (ERU) were launched at the end of April 2012. In March, EEX extended the futures on Certified Emission Reductions (CER) for all maturities of the third trading period.

== Derivatives market ==
Participants on the EEX can trade power contracts (weeks, months, quarters, and years) up to 6 years in the future. The Power Futures are financially settled contracts, but they can be physically delivered in Germany, France, Austria, Belgium, the Netherlands, and Italy. Besides electricity and natural gas futures (market areas GASPOOL and NCG), a broad range of CO_{2} derivatives (futures on EUA, CER, EUAA, and ERU) can be traded at the EEX-Derivatives market.

== Clearing and settlement ==
The clearing and settlement of all exchange transactions are done by the European Commodity Clearing AG (ECC). ECC was founded in 2006 with the transfer of the EEX clearing activities to this subsidiary. Specialized in the physical delivery of energy products, ECC is a dedicated clearing provider for 10 exchanges: European Energy Exchange (EEX), EPEX SPOT, Powernext, and Power Exchange Central Europe (PXE), as well as the partner exchanges HUPX, HUDEX, NOREXECO, SEEPEX, and SEMOpx. Furthermore, EEX and ECC provide the service of trade registration. This service enables the trading participants and the trade registration participants to conclude transactions through registration by mutual agreement or to have over-the-counter transactions registered.

== Transparency ==
EEX operates "Transparency in Energy Markets," the neutral platform for energy market data that fulfills the statutory publication requirements and implements the market participants' voluntary commitments. The platform was established by EEX and the four German transmission system operators and launched in October 2009. In 2011, the Austrian transmission system operator Austrian Power Grid AG joined the cooperation. EEX is in charge of the operation of the platform, which comprises plausibility checking, anonymization, aggregation, and publication of the data reported.

On September 2, 2014, the European Energy Exchange (EEX) launched its new transparency site. At www.eex-transparency.com, visitors can gain access to comprehensive fundamental data and relevant information for wholesale energy trading. The website is a further development of the existing platform "Transparency in Energy Market" and contains information about the capacity, utilization, and availability of facilities for the production of electricity, as well as new information on the storage of electricity and natural gas consumption.

== See also ==
- Nord Pool AS
