= European Union Agency for the Cooperation of Energy Regulators =

Agency of the European Union

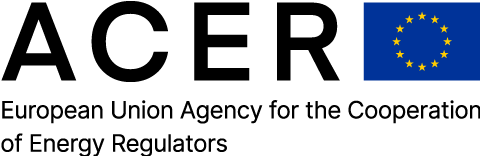

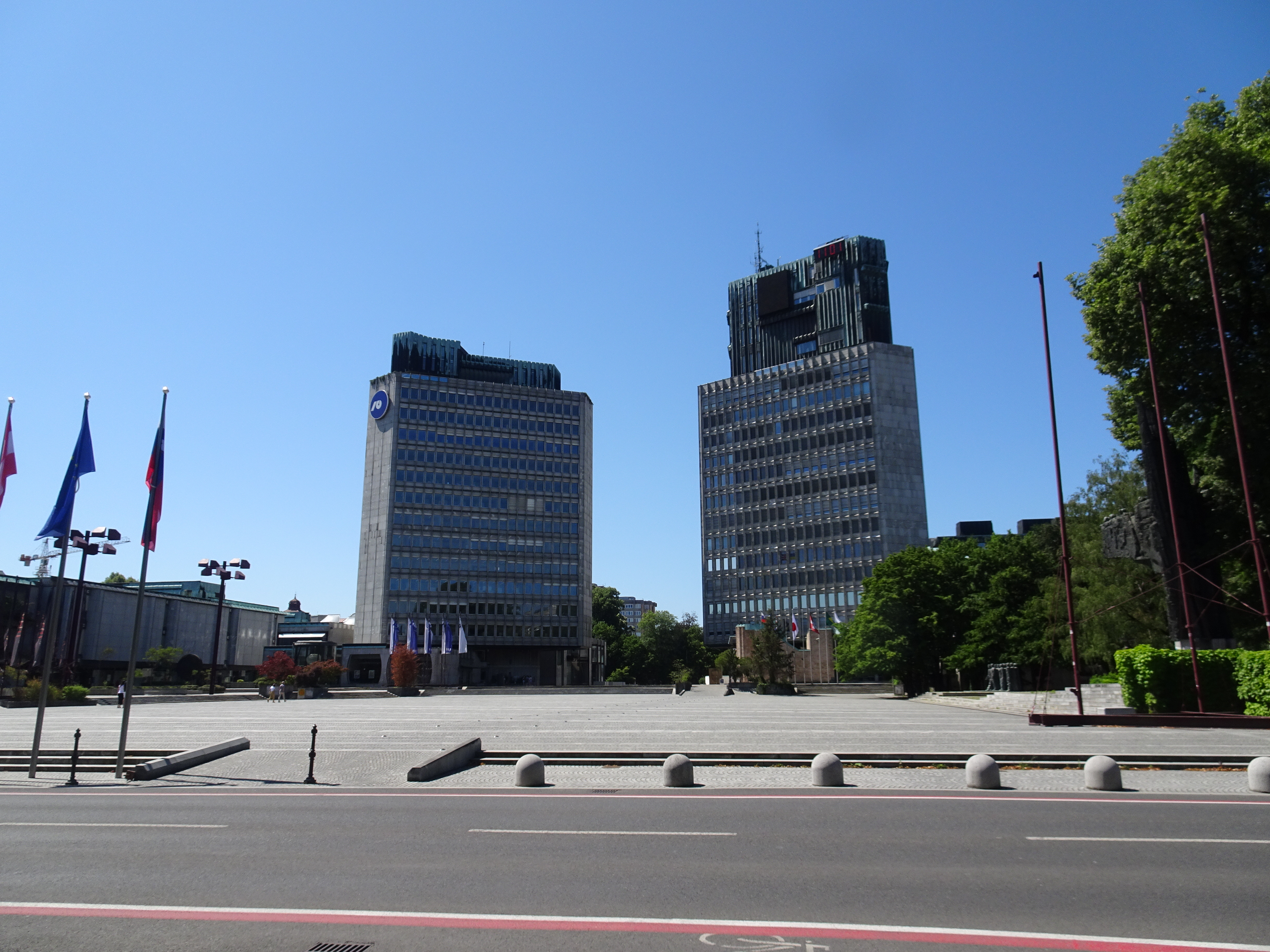
- Trg republike 3 building (right) in Ljubljana, seat of ACER since 2011

Agency overview
- Formed: 3 September 2009
- Jurisdiction: European Union
- Headquarters: Ljubljana, Slovenia
- Employees: 191 (2024)
- Agency executive: Christian Pilgaard Zinglersen, Director
- Key document: Regulation (EU) 2019/942
- Website: www.acer.europa.eu/

Map
- European Union Agency for the Cooperation of Energy Regulators (European Union)

The European Union Agency for the Cooperation of Energy Regulators (ACER) is an Agency of the European Union created under the terms of the Third Energy Package of 2009. It was established in 2010 and has its seat in Ljubljana, Slovenia.

The basis for the establishment of ACER is Regulation 713/2009 of the European Parliament and the Council of 13 July 2009. The regulation describes the establishment and the legal status, tasks, organisation and financial provisions. The Agency's mandate was updated in 2019 by Regulation (EU) 2019/942.

ACER is the second intergovernmental organization headquartered in Slovenia. The first was the International Center for Promotion of Enterprises (ICPE).

== Tasks ==
The Agency's roles include:

- Complementing and coordinating the work of national regulatory authorities.
- Participating in the creation of European network rules.
- Taking, under certain conditions, binding individual decisions on terms and conditions for access and operational security for cross border infrastructure.
- Giving advice on various energy-related issues to the European institutions.
- Monitoring and reporting developments at the European energy markets, primarily on the framework of the Regulation on Wholesale Energy Market Integrity and Transparency (REMIT), and deterring wholesale energy market manipulation and abusive behaviour. In May 2021, the Agency updated its guidance on REMIT.

== Capacity calculation regions ==
In July 2015, Regulation (EU) 2015/1222 established the guideline on capacity allocation and congestion management. From 17 November 2015, all European transmission system operators submitted a proposal for capacity calculation regions. Bidding zone borders within and between EU Member States are grouped into eight capacity calculation regions:

- Capacity Calculation Region 1: Nordic
- Capacity Calculation Region 2: Hansa
- Capacity Calculation Region 3: Core
- Capacity Calculation Region 4: Italy North
- Capacity Calculation Region 5: Greece-Italy
- Capacity Calculation Region 6: South-west Europe (SWE)
- Capacity Calculation Region 7: Baltic
- Capacity Calculation Region 8: South-east Europe (SEE)

== Market transparency and price regulation ==
=== Market Correction Mechanism ===
The Market Correction Mechanism (MCM) was introduced by the EU in 2022 in response to exceptionally high gas prices in 2022. Its aim was to limit extreme gas price spikes on the Title Transfer Facility (TTF), the main European gas benchmark. ACER was responsible for monitoring the market and triggering the mechanism if certain conditions were met, including a price ceiling of €180/MWh being exceeded for a sustained period. The mechanism was designed to safeguard security of supply while preventing market manipulation and excessive volatility amid the Russia-European Union gas dispute and the global energy crisis. The Agency was required to publish the MCM reference price starting from 1 February 2023 until 31 January 2025. The MCM mechanism was never activated.

=== LNG Price Assessment and Benchmark ===
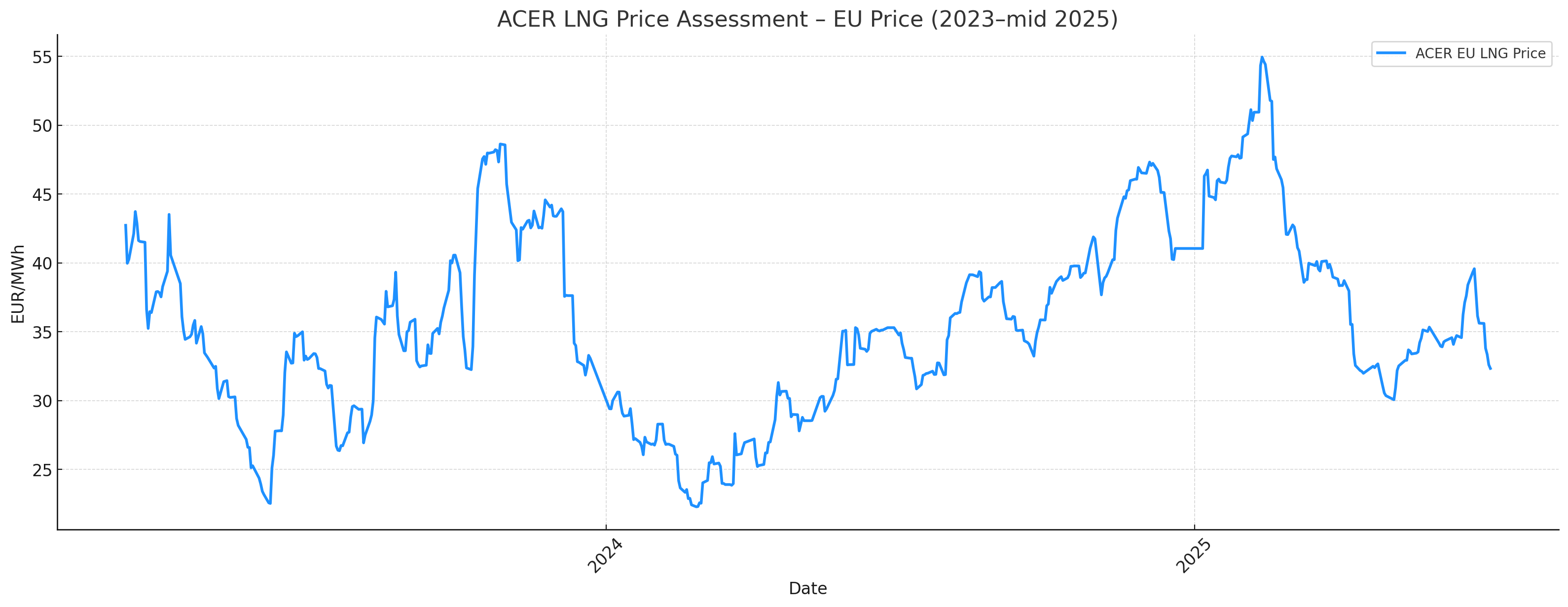
ACER LNG Price Assessment

In 2023, ACER launched the LNG Price Assessment and Benchmark as part of efforts to improve price transparency in the liquefied natural gas market. The main aim is to provide a reliable and representative reference for LNG prices in the EU, supporting better market functioning and reducing the bloc’s dependence on volatile external benchmarks. The LNG benchmark is based on validated transactional data submitted by market participants under REMIT obligations.

=== REMIT Data Reference Centre ===
In response to the 2024 revision of the REMIT Regulation, ACER established the REMIT Data Reference Centre, inaugurated in May 2025. This centralised hub consolidates wholesale energy market data submitted under REMIT across the European Union. The available datasets include:

- Electricity markets datasets
- Natural gas markets datasets
- LNG markets dataset
- Market participants dataset

== See also ==
- Energy Community
- European Network of Transmission System Operators for Electricity (ENTSO-E)
- European Network of Transmission System Operators for Gas (ENTSOG)
- Council of European Energy Regulators (CEER)
- European Regulators' Group for Electricity and Gas (ERGEG)
