= European Network of Transmission System Operators for Gas =

- Abbreviation: ENTSOG
- Predecessor: GTE
- Formation: 1 December 2009; 16 years ago
- Type: association
- Headquarters: Avenue de Cortenbergh 100 / Kortenberglaan 100; Brussels, Belgium
- Region served: Europe
- Members: transmission system operators
- Official language: English
- President: Bart Jan Hoevers
- General Director: Piotr Kus
- Main organ: General Assembly
- Website: www.entsog.eu

The European Network of Transmission System Operators for Gas (ENTSOG) is an association of Europe's transmission system operators (TSOs). ENTSOG was created on 1 December 2009 by 31 TSOs from 21 European countries. Creation of the ENTSOG was initiated by the adoption of the European Union third legislative package on the gas and electricity markets. It aims to promote the completion and cross-border trade for gas on the European internal market, and development of the European natural gas transmission network. According to the third energy package ENTSOG is required to develop an EU-wide ten-year gas network development plan.

== See also ==
- Agency for the Cooperation of Energy Regulators
- European Energy Community
- European Network of Transmission System Operators for Electricity (ENTSO-E)
- Nord Pool
