= European Market Infrastructure Regulation =

Regulation on financial systems

European Parliament and Council of the European Union
- Passed: December 19, 2012
- Enacted: March 15, 2013
- Status: Current legislation

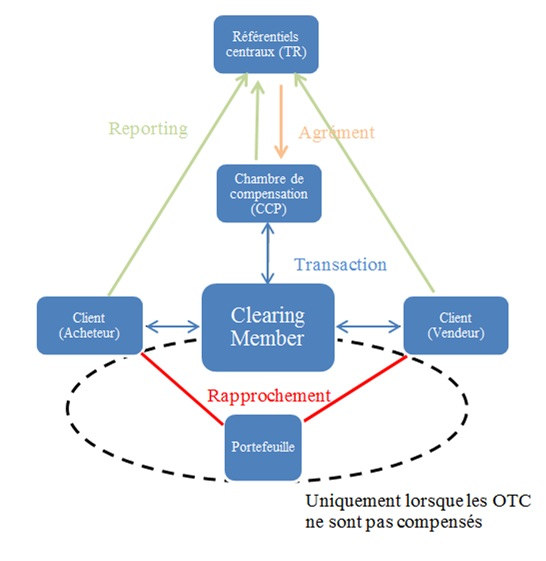
EMIR scheme

The European Market Infrastructure Regulation (EMIR) is an EU regulation aimed at reducing systemic counterparty and operational risk and thereby preventing future financial system collapses. Its focus is regulation of over-the-counter (OTC) derivatives, central counterparties and trade repositories. It provides steer on reporting of derivative contracts, implementation of risk management standards and common rules for central counterparties and trade repositories.

The regulation was initially adopted in 2012 and an amended version, the EMIR Refit regulation, was later on adopted in 2019.

== Overview ==
The European Market Infrastructure Regulation (EMIR) is EU regulation for over-the-counter (OTC) derivatives, central counterparties and trade repositories. EMIR was introduced by the European Union (EU) as implementation of the G20 commitment to reduce systemic, counterparty and operational risk, and increase transparency in the OTC derivatives market. It was also designed as a preventative measure to avoid fallout during possible future financial crises similar to the collapse that followed the Lehman Brothers bankruptcy in 2008.

It establishes common rules for central counterparties, which interpose themselves between involved parties in a contract to serve as the focal point of each trade, and trade repositories, which collect and maintain all records of trades. EMIR requires the reporting of all derivatives, whether OTC or exchange traded, to a trade repository. EMIR covers entities that qualify for derivative contracts in regards to interest rate, equity, foreign exchange, or credit and commodity derivatives. It also outlines three sets of obligations, including the clearing, reporting and risk mitigation of applicable products.

EMIR's set of obligations was designed to take effect on a phased basis over a period of several years.

== Key aspects ==
Entities that qualify for EMIR must report every derivative contract they enter into to a trade repository. They must also implement new risk management standards according to EMIR, including operational processes and margining related to their bilateral OTC derivatives. EMIR also covers trades that are not cleared by a central counterparty, and entities that qualify must submit all OTC derivatives subject to a mandatory clearing obligation for review. Counterparties must file reports wherever they enter into derivatives transactions, in the European Economic Area or elsewhere.

=== Clearing ===
The European Securities and Markets Authority (ESMA) applies mandatory clearing obligations for specific OTC derivative contracts if a contract has been assigned a central counterparty under EMIR. The obligations require that over-the-counter derivatives trades are cleared through central counterparties. EMIR granted a temporary exemption from these guidelines to pension funds until August 2017. This exemption was further extended in a review of the regulation until 18 June 2021.

All parties involved in trades must submit timely notifications of approaching, exceeding, and no longer exceeding the clearing threshold as defined by EMIR. This clearing regulation applies to financial counterparties such as banks, insurers, and managers of assets, as well as non-financial counterparties.

=== Reporting ===
EMIR requires that all entities entering into derivative contracts must submit reports to their corresponding trade repositories, outlining each over-the-counter trade. These mandatory reports must also include a Unique Transaction Identifier (UTI), legal entity identifier (LEI), information on the trading capacity of the counterparty, and the marked-to-market valuation of the position. The counterparty data in a report includes 26 fields for data and the common data includes 59 fields of data. These fields include an LEI, or a unique 20 digit alphanumeric code that may be used for eight of the 26 counterparty data fields, and the unique trade identifier, which are generated based on the report's LEI.

Block trades, which are large-scale transactions of shares, and any subsequent allocations must be reported to the fund manager, but block trades concluded by a TR are not subject to the obligation. If the block trade is allocated to the manager's individual funds on the trade date, only the allocations need to be reported. In the event that the block trade is not allocated on the trade date, the block itself must be reported with the fund manager as counterparty.

=== Risk mitigation ===
One of EMIR's central purposes is to manage and avoid systemic risk. EMIR, and other legislation like it, aim to reduce systemic risk in part by increasing regulations on clearing and trading, which decreases returns and industry efforts. Under EMIR, the risk mitigation regime applies to contracts involving both EU countries and over the counter derivative contracts involving third country entities. The risk mitigation standards outlined in EMIR's Article 11 impose risk management regulation on bilateral derivatives, as these derivatives are not appropriate for standard central counterparty clearing.

EMIR also advises against charging Front-End Loads on over the counter derivatives, or applying any associated fees to sellers alone, as this practice typically increases systemic risk. Other risk mitigation techniques as defined by EMIR include timely submission of reports and confirmations of adherence to regulation by all counterparties, and open reconciliation and compression of portfolios between involved parties. Other techniques include a new dispute resolution process, daily market reports and exchanges and the public exchange of collateral between parties.

== History ==
=== Level 1 ===
Regulation (EU) No 648/2012, as EMIR is referred to in European legal documentation, was implemented in 2012 through the standard co-decision procedure of the Council of the European Union, and the European Parliament, which set out a detailed framework for the legislation.

The European Securities and Markets Authority (ESMA) began developing technical standards on regulation of OTC derivatives, central counterparties and trade repositories to implement EMIR in February 2012. ESMA released a discussion paper on the topic, and in March 2012, the Authority held a public discussion in Paris to receive input on the questions put forth in the discussion paper.

=== Level 2 ===
On June 25, 2012, ESMA released a consultation paper publicizing its proposed technical standards. In July, ESMA hosted another open hearing in Paris. The authority released a final draft technical standards to the European Commission on September 27, 2012.

EMIR entered into force on August 16, 2012, but most of its provisions only began to apply after a regulation's technical standards take place. These technical standards were adopted by the European Commission on December 19, 2012.

After more discussion and public reports, EMIR was published in the Official Journal of the European Union on July 27, 2012, and the technical standards of EMIR came into effect on March 15, 2013.

Many involved parties expressed difficulty reporting during the first six months of the regulations being in effect, and many experienced delays in reporting.

In July 2013, the European Commission adopted a Delegated EMIR Regulation to include the central banks and debt management offices in Japan and the United States to be exempt from EMIR. On July 12, 2013, ESMA published a discussion paper specifically describing the clearing obligation as defined by EMIR. The discussion was closed on September 16, 2013.

In August 2013, UK Parliament reviewed a second EMIR statutory instrument, which outlines additional supervisory and enforcement powers allotted to central counterparties during trading and clearing.

In September 2013, new obligations embedded into EMIR took effect, requiring EU banks and their counterparties to discuss and agree on processes and procedures for portfolio reconciliation and dispute resolution of derivatives executed in the OTC market. In October 2013, in response to the reported difficulties, ESMA announced that trade repositories should send back incomplete reports to counterparties, asking for their rectification, instead of trying to reconcile them. In November 2013, ESMA published the final draft on EMIR's technical standards in regards to non-EU counterparties. In January 2014, mandatory transaction reporting for OTC derivatives began under EMIR.

On October 1, 2014, ESMA began a consultation on EMIR's clearing obligation. The consultation closed on November 6, 2014. ESMA published the eleventh iteration of its Q&A report on EMIR on October 24, 2014. In the report, ESMA announced that any third country firm not originally subject to EMIR trade reporting obligations that subsequently becomes a financial counterparty subject to EMIR must comply with the EMIR reporting obligation in respect of all outstanding derivatives contracts.

ESMA conducted another consultation on the technical standards of reporting under EMIR between November 10, 2014 and February 3, 2015.

Mandatory reporting for exchange-traded derivatives began in January 2015, and in February of the same year, a European Commission report recommended an extension to the exemption until August 2017. As of March 2015, EMIR's regulations are under analysis in regards to pension funds, with the possibility of extending the extension to 2018. As of May 5, 2015, ESMA has been discussing a fourth consultation, this time revisiting the clearing obligation under EMIR. The 2013 report on clearing indicated a need for further analysis of the classes of OTC interest rate derivatives denominated in other currencies than the ones included in the first report, and the 2015 consultation is expected to present new analysis and invite discussion on these other currencies. The consultation is expected to conclude on July 15, 2015.

=== Level 1 Review ===
A review of the regulation was published in the EU Official Journal on May 28, 2019. The review, known as EMIR Refit, was proposed by the European Commission to minimise the compliance burden on small financial and non-financial counterparties. Among other changes, the thresholds to be subject to the clearing obligations have been revised and an obligation for financial counterparties to report trades on behalf of non-financial counterparties has been introduced.

== See also ==
- Swap Execution Facility
- Trade Repository
- European Securities and Markets Authority
- European Systemic Risk Board
- Markets in Financial Instruments Directive
