= 2020s commodities boom =

Commodity price increases following the COVID-19 pandemic

The 2020s were marked by extreme volatility and a broad and sustained rise in commodity prices, driven by successive supply shocks and demand-side factors.

The early stages of the boom have been attributed to a series of supply-side shocks in the early years of the decade, including the disruptions resulting from the bottlenecks flowing from the COVID-19 pandemic and the 2022 Russian Invasion of Ukraine, which sparked an energy crisis and a food crisis. As the shockwaves resulting from the Ukraine conflict began to fade, the 2026 Iran War introduced a second front of supply stress, largely driven by the Hormuz energy crisis.

Strong economic growth in emerging markets, particularly India, increasingly supported demand for commodities as the decade progressed. South Asia captured a growing share of global GDP during the 2020s. India's population surpassed that of China in the early years of the decade and recorded economic growth of nearly 50% between 2020 and 2025.

The previous commodity super cycle was the 2000s commodities boom, which was widely attributed to strong growth in emerging markets, especially that of China, providing a high demand for raw materials.

== Early‑2020s commodity supply disruptions ==
The 2010s were characterised by languid commodity prices as the China boom of the previous decade unwound, however the dawning of the new decade would be almost immediately marked by violent price upheaval, with the rapidly spreading COVID‑19 epidemic triggering the first shock of the decade that would upend commodity markets across the globe.

Commodity prices lurched sharply in the early 2020s, initially in response to the COVID‑19 pandemic and the substantive dislocations it caused across global markets. The subsequent Russian invasion of Ukraine, however, introduced a second destabilising shock just as the effects of the pandemic were beginning to recede.

The COVID-19 recession initially made commodity prices drop, but lockdowns, supply chain bottlenecks, and dovish monetary policy limited supply and created excess demand leading to a surge in the price of numerous commodities.

The Russian invasion of Ukraine beginning in February 2022 worsened the bottlenecks, creating the 2022–2023 Russia–European Union gas dispute and the 2021 United Kingdom natural gas supplier crisis, contributing to the global energy crisis (2021–2023). As Russia and Belarus are major fertilizer exporters and natural gas is a primary component in many fertilizers, fertilizer prices rose accordingly, exacerbating the 2022–2023 global food crises.

== Food ==
Global food shortages already existed due to the COVID-19 pandemic when, during the 2022 Russian invasion of Ukraine, Russia blockaded the Port of Odesa, preventing grain exports. Ukraine is known as the breadbasket of Eastern Europe because of its fertile soil and exports of wheat, corn, and sunflower oil.

Turkey and the United Nations brokered the Black Sea Grain Initiative between Russia and Ukraine, allowing the controlled export of grain through the Port to the Black Sea, though shipments have yet to reach prewar levels.

Natural gas is in most fertilizers, and fertilizer prices rose due to the Russia–European Union gas dispute, contributing to the food crises.

=== Oats ===
Hectares of oats are down in North America along with droughts in the United States is limiting supply. Demand is up around the world for oats and 38.5% in one year for East Asia.

=== Orange juice ===
Orange juice prices began to climb in 2022, subsequently soaring to all-time highs in 2024, in part spurred by the impacts of Hurricanes Ian and Nicole, as well as Citrus greening disease which had been causing damage to citrus trees in the United States since 1998 when it was discovered, dropping orange production by half.

=== Eggs ===
Bird flu outbreaks 2020–2023 H5N8 outbreak and the 2020–2025 H5N1 outbreak has affected the number of egg laying hens and output.

=== Rice ===
India put an export ban on white rice in July 2023, and placed an export tax on parboiled rice exports in August 2023. India is the largest exporter of rice and other counties that export a lot of rice their export prices climbed along with India. Sub-Saharan Africa is expected to feel the biggest impact from the export control measures.

=== Cocoa ===
West Africa, a top producing region of cocoa was hit by strong Harmattan winds that lead to drier climates. The region produces 3/4 of all cocoa beans.

== Lumber ==
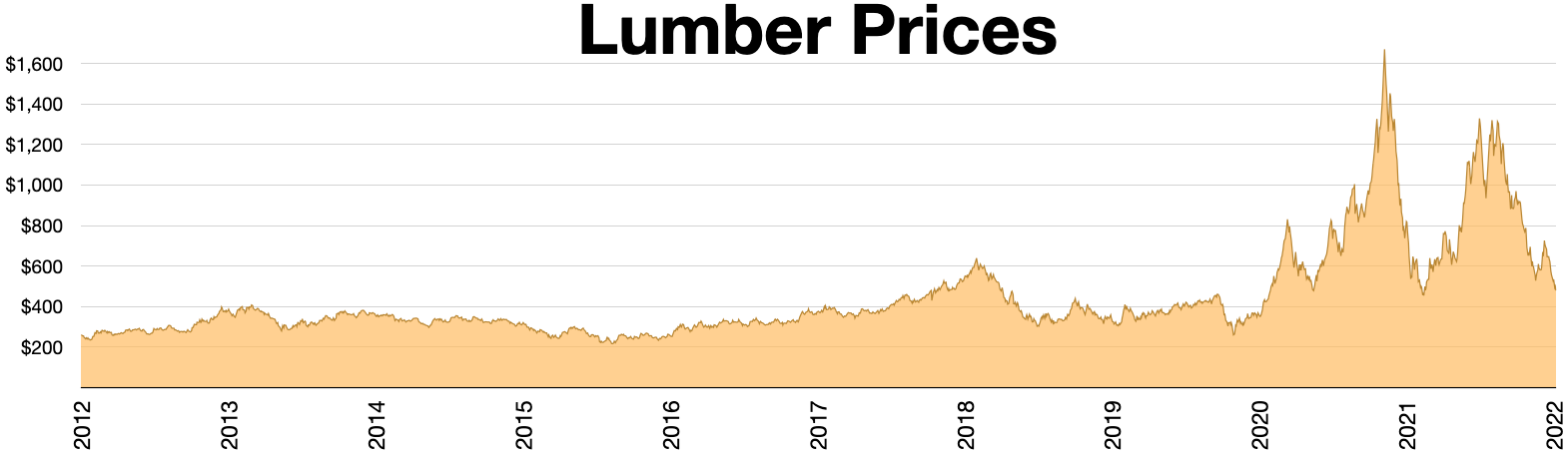
Lumber prices

Lumber prices increased with the hot housing market. Potential new American tariffs of 17.99% on Canadian lumber also sent the price higher. Those tariffs were finalized lower to 11.64% by the Biden administration. New contracts that allow semi trucks to haul contracts instead of just rail cars starting August 8, 2022, potentially contributing to normalization of prices in the second half of 2022. Mortgage interest rates rising with inflation is another reason for cooling housing demand and consequently lumber as well.

== Natural gas ==
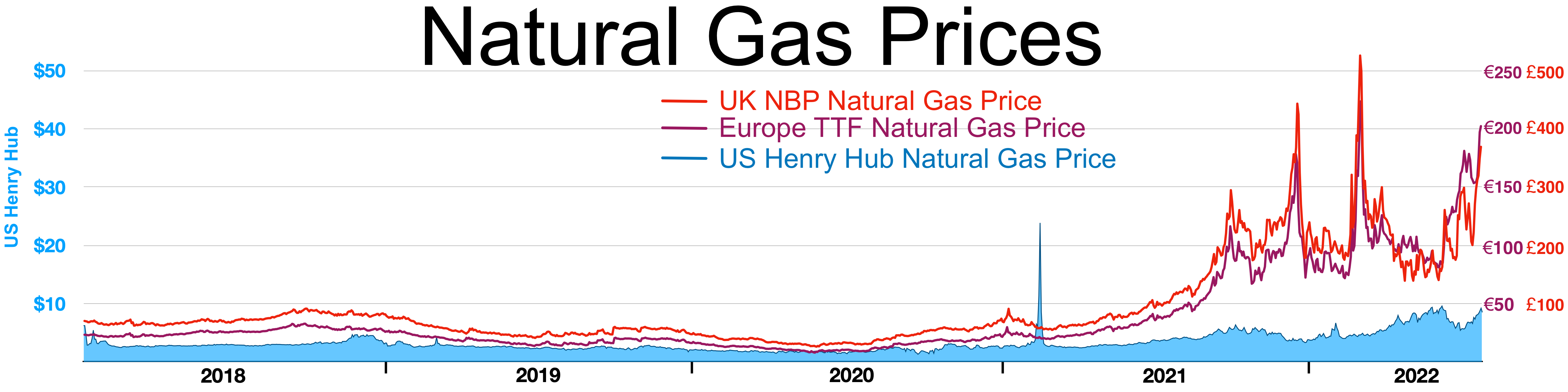
Natural gas prices in Europe and United States National Balancing Point NBP (UK) natural gas prices Europe TTF natural gas prices United States Henry Hub natural gas prices

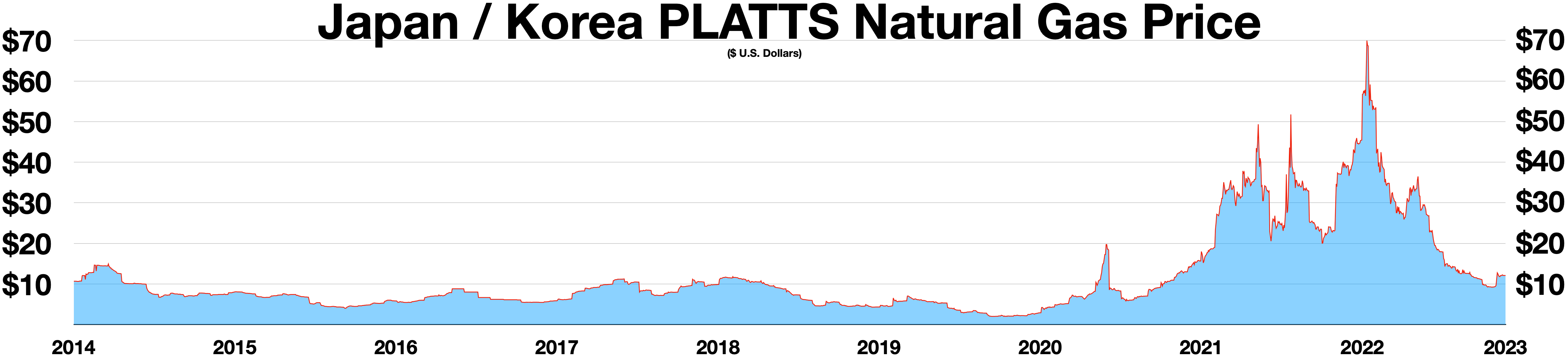
Japan / Korea PLATTS LNG price

Natural gas prices have increased around the world. In Europe, Russia invaded Ukraine, impacting the continent's dependence on Russia for natural gas via pipelines. Russia has economically weaponized natural gas and reduced flows on pipelines like the Nord Stream 1. Natural gas prices had been increasing worldwide before the invasion of Ukraine and increased substantially thereafter; in some areas, the price of gas has increased more than tenfold.

Natural gas recently became more of a global market with liquefied natural gas and LNG ships maturing in size with Qatar being a world leader in exporting LNG. This globalization of this fungible commodity has caused the prices to shadow each other more in different markets. Previously, natural gas was more difficult to ship, and required pipeline infrastructure, which generally can only be emplaced on land, or for relatively short distances undersea. With the increased use of LNG, gas can be shipped by sea, albeit with the requirement of specialized port facilities.

=== Piped natural gas ===
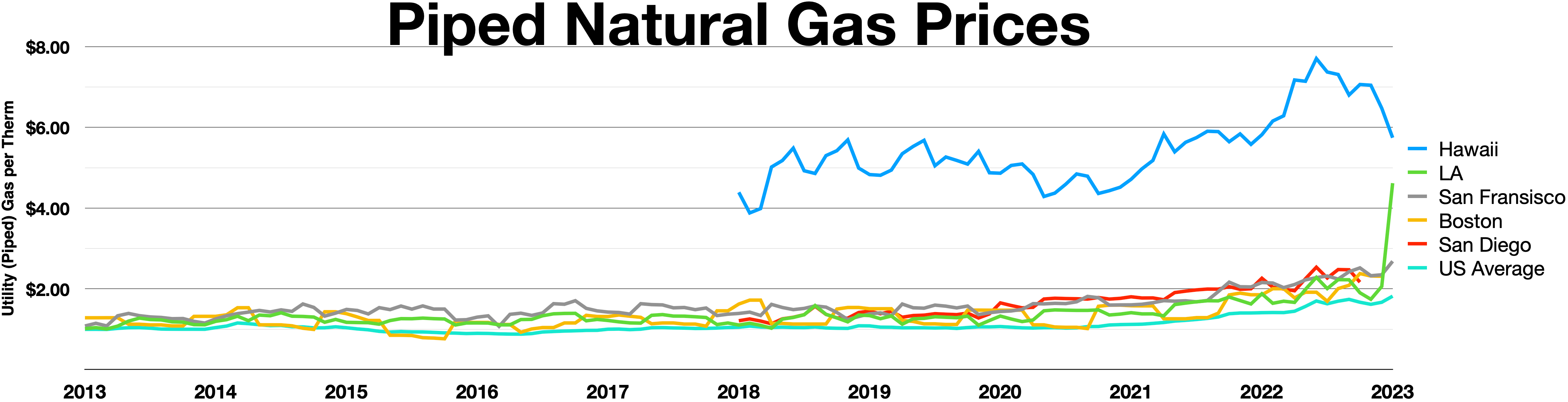
Piped natural gas prices Hawaii Los Angeles San Francisco Boston San Diego US average

Piped natural gas prices have been rising steadily throughout the U.S. since 2020 but California has experienced exceptionally higher prices because of bad weather, a pipe explosion on the El Paso Natural Gas pipeline, unscheduled maintenance, and the Aliso Canyon gas leak at the storage facility in the past, so it stores less now.

== Crude oil and petroleum products ==
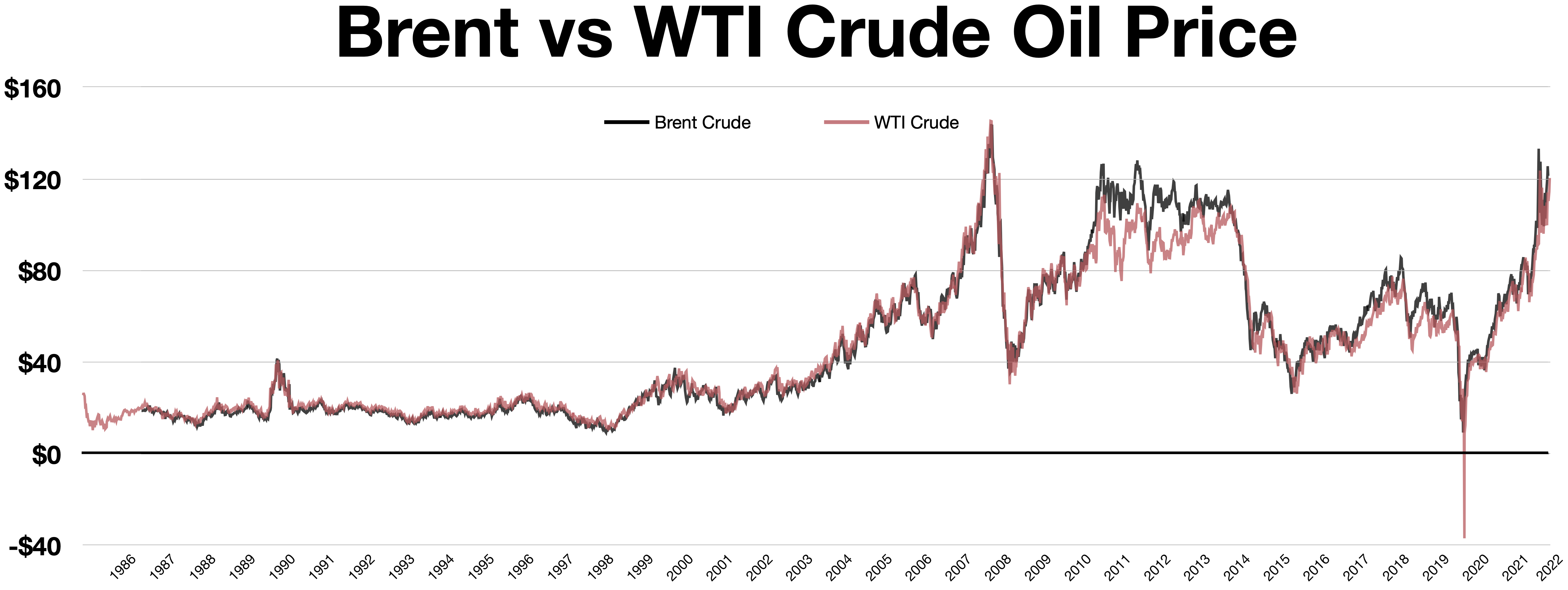
Brent Crude West Texas Intermediate

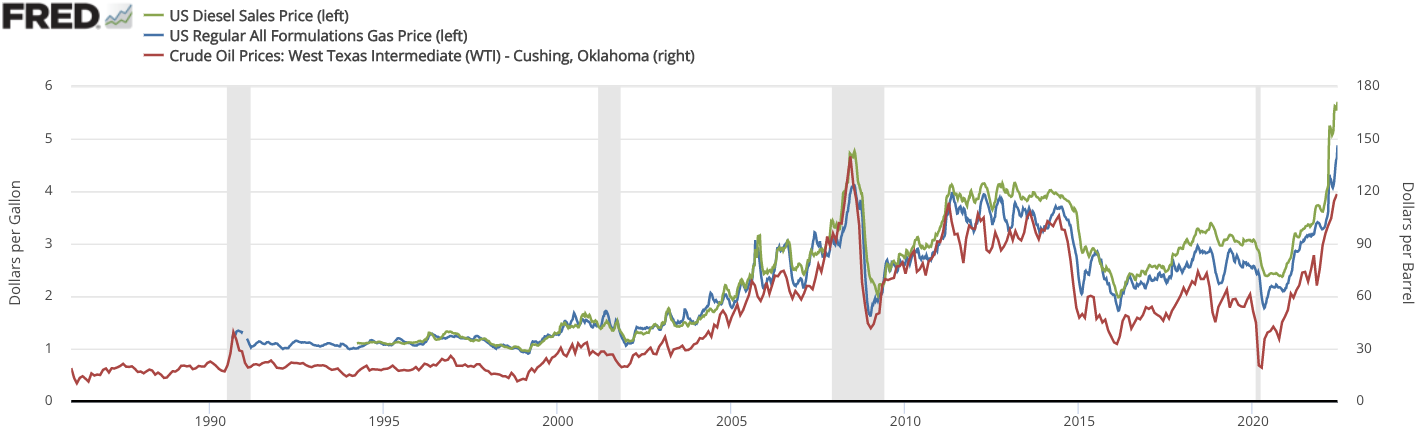
Diesel fuel (left) Gasoline (left) Crude oil price (WTI) (right)

Crude oil prices dropped dramatically during the first months of the COVID Pandemic (WTI went negative for a day) and production was cut in anticipation of a prolonged slowdown. Demand soon exceeded supply because of loose monetary policy causing a global energy crisis and prices to rise. Russia's invasion of Ukraine also resulted in price increases due to sanctions and trade restrictions.

=== Jet fuel ===
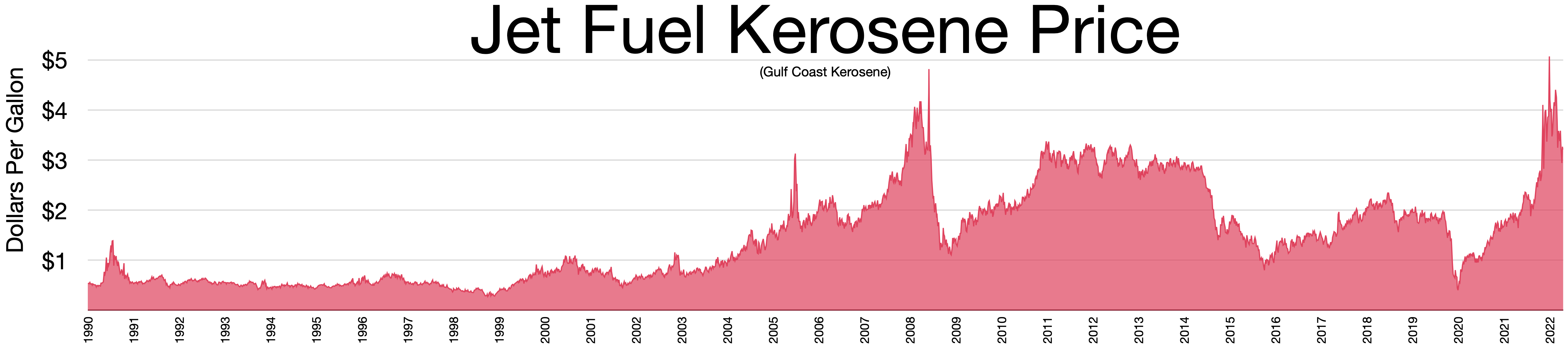
Jet fuel kerosene price

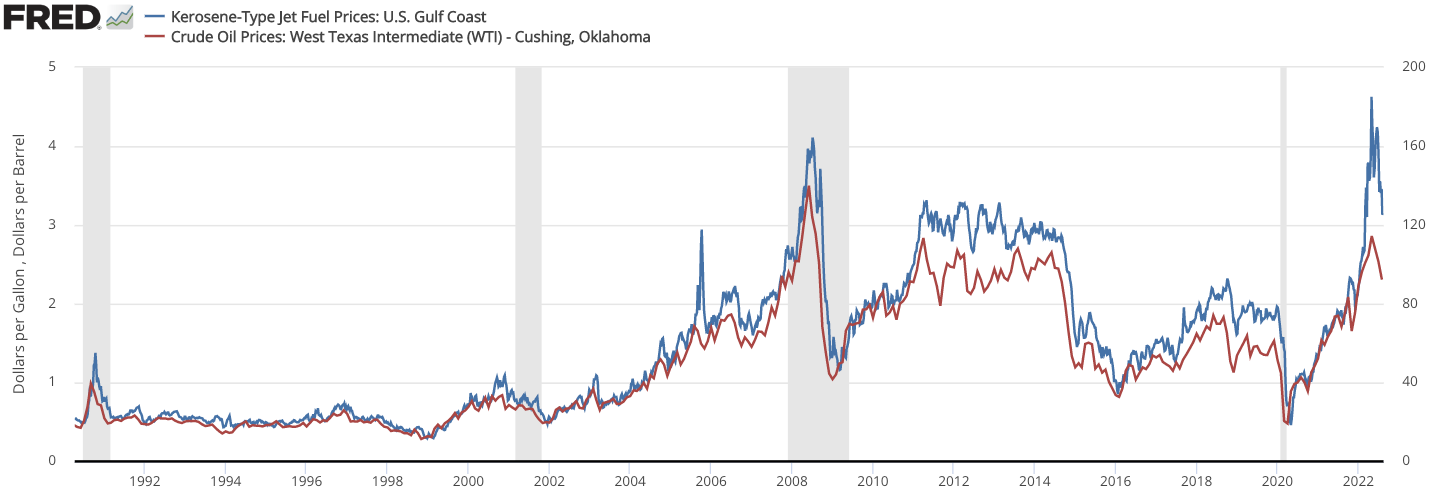
Jet fuel vs oil prices

Kerosene jet fuel refining has to compete with Diesel fuel and gasoline at the refineries when refining petroleum products. Jet fuel topped $5 a gallon in 2022.

=== Kerosene heating oil #1 ===
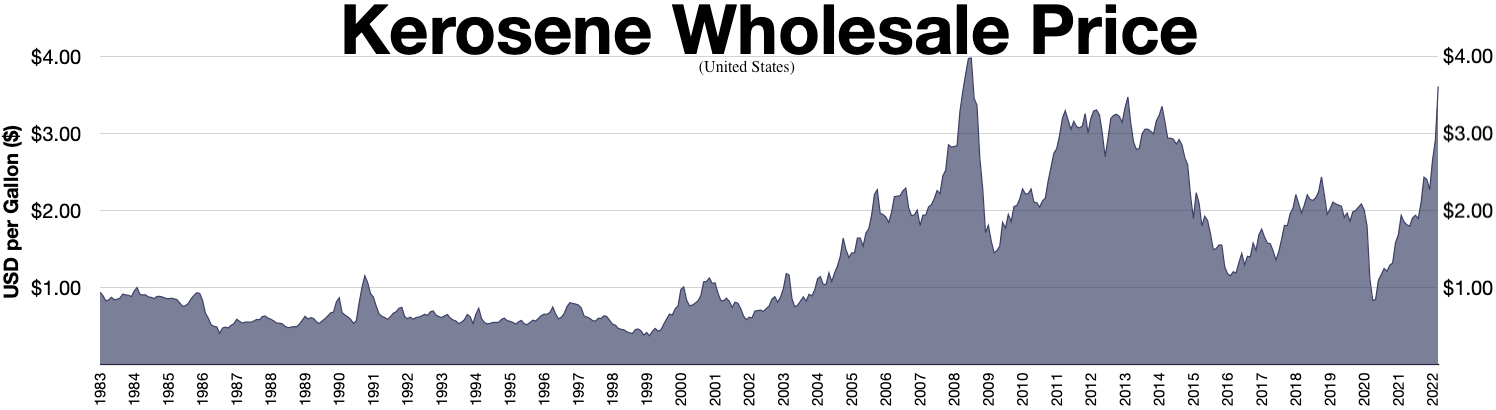
Kerosene #1 heating oil price

Kerosene heating oil was approaching $4 per gallon in March 2022. The EIA stopped reporting the data in March 2022.

=== Diesel heating oil #2 ===
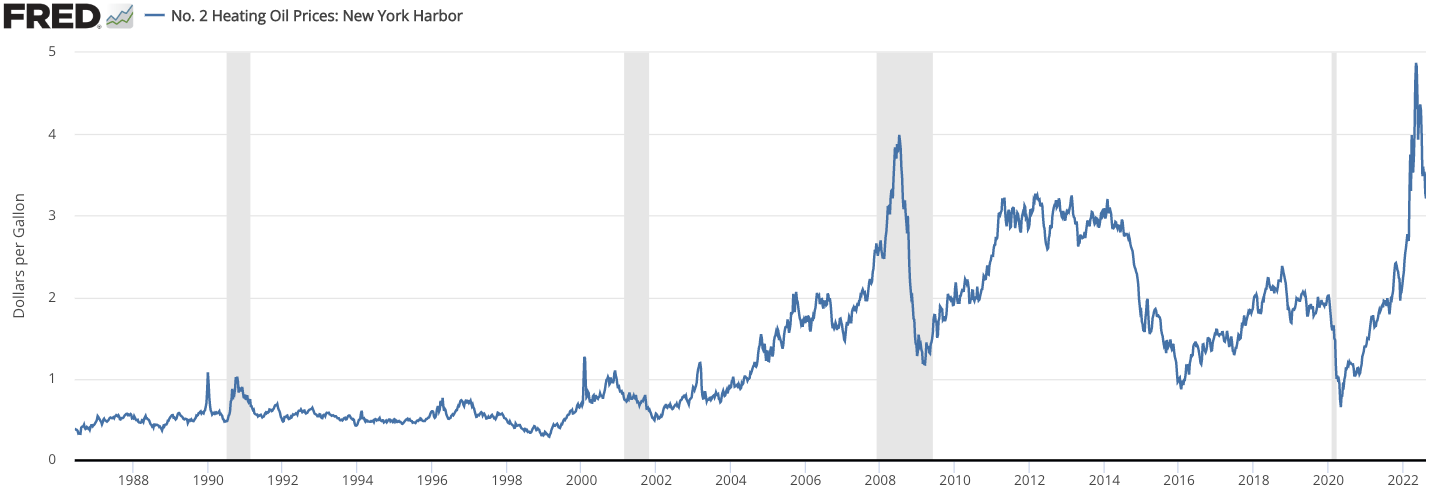
Diesel #2 heating oil price

Diesel heating oil went from around $2 before the pandemic to almost $5 a gallon in 2022. The prices have peaked and are falling in 2022.

=== RBOB gasoline ===
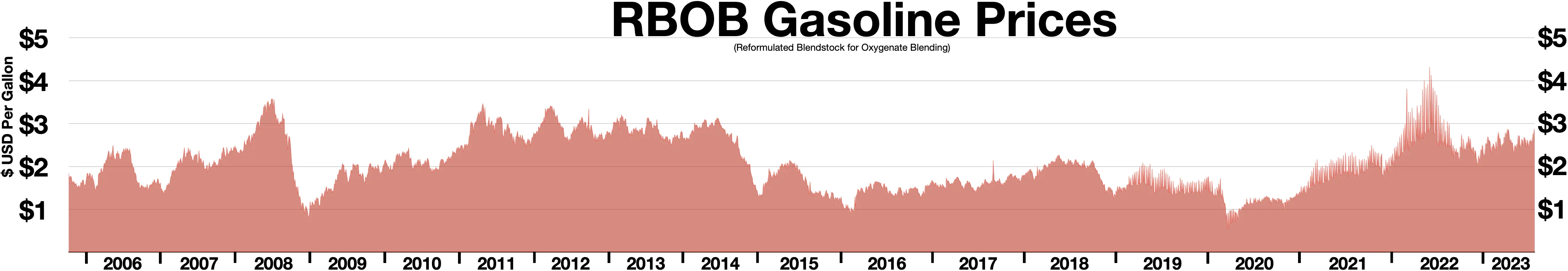
RBOB gasoline prices

RBOB stands for Reformulated Blendstock for Oxygenate Blending and is refined from crude oil and blended with 10% ethanol fuel. The price of RBOB closely follows the price of crude oil. RBOB plus the excise taxes on fuel reflect the price paid at the pump for gasoline.

== Electricity ==
Electricity prices rose in the United States through 2021 and 2022 mostly from the increase in natural gas prices which makes up the 35% of electricity generated in the United States.

== Lithium ==
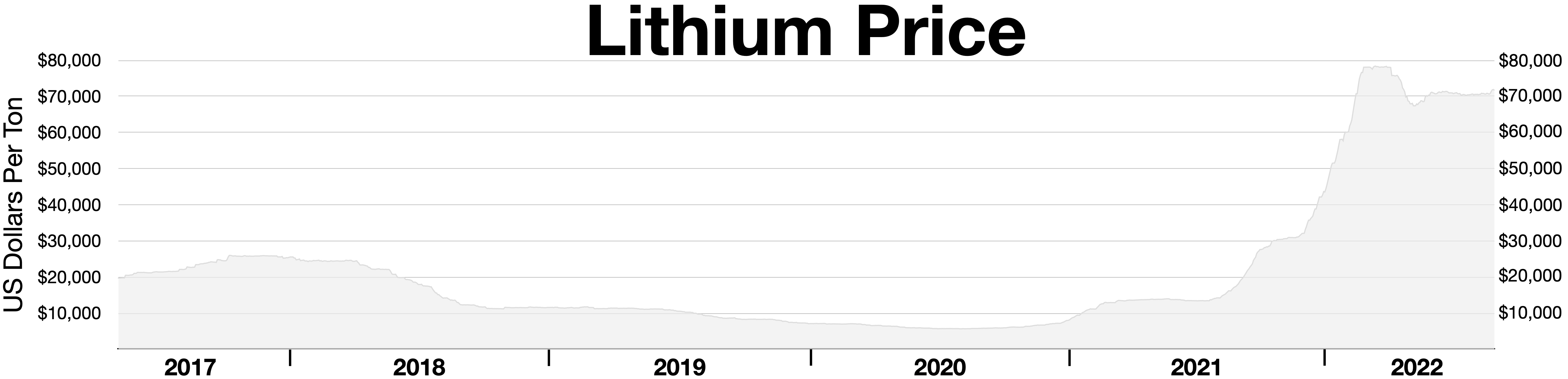
Lithium prices

The price of lithium carbonate started to rise in 2021 after slumping in 2020 and peaked in early 2022 close to $80,000 per ton. Demand for electric vehicles around the world is the primary cause for the price rise. In 2021, electric vehicle sales doubled to 6.6 million from 2020.

Lithium prices spiked in August 2025 following news that the Chinese lithium mine Jianxiawo would close.

== Copper ==
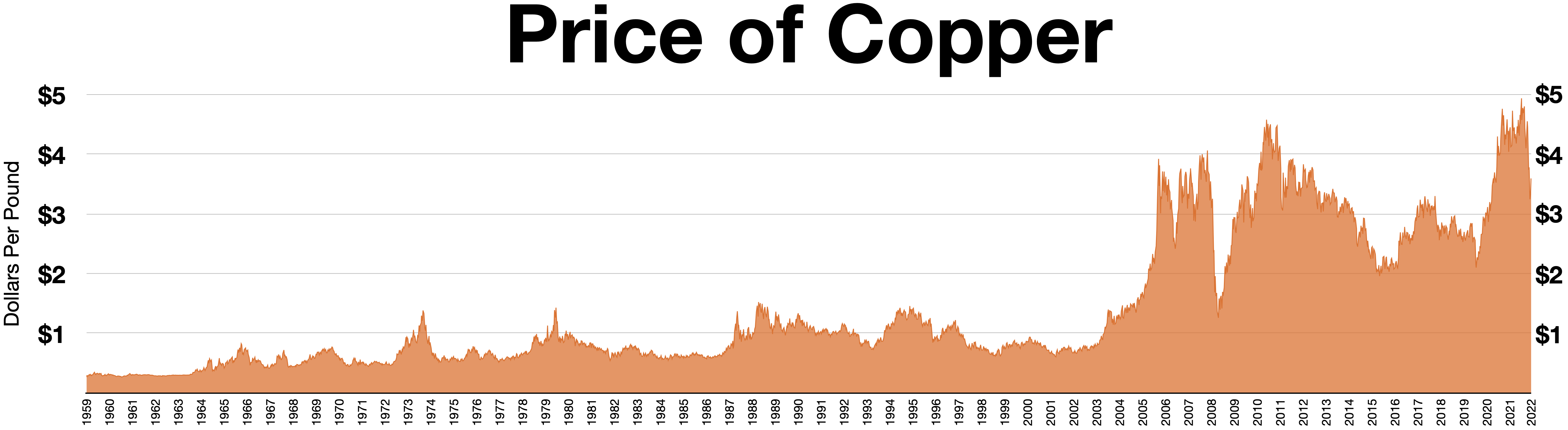
Price of copper

The price of copper rose through 2021 and peaked close to $5 per pound in Q2 2022 before retreating. Copper demand is expected to double from 25 million metric tonnes in 2022 to over 50 MMT by the year 2035.

In the Americas, Peru leads as of 2026 in new copper mining projects hosting 19 of the 67 (28.4%) major projects being developed on the continent. The Chilean Mining Council foresees stable levels of copper production in Chile as of 2026.

== Nickel ==
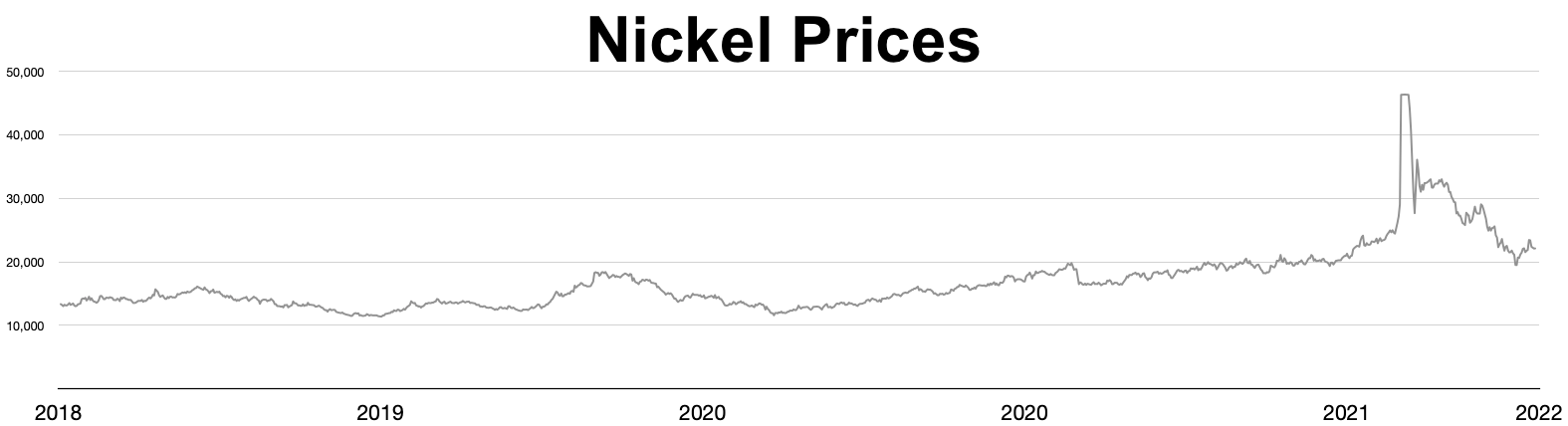
Nickel prices 2018–2022

In March 2022 nickel prices spiked higher over fear of the Russian invasion of Ukraine as Russia produced 15.2% of world nickel in 2021.

However, in 2024 the nickel price collapsed on the back of an Indonesian production surge, with output rising from 780,000 tons in 2020 to 2.3 million tons in 2024. Indonesia's share of global supply rose from 30% to 70% over the same period.

== Tin ==
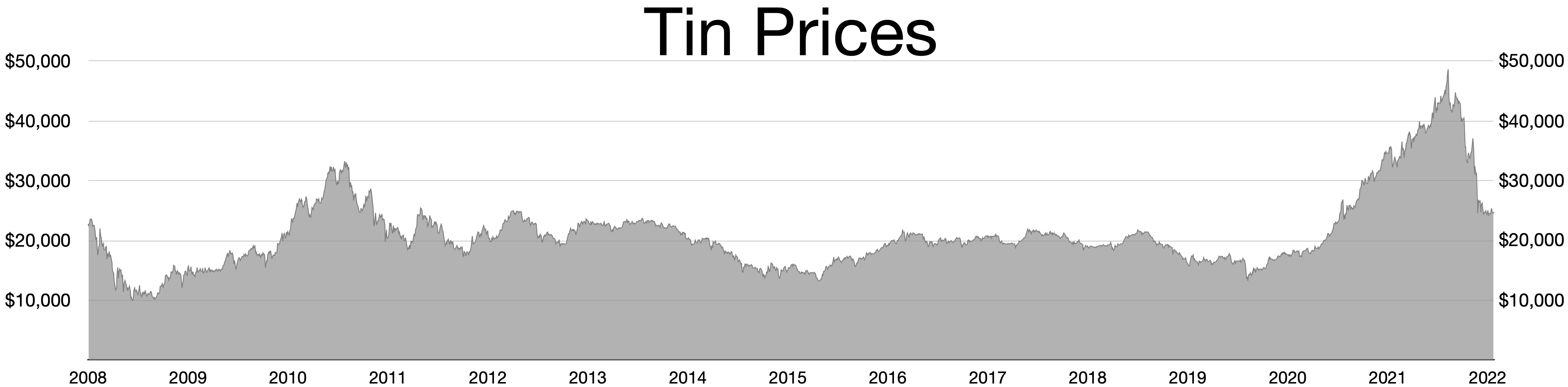
Tin prices 2008–2022

Prices of tin were up 79% in 2021 because of high demand for circuit boards.

== Titanium ==
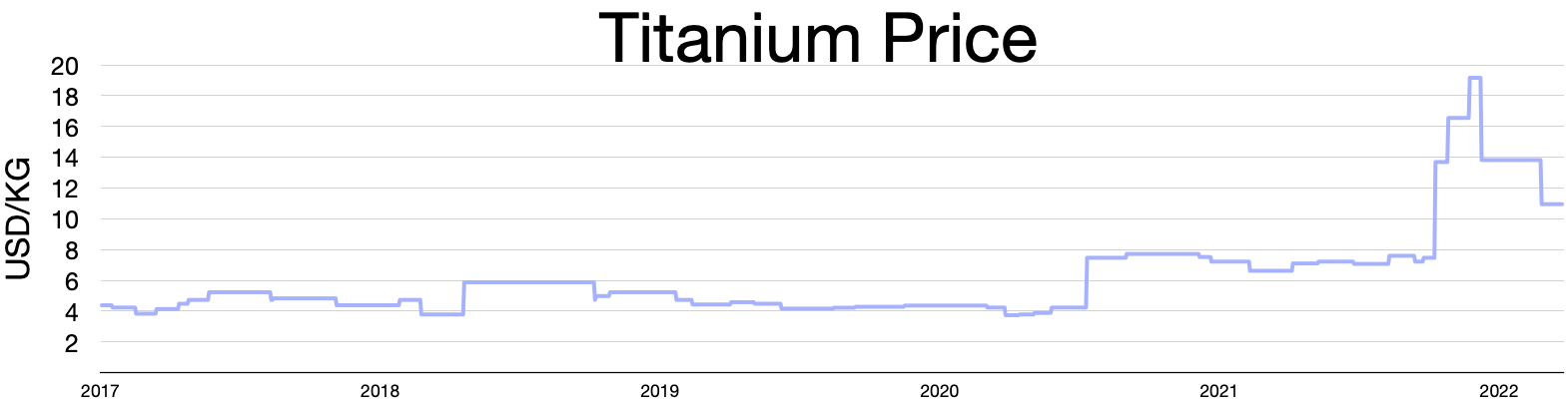
Titanium price

Demand for titanium is high because defense spending increases on and resulting from the Russo-Ukrainian War, parts for aircraft makers and defense contractors; additionally, automotive industry demand for titanium dioxide pigments remains high.

== Rolled steel ==
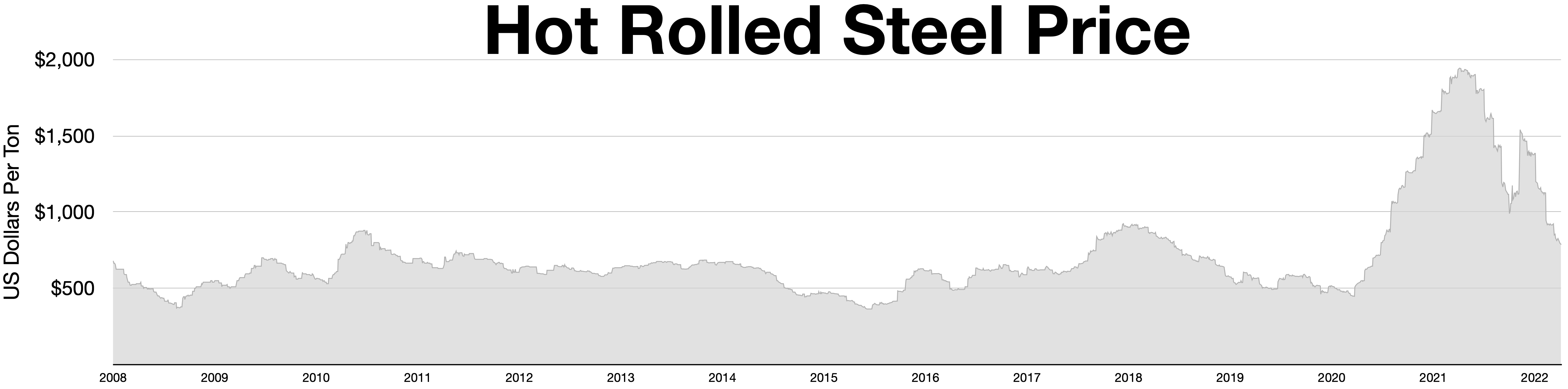
Rolled steel price

Hot-rolled steel prices hit close to $2,000 per ton in 2021.

== Palladium ==
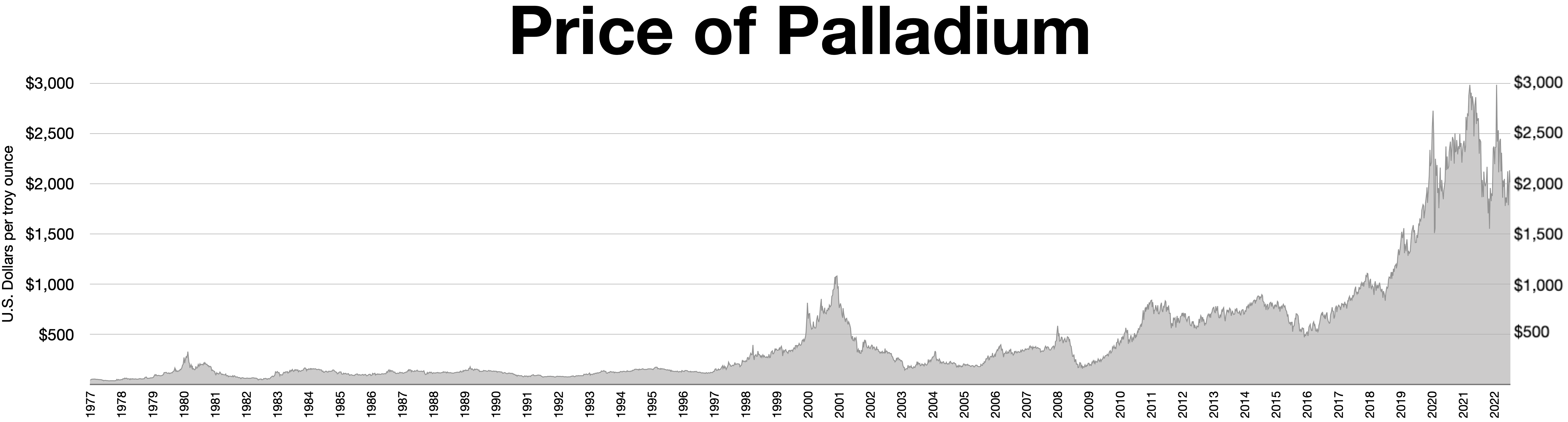
Palladium prices

Palladium is used widely in catalytic converters to curb harmful emissions from car exhaust. Russia produces 40% of all palladium in the world, and the Russian invasion of Ukraine has rattled the palladium market.

== Rhodium ==
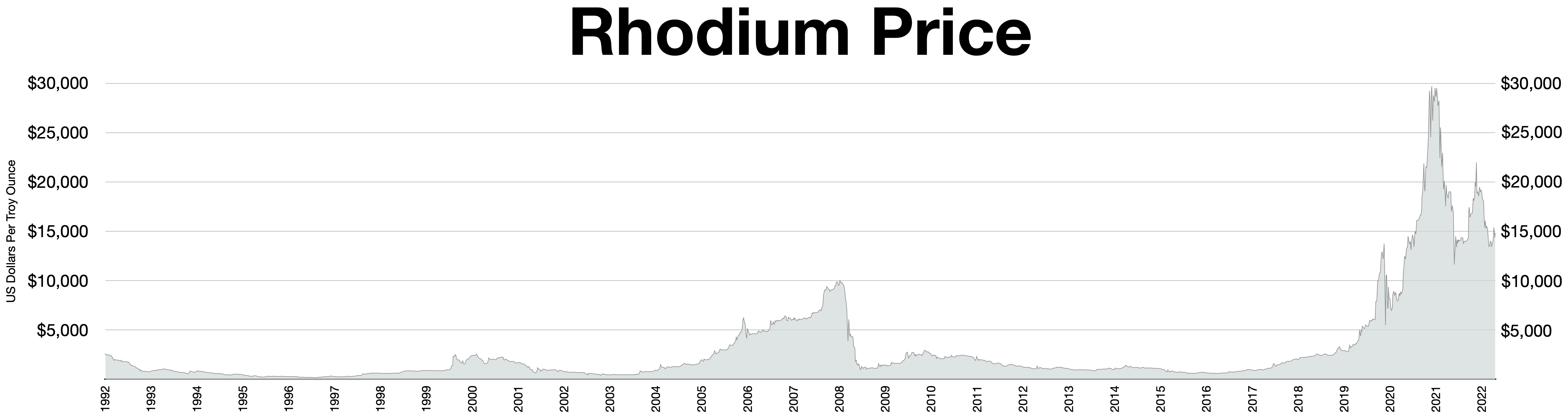
Rhodium daily price 1992–2022

Rhodium is used widely in automotive catalytic converters. Many countries have agreed to the Paris climate agreement to cut car emissions and have higher standards for exhaust.

South Africa produces 80–90% of Rhodium each year. Russia is the second largest producer of rhodium but it is around 1%. The COVID-19 pandemic in South Africa caused the country to enact lockdown restrictions in March 2020 and again in December 2020 – March 2021. This affected the supply of Rhodium causing the price to increase.

== Gold ==
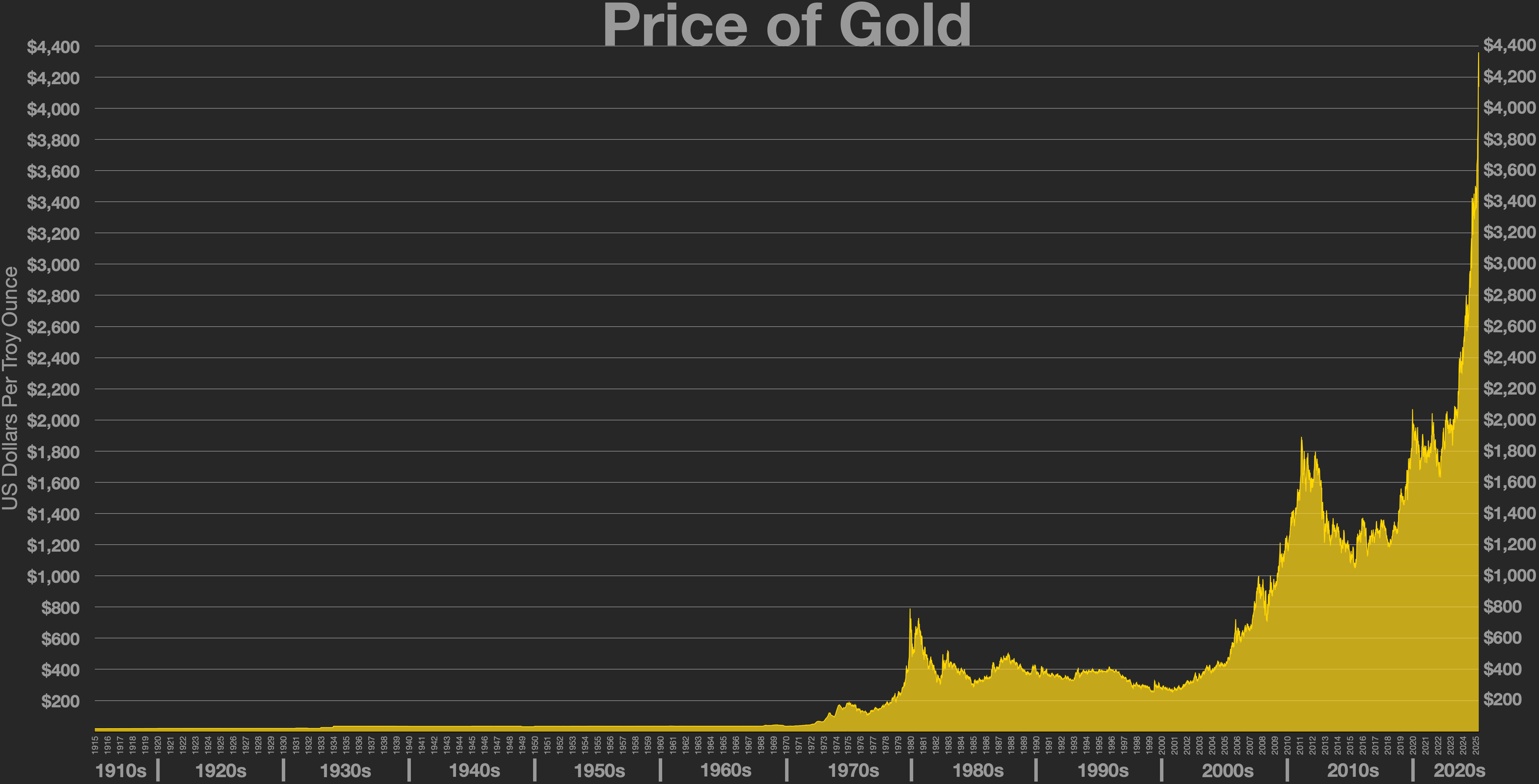
Price of gold 1915–2022

Gold started to increase in price at the start of the COVID-19 pandemic as stocks sunk initially; gold is commonly seen as a safe haven from inflation and stock volatility. Gold crossed the $2,000 mark for the first time in August 2020 and again in March 2022.

== Iron ore ==
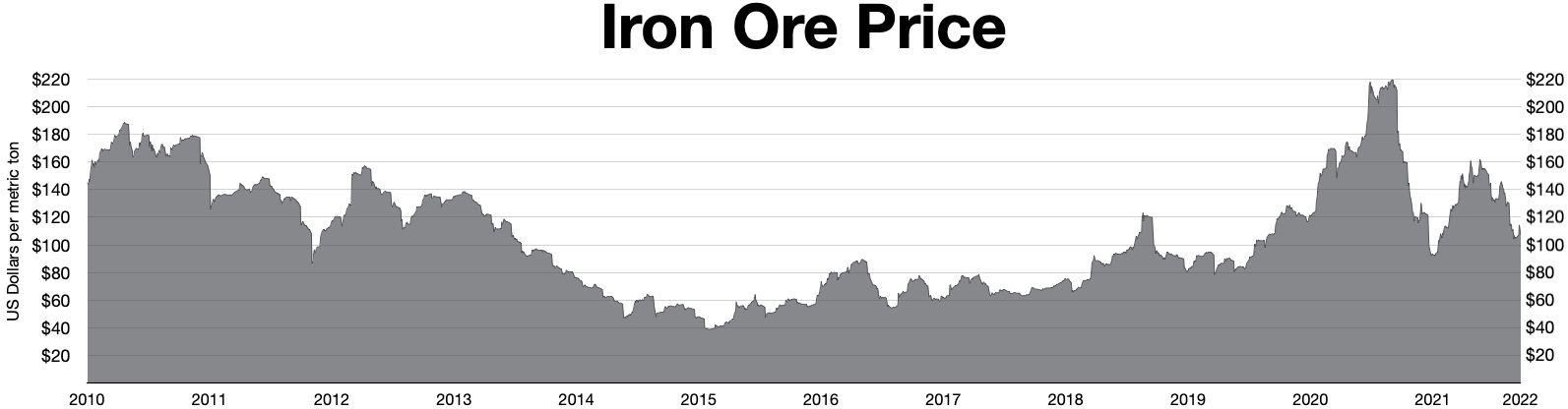
Iron ore price 2010–2022

China is the number one consumer of iron ore, importing 80% of all internationally traded iron ore. The price has been very volatile because of curbs the CCP has placed on the steel industry to meet emission standards. Australia, Brazil, and China are the top three producers of iron ore.

== Cotton ==
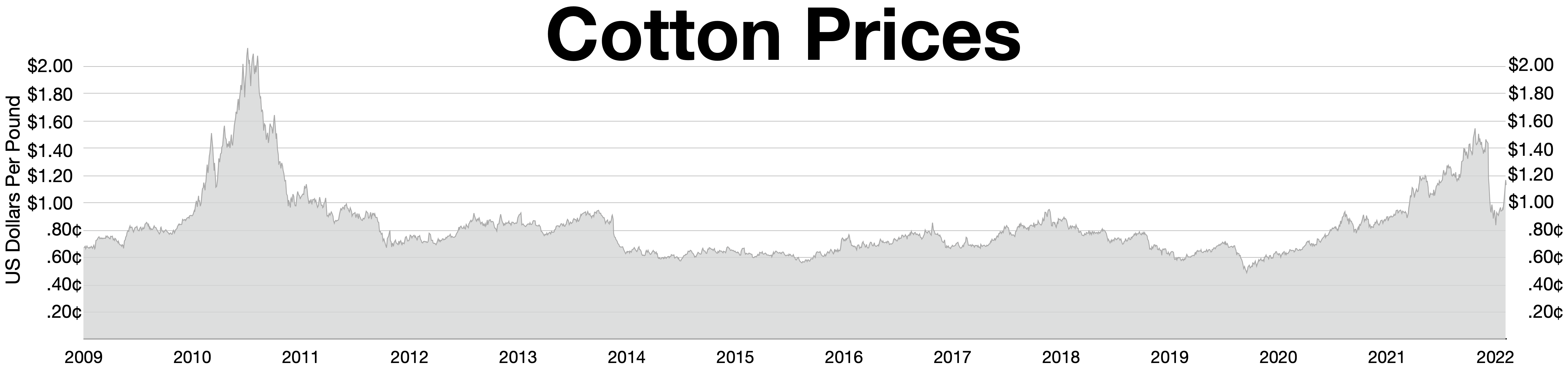
Cotton prices 2009–2022

In the Western United States there have been persistent droughts in the 2020s hurting cotton yields among other agricultural products.

== See also ==
- 1970s energy crisis
- 1970s commodities boom
- 2000s commodities boom
- 2021–2023 inflation surge
- 2025–present global memory supply shortage
- Commodity market
- Housing shortage
- List of commodity booms
