= PEG Nord (France) =

The Gas exchange point - North (Point d'échange de gaz – Nord), commonly referred to as PEG Nord, is one of 3 virtual trading locations for the sale, purchase and exchange of natural gas and LNG in France. It is one of the pricing and delivery points for Powernext natural gas futures contracts. It is the sixth most liquid gas trading point in Europe. Gas at the PEG Nord is traded on the Powernext exchange.

== History ==
PEG Nord is one of the 3 current Virtual trading point (or trading hubs) and balancing areas for Gas in France and was created in 2004 and rationalised in 2009.

== Ownership ==
PEG Nord belongs to GDF Suez via its subsidiary GRTgaz.

== Interconnections ==
PEG Nord is connected to:

- PEG Sud (France)
- Zeebrugge Hub
- NetConnect Germany
- Fluxswiss
- Gassco

In addition it has a LNG terminal at Montoir.
