= Virtual trading point =

Non-physical hub for trading natural gas

A virtual trading point is a non-physical hub for trading in natural gas markets, for which "there is a virtual trading point (VTP) for each market area, representing all entry and exit points in that market area."

== Examples ==
- National Balancing Point (UK)
- Title Transfer Facility (Netherlands)
- Zeebrugge Hub (Belgium)
- PEG Nord (France)
- PEG Sud (France) before April 1, 2015
- PEG TIGF (France) before April 1, 2015
- TRS (France) since April 1, 2015
- MS-ATR (Spain)
- Punto di Scambio Virtuale (Italy)
- Gaspool (Germany)
- NetConnect Germany (Germany)
- Central European Gas Hub (Austria)

== See also ==
- Henry Hub (USA)
- Glossary of terms used in the trading of oil and gas, utilities and mining commodities
