= Humanitarian impact of the Russo-Ukrainian war =

Humanitarian impact of the Russo-Ukrainian war may refer to:

- Humanitarian situation during the war in Donbas
- Humanitarian impacts of the Russo-Ukrainian war (2022–present)
