= PEG Sud (France) =

The Gas exchange point - South (Point d'échange de gaz – Sud), commonly referred to as PEG Sud, was one of 3 virtual trading locations for the sale, purchase and exchange of natural gas and LNG in France. It was one of the pricing and delivery points for Powernext natural gas futures contracts. Gas at the PEG Nord is traded on the Powernext exchange. On April 1, 2015, it was merged with PEG TIGF (France) into the TRS (Trading Region South).

== History ==
PEG Sud was one of the 3 virtual trading points (VTPs or trading hubs) and balancing areas for gas in France and was created in 2004 and rationalised in 2009. It covered the southern half of France except the south west region which was covered by PEG TIGF.

== Ownership ==
PEG Sud belonged to GDF Suez via its subsidiary GRTgaz.

== Interconnections ==
PEG Sud was connected to:

- PEG Nord (France)
- PEG TIGF (France)
