= Gas price =

Gas price may refer to:

- Gasoline and diesel usage and pricing
- Natural gas prices
