= Qatar–Ukraine relations =

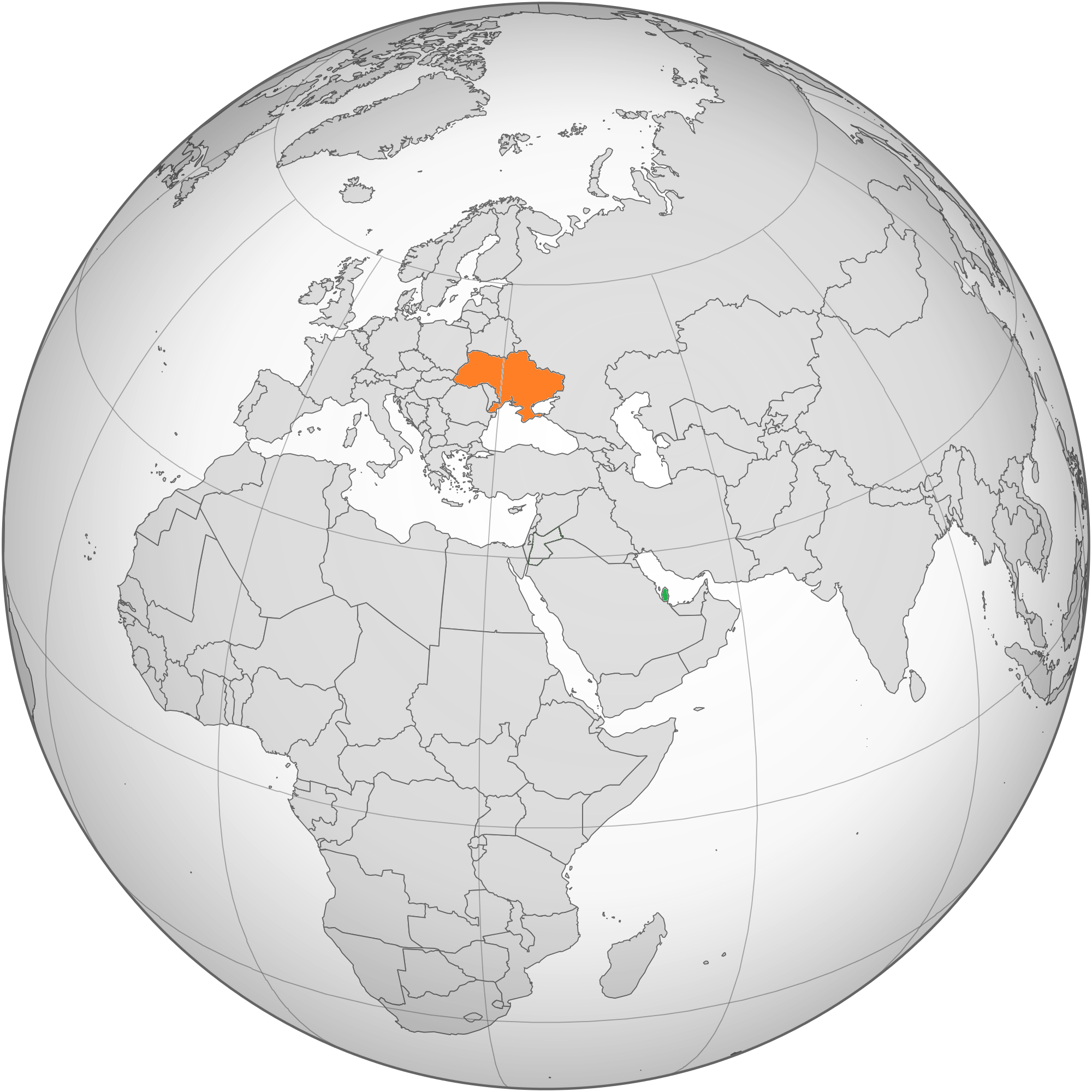

- Qatar: Ukraine

Diplomatic mission
- Embassy of Qatar, Kyiv: Embassy of Ukraine, Doha

Qatar–Ukraine relations refer to bilateral relations between Qatar and Ukraine. Ukraine has an embassy in Doha since November 2012, and Qatar has an embassy in Kyiv since September 2013.

== History ==
Both countries first established diplomatic relations on 13 April 1993, but had little political contact in the early years. The first diplomatic visit was from the Ukrainian foreign minister, who visited Doha in January 2002.

In 2020, amidst the COVID-19 pandemic, Qatar assisted Ukraine as part of its delivery of humanitarian medical aid to 60 countries.

Since the Russo-Ukrainian war, Qatar actively assisted Ukraine regarding the humanitarian impact of the war, such as mediating prisoner exchanges during the conflict and helping facilitate the return of abducted Ukrainian children.

On 28 March 2026, as a result of Iranian strikes on Qatar during the 2026 Iran war, Ukrainian and Qatari representatives signed a 10-year defense agreement aimed at increasing security cooperation, including on technology, expertise, and investment.

== See also ==
- Foreign relations of Qatar
- Foreign relations of Ukraine
