= VTP (disambiguation) =

VTP (VLAN Trunking Protocol) is a proprietary Layer 2 messaging protocol.

VTP may also refer to:

- Venturi Transport Protocol, a proprietary transport layer protocol
- Virtual trading point, a non-physical hub for trading in natural gas markets
- Votran Transfer Plaza, Volusia County, Florida
- Progress of the Fatherland Party (Vatan Taraqqiyoti Partiyasi), a political party in Uzbekistan
