= Baudouin Canal =

Canal in Belgium

Coordinates: 51.236803°N 3.220958°E

Baudouin
- The Baudouin Canal connects Bruges to Zeebrugge.

Specifications
- Length: 7.5 miles (12.1 km)

History
- Construction began: 1896
- Date of first use: 1907

Geography
- Start point: Zeebrugge
- End point: Bruges

The Baudouin Canal (Dutch: Boudewijnkanaal; French: Canal Baudouin) is a canal located in western Belgium, which was named for King Baudouin of Belgium. The Baudouin Canal connects Zeebrugge with Bruges (Dutch: Brugge). Its total length is 7.5 kilometres (4.7 mi) and has a depth of 8 metres (26 ft) and a width of 125 metres (410 ft).

== History ==
Originally medieval Bruges was connected to the sea by the Zwin tidal channel. The Zwin gradually silted up. The Baudouin Canal was constructed between 1896 and 1907 to provide Bruges with maritime access.
