= Delivery point (futures trading) =

In a futures contract where the underlying is a physical object, such as grain or oil, the price of the futures contract is quoted assuming delivery of that physical object to a specific physical location in the world. For instance, natural gas futures in the United States usually have the Henry Hub as a delivery point, and gold may have a delivery point of New York or London. Futures contracts that differ only in the delivery point will typically have slightly different prices, reflecting localized supply and demand and transportation costs.

West Texas Intermediate crude oil has a delivery point to Cushing, Oklahoma.
