= Zeebrugge =

Village of the city of Bruges, Belgium

- Village
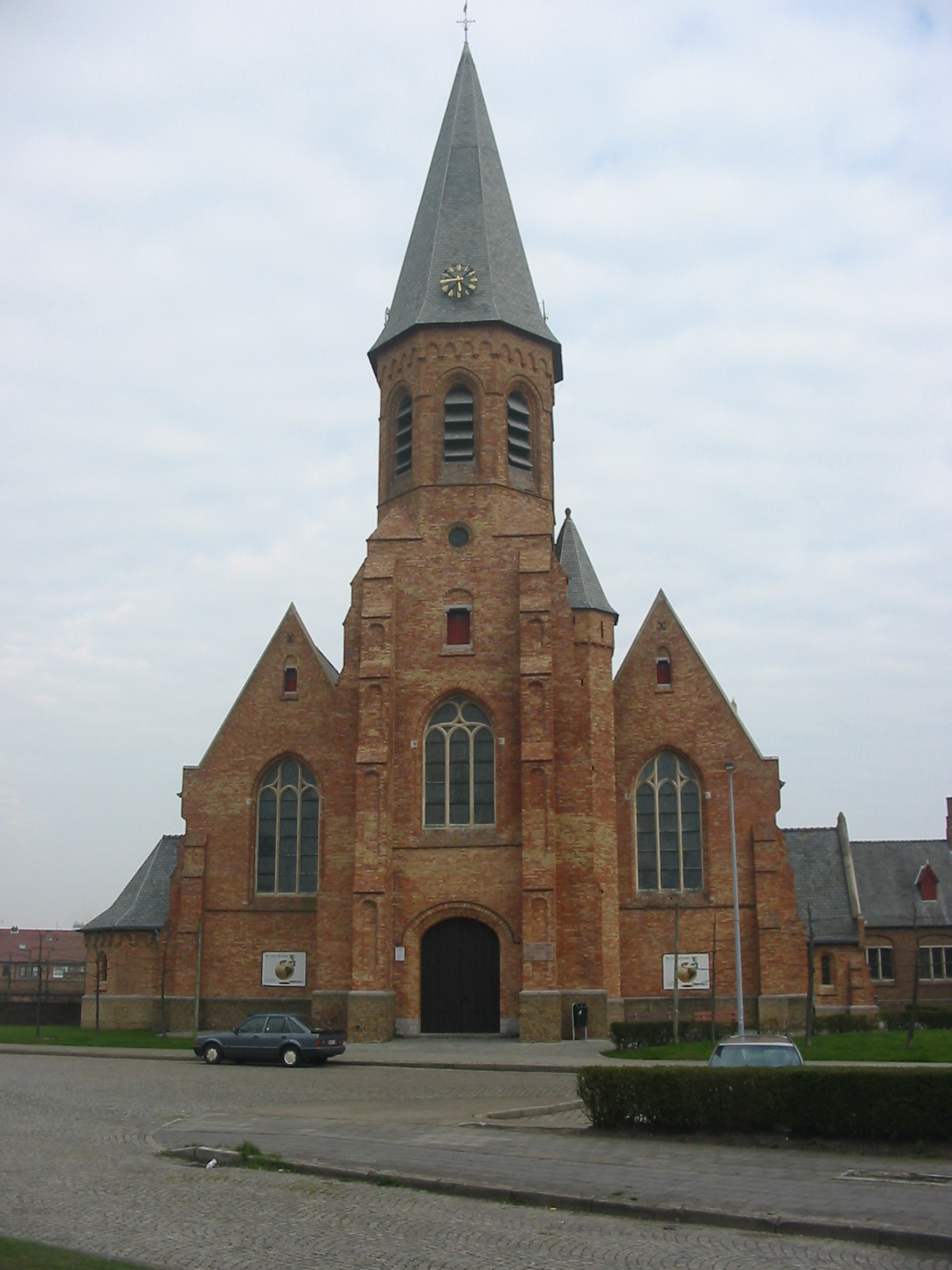
- The church of Zeebrugge
- Interactive map of Zeebrugge
- Location within Belgium Location within West Flanders
- Coordinates: 51°19′49″N 3°12′23″E
- Country: Belgium
- Community: Flemish Community
- Region: Flemish Region
- Province: West Flanders
- Arrondissement: Bruges
- Municipality: Bruges

Population (2014-12-31)
  - Total: 4,301
- Postal codes: 8380
- Area codes: 050

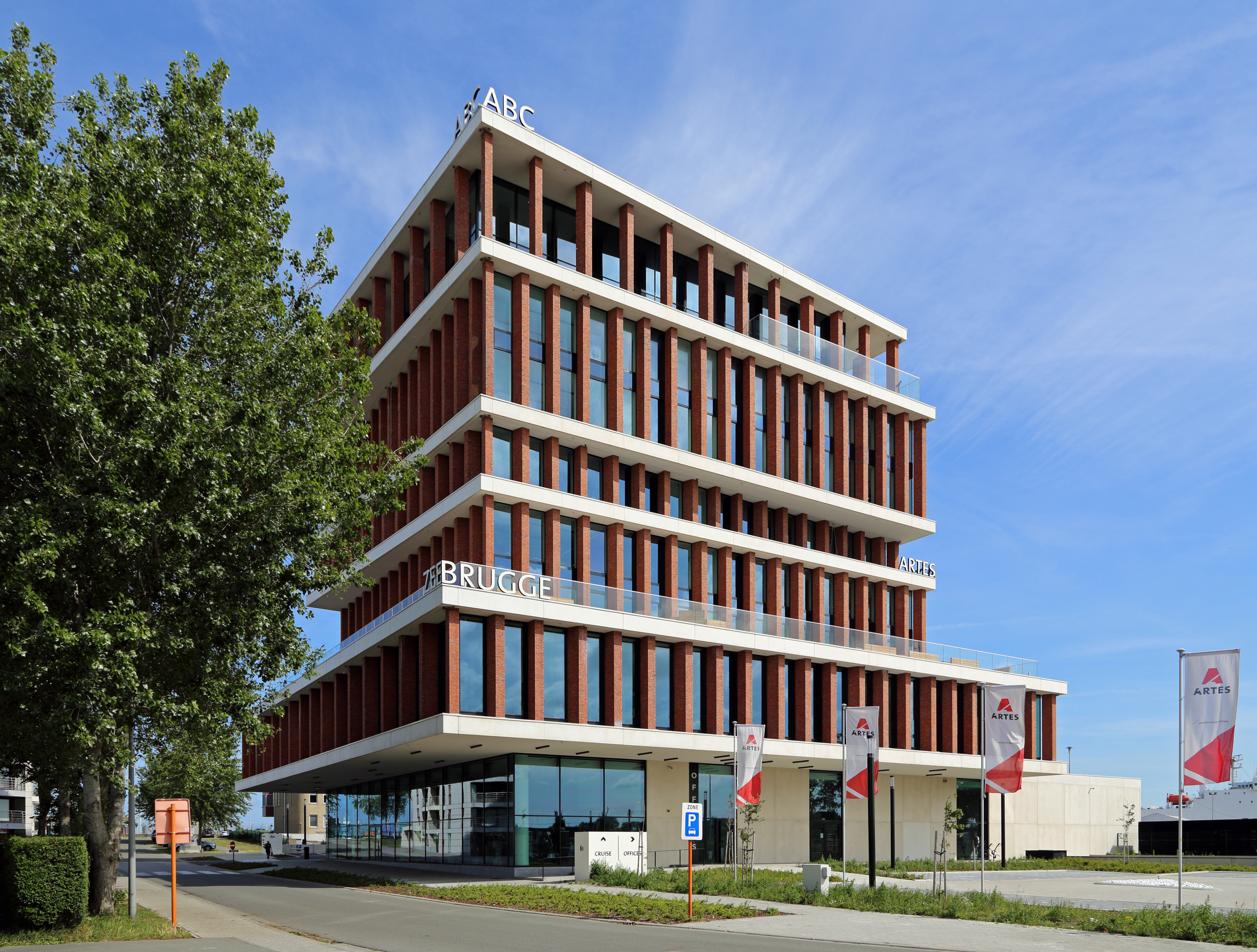
The cruise terminal

Zeebrugge (Dutch pronunciation: [zeːˈbrʏɣə]; from Brugge aan zee [ˌbrʏɣə ʔaːn ˈzeː], meaning "Bruges-on-Sea"; French: Zeebruges, pronounced [zebʁyʒ]) is a village on the coast of Belgium and a subdivision of Bruges, for which it is the modern port. Zeebrugge serves as both the international port of Bruges-Zeebrugge and a seafront resort with hotels, cafés, a marina and a beach.

== Location ==
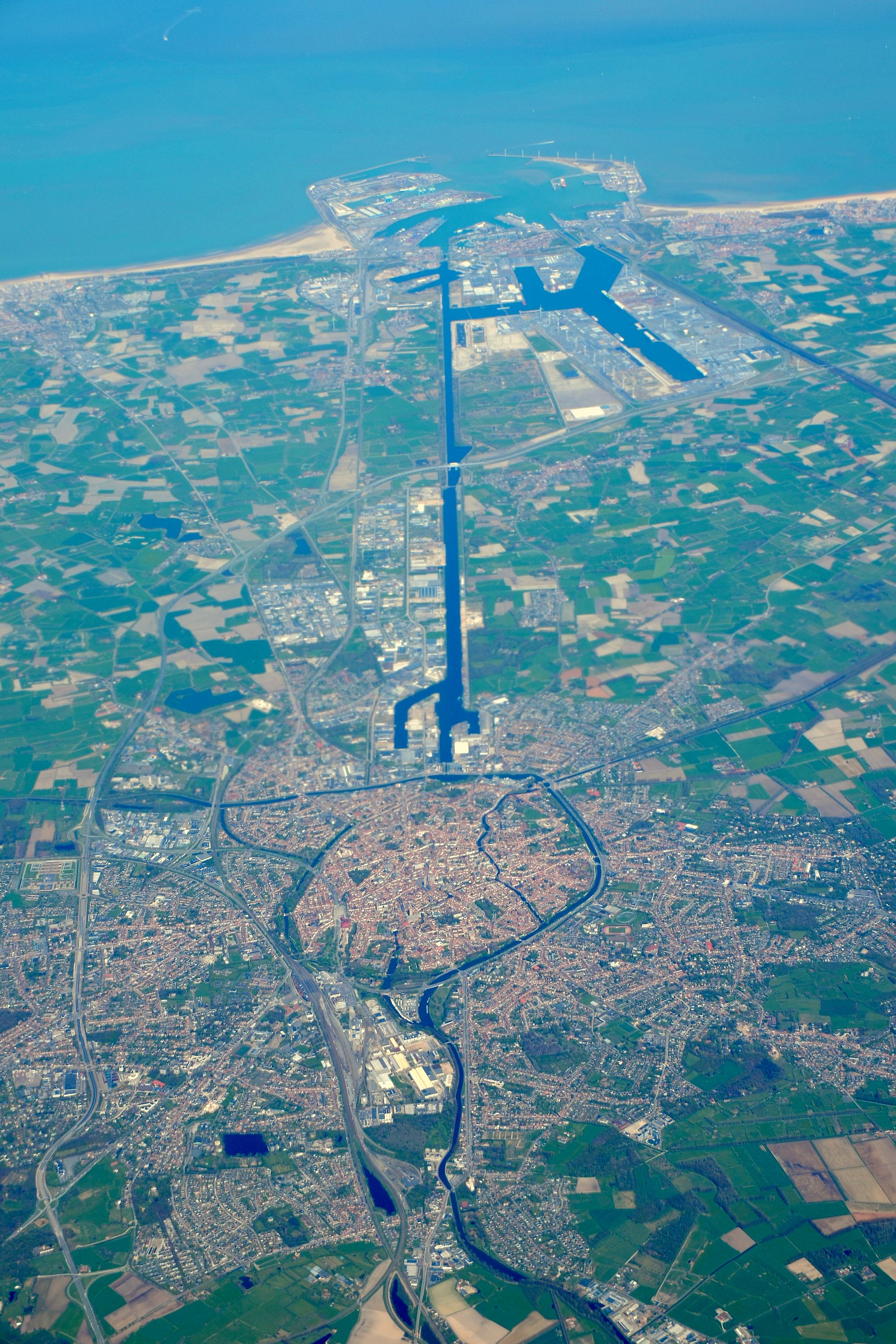
Aerial view of the Boudewijnkanaal canal linking Zeebrugge (top) with Bruges (middle)

Zeebrugge is located on the coast of the North Sea. Its central location on the Belgian coast, short distance to Great Britain and close vicinity to densely populated industrialised cities make it a crossroads for traffic from all directions. An expressway to Bruges connects Zeebrugge to the European motorway system; one can also get to and from Zeebrugge by train or tram. A 12-kilometre (7.5 mi) canal links the port to the centre of Bruges.

It is Belgium's most important fishing port and the wholesale fish market located there is one of the largest in Europe.

Aside from being a passenger terminal with ferries to the United Kingdom, the harbour serves as the central port for Europe's automotive industry, and it is important for the import, handling and storage of energy products, agriculture products and other general cargo. Zeebrugge has the largest LNG terminal complex in Europe.

== History ==
=== 1918 Zeebrugge Raid ===
The harbour was the site of the Zeebrugge Raid on 23 April 1918, when the British Royal Navy temporarily put the German inland naval base at Bruges out of action. Admiral Roger Keyes planned and led the raid that stormed the German batteries and sank three old warships at the entrance to the canal leading to the inland port. This action was a partial success as it blocked the access, but the Germans dug a new canal around the ships. The raid, although a morale-boosting victory in Britain, was also claimed as a victory in Germany.

=== 1987 ferry disaster ===
Later, in 1987, Zeebrugge's harbour was the scene of disaster when the Herald of Free Enterprise passenger ferry capsized, moments after setting sail with her bow doors open, killing 193 people.

=== 2023 Storm Ciarán ===
In 2023, Zeebrugge was hit by the major European windstorm Storm Ciarán, reaching windspeeds up to 105 km/h (65 mph), becoming the maximum wind record for the country during the storm.

== Passenger ferry routes ==
- Former P&O Ferries service to Hull, United Kingdom
- a succession of former services to Rosyth, United Kingdom

== See also ==
- Zeebrugge Hub
