= Humanitarian impact of the Russo-Ukrainian war (2022–present) =

The 2022 Russian invasion of Ukraine and ensuing Russo-Ukrainian war has had a broad range of humanitarian impacts, both in Ukraine and internationally. These include the Ukrainian refugee crisis, the disruption of global food supplies, death and suffering of civilian population, widespread conscription in both Russia and Ukraine, severe effects on Ukrainian society and emigration of Russian population.

== Refugee crisis ==
The Ukrainian refugee crisis began with the Russian invasion of Ukraine in February 2022. As of September 2025, the UNHCR has recorded 5.7 million Ukrainian refugees around the world, with 90% of this figure residing in various European countries outside of Ukraine. Older reports by the International Organization for Migration in May 2022 show approximately eight million Ukrainians as internally displaced persons. By 20 March 2022, nearly one-quarter of Ukraine's total population had been displaced due to active military hostilities with Russia. About 90% of all Ukrainian refugees are women and children; by 24 March, more than half of all children in Ukraine had left their homes, of whom a quarter had left the country as well. Men between the ages of 18 and 60 have been banned from leaving the country under Ukrainian martial law, which came into force a few hours into Russia's first military offensive into Ukraine. This ongoing escalation of the Russo-Ukrainian War has caused the largest refugee crisis in the 21st century and the fourth-largest refugee crisis in modern history as a whole, with the highest refugee flight rate globally. It is also the first European refugee crisis since the Yugoslav Wars in the 1990s and the largest one to have occurred in Europe since World War II.

The vast majority of Ukrainian refugees initially entered neighbouring countries to the west of Ukraine (Poland, Slovakia, Hungary, Romania, and Moldova). Around three million of these people then moved further west to other European countries. As of May 2025, the UNHCR reports that the countries in which the largest numbers of Ukrainians had applied for asylum, or other temporary protection, are Germany (1.2 million), Poland (1 million), and the Czech Republic (0.4 million). As of September 2022, Human Rights Watch has documented that Ukrainian civilians, particularly children, have been forcibly transferred to Russia. The OHCHR has corroborated this claim, stating that "There have been credible allegations of forced transfers of unaccompanied children to Russian-occupied territory, or to the Russian Federation itself." The United States Department of State estimated that at least 900,000 Ukrainian citizens (including children) were forcibly transferred to Russia in the first six months after the invasion. Around the same time in late 2022, more than 4.5 million Ukrainians had returned to Ukraine, owing to the withdrawal of Russian troops from all fronts but the Donbas and parts of southern Ukraine.

The European Union (EU) has allowed entry to all Ukrainian refugees, and it has also invoked the Temporary Protection Directive to grant displaced Ukrainians the right to stay, work, and study in any EU member state for an initial period of one year. In August 2026, the EU introduced a requirement for newly granted temporary protection to Ukrainian applicants to comply with their military obligations in Ukraine.

The European Union has extended the Temporary Protection Directive until March 2025, showing continued support for Ukrainian refugees across Europe. However, according to the report, older people, those with disabilities, and individuals with serious medical conditions are facing increasing challenges, that will possibly cause them to return to Ukraine sooner.

== Agriculture and food supplies ==
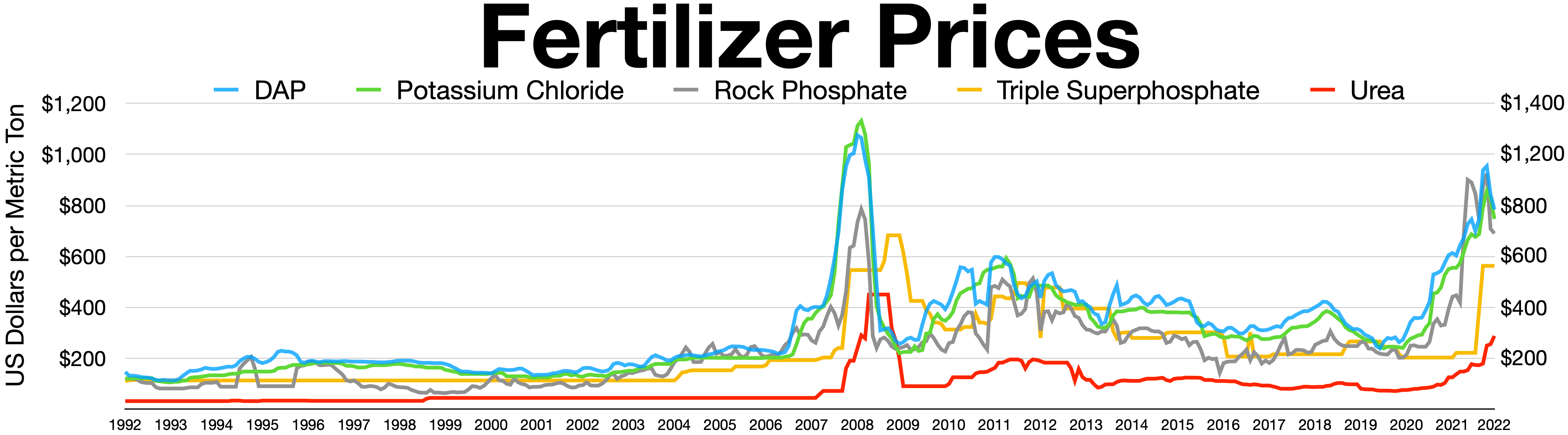
Fertilizer prices DAP Potassium chloride Phosphorite Triple Superphosphate Urea

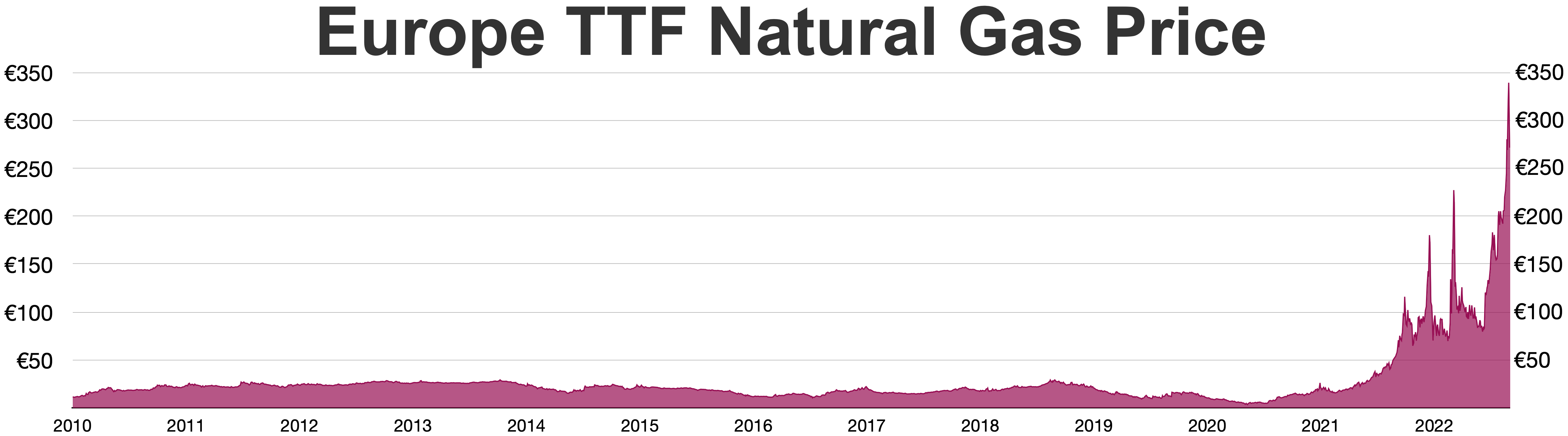
Europe TTF natural gas

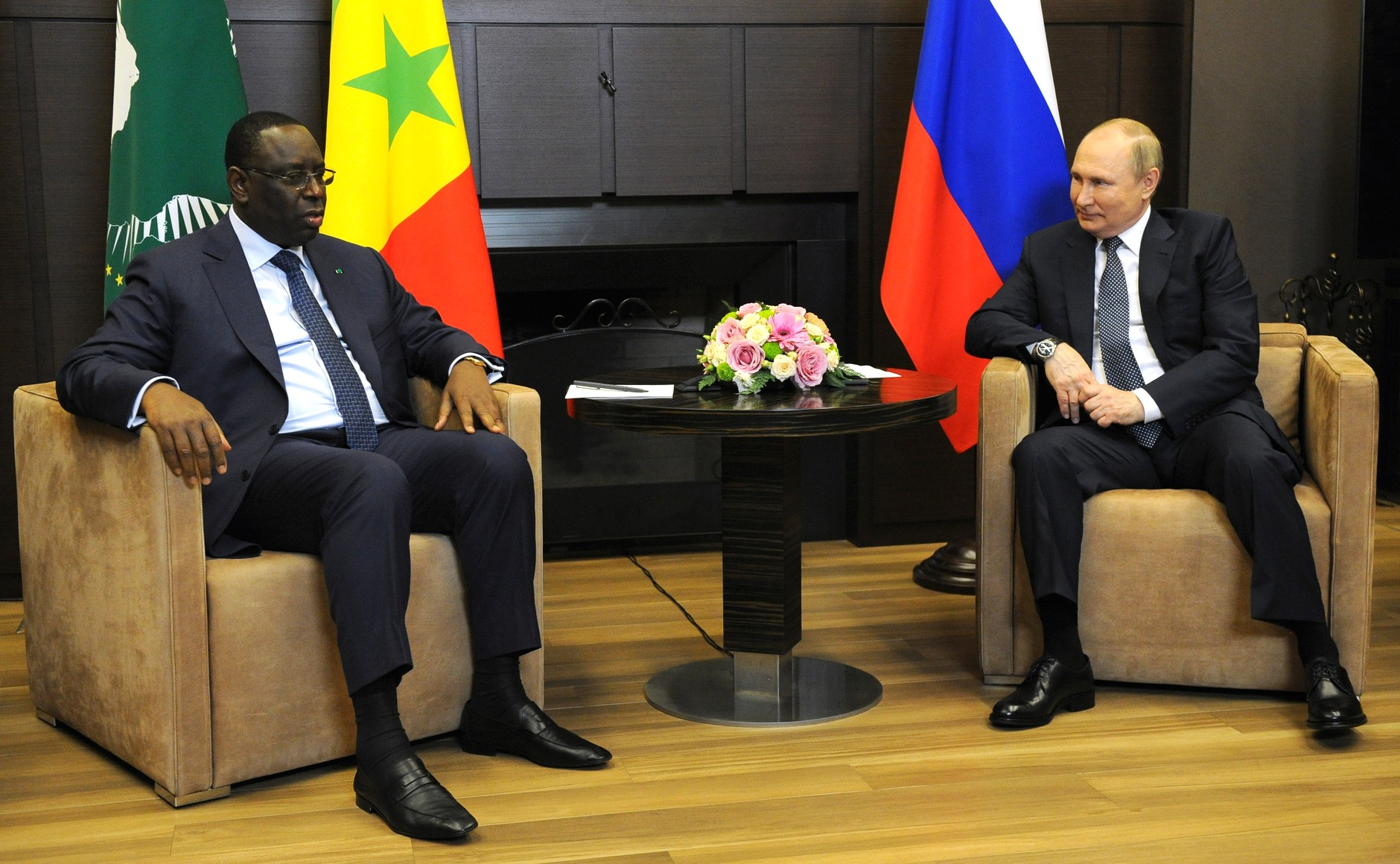
Putin met with the President of the African Union, Macky Sall, to discuss grain deliveries from Russia and Ukraine to Africa, on 3 June 2022

Ukraine has been among the world's top agricultural producers and exporters and is often described as the "breadbasket of Europe." During the 2020/21 international wheat marketing season (July–June), it ranked as the sixth-largest wheat exporter, accounting for nine per cent of world wheat trade. The country is also a major global exporter of maize, barley, and rapeseed. In 2020/21, it accounted for 12 per cent of global trade in maize and barley and for 14 per cent of world rapeseed exports. Its trade share is even greater in the sunflower oil sector, with the country accounting for about 50 per cent of world exports in 2020/2021.

Disruptions to the grain and oilseed sectors of Ukraine were thought inevitable. On the eve of the invasion, an estimated 6 million tons of wheat and 15 million tons of corn had been readied for export. According to the Food and Agriculture Organization of the United Nations (FAO), this would cause further loss of life and increase humanitarian needs. In addition, potential food, and fertiliser export difficulties encountered by the Russian Federation, which is a major exporter of potash, ammonia, urea, and other soil nutrients, as a result of economic sanctions could jeopardise the food security of many countries. Rising natural gas prices are pushing agricultural fertiliser prices higher, contributing to increasing food prices globally. Particularly vulnerable are those that are highly dependent on Ukraine and the Russian Federation for their food and fertiliser imports. Several of these countries fall into the Least Developed Country (LDC) group, while many others belong to the group of Low-Income Food-Deficit Countries (LIFDCs). For example, Eritrea sourced 47% of its wheat imports in 2021 from Ukraine. The other 53% came from the Russian Federation. Overall, more than 30 nations depend on Ukraine and Russia for over 30% of their wheat import needs, with many of them located in North Africa and in Western and Central Asia.

From the start of the invasion, Russian forces already occupied Ukraine's Crimean peninsula, and quickly overran the remainder of its Azov Sea coast, the Black Sea coast east of the city of Kherson. The Russian navy imposed a blockade of Ukraine's ports, threatening to launch an amphibious assault against the port city of Odesa, and preventing the export of the 2021 harvest by sea. Ukraine and partner countries made efforts to step up exports by land, but sea shipping capacity was needed to ship significant volumes and empty storage facilities for the 2022 harvest. The defeat of Russian forces on Snake Island on 30 June offered some relief, with Ukraine opening four ports on and near the Danube River.

A Russian attack damaged the Kozarovychi Dam, which regulates flow from the Kyiv Reservoir, causing flooding along the Irpin River. A Russian missile attack on Kyiv Dam on the Dnieper River was blocked by Ukrainian defences. A breach could have triggered flooding of parts of Kyiv, damaged downstream dams, and threatened the Zaporizhzhia Nuclear Power Plant. Russian forces blew up the dam on the North Crimean Canal which Ukraine had erected to block water flow to agricultural lands in Crimea seized by Russia in 2014. Russians cut civilian water service as part of the Siege of Mariupol.

The Ukrainian Defence Ministry accused Russia of stealing "hundreds of thousands of tonnes of grain" from grain elevators and other storage facilities throughout occupied Ukraine, and transporting the grain to occupied ports for export. Substantial quantities of farm equipment, combine harvesters, and tractors have also been looted from farms and dealerships and transported to Russia, as far away as Chechnya in some cases. Theft of grain from occupied regions of Ukraine has the potential to intensify food crises, with both the Ukrainian Minister of Agriculture and the U.N. World Food Programme warning that this could worsen the Ukrainian food crisis, and even exacerbate global hunger. On 30 May, Russia claimed that it had started exporting last year's grain from Kherson to Russia and were working on exporting sunflower seeds. Russian Foreign Minister Sergey Lavrov said: "If Kyiv solves the problem of demining ports, the Russian Navy will ensure the unimpeded passage of ships with grain to the Mediterranean Sea." According to locals, Russian soldiers were picking strawberries in Kherson Oblast.

The head of the African Union, Senegalese President Macky Sall, met with President Putin on 3 June to discuss the "liberation of the stocks of grain and fertilizers," President Sall's office said, and discuss efforts "to contribute to the lull of the war in Ukraine." He also blamed EU sanctions on Russian banks and products for worsening the situation.

Ukrainian grain harvest in 2022, according to the UK MoD, will be 35% of its 2021 harvest.

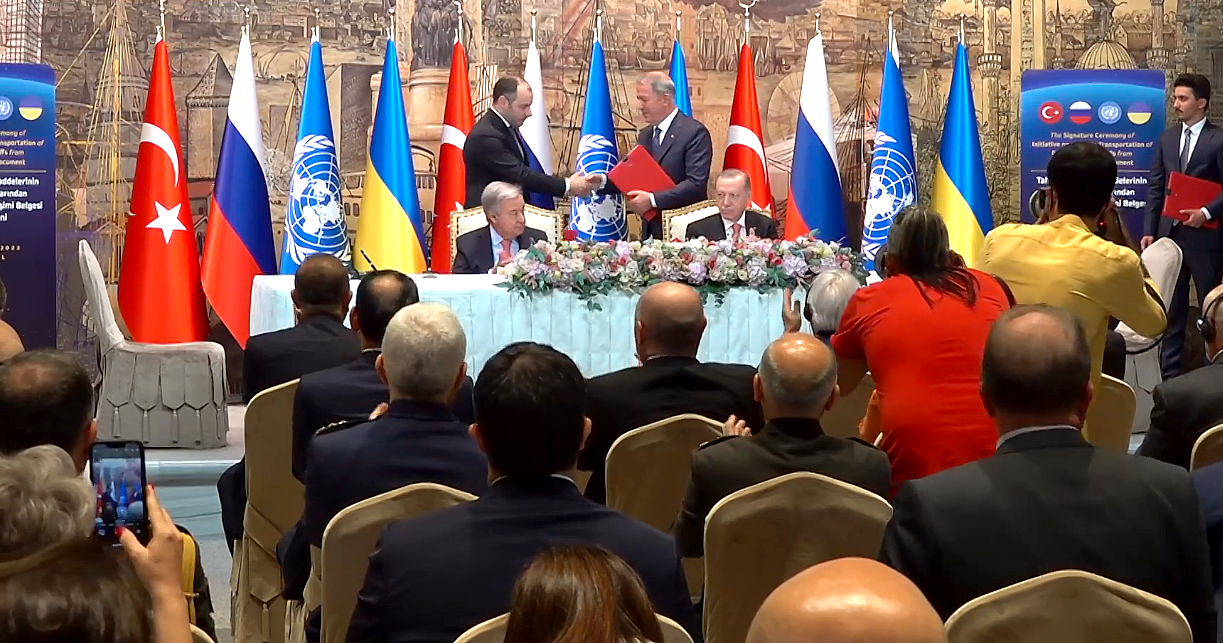
Russia and Ukraine signed an agreement with Turkey, under United Nations supervision, for the safe export of Ukrainian grain from blockaded ports

Ukrainian, Russian, and UN negotiators met in Turkey in mid-July to consider a plan to ship grain out of Ukrainian Black Sea ports. UN Secretary-General António Guterres called the talks a "ray of hope to ease human suffering and alleviate hunger around the world," but said a plan was "not yet fully done". The Turkish Defence Minister, Hulusi Akar, released a statement: "At this meeting, which we will hold next week, all the details will be reviewed once again and the work we have done will be signed," On 22 July, two Russia–Ukraine grain export deals were signed, a UN–Turkey–Russia agreement and a UN–Turkey–Ukraine agreement to allow the export of grain from Ukrainian ports. Within 24 hours, Russia attacked the Port of Odesa with cruise missiles.

On 1 August, the first vessel with grain left Odesa under the deal between Ukraine and Russia for the export of food from Ukraine. According to Turkey, the ship will be headed for Lebanon and carries 26,000 tonnes of corn.

As of 12 August 14 ships, carrying various grains and corn, have successfully left Ukrainian ports. With the first two under a UN-sponsored deal.

As of 26 August, according to Ukrainian President Volodymyr Zelenskyy, some 1 million tonnes of grain have been exported by Ukraine. Some 44 ships have gone to 15 countries. Another 70 ships had applied to be loaded with grain. The stated aim, according to the Ukrainian President, is 3 million tonnes a month.

== Effects on Russian forces ==
Several Russian soldiers, captured by Ukrainian forces, claimed that Russian officers killed their wounded. There were also claims that Russian soldiers have killed their commanding officers, and sometimes themselves. For example, Ukrainian intelligence released a phone intercept that it claims is between a soldier and his mother: "I had a commander who shot himself in the leg just to get out of here. And that was in the very beginning [of the war]." In another call, the wife of a soldier tells him to "fall off a tank or something – I don't fucking know! Because you'd be able to go home straight from the hospital." A Russian court revealed that it had dismissed 115 National Guard members for refusing to fight in the invasion.

In March 2022 it was revealed that Russian conscripts had taken part in the war despite it having been denied earlier. Some mothers of conscripted Russian soldiers have tried to get them out of Ukraine and returned to Russia. A number of mothers have approached the Soldiers' Mothers Committee for advice. Human rights lawyers and activists are claiming that Russian professional soldiers, also known as contract soldiers, are seeking legal advice so that they do not have to fight in Ukraine. Russian soldiers continue to complain of an extended tour of duty. Some have sought legal advice to get out of the army, however, they have been told that they are in for the length of their contracts. The pro-Russia militias raised in Donetsk and Luhansk have videos showing that they lack even basic protective armour and have old equipment. Russian forces have made up for the shortages of troops by recruiting from non-Russian sources, including mercenaries such as the Wagner Group, and recruiting from Russian-controlled areas of Ukraine.

The UK Ministry of Defence claimed, on 19 June, that: "The Russian authorities likely struggle to bring legal pressure to bear on military dissenters, hampered by the invasion's official status as a 'special military operation' rather than as a war." It has also been reported that Russian soldiers and whole units have refused to obey their commanders' orders and have engaged in armed stand-offs with them. By June 2022, the militia of the Donetsk People's Republic had suffered 55% attrition during the fighting in the Donbas, according to the UK MoD, who also claimed Russia was very likely to deploy a large number of reserve units to the Donbas. Russia has stopped sending conscripts to the Donbas, forcing Russian forces to rely on local proxies due to what UK intelligence calls "extraordinary attrition."

According to the report of the British Ministry of Defence of 27 June 2022, Russian Armed Forces use reservists of the Mobilization Human Reserve in its combat operations in Ukraine. These reservists fill out third battalions within regular brigades.

Ukraine claims that Russia is trying to mobilize Crimean residents to fight in the Russian army. The Russian State Duma is considering a new federal law that would force private companies to support the "special military and counterterrorist operations." Giving the government powers to force private businesses to accept government contracts, denying them the right to refuse such work, and unilaterally changing employees' working conditions. So to allow the government to "concentrate efforts in certain sectors of the economy." The bill also raises the issue of repairing Russian military equipment.

The proposed bill would put the Russian economy on a "war footing." It passed the first vote unanimously in the lower house of the State Duma. Deputy Prime Minister Yury Borisov said: "The load on the defence industry has increased significantly. In order to guarantee the supply of weapons and ammunition, it is necessary to optimize the work of the military-industrial complex and enterprises that are part of cooperation chains." One of the proposed laws allows the government to force workers to work overtime. The second forces private businesses to supply the government.

On 4 July President Putin also commented on Russian forces fighting in Luhansk, saying they "should rest, increase their combat capabilities."

On 7 July, a report by IStories indicated that the brigades hardest hit by the war in Ukraine have started advertising vacancies online to recruit unemployed people as soldiers, sometimes without training.

In July, Russia started a "volunteer mobilisation": 85 federal areas of Russia, including "Crimea and Sevastopol," are expected to raise 400 men per region by the end of the month. Russian media have reported that: "Kursk, Primorskyi Krai, Republic of Bashkortostan, Chuvashia Republic, Chechnya, Republic of Tatarstan, Moscow City, Perm, Nizhny Novgorod, and Orenburg Oblasts" have already created such units. Russian state TV has shown men who appear to be in their 50s and 60s. The new recruits who sign a six-month contract get "3,750 to 6,000 US dollars per month." Some regions are offering a signing bonus of $3,400. According to Russian opposition sources such as Gulagu.net, the Wagner Group has also started recruiting prisoners with the promise of removing their criminal history and a signing-up bonus of 200,000 roubles.

On 29 July a Pentagon media release stated: "We continue to see increased signs of discipline and morale problems in the Russian army. When it comes to Russian morale, the official said there are many reports that detail soldiers at all levels deserting posts or refusing to fight." The Wagner Group has recruited some 1,000 prisoners from 17 prisons around Russia. Those usually selected are murderers or thieves. They must pass a physical test and not be suffering from any serious illness. After a series of interviews they are then given basic training by the Wagner Group before being sent to Ukraine to fight. They offer a salary of 200,000 roubles per month and a death payment to their next of kin. If, after six months of fighting, they still live, they are given a Presidential Pardon.

A study by the Royal United Services Institute shows that Russian weapons found in Ukraine contain many components from foreign countries. Some 450 foreign-made components in 27 examined weapons have been found in advanced weapons such as cruise missiles, air defences, drones, encrypted radios, etc. How these components have reached Russia is not clear; some suggest they have been removed from domestic appliances or third party brokers in Asia. On 11 May, Commerce Secretary Gina Raimondo told Congress: "We have reports from Ukrainians that when they find Russian military equipment on the ground, it's filled with semiconductors that they took out of dishwashers and refrigerators."

Seven council members, from Smolninsky District Council, in St. Petersburg, passed a resolution calling on the State Duma to impeach President Putin for "high treason." Due to his handling of the war in Ukraine. Subsequently, these council members were arrested by police for "actions aimed at discrediting the current Russian government." Likewise, a similar resolution was debated and passed by Moscow’s Lomonosovsky district council.

== Effects on Ukrainian society ==
Collaboration with Russian forces in Crimea is a concern for the Ukrainian government. Some of Russia's greatest gains have been in the south, from Crimea into the Kherson region. That bridges across the Dnieper River were not demolished, allowing Russian forces to cross to the right bank and capture the city of Kherson, has been blamed in part on collaboration with Russian forces. According to Kyiv-based analyst Volodymyr Fesenko: "It was obvious there was treason in Kherson region." In 2022 60 former members of the Security Service of Ukraine (SBU) were working for Russian forces. There are 651 active investigations involving allegations of collaboration and treason in Ukraine. On 31 March 2022, President Zelenskyy sacked the head of the SBU's Kherson office saying: "Now I don't have time to deal with all the traitors, but gradually they will all be punished." Former SBU commander in Crimea Oleh Kulinych is suspected of treason. President Zelenskyy has said of him: "Sufficient evidence has been collected to report this person on suspicion of treason. All his criminal activities are documented." Former head of the SBU Ivan Bakanov has been blamed for the infiltration of the SBU by the FSB. However, others point out that his background as a TV producer, political campaign manager, and childhood friend of President Zelenskyy has made him a poor choice to begin with. US State Department officials have confirmed that they will continue sharing intelligence with Ukraine, saying that they invest in institutions and not personalities.

On 5 June 2022, some 1,400 private citizens faced cases of collaboration and treason, facing up to 15 years in prison if convicted. This is in the face of numerous assassination attempts on Ukrainians accused of collaborating with Russia, which will go higher, the UK Ministry of Defence predicted in July 2022. Especially those officials installed by Russia: "The targeting of officials is likely to escalate, exacerbating the already significant challenges facing the Russian occupiers and potentially increasing the pressure on already reduced military and security formations."

The role of LGBT community members in the Ukrainian military following the 2022 Russian invasion has been credited with shifting public attitudes toward same-sex partnerships in Ukraine. In a January 2023 opinion poll, 56% of Ukrainians agreed that same-sex couples should have the right to register their relationship in the form of a civil partnership, while 24% disagreed. 44% supported same-sex marriage; 36% were against it. 30% supported the adoption of children by same-sex couples; 48% were against. A May 2013 poll had found that 4.6% of respondents were in favour of same-sex marriage and 16% supported other forms of recognition, while 79.4% were opposed to any form of recognition.

== Other impacts ==
Ukraine had a significant fertility tourism service industry, which was severely impacted. At the start of the invasion, surrogate mothers were displaced and distressed, requiring evacuation to safe areas. One IVF clinic struggled to obtain enough liquid nitrogen to keep 19,000 embryos and eggs viable.

According to researchers, Black Sea bottlenose dolphins are dying or being injured by the war. Powerful military sonar is being blamed, as are underwater explosions. Exact numbers are thought to be high, with many showing up on the coast near Odesa and in other countries.

According to local officials, on 11 June 2022, the first Russian passports were issued to residents of Kherson and Melitopol in the Russian-occupied regions of Ukraine.

On 21 July 2022, Ukraine devalued its currency by 25% against the U.S. dollar due to the economic impact of the war, to eliminate currency speculation, and to improve the international competitiveness of businesses. The previous day it requested a two-year payment freeze on international bonds; in 2020 it had $130 billion of external debt.

== See also ==
- List of humanitarian aid to Ukraine during the Russo-Ukrainian War
- List of military aid to Ukraine during the Russo-Ukrainian War
