= Southern Natural Pipeline =

Location
- Country: United States
- Direction: Southeast-Southwest
- Start: Texas-Louisiana
- Passes through: Alabama-Mississippi
- To: Georgia-Florida

General information
- Type: Natural gas
- Owner: Kinder Morgan
- Operator: Southern Natural Gas
- Contractors: Southern Natural Gas Company
- Commissioned: 1928

Technical information
- Length: 8,000 mi (13,000 km)

Southern Natural Pipeline (Sonat) is a natural gas pipeline system which brings gas from the Louisiana Gulf of Mexico coast to the southeastern United States. It also has a connection to the Elba Island LNG terminal in Georgia. It is owned by Kinder Morgan and is part of its Birmingham, Alabama based Southern Natural Gas division. Its FERC code is 6.
