= Jianxiawo =

Lithium mine in Jiangxi, China

Jianxiawo mine
- Location within Jiangxi Location within China
- Location: Jiangxi, China; 28°36′47.66″N 114°57′39.56″E
- Products: Lithium

The Jianxiawo mine is one of the largest lithium mines in China and the world. The mine is located in Yichun prefectural city, Jiangxi province, southeast-central China. It produces about 46,000 tons of lithium carbonate yearly, which is equivalent to 3% of the world's produce of lithium as of 2025.

Its closure in August 2025 due to expired permits caused lithium prices to spike as well as those of lithium mining companies.
