= Zeebrugge Hub =

Natural gas physical trading point in Belgium

The Zeebrugge Hub (ZTP) is the natural gas Zeebrugge Trading Point in Zeebrugge, Belgium. It is connected to the National Balancing Point (UK) via the Interconnector.

== See also ==
- Glossary of terms used in the trading of oil and gas, utilities and mining commodities
