= Title Transfer Facility =

Virtual gas market place in The Netherlands

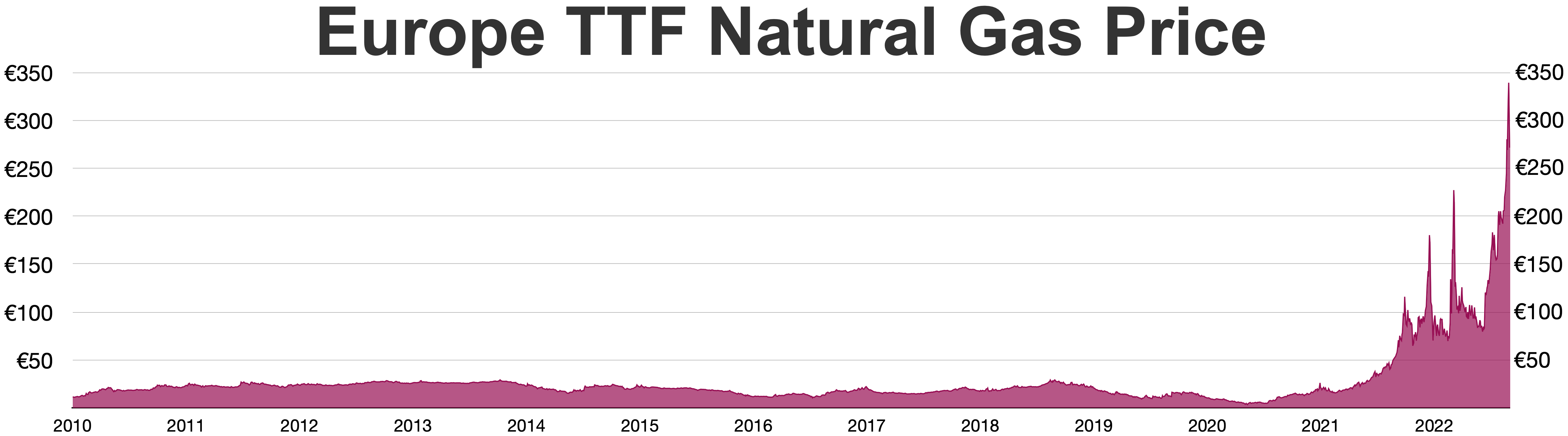
Europe TTF natural gas

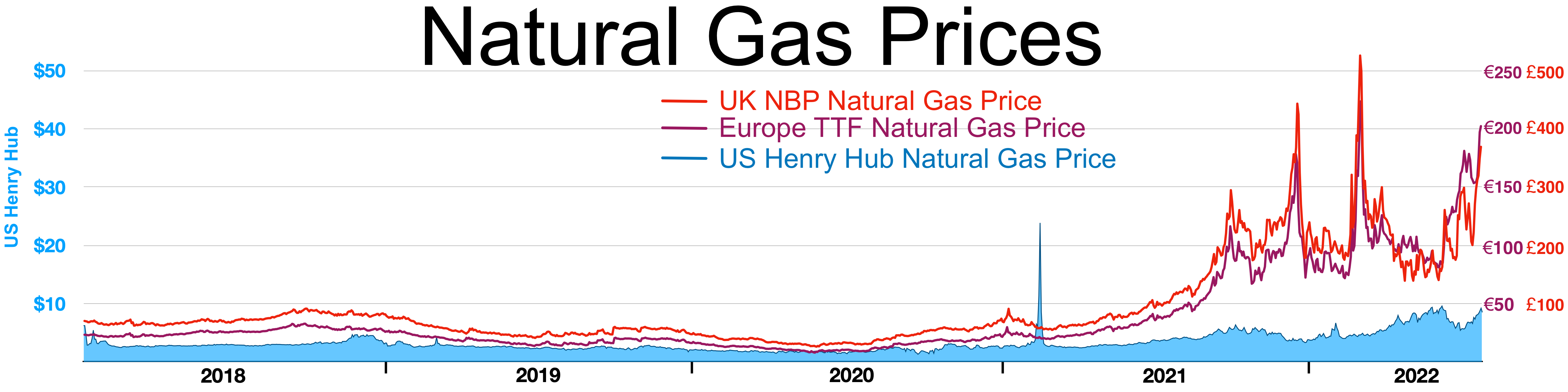
Natural gas prices in Europe and United States National Balancing Point NBP (UK) natural gas prices Europe TTF natural gas prices United States Henry Hub natural gas prices

The Title Transfer Facility, more commonly known as TTF, is a Dutch virtual trading point for natural gas. This trading point provides facility for a number of traders in the Netherlands to trade futures, physical and exchange trades.

Set up by Gasunie in 2003, it is similar to the National Balancing Point (NBP) in the United Kingdom and allows gas to be traded within the Dutch Gas network. The network historically developed due to extraction of gas from the country's natural gas fields both on and offshore, particularly the large Groningen gas field. TTF is operated by an independent subsidiary of Gasunie, Gasunie Transport Services B.V., which is the Gas Transmission System Operator in the Netherlands. Wholesale gas trading at the TTF is predominantly conducted over-the-counter via interdealer brokers. Physical short-term gas and gas futures contracts are also traded and handled by the ICE-Endex Exchange (Amsterdam) and via the PEGAS exchange. Gas at TTF trades in euros per megawatt hour.

In the two decades since its inception trades at the Dutch TTF have grown exponentially and exceeded domestic volumes in the Netherlands fourteen-fold. This increase, helped by the rise of liquefied natural gas (LNG), caused the TTF to overtake the UK's National Balancing Point (NBP) and become Europe's biggest gas benchmark.

== See also ==
- LNG Price Assessment and Benchmark
- National Balancing Point (UK)
- Henry Hub
- EU natural gas price cap – Price cap imposed by EU
- Natural gas prices – Wholesale prices in the market of natural gas
