= Powernext =

- Type: Physical commodity and derivates exchange (energy)
- Location: Paris, France
- Founded: 2001
- Key people: Egbert Laege, CEO
- Currency: EUR
- Commodities: Natural gas
- Website: www.powernext.com

Powernext SA, incorporated in 2001, is a regulated market operating under AMF supervision. Based in Paris, Powernext manages the natural gas activities of the EEX Group under the PEGAS brand throughout Europe, and operates the National Registry for electricity guarantees of origin in France.

As of 1 January 2016, the European Energy Exchange (EEX) is the majority shareholder with 87.73 percent of the Powernext shares.

A decree by the French Ministry of Ecology, Sustainable Development and Energy, published on 15 January 2013 in the Official Journal, appointed Powernext as the National Registry for electricity guarantees of origin in France. Powernext succeeded RTE as the guarantee of origin issuing body on 1 May 2013 for a five-year term.
