= National Balancing Point (UK) =

Virtual trading point for natural gas

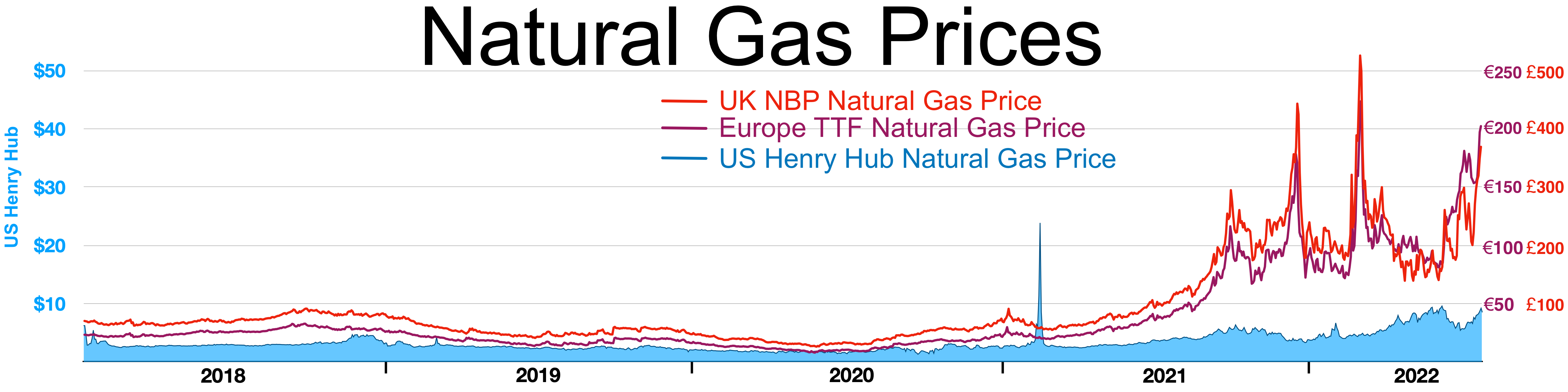
Natural gas prices in Europe and United States National Balancing Point NBP (UK) natural gas prices Europe TTF natural gas prices United States Henry Hub natural gas prices

The National Balancing Point, commonly referred to as the NBP, is a virtual trading location for the sale and purchase and exchange of natural gas in the United Kingdom. It is the pricing and delivery point for the ICE Futures Europe (IntercontinentalExchange) natural gas futures contract. It is the second most liquid gas trading point in Europe, and has a major influence on the price that domestic consumers pay for their gas. Gas at the NBP trades in pence per therm. It is similar in concept to the Henry Hub in the United States but differs in that it is not an actual physical location.

== Operation ==
Unlike continental European trading hubs such as Zeebrugge and TTF, trades made at the NBP are not required to be balanced, and there is no fixed penalty for being out of balance. Instead, shippers out of balance at the end of the day are automatically balanced through the 'cash-out' procedure whereby the shipper is automatically made to buy or sell the required quantity of gas to balance their position at the marginal system buy or sell price for that day. This cash-out process is not considered to be a penalty in the same way as those imposed on shippers in continental markets, because the cash-out prices are often very close to the spot price. As a result of this daily market liquidity, the UK's NBP is frequently used to balance a shipper's position on the continent by way of the Bacton – Zeebrugge interconnector.

Trades at the NBP are made via the OCM trading system, an anonymous trading service managed by ICE ENDEX, to which offers or requests for gas at a nominated price can be posted. The minimum amount of gas that may be traded on the OCM is 4,000 therms, so if a shipper's position is long or short by a volume less than 4,000 therms they may be forced simply to leave their balance to cash out.

== See also ==
- LNG Price Assessment and Benchmark
- Title Transfer Facility
- Henry Hub
