= Isle of Man gas industry =

Gas for lighting and heating has been supplied to users on the Isle of Man starting in 1836; first as town gas, then as liquefied petroleum gas (LPG), and since 2003 natural gas has been available. The future use of hydrogen as a supplementary or substitute fuel is being studied.

== History ==
In 1835 the Douglas Gas Light Company sought legal powers to act as a gas undertaking to make and supply gas to domestic and commercial users in Douglas. These powers were enacted by Tynwald in the Douglas Gas Act 1835. The first gas was made available the following year. Gas undertakings in four other localities were established; these supplied gas to their local area: they were Castletown (Castletown Gas Works Company Limited, 1857), Peel (Peel Gas Light Company, 1857), Rushen (Port Erin and Port St Mary Gas Company), and Ramsey (Ramsey Gas Light Company Limited, 1857).

== Town gas ==
Gas was made by carbonising (roasting) coking coal which produced town gas – or coal gas – and a range of by-products. Although this process had been used for over a century, by the late 1950s coking coal was becoming expensive. Furthermore, gas making was labour-intensive and working conditions were unpleasant, and there were limited uses for some of the toxic by-products. In Britain alternative methods of gas making were being developed, such as reforming, which used refinery tail-gases or light distillate as a feedstock. The discovery of natural gas in the North Sea in 1965 led to the conversion to natural gas and the eventual demise of town gas. On the Isle of Man the last town gas was produced in 1971. Without access to natural gas or gas reforming the Isle of Man relied on liquefied petroleum gas and oil. Half of the space heating requirements are met by gas and half by oil.

From May 1965 to January 1967 the gas works at Castletown, Port St Mary and Peel were purchased and came under the control of the Gas Committee of Tynwald. The purchase was intended to ensure that public gas supplies were maintained. Calor Gas assumed control of the Douglas and Ramsey gas undertakings.

The Isle of Man Gas Authority was established in 1972 to assume the oversight functions of the Gas Committee. In 1974 the Gas Authority merged with the Isle of Man Water Authority to form the Isle of Man Water and Gas Authority.

== Liquefied Petroleum Gas (LPG) ==
Liquefied Petroleum Gas is a significant heat source for the Isle of Man. LPG is a product of oil refining and principally comprises propane and butane. LPG is maintained in a liquid state by being kept under pressure. In 2007 LPG was purchased from Esso Petroleum by the International Energy Group which has an 80% stake in Manx Gas. LPG arrives by ship and is stored in pressurised vessels, including a Horton sphere on Princess Alexandra Pier in Douglas.

The capacities of LPG storage vessels (tanks) across the island are as follows.

LPG storage capacity
Location	Vessel No.	Capacity (tonnes)
Princess Alexandra Pier	10	600
Princess Alexandra Pier	11	600
Battery Pier	2	106 Butane
Battery Pier	3	65 Butane
Battery Pier	6	100
Battery Pier	7	50
Battery Pier	8	65
Battery Pier	9	65
Braddan	1	25 Butane
Braddan	2	25 Butane
Braddan	3	10
Braddan	4	25
Port St Mary	1	12
Port St Mary	2	12
Port St Mary	3	55
Peel	1	20
Peel	2	20
Ramsey	1	10
Ramsey	2	30
Ramsey	3	30
Balthane	1	25
Balthane	2	25
Total		1,975

LPG is transferred by road tanker to storage tanks at Andreas, Foxdale, Jurby, Laxey, Maughold, Santon, and St Johns. From the tanks LPG is vaporised to its gaseous state and distributed to users via local gas distribution networks. The LPG supply network was divided into two areas: Kosangas and Ex-Calor. The former were customers on the system outside the Douglas area that were not converted to natural gas in 2002–3. The ex-Calor area are customers in Ramsey, Peel and Port St Mary. LPG is also delivered to users as bottled gas. Calor Gas operated significant parts of the LPG system on the Isle of Man. In 1967 Calor Gas took over the Douglas and Ramsey Gas Companies.

== Natural Gas ==
=== Exploration ===
In 1982 BP Petroleum Development Limited drilled an exploration well in UK offshore Block 112/25 targeting Triassic sandstones as a possible outlier of the Morecambe Bay gas field. This proved to be water saturated, yet deeper Permian sandstones appeared to be more productive. However, the field was isolated from any infrastructure to produce or export the gas. BP therefore relinquished the license. Block 112/25 was then in UK waters, but now lies within the Isle of Man 12-mile territorial limit. In 2014 Crogga Limited was founded and in 2017 was awarded a production license. Appraisal work and seismic surveys are being undertaken. In 2022 Crogga Limited appointed disgraced oil executive Richard Hubbard as the company's new CEO.

=== Import ===
In 2002 a second gas interconnector pipeline from Scotland to Ireland was constructed by Gas Networks Ireland. The first UK to Ireland interconnector was commissioned in 1993. The pipeline passes within 12 km of the Isle of Man. The opportunity was taken to provide a spur line from the interconnector pipeline to the Isle of Man. This allowed natural gas to be imported for the first time. It also provided a potential export route for gas should the appraisal work be successful and a gas processing facility built.

Import of natural gas from the interconnector, in GWh

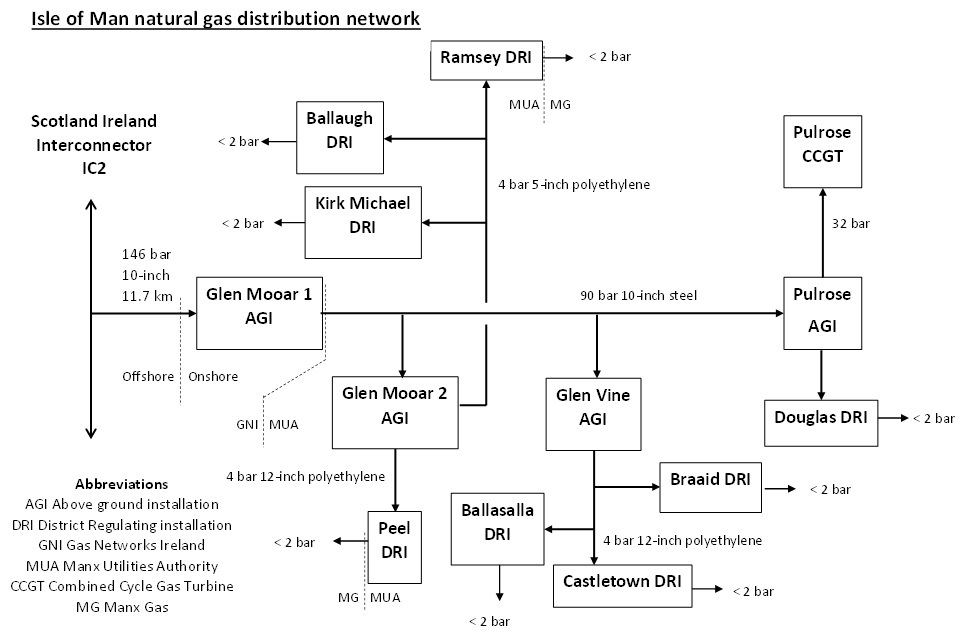
Isle of Man natural gas distribution

=== Distribution ===
In preparation for the arrival of natural gas from the interconnector a gas transmission and distribution network was constructed. The system was designed, built and commissioned by Bord Gas Eireann in compliance with the requirements of the Manx Electricity Authority. In Douglas 15,000 customers were converted from LPG to natural gas. A schematic of the system is shown on the right. The network comprises buried steel and polyethene pipes, four Above Ground Installations (AGI) that reduce the pressure of the gas, and eight District Regulating Installations (DRI) that further reduce the pressure and which supply local distribution systems to gas users. The Manx Utilities Authority buys and delivers gas to the distribution network where it is purchased by Manx Gas.

=== Operation ===
Gas arrives on the island via a 10-inch pipeline operating at up to 146 bar. Glen Mooar 1 AGI measures the flow rate of the gas and reduces the pressure to 90 bar. Gas is transported across the island in a 10-inch steel pipeline to Pulrose AGI where the pressure is reduced to 32 bar for use in the Combined Cycle Gas Turbine (CCGT) in Pulrose power station. Three AGIs take gas from the 10-inch line and reduce the pressure to 4 bar. The gas is routed to the eight DRIs where the pressure is reduced further to not exceeding 2 bar for local distribution. Glen Mooar1 AGI is owned by Gas Networks Ireland but is operated by the Manx Utilities Authority (MUA). The MUA owns the cross-country pipeline, the AGIs, the 4 bar pipelines, and the DRIs. Manx Gas owns, and is responsible for the operation of, the 2 bar distribution networks from the outlet valve of the DRIs.

Key data on gas supply is summarised in the table:

Key gas supply data
Year	2014/5	2015/6	2016/7	2017/8	2018/9	2019/20	2020/1
Gas delivered to Manx Gas, therms	10	10	11	11	10	10.9	10
Gas used for electricity generation, therms	34	30	35	34	34	40.8	39.5

== Hydrogen ==
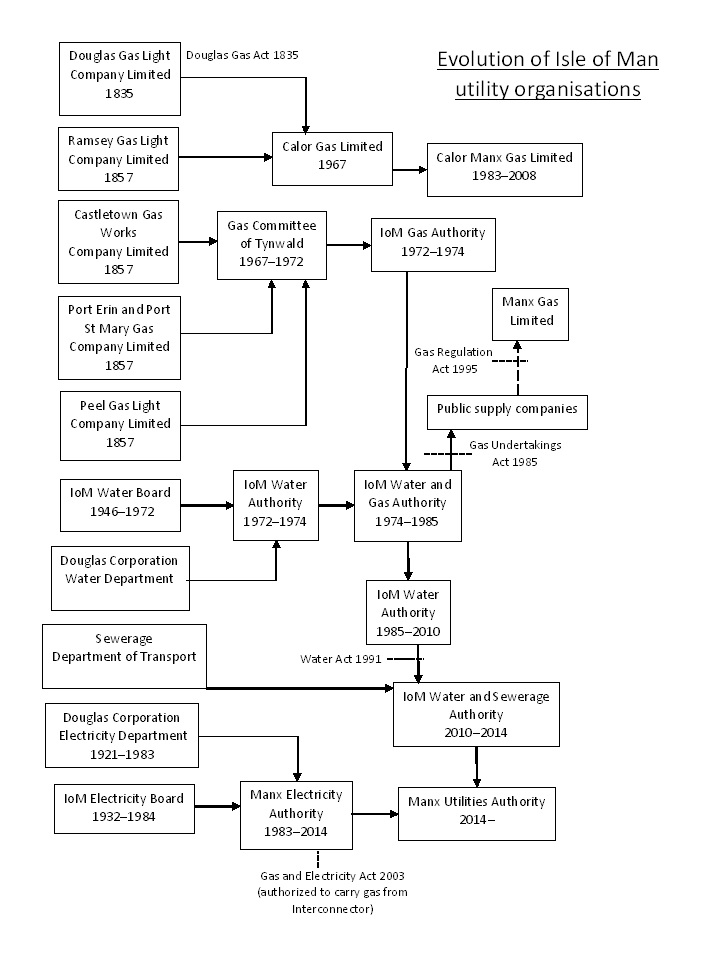
IoM utilities

A recent study has shown that the Isle of Man has the potential to produce ‘green’ hydrogen from renewable energy sources. The study suggests that blending up to 20 percent hydrogen into natural gas would be acceptable for current boilers. The local distribution network comprising polyethylene pipework is compatible with hydrogen. However, the high pressure steel pipelines are not suitable for hydrogen service. Neither are the LPG storage tanks and road tankers.

== Ownership and regulation ==
The gas industries on the Isle of Man have been owned and regulated by a number of organisations. The evolution of ownership and control together with pertinent legislation is summarised in the diagram.

== See also ==
- Economy of the Isle of Man
- Manx Utilities Authority
- Manx Electricity Authority
- Oil and gas industry in the United Kingdom
- List of power stations in the British Crown Dependencies
- United Kingdom–Ireland natural gas interconnectors
