= Water supply and sanitation in the Republic of Ireland =

Ireland: Water and Sanitation

Data
- Access to an improved water source: 100%
- Access to improved sanitation: 99%
- Average urban water use: 80 litres/capita/day (2016)
- Water receiving secondary treatment: 94% (2015)
- Annual investment in water supply and sanitation: €71/capita (2013)

Institutions
- National water and sanitation company: Irish Water took over responsibility from 34 Local Authorities in 2015
- Water and sanitation regulator: Commission for Energy Regulation
- Responsibility for policy setting: Minister for Climate, Energy and the Environment

Water supply and sanitation services in Ireland are governed primarily by the Water Services Acts of 2007 to 2014 and regulated by the Commission for Energy Regulation. Until 2015, the relevant legislation provided for the provision of water and wastewater services by local authorities in Ireland, with domestic usage funded indirectly through central taxation (including motor taxation), and non-domestic usage funded via local authority rates. From 2015, the legislation provided for the setup of a utility company, Irish Water, which would be responsible for providing water and wastewater services, and funded through direct billing. The transition between these models, and certain aspects of operation of the new company, caused controversy in its initial period of operation.

In general in Ireland, water resources are abundant and 83% of drinking water comes from surface water. However, wastage levels were estimated at 800 million litres lost to leaks each day in 2015, while usage levels were calculated at 80 litres per capita per day in 2016. The quality of water from the public mains is usually quite high, with, for example, 98.9% of public water supplies complying with the standards for E. coli levels in 2004. However, the microbiological quality of some rural private group water schemes led to Ireland being cited in 2002 by the European Court of Justice for failing to abide by EU drinking water guidelines.

For wastewater treatment, 94% of wastewater collected in urban area sewers receives at least secondary treatment, and 1.6 billion litres of water are treated each day nationally. Wastewater infrastructure includes 25,000 km of pipes to approximately 1,000 wastewater treatment plants.

== Water resources and use ==
Water resources are abundant in Ireland, with 82% of drinking water supplies in Ireland sourced from surface water (i.e. rivers and lakes) and 18% coming from groundwater – 10.5% from groundwater and 7.6% from springs. This high dependence on surface water is above the EU average. Approximately 2% of Ireland's water resources are abstracted for human use. Unaccounted-for water constitutes 41% of total water supply, followed by supply for domestic demand (39%), and non-domestic demand (20%).

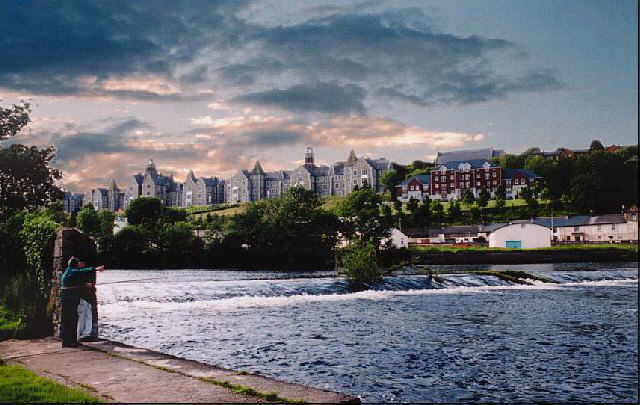
The River Lee is a source of water supply for the city of Cork

80% of the Irish population is served by centralised water supplies. The remaining 20% is served by 643 public group water schemes (serving 2.3% of the population), 486 private group water schemes (serving 4.7%), 1,429 small private supplies (serving 0.7%) and private wells that are exempt from the regulations (serving 12.3%).

Domestic water use is in line with other European countries, with daily domestic consumption of water per capita at approximately 80 litres in Ireland, compared to 121 litres in Germany and 114 litres in Denmark (all users are metered in the latter two countries). At 141 m^{3} per inhabitant, Ireland has the third highest freshwater abstraction rate per inhabitant of 26 EU countries, ranked behind only Italy and Croatia.

Water shortages have left some larger urban areas – particularly Dublin – with supply issues during prolonged dry spells. A 2006 feasibility study for the Greater Dublin water supply urged the development of a new water source, pointing out that it would be needed by 2015–2016 to avert water rationing and the curtailment of economic growth. It also noted that it would take at least a decade to build the proposed new source, with a 2007 report suggesting a lengthy pipeline to Dublin from Lough Derg and the Shannon.

== Water supply service provision ==
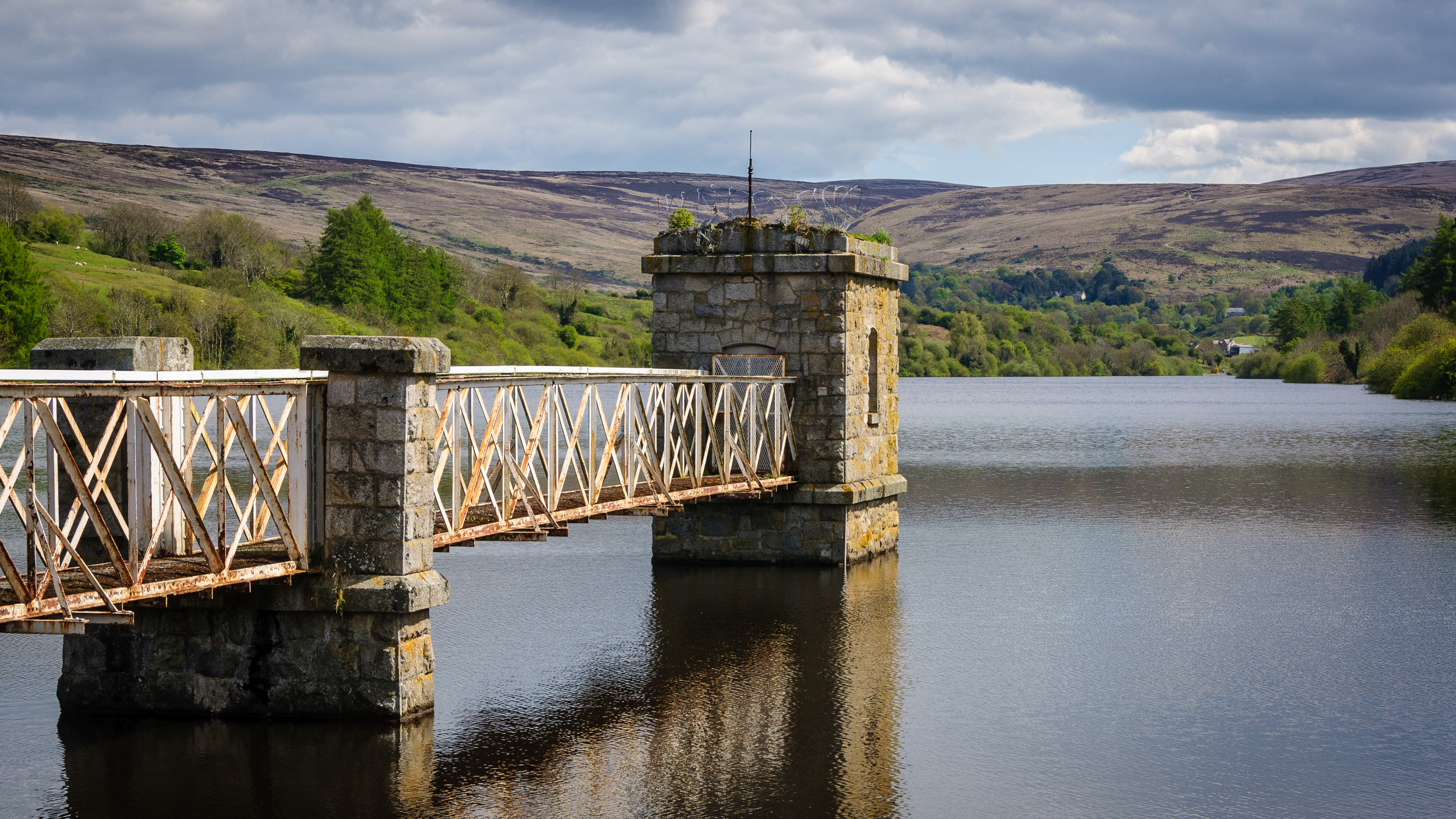
Upper reservoir of Bohernabreena Waterworks, Glenasmole

=== Public (mains) water supply ===
80% of the population is supplied by centralised public water systems. Public water supply systems and providers are governed by the Water Services Acts of 2007 to 2014. Until 2015, this legislation provided for the provision of water and wastewater services by local authorities, with domestic usage funded through central taxation, and non-domestic usage funded via local authority rates. From 2015, legislation came into force such that a new utility company, Irish Water, became responsible for providing water and wastewater services. The new company was set up as a subsidiary of an existing semi-state corporation, Bord Gáis (Ervia). The newly created company effectively took on the existing local authority employees and water management facilities, pipes and infrastructure. Operationally, Irish Water delegated some work, for example water meter installation and customer support, to sub-contractors.

=== Group water schemes ===
20% of the population is supplied by wells, small private supplies and public or private group schemes. Group water schemes are found in rural areas and are outside the scope of the centralised public mains systems. A group scheme is a scheme servicing water or wastewater services to two or more households not connected to the centralised water supply and/or wastewater collection systems. Group schemes are private or public, depending on whether their water is supplied from the public mains or a private source. All group schemes connected to centralised supplies are fitted with a water meter for monitoring the amount of water used by the group. The EPA 2011 report on drinking water quality in Ireland indicated that there were 1,129 group water schemes, serving 7% of the public, covered by the Drinking Water Regulations because they serve more than 50 people or supply a commercial operation. 643 are public group schemes and 486 are private group water schemes.

The National Federation of Group Water Schemes was established to represent the interests of members of group water schemes, and to provide advisory, training, developmental and other services to scheme members.

=== Water supply quality ===
The quality of water from the public mains is usually quite high and compliant with EU drinking water standards. However, 2011 reports noted poor microbiological quality in some rural private group water schemes and groundwater and challenged the authorities then responsible for drinking water.

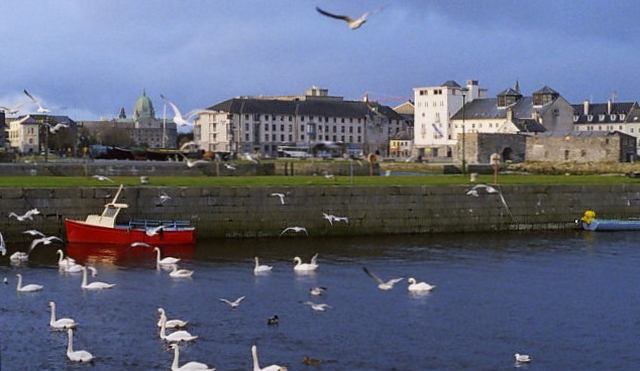
The city of Galway, supplied with water by the River Corrib, was subject to an outbreak of waterborne cryptosporidiosis in 2007

In 2007, there was an outbreak of waterborne cryptosporidiosis in Galway, which caused illness in over 240 people, and led to the imposition of a boil water notice in Galway for a period of 5 months during the peak tourist season. According to the Environmental Protection Agency (EPA), while "many have taken the quality of drinking water in Ireland for granted in the past, this can no longer be the case".

On 14 November 2002, authorities in Ireland were cited by the European Court of Justice over the microbiological contamination of hundreds of public and private water supplies. The EU's Drinking Water Directive requires an absence of E. coli in drinking water supplies to protect human health.

The Environmental Protection Agency's 2011 report on drinking water stated that drinking water quality in public water supplies was continuing to improve. At that time, chemical standard compliance stood at 99.5%. 1.3% of supplies were found to have had E.coli, a reduction of 86% since 2005. 10.2% of private group supplies had E.coli, down from 11.6% in 2010. 7.7% of small private supplies were found to have E.coli exceedences, down from 7.4% in 2010.

In October and November 2013, difficulties were encountered with the water supply to Dublin. The Ballymore Eustace water treatment works which processes water from its main supply, the Poulaphouca reservoir, experienced a change in water characteristics. The effect was that particles in the water would not settle, leaving tap water cloudy. As a result, the supply to the Dublin was restricted for two days.

Cryptosporidium contamination risk led to "boil notices" remaining in place in parts of County Roscommon for approximately six-years from 2009 to 2015.

In 2017 there was significant disruption to water supply services in parts of County Meath, County Louth and Drogheda, with 70,000 people without water for some time during July.

== Wastewater treatment ==
The proportion of waste water discharges where secondary treatment facilities have been provided increased significantly from 26% between 1998–1999 to 93% by 2011. This was due predominantly to the new wastewater treatment plants at Ringsend (Dublin) (which, at the time, was believed to be the largest construction of a new water treatment facility in Europe serving 1.5million people, Cork City, Limerick City, Galway City and Dundalk.

According to a 2011 EPA report, 11 of 174 agglomerations covered by the Urban Wastewater Treatment Directive did not have the required level of wastewater treatment, but were expected to have secondary treatment by 2015. 70% of agglomerations (larger urban areas in Ireland) were compliant with the requirements of the Directive in 2011, an improvement on 63% compliance in 2010 and 57% in 2009.

As of 2011, while 66% of households were connected to public sewerage schemes, with the majority in urban areas, 27.5% of households used an individual septic tank, and 3% adopted other individual sewerage systems.

In October 2009, the European Court of Justice ruled against Ireland regarding septic tanks and other on-site wastewater treatment systems. It deemed Ireland non-compliant with Articles 4 and 8 of the Waste Directive in relation to domestic wastewaters disposed of in the countryside. Ireland was fined €2 million and the court imposed daily fines of €12,000 for each day of delay in achieving compliance. Central to ending the case against Ireland was establishing a national inspection plan for domestic wastewater treatment systems, and in 2012, the government passed the Water Services (Amendment) Act 2012. A new registration and inspection regime was introduced in June 2012, and by July 2013, almost 90% of owners of premises connected with such systems had registered their systems.

== Regulation ==
=== Environmental and quality regulation ===
Water services authorities were historically responsible for the monitoring of drinking water. Local authorities were responsible for testing the quality of water, in conjunction with the Local Health Office (HSE). Under the 2007 Drinking Water Regulations, the EPA had supervisory powers for public water supplies, and could direct a water services authority to improve the management or quality of a public water supply. Where the EPA found deficiencies, it would make recommendations as to what action the water services authority needed to take to remedy any deficiency. Likewise, water services authorities had a supervisory role in relation to group water schemes and private supplies, and would notify the EPA of drinking water non-compliances or risks to public health from a public water supply. Since the formation of Irish Water, it is legally obliged to "submit all drinking water quality results for compliance testing to the EPA on an annual basis".

=== Economic regulation ===
Prior to 2013, there was no economic regulator for water supply and sanitation in Ireland. Under the 2013 Water Services Act and Water Services (Amendment) No. 2 Bill 2013, the Commission for Energy Regulation was assigned powers to advise the Minister for the Environment, Community and Local Government on the development and become the economic regulator of water services.

== Financial aspects and efficiency ==
=== Tariffs ===
In 2013, €326 million was allocated by the Department of the Environment, Community and Local Government for infrastructural spending on water, corresponding to €71 per capita.

In July 2014 the Commission for Energy Regulation announced that the standard metered rate for water and wastewater would include 30 m^{3} per year of free basic water, after which €4.88/m^{3} including taxes would be charged. Rates were to be capped until March 2015 at an annual fixed rate of €176 plus €102 for every additional adult living in a household.

Prior to the formation of Irish Water, all water charges for domestic use in urban areas in Ireland were paid for by general taxation. Domestic use is defined as drinking, washing, heating and sanitation. There were approximately 1.35 million domestic water connections served by public water supplies. Members of rural group water schemes usually pay for domestic water and wastewater services. As part of a Programme of Assistance agreed with the EC-ECB-IMF 'troika' in November 2010, the Fianna Fáil-Green Party government committed to introducing domestic water charges in 2012/2013. This followed a commitment made in the Renewed Programme for Government, published in October 2009, to introduce charges based on a system of a free allowance per household, with charges on usage above the allowance. One month before the government's agreement with the troika, the administration's 'National Recovery Plan 2010–2014' stated that metering would form part of charges and be introduced by 2014. Domestic water charges, a requirement under the EC-ECB-IMF's Programme of Assistance, were to be introduced in Quarter 4 2014, with households receiving their first bills in Quarter 1 2015. Bills would be issued for usage in arrears, similar to those for electricity or gas.

Households were to receive a free allowance, with charges based on metered usage above the free allowance. Environment Minister Phil Hogan said households unmetered at the time of charges introduction would be charged on an assessed basis (e.g. dwelling type, number of people in a house etc.).

Non-domestic customers pay a combined charge for water and wastewater. Local authorities set the rates. In 2013, the national average water rate stood at €1.13 per m^{3}. The national average wastewater rate was €1.19 per m^{3}. €2.37 per m^{3} is the average combined rate. Some variation exists in the local authorities' rates, with Kildare County Council having a combined rate of €1.59 per m^{3}, in contrast with €3.04 per m^{3} charged by Wicklow County Council. The cost of water for industrial users has remained relatively static since 2007.

=== Investment ===
Under the EU's Urban Waste Water Treatment Directive 1991, local authorities are obliged to construct secondary and tertiary water treatment plants by 2008. New wastewater treatment plants were built in Dublin, Cork, Limerick and Galway between 2000 and 2011, generating additional capacity equivalent to the needs of a population of 3.96 million. Over the same period, drinking water treatment capacity has been increased by an amount sufficient to meet the needs of a population equivalent of 1.4 million people. The compliance level under the EU Urban Wastewater Treatment Directive increased from 25% to 93%. Under the government's 'Infrastructure and Capital Investment 2012–2016' blueprint, €1.58 billion in capital investment is to be allocated for water services between 2012 and 2016, with €326 million now earmarked for 2013. The majority of the funding will be channelled through the 2010–2013 Water Services Investment Programme, which is targeting reduction in leakage levels; improvements in drinking water standards; capacity and security of supply (including planning a new long-term source for the Greater Dublin Area) and wastewater discharges. Infrastructure under the Greater Dublin Strategic Drainage Strategy is also promised.

=== Financing and subsidies ===
Funding for maintaining and improving the water supply and sanitation infrastructure comes from the Department of Environment, Community and Local Government. Indirectly, substantial funding historically came from the European Union through its European Regional Development Fund. In addition, local authorities levy planning contributions mainly for small capital improvements. Group scheme members are entitled to a subsidy from their local authority. After the abolition of domestic water charges in 1997, it was intended that this scheme would extend those benefits to households supplied by group water schemes. The amount of subsidy is 100% of the qualifying expenditure, meaning that all running costs of the scheme are covered by the subsidy as long as they do not exceed the subsidy limit. The amount is around €50 per house per year. Group water schemes are also entitled to technical and grant assistance for any upgrading works that may need to be carried out.

=== Efficiency and levels of water leakage ===
Leakage levels in Ireland currently stand at 41%, with considerable variation between local authorities, in part explained by corrosion of antiquated pipes. As part of the National Water Study, conducted in 2000, a water audit was undertaken for 91 water schemes outside Dublin to establish levels of non-revenue water (NRW). The report noted that the poor quality of data and the low level of consumer metering limited the reliability of their figures. They found an average level of NRW of 47%, corresponding to 34 litres/connection/hour and 29 m3/km/day. This compares to only 10.1 m3/km/day in England, Scotland 21.3 m3/km/day, Netherlands 1.6 m3/km/day and Denmark 1.7 m3/km/day.

== Development of water charges ==
=== First abolition of domestic water charges (1970s) ===
Domestic rates, which financed the cost of water services, were abolished for the first time by a Fianna Fáil government following the 1977 general election. In the same period, an increase took place in Income Tax and Value Added Tax. The revenue from these increases, and from borrowing (which was high during the late 1970s and early 1980s), was used to fund the local authorities. These had previously relied on domestic rates for their funding, but from this time the central government paid a "rate support grant" to local authorities.

However, in 1983 the then Fine Gael-Labour government decided to cut this grant and passed legislation to allow councils to levy service charges. This was perceived by some as "double taxation", since the previously increased taxes remained at their high levels. Opponents also argued that rates were unrelated to consumption and that there were insufficient provisions to protect the poor.

=== Dublin fight against water charges (1994–1997) ===
A number of councils decided to introduce water charges, while others such as Dublin initially decided against introducing them. After water charges were introduced in Dublin in 1994, an anti-water charges campaign was initiated and included demonstrations and a boycott of the new charges. The city threatened to cut the water supply to those who did not pay. After lengthy court battles, some non-paying users were cut off, but the non-payment of water charges continued. On 19 December 1996, on the eve of general elections, the Minister for the Environment Brendan Howlin from the Labour Party of the Rainbow Government of Fine Gael–Labour Party–Democratic Left announced that the water charge was going to be replaced by a new system in which motor tax collected in each area would be the source for local council funding.

=== Second abolition of domestic water charges (1990s) ===
Domestic water charges in Ireland were thus prohibited under the Local Government (Financial Provisions) Act 1997, passed in May 1997 shortly before the June 1997 general elections in which Fine Gael lost to Fianna Fáil under Bertie Ahern. However, because of popular discontent, the new government chose not to pursue domestic water charges. Instead, it embarked on consultations which resulted in the 1998 Water Services Pricing Policy. This policy banned cross-subsidy of domestic services from non-domestic charges. For non-domestic users, the policy required the recovery of average operational and marginal capital costs of water services from these users. It also foresaw the metering of all non-domestic users by 2006. Domestic operational costs were to be paid for through a local government fund, and capital costs were to be financed through the capital programme of the Department of the Environment, Community and Local Government.

=== Water Services Bill 2003 ===
The Water Services Bill 2003 was presented to the Oireachtas by then Environment Minister, Martin Cullen of Fianna Fáil. The bill was designed to consolidate Ireland's existing body of 15 different enactments into a single act, and to transpose EU water legislation. Cullen called it "the first root and branch consolidation and modernisation of water services law for more than 120 years since the Public Health (Ireland) Act 1878", adding that "like the Victorian sewers which we have upgraded or replaced, this Bill replaces Victorian legislation with a new modern legal framework."

In September 2004 Cullen's successor, Environment Minister Dick Roche, also of Fianna Fáil, defended the proposed bill in Dáil Éireann. There he was faced with charges that the bill was a "Trojan horse to introduce privatisation and domestic water charges". The opposition also criticised the lack of a statutory right of access to water in the bill, lack of public participation in the review of proposed strategic plans, calling the bill "a thinly disguised attempt to privatise the water supply" as well as "a formula to get around the 1997 Act and re-introduce water charges by another name." Ultimately, the bill was not passed.

According to an unattributed opinion piece in the Irish Times, if the Water Services Bill, 2003, had been passed earlier and implemented effectively, people would not have had to boil their drinking water in Galway in 2007 because of an outbreak of cryptosporidiosis.

=== Water Services Act 2007 ===
In May 2007, the Fianna Fáil-Progressive Democrats coalition enacted the Water Services Act 2007. As well as updating and consolidating existing legislation, the Act introduced a system to regulate group water schemes, assigned the EPA with supervisory responsibilities, and placed duties of care on water services users regarding water conservation.

=== Fianna Fáil-Green Party government policy (2007–2011) ===
In 2008, the Minister for the Environment, John Gormley, Green Party leader and former Lord Mayor of Dublin from 1994 to 1995 during the water charges conflict, said that domestic water charges would not be introduced during the lifetime of the government. He also said water shortages would be a key issue that Ireland would have to grapple with in the future. The Minister said there were other ways of tackling potential shortages which have already left some larger urban areas – particularly Dublin – struggling to meet demand during prolonged dry spells. The main focus of government policy would be to reduce the leakages from main water supply pipes.

In October 2009, however, Fianna Fáil and the Green Party agreed on a Renewed Programme for Government, which pledged to introduce domestic water charges based on a system of a free allowance per household, with charges only on usage in excess of the allowance. In October 2010, the administration's 'National Recovery Plan 2010–2014' pledged that metering would form part of charges. Metering was to be introduced by 2014. As part of the EC-ECB-IMF Programme of Assistance to Ireland, agreed in November 2010, the Coalition agreed to the introduction of domestic water charges in 2012/2013.

=== Fine Gael-Labour government policy (2011–2015) ===
In March 2011, the new Fine Gael-Labour government's Programme for Government (2011–2016) contained commitments to a water policy similar to the previous government.

In January 2012, the Minister of Environment, Phil Hogan, announced a six-week consultation on a planned fundamental reform of the water sector. Following that, a metered domestic water charges would be introduced and a new public utility, Irish Water, would be established and take over responsibilities for drinking and waste water services from the local authorities. Independent economic regulation, through the Commission for Energy Regulation, would oversee the new utility's running costs, infrastructural investment plans and the design and level of domestic and non-domestic water charges.

In July 2013, Irish Water was legally established and began a national metering programme. The company was expected to initially install meters for approximately 1.05 million households. Domestic water charges were scheduled to commence in October 2014, with households receiving their first bills in Quarter 1 2015, with bills paid for usage in arrears. Irish Water would hence become the national water services authority, assuming all responsibilities for water services from local authorities - except for those relating to certain rural water services and inspections of wastewater treatment systems. Ireland's 34 local authorities were to continue to provide some drinking and waste water services on behalf of Irish Water through a service level agreement.

=== Irish Water (2015–present) ===
From 2015, Irish Water became responsible for providing water and wastewater services, with the intention that the company would be funded through direct billing. The new company was set up as a subsidiary of an existing semi-state corporation, Bord Gáis (Ervia). The newly created company took on the existing local authority employees and water management facilities, pipes and infrastructure. While Irish Water initially issued bills and was funded through payment from residential users, by 2017 the scale of protest and push-back against charges resulted in the suspension and ultimately scrapping of the funding model.
