= La Collette Power Station =

Power station on Jersey

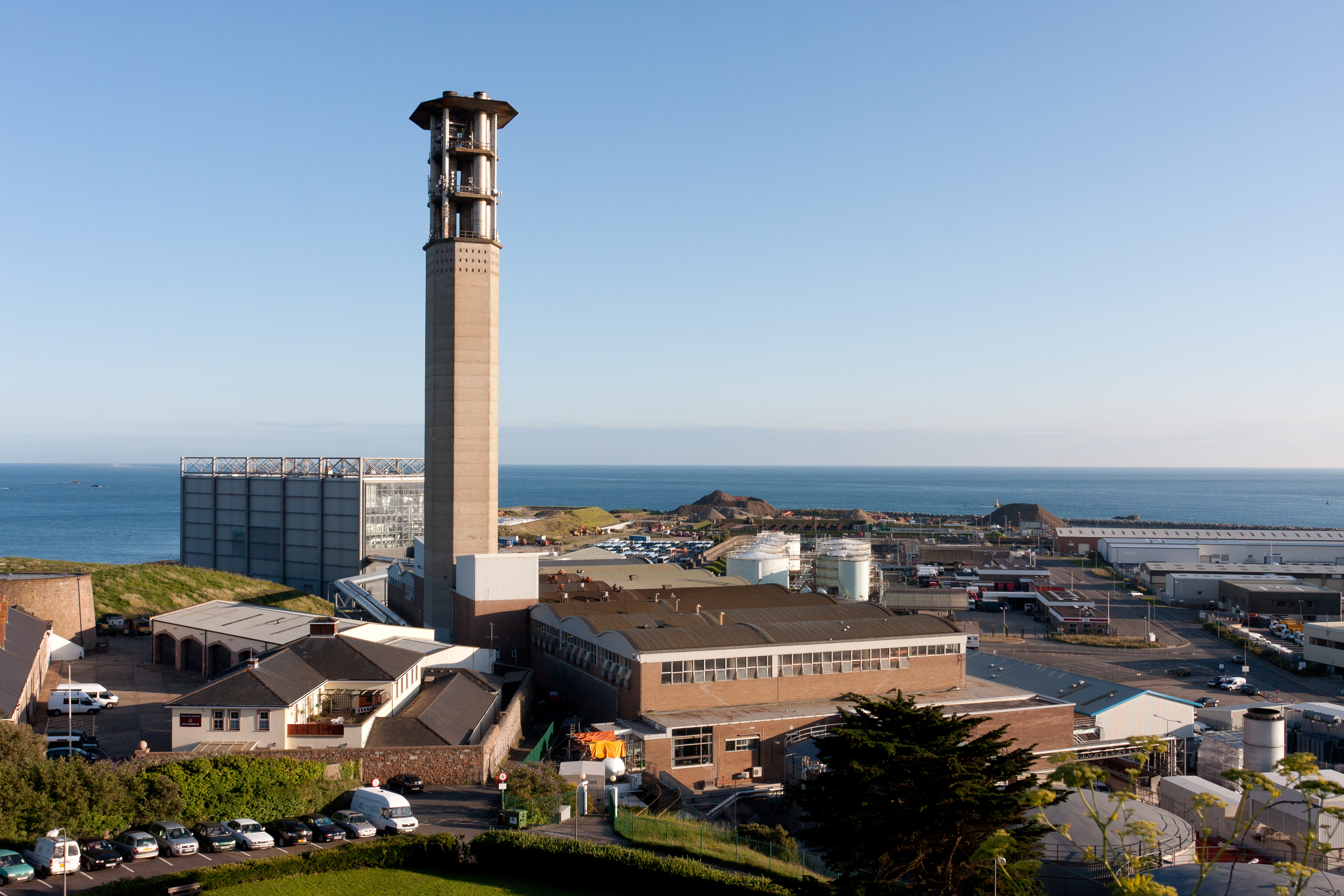
- La Collette Power Station in 2012
- Country: Jersey
- Location: St. Helier
- Coordinates: 49.1748°N 2.1088°W
- Status: In commission
- Commission date: 1965
- Operator: Jersey Electricity

Thermal power station
- Primary fuel: Oil Fired (HFO & Diesel)

Power generation
- Units operational: 4x Sulzer 16ZA40S diesel 3x Parsons steam turbine 1x Rolls-Royce Olympus
- Nameplate capacity: about 200 MW

External links
- Website: Jersey Electricity
- Commons: Related media on Commons

La Collette Power Station is the main power station for Jersey, and is now the main control centre for the Channel Islands Electricity Grid. It is operated by Jersey Electricity (JE). Under normal circumstances the power generation facilities served as an emergency supply in case of power interruption, however the failure of undersea cables in 2012 temporarily returned La Collette's role to full-time generation.

The States of Jersey's waste-to-energy incinerator was built next to La Collette and shares its water supply and chimney.

== History ==
The power station was commissioned in 1966 to relieve Queen’s Road, which by then was struggling to keep up with demand. It was initially based on Mirrlees diesel engines and Parsons steam turbines. In 1991 two Sulzer 16ZA40S diesel engines were installed replacing the older Mirrlees engines. In 2012 the last Mirrlees 5MW diesel engines were decommissioned and replaced by two newer and more efficient 11MW Sulzer engines.

In 1985 a 55MW supply cable to France was installed to access low carbon imported power. A second 90MW cable was installed in 2000. With the increase in imported power, parts of the La Collette plant were decommissioned. In 2012, the 1985 cable came to end of its working life and was taken out of service, La Collette was re-mobilised to full generating capacity to supplement the limited imports from just one interconnector for two and half years until September 2014 when the installation of a third cable to France restored full capacity and La Collette was once again stood down to standby mode.

The power station also supports the neighbouring energy-from-waste (EfW) plant since it opened in March 2011 by sharing its infrastructure with the government-owned facility. This includes two flues in the power station’s chimney, sea-water cooling, gas oil supply and storage facilities and, very importantly, water from a reverse-osmosis plant that produces the ultra-clean water necessary for use in the boilers to produce steam.

Up to 8MW of electricity produced by the EfW plant is sold back to Jersey Electricity and provides further diversification of generation sources.

== Specification ==
Based on figures in a JE leaflet the La Collette power station can produce around 79 MW.

La Collette power station contains:

- 4 Sulzer Diesel 16ZA40S engines producing 11 MW each (two installed 1991, two 2012)
- 1 Sulzer Diesel 8ZAL40S engine producing 5MW (installed 2018)
- 1 Rolls-Royce Olympus gas turbine producing 30 MW (installed 2003)

Two of the five Sulzer engines were bought second hand from Saudi Arabia in early 2012, and were installed as part of a £9 million deal.

== See also ==
Jersey Electricity Company
