= Jec =

JEC or Jec may refer to:

- Jabalpur Engineering College, located in Madhya Pradesh, India
- Jaipur Engineering College, located in Jaipur, Rajasthan
- James E. Cornette, a stage name for American professional wrestling manager Jim Cornette
- James Earl Carter (1924–2024), 39th president of the United States
- Jardine Engineering Corporation (JEC), an engineering corporation in Hong Kong, a member of Jardine Matheson Group
- Jersey Electricity Company, in Jersey, Channel Islands
- Jeunesse Etudiante Chrétienne, a worldwide group of young Christian students
- Jewish Educational Center, in New Jersey
- João Emanuel Carneiro, a popular Brazilian screenwriter and film director
- Joinville Esporte Clube, football club in Brazil
- Jonsson Engineering Center, in New York State
- Jorhat Engineering College, in India
- Junta Electoral Central, the Spanish election overseer
