= United Kingdom–Ireland natural gas interconnectors =

The United Kingdom, Ireland and the Isle of Man are interconnected by five subsea and overland gas pipelines. These provide facilities for the transfer of natural gas from sources in Scotland and England to consumers in Northern Ireland, the Republic of Ireland, and the Isle of Man.

== Background ==
The Republic of Ireland had a supply of natural gas from the Kinsale Head offshore field which was in production from 1978 to 2020. As production declined so further sources of natural gas were identified and assessed. One approach was to abstract gas from the British National Grid’s National Transmission System (NTS) in Scotland. The NTS is fed from gas fields on the UK Continental Shelf; from Europe (Belgium, the Netherlands and Norway); and as Liquid Natural Gas (LNG) obtained internationally.

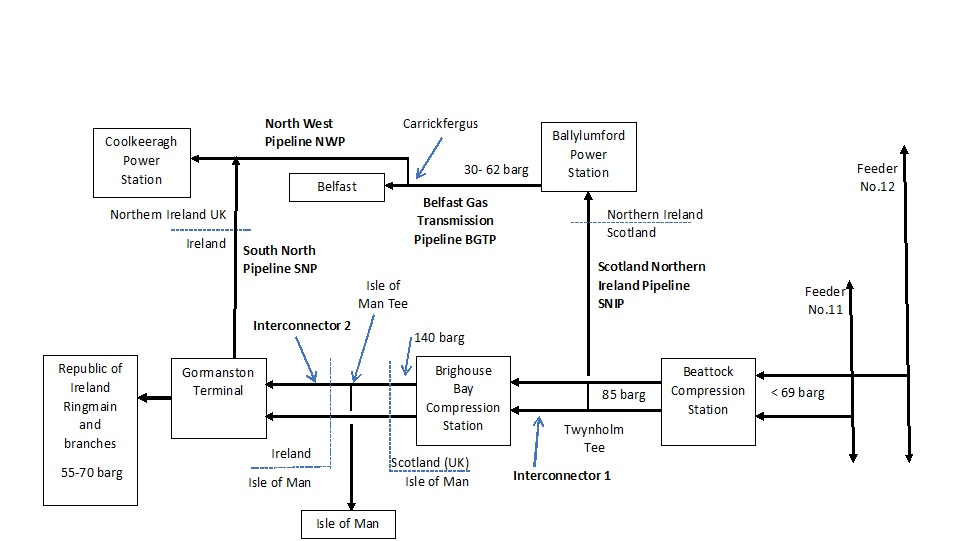
Gas interconnectors 1

== The interconnectors ==
=== Interconnector No.1 ===
The earliest interconnector (designated Interconnector No.1) was commissioned in 1991. The NTS take-off point is from the No. 11 and No. 12 Feeders at the Beattock Compressor Station north of Moffat, Scotland. From the take-off point gas is routed to a compressor station where the gas pressure is raised to 85 bars (1200 psi). A 36-inch diameter buried overland pipeline transports the gas to Brighouse Bay on the coast. The Brighouse compressor station raises the gas pressure to 140 bars (2000 psi). Gas is routed through a 24-inch diameter, 162 km (100 mile) long subsea pipeline to Gormanston, Co. Meath, Ireland where controls feed gas into the Irish gas distribution system.

=== SNIP ===
The second interconnector is the Scotland to Northern Ireland Pipeline (SNIP). Gas is taken from a Tee in the Beattock to Brighouse Bay pipeline at Twynholm. The 24-inch diameter pipeline is routed overland to Stranraer and then subsea to Ballylumford power station Northern Ireland. SNIP is 85 miles (135 km) long and was commissioned in 1996. From Ballylumford a pipeline continues as the 24-inch diameter 20 mile (35 km) long Belfast Gas Transmission Pipeline (BGTP) to Belfast via Carrickfergus. The 18-inch diameter 70 mile (112 km) long North-West Pipeline (NWP) connects to the BGTP at Carrickfergus and extends to Coolkeeragh power station. The NWP has take-offs to pressure reduction stations at Ballymena, Coleraine, Maydown and Derry.

=== Interconnector No.2 ===
The third interconnector (designated Interconnector No.2) were commissioned in 2003. The new system comprised a second compressor station at Beattock, a second overland pipeline, and an extension to the compressor at Brighouse. The latter feeds gas into a 30-inch diameter 120 mile (192 km) long subsea pipeline to Gormanston, where it supplies gas for the Irish gas system.

=== IOMS ===
At its nearest point Interconnector No.2 is 6¾ miles (11 km) from the Isle of Man. This gave an opportunity to provide a gas supply to the Isle of Man. A 10-inch Tee on the Interconnector and a 10-inch subsea spur (Isle of Man Spur, IOMS) pipeline which supplies gas to the Glen Mooar Above Ground Installation (AGI) on Isle of Man. Gas is transferred to the Pulrose power station near Douglas. Several districts are provided with a supply of natural gas.

=== SNP ===
The fifth interconnector is a 156 km (97 mile) long overland cross border pipeline from the Republic of Ireland to Northern Ireland. This is called the South North Pipeline (SNP) and was commissioned in 2006. At Gormanston there is a connection between IC2 and the southern end of the SNP. The northern end of SNP is connected to the NWP 7½ miles (12 km) west of Carrickfergus. The SNP has take-offs to pressure reduction stations at Newry, Banbridge, Derryhale, Lisburn and Belfast.

The key parameters of the interconnecting pipelines are summarised in the table.

Interconnected pipelines: Scotland, Ireland, Northern Ireland and the Isle of Man
Pipeline Name	Interconnector Scotland to Ireland IC1	Scotland to Northern Ireland Pipeline (SNIP)	Interconnector 2 Scotland to Ireland IC2	Isle of Man Spur (IOMS)	South North Pipeline (SNP)	Belfast Gas Transmission Pipeline (BGTP)	North-West Pipeline (N-WP)
Owner	Gas Networks Ireland	Mutual Energy Limited	Gas Networks Ireland	Gas Networks Ireland	Gas Networks Ireland	Belfast Gas Transmission Limited	BGE Northern Ireland
Oil & Gas Authority (OGA) Pipeline Number	PL938	PL982	PL1890	–	–	–	–
Start	Moffat / Beattock	Twynholm	Moffat / Beattock	IC2 Tee	IC2	Ballylumford	Carrickfergus
End	Gormanston	Ballylumford power station, Islandmagee	Gormanston	Glen Mooar AGI	North-West Pipeline (NWP)	Belfast	Coolkeeragh power station
Length, km	203.897	135	192.205	11.687	156	35	112
Diameter, mm	609	609	762	273	450	600	450
Nominal diameter, inches	24	24	30	10	18	24	18
Maximum operating pressure, bar	Beattock to Brighouse 85 bar (1200 psi), subsea 140 bar (2000 psi)	75	146	146	75	75	75
Commissioned	6/1/1991	1996	1/1/2003	1/1/2003	10/2006	1996	

== Gas export and import ==
Gas exported from the United Kingdom to the Republic of Ireland (in GWh)
Gas exported from the United Kingdom to the Isle of Man (in GWh)

== See also ==
- National Transmission System
- Isle of Man gas industry
- Oil and gas industry in the United Kingdom
- Energy in Ireland
- Ervia
