= Isle of Man Water and Sewerage Authority =

Isle of Man Water and Sewerage Authority Lught-reill Ushtey as Sornaigys Ellan Vannin
- Company type: Public Authority
- Industry: Water supply Sewerage
- Founded: 1972
- Headquarters: Douglas, Isle of Man
- Area served: Isle of Man
- Key people: Peter Winstanley (CEO); John Houghton MHK (Chairman)
- Parent: Isle of Man Government
- Website: http://www.gov.im/water

The Isle of Man Water and Sewerage Authority (Manx: Lught-reill Ushtey as Sornaigys Ellan Vannin) was the statutory board responsible for water supply and sewage disposal in the Isle of Man. It was formed in 1972 as the 'Isle of Man Water Authority' by the merger of the Isle of Man Water Board and the Water Department of Douglas Corporation. In 1974 it took over the gas production and distribution functions of the Isle of Man Gas Authority, and was renamed the 'Isle of Man Water and Gas Authority'. In 1985 the gas undertaking was privatised, and the authority reverted to its original title. It was renamed the 'Isle of Man Water and Sewerage Authority' in 2010, taking over the sewerage responsibilities of the former Department of Transport.

In 2014 it became part of the Manx Utilities Authority when it was merged with the Manx Electricity Authority.

== Distribution system ==
The water supply system starts with four impounding reservoirs (operational out of seven owned by the authority) located in the uplands of the Isle of Man, the first of which was constructed in 1875, and the most recent, Sulby Reservoir, in 1982. Together they hold thousands of millions of gallons.

Water is then distributed via gravity through 66 kilometres (41 mi) of large diameter mains to one of the treatment plants, either at Sulby (opened in October 2005) or Douglas (opened in February 2008).

From the treatment centres, the water then flows to 33 underground service reservoirs. Gravity or one of thirteen pumping stations then take the water to its end-users. There are over 1,400 kilometres (870 mi) of treated water mains.

== Chairmen ==
- John Houghton MHK, 2012–present
- Graham Cregeen MHK, 2011–12
- Tim Crookall MHK, 2009–11
- David Cannan MHK, 2007–09
- Unknown, 2006–07
- Martyn Quayle MHK, 2004–06
- Brenda Cannell MHK, 2002–04
- David Cannan MHK, 2003–04
- Peter Karran MHK, 1990–2003
- Adrian Duggan MHK, 1986–90
- David Martin MHK, 1984–86
- Unknown, pre 1984
