= David Cannan =

Manx politician (1936–2022)

John David Qualtrough Cannan MHK (24 August, 1936 – 2022) was the Member of the House of Keys for Michael and Chairman of the Isle of Man Water Authority. He was the son of former Chaplain of the House of Keys, Rev Canon Charles Cannan. He was educated at King William's College and was a businessman in the tea and rubber industry before going into politics. In the 1970s he was a Conservative Party councillor in England before returning to the Isle of Man and becoming the Michael MHK in 1982. He was elected Speaker of the House of Keys in 2000, and remained as such until the 2001 General Election. He retired from the House of Keys at the 2011 General Election.

In 2006 he stood for Chief Minister of the Isle of Man, and then Speaker, but was unsuccessful in both.

Cannan was known to be a supporter of the British Crown in general and was against the move to rename the Lieutenant Governor to Crown Commissioner.

In 2021 Cannan’s son Alfred Cannan was elected as Chief Minister of the Isle of Man. David Cannan's death was announced on 1 August 2022.

== Governmental positions ==
- Minister of the Treasury, 1986–89
- Chairman of the Financial Supervision Commission, 1987–89
- Chairman of Isle of Man Water and Sewerage Authority, 2007–?
