= Manx Electricity Authority =

Manx Electricity Authority Lught-reill Lectraghys Manninagh
- Company type: State utility board
- Industry: Energy: electricity
- Predecessor: Douglas Corporation Electricity Department and Isle of Man Electricity Board
- Founded: 1984
- Defunct: 2014
- Fate: Merged with Isle of Man Water and Sewerage Authority
- Successor: Manx Utilities Authority
- Headquarters: Douglas, Isle of Man
- Area served: Isle of Man
- Key people: Philip King (CEO); Edmund Lowey MLC (Chairman)
- Products: Electric power
- Total assets: Power stations at Pulrose, Peel, Ramsey and Sulby
- Owner: Isle of Man Government
- Parent: Isle of Man Government
- Subsidiaries: e-llan Communication; ManxCable Company Ltd.

The Manx Electricity Authority (Manx: Lught-reill Lectraghys Manninagh) was a statutory board of the Isle of Man Government which generated and supplied electricity for the Isle of Man. In 2014 it became part of the Manx Utilities Authority when it was merged with the Isle of Man Water and Sewerage Authority.

== History ==
=== Douglas Corporation Electricity ===
Following the First World War the development of utilities on the Isle of Man was considered essential. To meet the demand for electricity in the Douglas area Tynwald considered whether this should be met by a subsidiary of the Douglas Gas Company or by the Douglas Corporation. In 1921 the Corporation of Douglas was granted monopoly powers to establish an electric light and power works under the provisions of the Douglas Corporation Electric Light and Power Act 1921. Electricity supplies started in June 1923. Authorised distribution covered an area of 17 square miles, including Douglas, Onchan, Union Mills, Tromode, and Groudie, and served a population of about 25,000.

=== Isle of Man Electricity Board ===
An Electricity Commission in 1929 considered how to extend the supply of electricity across the island. The commission proposed that a private company should distribute electricity purchased from Douglas Corporation. The Isle of Man Electric Light and Power Act 1932 as amended by the Isle of Man Electric Light and Power Amendment Act 1935 established the Isle of Man Electricity Board with the authority to supply electricity throughout the Isle of Man but excluding Douglas and the Howstrake Estate. The authorised distribution area covered 280 square miles, including Ramsey, Peel, Port Erin, Castletown and about 36 villages and rural districts and served a population of 25,000. Electricity supplies commenced on 3 August 1935. The Douglas Corporation and the Isle of Man Electricity Board were the sole suppliers on the island, apart from small areas supplied by the Manx Electric Railway Company.

=== Douglas Corporation generation ===
==== Pulrose power station ====
By the mid-1950s the Pulrose power station of the Douglas Corporation had a total generating capacity of 15.475 MW. This comprised the following plant:

Coal-fired boilers:

- 2 × 15,000 pounds per hour (1.89 kg/s) Nesdrum, operating at 220 psi (15.2 bar)
- 2 × 44,000 lb/hr (5.54 kg/s) Nesdrum, 220 psi
- 1 × 22,000 lb/hr (2.77 kg/s) Stirling, 220 psi
- 2 × 60,000 lb/hr (7.56 kg/s) John Thompson, 450 psi (31.0 bar)

Turbo-alternators:

- 1 × 1,875 kW Brush-Ljungstrom
- 1 × 1,100 kW Richardsons Westgarth Brown Bovey
- 1 × 3,750 kW Richardsons Westgarth Brown Bovey
- 1 × 3,750 kW Bellis and Morcon
- 1 × 5,000 kW Brush-Ljungstrom

There were 90 transformer sub-stations with a capacity of 18.5 MVA. A summary of electricity supplies in the mid-1950s is shown in the table.

Douglas Corporation electricity supplies
Year	Customers	Electricity supplied, GWh	Revenue from electricity sales
1954	9,385	19.691	£202,183
1955	9,568	21.873	£228,767
1956	9,641	23.550	£238,087
1957	9,701	24.333	£251,874
1958	9,747	25.673	£372,598

=== Isle of Man Electricity Board generation ===
In the mid-1950s the Isle of Man Electricity Board generated electricity using diesel engines. There were seven 920 kW and two 2,000 kW Mirrlees engines, driving alternators generating electricity at 11 kV. High tension transmission was at 11/33 kV, and supplied to consumers at 400 V for power and 230 V single phase for lighting. A summary of electricity supplies in the mid-1950s is shown in the table.

Isle of Man Electricity Board electricity supplies
Year	Customers	Electricity supplied, GWh	Revenue from electricity sales
1954		16.619	£165,488
1955		17.027	£169,946
1956		18.279	£177,739
1957		20.454	£198,137
1958	10,108	22.335	£221,874

== Manx Electricity Authority ==
In 1982 Tynwald appointed a commission to examine the amalgamation of the Douglas Corporation Electricity Department and Isle of Man Electricity Board. The commission reported in May 1983 in favour of the establishment of a single authority for the whole island. The Manx Electricity Authority was established in July 1983 to develop and maintain an efficient and economical system of electricity supply for the Island. Its legal position was established by the Electricity Act 1984.

In 2014 the Manx Electricity Authority became part of the Manx Utilities Authority when it was merged with the Isle of Man Water and Sewerage Authority.

=== Generation ===
Electricity generation is provided on the island from the following sources

- A 1 MW hydroelectric power plant at Sulby and Block Eary reservoir.
- An 87 MW combined cycle gas turbine (natural gas fired) power station in Douglas.
- A number of diesel generators at Douglas (Pulrose 'D' 48 MW), Peel (40 MW), and Ramsey (3.6 MW), totalling 90.4 MW.

In addition there is also the Isle of Man to England Interconnector, an AC submarine power cable connecting the transmission system of the Isle of Man to that of Great Britain.

== See also ==
- Isle of Man to England Interconnector
- List of power stations in the British Crown Dependencies
- Manx Utilities Authority
