= World Forum on Energy Regulation =

The World Forum on Energy Regulation (WFER) is the leading international conference on energy regulation, held once every three years. WFER IV is hosted by the Council of European Energy Regulators CEER and the Greek Regulator. WFER IV will be held in Athens, Greece, from 18 to 21 October 2009. It builds on the themes and key findings of the past three World Fora, held in 2000 (Montreal) 2003 (Rome) and 2006 (Washington).

== 2009 ==
The WFER IV will provide a global conference and networking opportunity attended by more than 700 presidents and CEOs from the energy industry, government and international institution officials, high-level policy makers, academics and regulators from over 60 countries.

Among others, the three-day programme of WFER IV features numerous break-out sessions across four key themes:

- Reliability and security of supply
- The role of regulators in responding to climate change
- Competitiveness and affordability
- The independence, powers, responsibilities, best practices and training of regulators

Distinguished chairpersons and speakers include:

- A. Piebalgs, European Union Energy Commissioner
- D. Dobbeni, President of EU Transmission System Operators
- l. Josefsson, President of Eurelectric and Vattenfall
- S. Littlechild, University of Birmingham and University of Cambridge
- M. Monti, former EU Commissioner for Competition
- Heads of the energy regulators in Europe (J. Mogg), Eastern Europe (G. Szorenyi), Russia (S. Novikov), United States (F. Butler), Canada (P. Gurnham), Africa (S. Mokoena), India (P. Deo) and Australia (J. Tamblyn) and many more.....

== See also ==
- Commission for Energy Regulation
- Energy law
