= Manx Utilities Authority =

Manx governmental unit

- Trade name: Manx Utilities
- Native name: Bun Shirveishyn Vannin
- Industry: Electricity, Natural Gas, Water, Wastewater
- Predecessor: Manx Electricity Authority and the Isle of Man Water and Sewerage Authority
- Founded: April 2014
- Headquarters: Douglas, Isle of Man
- Area served: Isle of Man
- Key people: Peter Reid MLC (interim Chair), Philip King (Chief Executive)
- Production output: see text
- Services: Electricity, Water, Natural Gas, Sewage treatment
- Revenue: £100 million (turnover)
- Parent: Isle of Man Government
- Website: https://www.manxutilities.im

The Manx Utilities Authority (Manx: Bun Shirveishyn Vannin) is a Statutory Board of the Isle of Man Government which provides utilities for the Isle of Man. It was created in 2014 by the merging of the Manx Electricity Authority with the Isle of Man Water and Sewerage Authority.

== History ==
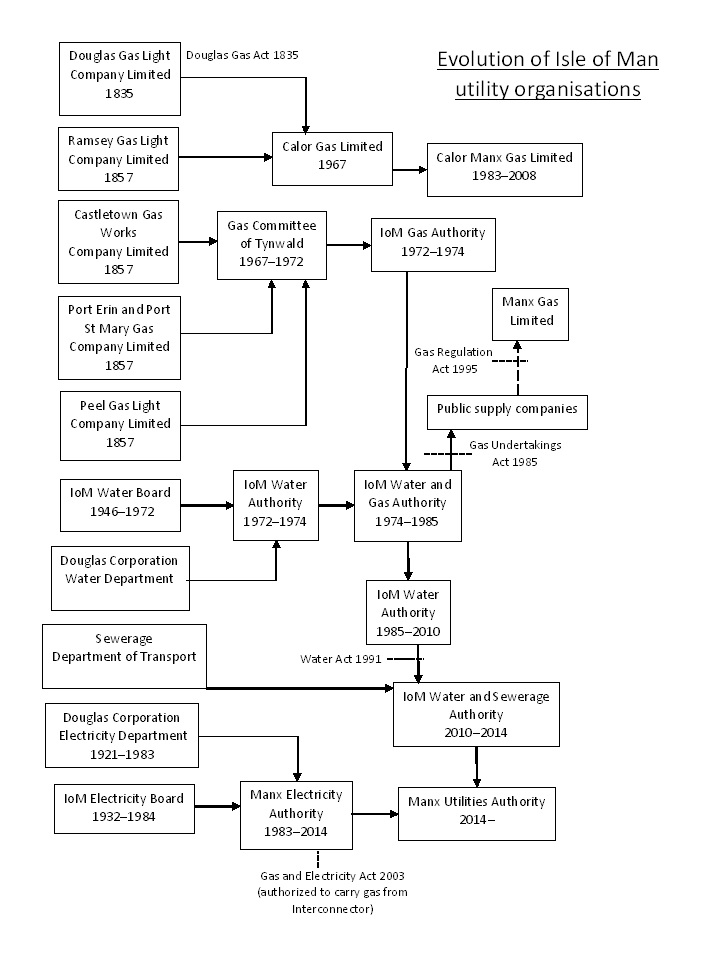
Evolution of Manx utility organisations

The public utilities on the Isle of Man were the responsibility of a range of organisations; over time they assumed the remit of, or were merged with, or demerged from, other bodies. These historic changes are summarised as follows and are depicted on the diagram.

- The Manx Electricity Authority was established in July 1983 to develop and maintain an efficient and economical system of electricity supply for the Island. Its legal position was established by the Electricity Act 1984.
  - The Manx Electricity Authority was constituted by the merger of the Isle of Man Electricity Board (1932–1984) and the Electricity Department of the Douglas Corporation (1921–1983).
  - The Manx Electricity Authority only had responsibility for the supply of electricity. These responsibilities were extended in 2003 to include the supply of gas. This was in conjunction with the construction of high pressure natural gas import system from the UK-Ireland gas interconnector. The Gas and Electricity Act 2003 empowered the Manx Electricity Authority to supply gas, and to construct pipes and associated apparatus (Section 1); it also had the duty to supply gas to other organisations such as public gas suppliers (Section2).
- The Isle of Man Water Authority, was established in 1972 by the merger of the Isle of Man Water Board (1946–1972) and the Water Department of Douglas Corporation
  - In 1974 it assumed the gas production and distribution functions of the Isle of Man Gas Authority, and was renamed the Isle of Man Water and Gas Authority.
  - The IoM Gas Authority (1972–1974) had assumed the responsibilities of the Gas Committee of the Tynwald (1967–1972), which in turn had assumed ownership of the Castletown, Peel and the Port St Mary gas undertakings in 1967. The Douglas and Ramsey gas undertakings were taken over by Calor Gas in 1967.
  - In 1985 the gas undertaking was privatised, and the authority reverted to its previous title.
  - In 2010 it assumed the sewerage responsibilities of the former Department of Transport and was renamed the Isle of Man Water and Sewerage Authority.
- In 2014 the Manx Electricity Authority merged with the Isle of Man Water and Sewerage Authority to establish the Manx Utilities Authority.

== Responsibilities ==
The authority is responsible for providing customers with safe, reliable, efficient and economic supplies of electricity, natural gas and clean water; as well as processing waste water. Manx Utilities has two subsidiary businesses on commercial telecommunications and subsea cable management.

=== Electricity ===
Manx Utilities Authority is responsible for the generation, transmission and distribution of electricity on the island. It also exports electricity to the British National Grid as required through the Isle of Man to England Interconnector. The authority owns and operates three power stations:

- Pulrose power station
- Sulby hydroelectric power station
- Peel power station

The authority is responsible for 540 km of overhead power lines and 1,380 km of underground cable.

Key electricity data is summarised in the table:

Key electricity data
Year	2014/5	2015/6	2016/7	2017/8	2018/9	2019/20	2020/1
Electricity to homes and businesses, GWh	368	367	362	363	362	363	351
Electricity to the UK, GWh	93	87	105	95	131	192	168
Green electricity generated, GWh	2.8	4.2	2.9	3.8	2.4	3.2	3.5
Electricity generated at Pulrose, GWh			500	434	454	542	514
Revenue from electricity sold to the UK, £	£1.8m	£3.2m	£4.6m	£3.2m	£3.4m	£4.3m	£3.8m

=== Natural gas ===
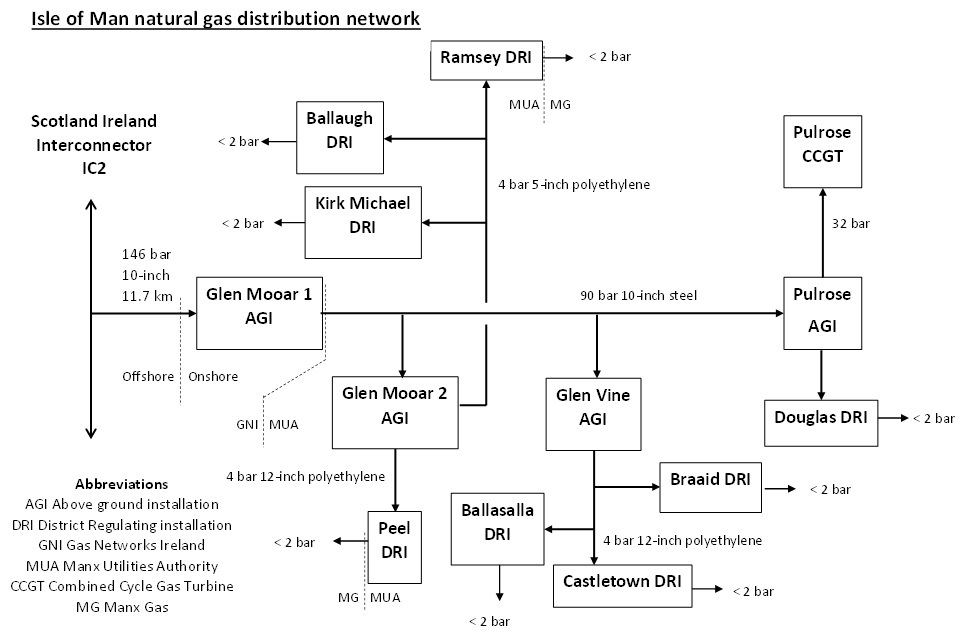
Manx natural gas distribution

The authority owns and operates the onshore high pressure natural gas transmission and distribution network from the Scotland to Ireland gas interconnector: see diagram. It manages 55 km of gas pipelines, Manx Gas is responsible for the low pressure (<2 bar) local distribution systems.

Key gas data is summarised in the table:

Key gas supply data
Year	2014/5	2015/6	2016/7	2017/8	2018/9	2019/20	2020/1
Gas delivered to Manx Gas, therms	10	10	11	11	10	10.9	10
Gas used for power generation, therms	34	30	35	34	34	40.8	39.5

=== Water ===
The Manx Utility Authority has the responsibility to provide clear drinking water by collecting, treating, storing and distributing fresh potable water.

The authority's water infrastructure includes:

- 4 impounding reservoirs
- 2 water treatment works (Sulby and Douglas)
- 20 pumping stations
- 27 service reservoirs
- 1,800 kilometres of water mains
- 55,000 connections

Throughput:

- Annual production 10,000 megalitres of water per year.
- Summer production 35 megalitres of water per day
- Winter production 29 megalitres of water per day

=== Sewerage ===
The Manx Utility Authority's responsibility is to manage, maintain and develop the Island's sewerage infrastructure and the sewage treatment and disposal systems.

The authority's sewerage infrastructure includes:

- Integration and Recycling of the Island's Sewage (IRIS) infrastructure
- Regional Sewage Treatment Strategy (RSTS) infrastructure
- Meary Veg wastewater facility
- 76 pumping stations
- Tanker fleet
- 18 sewage treatment works
- 600 km of sewer

Throughput:

- 10,000 megalitres of waste water (sewage) per year
- 1,000 tonnes of sludge pellets are produced annually
- 1,400 septic tanks are emptied annually

=== Flood risk ===
The authority formerly had responsibility for flood risk management. From November 2020 this function was transferred to the Department of Infrastructure (DOI). A Flood Management Division was established, which is responsible for Flood Risk Management.

=== Subsidiaries ===
Manx Utilities has two subsidiaries

- e-llan Communications Limited
  - e-llan Communications Ltd provides high bandwidth communication facilities over a fibre optic cable. The cable is buried under the seabed alongside the UK - IOM interconnector power cable.
- Manx Cable Company Limited
  - Manx Cable Company Limited operates and maintains the 40 MW 90 kV electrical interconnector subsea cable between the Isle of Man and the UK.

== See also ==
- List of power stations in the British Crown Dependencies
- Isle of Man gas industry
- Isle of Man to England Interconnector
