= List of power stations in the Crown Dependencies =

This is a list of current and former electricity-generating power stations in the British Crown Dependencies. The Crown Dependencies are the Bailiwick of Jersey, the Bailiwick of Guernsey and the Isle of Man. They are British Islands but are not part of the United Kingdom.

Name	Location	Coordinates	Crown Dependency	Type	Capacity	Operator	Opened	Status	Notes
Albert Pier	Saint Helier, Jersey	49°10'37"N 2°06'51"W	Jersey	Diesel engines		Jersey Electricity Company Limited	1925	Closed after 1959	
La Collette	Saint Helier, Jersey	49°10'29"N 2°06'34"W	Jersey	Diesel engines, gas turbine, steam turbines	80 MW (1970), 110 MW (1972), 45 MW extension 1994, 200 MW	Jersey Electricity Company Limited until 2010, Jersey Electricity plc	1965	Operational	
Queen's Road	Queen's Road, Saint Helier, Jersey	49°11'60"N 2°06'54"W	Jersey	Formerly Diesel engines, Gas turbines (Rolls-Royce Olympus)	17.88 MW (1955), 26.47 MW (1959), 40 MW (1962), 2 × 17 MW gas turbines (1988)	Jersey Electricity Company Limited	1934	Operational	Jersey Electricity administrative headquarters
Alderney	York Hill, Alderney		Guernsey	6 × Diesel engines (1959)	590 kW (1959)	Guernsey Electricity Department (1949–52)	1934	Closed after 1959	Formerly operated by Alderney Light & Power Company Limited (1939–49).
Alderney	Route de Crabby, Alderney	49°43'20"N 2°12'10"W	Guernsey	Oil-fired engines	3 × 2 MW, 2 × 750 kW, 2 × 450 kW	Alderney Electricity Limited (1979-)	1952	Operational	Formerly operated by Christy Bros. Ltd (1952–79). Units sold 821,501 kWh (1959), 900,254 kWh (1960); consumers 590 (1959), 610 (1960).
Les Amballes	Saint Peter Port, Guernsey		Guernsey	Steam	0.15 MW (1900)	Guernsey States Electricity Board (1933–93)	1898	Closed before 1959	Formerly operated by Edmundson's Electricity Corporation (1900–07), Guernsey Electric Light and Power Company Limited (1907–33)
Vale	St. Sampson's, North Quay, Guernsey	49°29'07"N 2°31'04"W	Guernsey	Diesel engines, steam turbines, oil-fired gas turbines	0.87 MW (1902), 13.99 MW (1959), 72 MW (1984)	Guernsey Electricity (1993-)	1903	Operational	Formerly operated by Edmundson's Electricity Corporation (1900–07), Guernsey Electric Light and Power Company Limited (1907–33), the Guernsey States Electricity Board (1933–93) B station opened 1970
Powerhouse	Herm	49°28'11"N 2°27'11"W	Guernsey	3 Diesel engines	80–180 kW	Herm Island		Operational	
Sark	Sark		Guernsey	Diesel engine	2 × 5 kW, 1 × 7 kW, 2 × 12 kW, 1 × 22 kW (1956)	Sark Electricity Limited (1997-)	1948	Operational	Formerly operated by Robson Electric Supply Company (1948–69), Sark Electric Supply Company (1969–97)
Isle of Man Energy from Waste	Richmond Hill, Isle of Man	54°8'32"N 4°31'50"W	Isle of Man	Refuse boiler, steam turbo-alternator	5.5 MW	Suez	2004	Operational	Also known as Isle of Man Incinerator
Peel	Peel, Isle of Man	54°13'09"N 4°41'58"W	Isle of Man	Diesel engine	40 MW	Manx Utilities	1995	Operational	Operated by Manx Electricity Authority until 2014
Pulrose	Douglas, Isle of Man	54°09'02"N 4°30'07"W	Isle of Man	Steam turbo-alternator	15.475 MW	Douglas Corporation	1923	Closed	
Isle of Man Electricity Board	Douglas, Isle of Man		Isle of Man	Diesel engines	7 × 920 kW + 2 × 2 MW	Isle of Man Electricity Board	1933	Closed	Supply outside of Douglas
Pulrose	Douglas, Isle of Man	54°09'02"N 4°30'07"W	Isle of Man	Gas-fired CCGT, steam	64 MW (CCGT) 23 MW (steam)	Manx Utilities	1998, 2003	Operational	Manx Electricity Authority until 2014
Ramsey	Ramsey, Isle of Man	54°19'29"N 4°22'54"W	Isle of Man	Diesel engine	3.6 MW	Manx Utilities	1993	Operational	Manx Electricity Authority until 2014
Sulby	Sulby reservoir, Isle of Man	54°16'17"N 4°30'06"W	Isle of Man	Hydro electric	1.2 MW	Manx Utilities	1982	Operational	Manx Electricity Authority until 2014

In addition to the generation of electricity at operational stations, there are several sub-sea cables that connect to these power stations to the United Kingdom and France. They include the Isle of Man to England Interconnector and the Channel Islands Electricity Grid.

== See also ==
- Jersey Electricity Company
- Guernsey Electricity
- Channel Islands Electricity Grid
- Manx Utilities
- List of power stations in England
- List of power stations in Scotland
- List of power stations in Wales
- List of power stations in Northern Ireland
- List of power stations in France
