= Irish Water =

State company operating water services in Ireland

Uisce Éireann
- Type: Public utility
- Industry: Water industry
- Founded: 27 July 2013 (registered as a company)
- Headquarters: Colvill House, 24–26 Talbot Street, Dublin, Ireland
- Area served: Ireland
- Key people: Niall Gleeson (Managing Director)
- Website: www.water.ie

Uisce Éireann (/ˈɪʃkə/ ISH-kuh /ˈɛərən/AIR-un, Irish: [ˈɪʃkə ˈeːɾˠən̪ˠ]), formerly and commonly known as Irish Water, is a state-owned water utility company in Ireland. It was created by the Irish Government in 2013 as a subsidiary of Bord Gáis. Water and wastewater services were previously provided by local authorities in Ireland. The company was renamed Uisce Éireann on 31 December 2022. On 1 January 2023, the company was split from its former parent body Ervia, becoming a standalone national utility for water services.

The organisation is accountable to two regulatory bodies, the Commission for Regulation of Utilities (CRU), the economic regulator for the water industry, and the Environmental Protection Agency (EPA), the environmental regulator.

== Formation and operation ==
Water supply and sanitation in Ireland are governed by the Water Services Acts of 2007 to 2014. Until 2015, this legislation provided for the provision of water and wastewater services by local authorities, with domestic usage funded through central taxation, and non-domestic usage funded via local authority rates.

In 2013, Irish Water was established under the Water Services Act 2013, which created the company as a subsidiary company of Bord Gáis. to provide "safe, clean and affordable water and waste water services" to water users in the country. Under terms of a 2010 Economic Adjustment (Bailout) Programme, the government agreed to change this arrangement. From 2015, legislation came into force such that Uisce Éireann became responsible for providing water and wastewater services, with the intention that the company would be funded through direct billing. The new company was set up as a subsidiary of an existing semi-state corporation, Bord Gáis (Ervia). The newly created company effectively took on the existing local authority employees and water management facilities, pipes and infrastructure. Operationally, Uisce Éireann delegates some work, for example water meter installation and customer support, to sub-contractors.

Public concerns on operational, documentation, company responsiveness, data security, financial and perceived wasteful spending issues were highlighted throughout the initial months of Uisce Éireann's operations. Together with privatisation fears, these public concerns resulted in a significant volume of unreturned application forms, large nationwide protests and pressure on company management and the government during 2014. In 2015, the scale of non-payment issues, and an unfavourable assessment of the viability of the organisation as an independent entity further increased attention and calls by some to dissolve the organisation. The viability of the utility was also a feature ahead of the 2016 general election, and post-election discussions on government formation.

Uisce Éireann is responsible for the maintenance and repair of Ireland's water supply infrastructure. It has also been tasked with refurbishing the water supply, including addressing leaks and replacing old infrastructure,, and with ensuring an adequate water supply for Ireland's growing population.

In July 2022, it was announced that the company would be renamed from Irish Water to Uisce Éireann as part of a split from its parent body Ervia. This took effect from 1 January 2023.

== Litigation and criticism ==
The company has been the subject of several civil cases, including one taken by Crohn's Disease sufferer Elizabeth Hourihane, and one taken by the Environmental Protection Agency (EPA) which initiated proceedings over the standard of water in County Donegal.

In 2014 and 2015, local protests were encouraged by residents across the country, and supported by Sinn Féin, Socialist Party, Socialist Workers Party, Éirígí, Republican Sinn Féin, 32 County Sovereignty Movement, Communist Party of Ireland, Workers' Party, Workers Solidarity Movement, Direct Democracy Ireland along with trade unionists and other civil society organisations. Those opposed to the plans physically blocked the installation of water meters and demonstrated against the introduction of water charges. A demonstration that took place in Dublin on 11 October 2014 involved over 50,000 people. The Irish Times newspaper conducted a poll the week before which found that 33% of people intended to boycott water charges. Also on 11 October, Paul Murphy, an anti-austerity candidate, won the 2014 Dublin South-West by-election. Writing in The New York Times on 11 October 2014, Fintan O'Toole described this as the "Water Rebellion". Further demonstrations took place in key provincial towns and cities in November 2014, and on 10 December 2014 approximately 100,000 people protested in Dublin against water charges, with the Gardaí setting up barricades to establish an exclusion zone around government buildings. In response, protestors blockaded roads and bridges in the city centre, delaying bus services, until the early hours of the next morning. Community groups set up to oppose water meters also reportedly physically removed water meters in the days after the protest.

The utility and associated charges were also a feature in the 2016 general election, with a number of parties and candidates campaigning specifically on the issue.

Water charges were suspended in the months following the election, and an "expert commission on the funding of water services" established to assess the issue. The commission published a report on 29 November 2016 which recommended that normal household water usage should be paid for by the State, with excessive usage paid for by the consumer on the polluter pays principle.

In November 2025, Uisce Éireann was fined for failing to meet targets for addressing leaks in the water infrastructure.
