= Channel Islands Electricity Grid =

The Channel Islands Electricity Grid (CIEG) is the joint company set up in 1998 between Guernsey Electricity and Jersey Electricity to operate and manage the submarine cables between mainland Europe and the Channel Islands.

The grid physically comprises a network of high voltage (90 kV, 3-phase, 50 Hz) submarine and underground cables linking the French electricity grid to the electricity systems on the islands of Jersey and Guernsey. The grid enables electricity generated from renewable sources in France to be transmitted to Jersey and Guernsey.

== Development ==
The CIEG is continuing to develop the undersea cable network with additional subsea cables between the islands and France being devised to give both Guernsey and Jersey greater security and better affordability, as they will give the islands the opportunity to increase the amount of imported energy.

Long term agreements with Électricité de France (EdF) ensure the imported electricity is low carbon. Ninety percent of Guernsey’s electricity is imported from the grid.

Co-operating through the CIEG means the islands can work together towards improving the reliability of the grid system.

== Cable connections ==
Name	Type	Operational period	Route	Distance	Capacity	Status	Notes
Normandie 2	Submarine	2000–present	Saint-Rémy-des-Landes, France to Archirondel, Jersey	17 kilometres (11 mi)	90 MW	Operational	Cable contains fibre optic cables
GJ1	Submarine	2000–2018 2019-present	Queen's Road, Jersey to Barkers Quarry, Guernsey	37.4 kilometres (23.2 mi)	60 MW	Operational	Cable contains 3 fibre optic cables of 24 fibres each, ceased working in 2018 after 2 faults. Replaced in 2019 at a cost of £30m.
Normandie 3	Submarine	2014–present	Armanville (Pirou), France to Grouville Bay Jersey then to South Hill sub-station	32 kilometres (20 mi) (+ 17 km overland in France and 7 km overland in Jersey)	100 MW	Operational	
Normandie 1	Submarine	2017–present	Surville to Archirondel, Jersey	27 kilometres (17 mi) (+ 2 km overland in France)	100 MW	Operational	Work started in 2016. Follows same route as EDF1 at a cost of £40m it became operational in February 2017.
GJ2	Submarine		Jersey to Petit Bot, Guernsey	38 kilometres (24 mi)	100 MW	pending	
GF1	Submarine		Vale, Guernsey to La Manche, France	54 kilometres (34 mi)		pending	
FAB Link	Submarine		France to Alderney to Britain (FAB Link)	220 kilometres (140 mi)	1,400 MW	suspended	
EDF1	Submarine	1984 - 2012	Surville, France to Archirondel,Jersey	27 kilometres (17 mi)	50 MW	Removed	Faulty cable lifted in 2016 for recycling
	Underground		Archirondel substation to South Hill substation via Rue des Pres substation, Jersey			Operational	
	Underground		Archirondel substation to Queen's Road substation, Jersey			Operational	
	Underground		South Hill s/s to Queen's Road s/s via St. Helier West s/s, Jersey			Operational	
	Underground		South Hill s/s to Western Primary s/s, Jersey			Operational	
	Underground		Western Primary s/s to Queen's Road s/s, Jersey			Operational	
	Underground		Queen's Road to Greve de Lecq, Jersey (GJ1)			Operational	
	Underground		Barkers Quarry to Bellegreve, Guernsey			Operational	

== Future ==
- Possible - France to Guernsey
- Unlikely - Guernsey to Sark

== See also ==
- Jersey Electricity Company
- Guernsey Electricity
- List of power stations in the British Crown Dependencies
