= Commission for Regulation of Utilities =

Republic of Ireland's energy and water economic utility regulator

- An Coimisiúin um Rialáil Fóntais

State agency overview
- Formed: 14 July 1999
- Preceding agencies: Commission for Electricity Regulation; Commission for Energy Regulation
- Type: Statutory independent energy and water regulator
- Jurisdiction: Ireland
- Headquarters: The Grain House, The Exchange, Belgard Square North, Tallaght, Dublin 24, D24 PXW0; 53.289538°N 6.374483°W
- Employees: 196
- Annual budget: €29.4 million
- Minister responsible: Darragh O'Brien, Minister for Climate, Energy and the Environment
- State agency executives: Jim Gannon, Chairperson; Fergal Mulligan, Commissioner; Tanya Harrington, Commissioner
- Parent department: Department of Climate, Energy and the Environment
- Key documents: Electricity Regulation Act, 1999; Gas (Interim Regulation) Act, 2002; Water Services Act 2013
- Website: www.cru.ie

The Commission for Regulation of Utilities (CRU, Irish: An Coimisiúin um Rialáil Fóntais), formerly known as the Commission for Energy Regulation (CER, Irish: An Coimisiún um Rialáil Fuinnimh), is Ireland's energy and water economic utility regulator.

== Electricity regulation ==
The CRU licenses and monitors electricity generators.

On the transmission network, generally, the high voltage lines deliver electricity from Ireland's generation sources to the transformer stations, where the electricity voltage is reduced and taken onwards through the distribution system to individual customers' premises. There are also about 18 very large commercial customers directly connected to the transmission system.

EirGrid is the independent state-owned body licensed by the CRU to act as transmission system operator (TSO) and is responsible for the operation, development, and maintenance. The TSO also offers terms and levies charged to market participants to connect to and use the transmission system regulated by the CRU. ESB Networks is licensed by the CRU as the owner of the transmission system and is responsible for carrying out the maintenance and construction of the system.

The CRU sets the allowed revenue/tariffs for the transmission business and approves the connection policy for generators and suppliers connecting to and/or using the network.

The Distribution Network is the medium and low voltage electricity network used to deliver electricity to connection points such as houses, offices, shops, and street lights. The Distribution Network includes all overhead electricity lines, poles, and underground cables used to bring power to Ireland's customers.

ESB Networks (a ring-fenced subsidiary within the ESB Group) is the Distribution System Operator licensed by the CRU, responsible for building, maintaining, and operating the distribution network infrastructure. The Distribution Network is owned by ESB, the licensed Distribution Asset Owner.

The CER sets the allowed revenue/tariffs for the distribution business and approves the connection policy for generators and suppliers connecting to and/or using the network.

=== Supply ===
The CRU licenses and monitors electricity suppliers. The CRU has overseen the gradual liberalization of the electricity supply market, culminating in a full market opening in February 2005. The regulatory framework created the right environment for competition to develop, and since then, competition has increased in the business and domestic markets. As a result, in 2010, the CRU published its Roadmap to Deregulation, which set out the end price regulation milestones. All business markets were deregulated from 1 October 2010. Since April 2011, the domestic market has been deregulated so that all electricity suppliers may set their tariffs without price regulation from the CRU.

=== Single Electricity Market ===
Since 1 November 2007, the Commission for Regulation of Utilities, (known then as the Commission for Energy Regulation (CER)) and Utility Regulator, together referred to as the Regulatory Authorities or RAs, have jointly regulated the all-Island wholesale electricity market known as the Single Electricity Market (SEM). The SEM covers both Northern Ireland and the Republic of Ireland.

The decision-making body that governs the market is the SEM Committee, consisting of the CRU, the Utility Regulator, as well as an independent member (who also has a deputy), with each entity having one vote.

The detailed rules of the SEM are set out in the Trading and Settlement Code, which is overseen by the SEM Committee.

At a high level, the SEM includes a centralized gross pool (or spot) market, which, given its mandatory nature for key generators and suppliers, is fully liquid. In this pool, electricity is bought and sold through a market-clearing mechanism. Generators bid in the Short Run Marginal Cost (SRMC) and receive the System Marginal Price (SMP) for each trading period their scheduled market quantities. Generators also receive separate payments for the provision of available generation capacity through a capacity payment mechanism and constraint payments for differences between the market schedule and the system dispatch. Suppliers purchasing energy from the pool pay the SMP for each trading period along with capacity costs and system charges.

== Natural gas ==
There are two types of gas pipelines operating around the country. The larger pipes that transport gas long distances are known as transmission pipes, and the smaller pipes which bring gas from the transmission pipes to individual premises are known as distribution pipes. Ervia, formerly Bord Gáis Éireann (BGE), owns the transmission and distribution systems in the Republic of Ireland. Bord Gáis Networks (BGN) is the designated subsidiary within Ervia which constructs and extends the natural gas network in Ireland to the required safety standards. Gaslink is currently the TSO and DSO for gas.

The CRU sets the allowed revenue/tariffs and connection policy for the gas transmission and distribution network (similar to electricity). It licenses and monitors gas suppliers. Since 1 July 2007, Ireland's retail gas market has been open to competition, and all gas customers are eligible to switch their gas suppliers. This represents over half a million domestic customers. It continues to regulate the revenue earned and tariffs charged by Bord Gáis Energy Supply to domestic customers and works to resolve complaints that customers have with energy companies.

== Water regulation ==
The CRU is the independent economic regulator for public water and wastewater services in Ireland. In the consultation process leading up to the introduction of water charges in Ireland, the CRU has proposed that Irish Water provide two products and one service, with each household receiving a maximum of one product (either "Water" or "Not for Human Consumption Water") at a time. It is proposed that the wastewater service be charged per unit product consumed.

== See also ==
- Energy law
- World Forum on Energy Regulation
