= Ervia =

Former Irish utility company

- Type: Statutory corporation
- Industry: Public Utility
- Founded: 1976; 50 years ago in Cork, Ireland
- Defunct: 1 June 2024
- Successor: Gas Networks Ireland
- Headquarters: Cork, Ireland
- Key people: Cathal Marley (Group CEO); Tony Keohane (Chairman)
- Products: Natural gas and renewable natural gas distribution; Dark fibre
- Revenue: €506m (2014)
- Number of employees: 1,300 (2015)
- Subsidiaries: Gas Networks Ireland; Aurora Telecom
- Website: www.ervia.ie

Ervia, previously known as Bord Gáis or Bord Gáis Éireann (Irish pronunciation: [ˈbˠoːɾˠd̪ˠ ˌɡaːʃ ˈeːɾʲən̪ˠ]; meaning "Gas Board of Ireland"), is a multi-utility company distributing pipeline natural gas and dark fibre services in Ireland. The state-owned company has built an extensive network across Ireland.

In 2014 the Bord Gáis Energy division was sold to a consortium led by Centrica, and the Bord Gáis name was transferred as part of the sale. Bord Gáis Éireann was therefore renamed Ervia in June 2014 and as a result no longer sold gas directly to customers. Ervia was the ultimate parent company of dark fibre operator Aurora Telecom. In June 2024, all functions, assets and liabilities of Ervia were transferred to Gas Networks Ireland and Ervia was dissolved.

== History ==
Bord Gáis Éireann was established as a semi-state company by the Irish government in 1975 to replace a series of private-sector small city-based gas companies, some of whom had got into financial trouble. The company was originally established as a private limited company by shares, Bord Gáis Éireann Teoranta, before being converted to a statutory corporation under the Gas Act 1976, the primary legislation under which BGE operates.

Alliance and Dublin Consumers Gas Act 1847
- Act of Parliament
- Parliament of the United Kingdom
- Long title: An Act for rendering more efficient the Dublin Consumers Gas Company.
- Citation: 10 & 11 Vict. c. xlii

Dates
- Royal assent: 21 June 1847
Other legislation
Repealed by	Alliance and Dublin Gas Act 1866

Status: Repealed

Text of statute as originally enacted

Alliance and Dublin Gas Act 1866
- Act of Parliament
- Parliament of the United Kingdom
- Long title: An Act for incorporating "The Alliance and Dublin Consumers Gas Company," formed by the Amalgamation of "The Alliance and Dublin Consumers Gas Company" and "The Commercial Gas Company of Ireland, Limited;" and for authorizing the Acquisition by the Company of Gasworks and Property of "The United General Gas Company;" and for defining the Limits within which the Company may supply Gas; and for other Purposes.
- Citation: 29 & 30 Vict. c. ccv

Dates
- Royal assent: 16 July 1866

Text of statute as originally enacted

The oldest of the small private companies was the Dublin Gas Company, formally known as the Alliance and Dublin Consumers' Gas Company. The Alliance and Dublin Consumers Gas Act 1847 (10 & 11 Vict. c. xlii) had created the company by merging the Alliance Gas Company, and the Dublin Consumers Gas Company, which had been formed in 1844 by a group of prominent citizens chaired by Daniel O'Connell, a prominent Irish politician and Lord Mayor of Dublin. The Alliance and Dublin Gas Act 1866 (29 & 30 Vict. c. ccv) merged the Commercial Gas Company of Ireland into the Alliance and Dublin Consumer's Gas Company. After initially supplying the company (known simply as Dublin Gas by the 1980s) with wholesale natural gas, Bord Gáis acquired the assets of the company when it went into receivership in 1987, including its landmark art deco head office, Dublin Gas Company Building in D'Olier Street. Other town gas companies were acquired by Bord Gáis in Cork, Limerick, Clonmel, and Kilkenny.

Existing gas suppliers acquired included the Cork Gas Company (in 1985) and the Kilkenny Gas Company, Clonmel Corporation Gasworks and Limerick Corporation Gasworks (all in 1986). The Dublin Gas Company was acquired in 1987.

In 2002, Bord Gáis Éireann sold the Dublin Gas Company Building to Trinity College Dublin and moved to purpose-built premises in Foley Street, Dublin, which is now the main offices of Bord Gáis Energy. Bord Gáis now have offices at Lower Mount Street, Dublin.

For nearly two decades the main supply of gas available for Bord Gáis came from the Kinsale Head gas field, an offshore field discovered in 1971. Owned by Marathon Petroleum, it was worked from 1978 to 2020, the gas coming ashore at Inch, County Cork.

=== Deregulation of the Irish gas market ===
Beginning in the early 2000s Ireland's state owned public utilities underwent major reform thanks to the adoption by EU members of the European Union's Third Energy Package. This required vertically integrated utilities such as Bord Gáis Éireann to legally demarcate and split into two roles: the Transmission System Operator (TSO) and the Distribution System Operator (DSO) although a combined DSO/TSO was permissible as long as the two were ring-fenced from one another This resulted in two new "arms length" entities being created inside the Bord Gáis group; Bord Gáis Networks and Bord Gáis Energy Supply. A similar situation took place with the Electricity Supply Board with it being split into two main units, legally distinct and separate; ESB Networks and ESB Customer Supply, now called Electric Ireland, although both being owned by the ESB Group.

On 18 February 2009 Bord Gáis Energy Supply rebranded as Bord Gáis Energy and competed in a new, fully deregulated gas market, legally separate and distinct from the rest of Bord Gáis Éireann. As part of the overall opening up of the energy market in Ireland as a whole Bord Gáis Energy entered the deregulated electricity market offering dual fuel bundles to consumers. Other companies including Airtricity and Electric Ireland also began competing with Bord Gáis Energy in the gas sector, with Bord Gáis Networks being impartial towards all companies who wished to utilise the gas network. It was expected BGE would be no different than any other gas provider.

=== Sale of Bord Gáis Energy ===
A condition of the EU/IMF bailout programme for Ireland required the Irish government to sell off some state owned assets to help pay down loans and reduce Ireland's debt burden. In February 2012 the Irish government announced it would sell Bord Gáis Energy as required under the bailout terms.

In March 2014 Bord Gáis Éireann confirmed it would sell its customer supply arm Bord Gáis Energy to a consortium made up of Centrica, Brookfield Renewable Energy and iCON Infrastructure to the value of €1.1 billion. The sale involved the splitting of the group's retail unit among the three buyers. The main retail division would be bought by Centrica, while its wind assets under SWS would be acquired by Brookfield Renewable Energy Partners and iCON infrastructure acquiring Northern Ireland based Firmus Energy. As part of the deal the Bord Gáis name would go to Centrica requiring the rump entity to be renamed.

In June 2014 Bord Gáis Éireann was renamed Ervia becoming a holding company of three distinct utility firms: Gas Networks Ireland (formerly Bord Gáis Networks), Irish Water and Aurora Telecom.

=== Dissolution ===
In October 2020, the government of Ireland decided that Ervia would be dissolved and its functions integrated into Gas Networks Ireland.

The Gas (Amendment) and Miscellaneous Provisions Act 2024, an act of the Oireachtas, provided for the dissolution of Ervia. This took effect on 1 June 2024. This left Gas Networks Ireland as a standalone entity owned by the State.

== Subsidiaries ==
=== Gas Networks Ireland ===
Bord Gáis Networks Logo

Gas Networks Ireland (Irish: Líonraí Gáis Éireann) owns, and is responsible for the operation, maintenance and development of Ireland's natural gas transmission and distribution networks, consisting of over 14,600 km of pipeline. The network provides gas to customers in all major Irish cities, along with several towns across the country. Numerous suppliers provide gas services to customers and businesses via this network of pipelines.

Two interconnectors link the pipeline network to Scotland (with a spur from one of the interconnectors linking to the Isle of Man supplying the Manx Utilities Authority).

Most of its modern gas supply is imported, though a new gas field known as the Corrib field off the County Mayo coast came on stream in 2015. However, Ervia only purchases a small amount of the offtake; the majority is traded on the Intercontinental Exchange.

=== Aurora Telecom ===
Aurora Telecom specialises in providing dark fibre services to the private sector. Due to being a subsidiary company of Gas Networks Ireland, Aurora Telecom is able to utilise the former's extensive gas pipeline network to lay fibre optic lines, principally in Dublin, though with an owned and operated network now stretching from the capital to Cork, Limerick and Galway via several towns including Athlone, Mullingar and Ennis.

== Former operations ==
=== Bord Gáis Energy ===
Bord Gáis Energy was previously the retail (industrial, commercial and residential) division of Bord Gáis Éireann. In February 2012 the Irish government announced its intention to sell Bord Gáis Energy as part of the reforms required following the banking crisis bailout and finalised the deal in June 2014. Today Bord Gáis Energy is a completely independent entity from Ervia.

=== Bord Gáis retail network ===
Bord Gáis Éireann maintained twelve stores (branded Energy Supply Stores) around the country, however they are run on a franchise basis and not by Bord Gáis itself. In 2002 Bord Gáis Natural Gas Showroom in D'Olier Street, operated by the company itself, was closed, in 2006 its Cork company-owned showroom was also closed.

=== Irish Water ===
The Water Services Act 2013 created Irish Water as a subsidiary of Bord Gáis Éireann, to provide "safe, clean and affordable water and waste water services" to water users in Ireland. Public concerns on operational, documentation, and financial issues were highlighted throughout the initial months of the subsidiary's operations.

Irish Water is accountable to two regulatory bodies: the Commission for Regulation of Utilities (CRU), the economic regulator for the water industry; and the Environmental Protection Agency (EPA), the environmental regulator.

On 31 December 2022, Irish Water was renamed Uisce Éireann. On 1 January 2023, Uisce Éireann was separated from Ervia and established as a standalone national water authority.

=== SWS ===
In late 2009 Bord Gáis Éireann bought the wind energy company SWS.

However, as part of the large scale EU/IMF mandated divestiture of many state assets mid 2014 the company was sold to Canadian energy firm Brookfield Renewable Energy Partners for US$680 million as part of the sale of Bord Gáis Energy to British energy giant Centrica.

=== Firmus Energy ===
Bord Gáis had a plan to develop the gas market in Northern Ireland. A pipeline from Carrickfergus to Derry was completed in October 2004 and now serves Coolkeeragh Power Station. A second pipeline, known as the south–north pipeline, was commissioned in October 2006. It runs from Gormanston in the Republic of Ireland to join the Carrick/Derry pipeline near Antrim creating an all-Ireland network and providing redundancy in case of problems with either Scotland - Northern Ireland pipeline or the Scotland - Ireland interconnectors.

The Utility Regulator for Northern Ireland awarded Bord Gáis a licence to supply homes and businesses in the towns and cities near the two pipelines - Antrim, Armagh, Ballymena, Ballymoney, Banbridge, Craigavon, Derry, Limavady and Newry - where the local subsidiaries of BG used the trading name of Firmus Energy. On 1 December 2005, Firmus launched their first supply in Northern Ireland, to the large Michelin tyre factory in Ballymena. On 25 April 2006 Firmus connected its first residential customers in Derry.

As part of the Irish government's disposal of state owned assets Firmus Energy was sold in March 2014 to iCON Infrastructure.

=== Gaslink ===
On 4 July 2008, an "arms-length" subsidiary of Bord Gáis, Gaslink was established to perform the role of transmission and distribution system operator. However, as part of cost-cutting measures on 1 August 2015 Gaslink was abolished and its responsibilities rolled back into Gas Networks Ireland.

== Main offices ==
- Ervia HQ - Webworks, Eglinton Street, Cork 51.8972°N 8.4644°W
- Gas Networks Ireland - Gasworks Road, Cork 51.8950°N 8.4606°W
- Aurora Telecom - Donmoy House, St Margaret's Road, Finglas, Dublin 11 53.4054°N 6.3026°W
