= Water supply and sanitation in Denmark =

Data
- Water coverage (broad definition): 100%
- Sanitation coverage (broad definition): 100%
- Share of collected wastewater treated: 100%
- Continuity of supply: 100%
- Average urban water use (L/person/day): 114 (2009)
- Average urban water and sanitation tariff (US$/m^{3}): DKK 398 or US$83/month (2006) for 10m3/month
- Share of household metering: High
- Non-revenue water: 7%

Institutions
- Decentralization to municipalities: Yes
- National water and sanitation company: None
- Water and sanitation regulator: None
- Sector law: Water Supply Act of 1978 and subsequent amendments
- Service providers: 2740 (2001)

Public water supply and sanitation in Denmark is characterized by universal access and generally good service quality. Some important features of the sector in Denmark as compared to other developed countries are:

- service provision only by public and cooperative providers
- the introduction of a voluntary benchmarking system in 1999
- substantial increases in efficiency and cost savings attributed to benchmarking.

== Access ==
		Urban (85% of the population)	Rural (15% of the population)	Total
Water	Broad definition	100%	100%	100%
	House connections	100%	100%	100%
Sanitation	Sewerage	89%	89%	89%

Source: WHO/UNICEF Joint Monitoring Program (2004)

Access to improved water supply and sanitation in Denmark is universal. It is estimated that 89% of households are connected to the sewer network and 11% are served by on-site sanitation systems such as septic tanks.

== Water use and sources ==
Total water consumption in Denmark is almost 1000 million m^{3} per year, which comes entirely from groundwater. This compares to an estimated resource of 1,800 million m^{3} groundwater per year. About one third is consumed by households, one third by agriculture and market gardens, and one third by industry and institutions. Some industries buy water from the public network, while others pump their own water.

Household water use in Denmark stood at 114 liters/capita/day in 2009. Between 1994 and 2009, household consumption has declined from 50 to 41.4 m3 per person per year. Water savings were caused by new installations (e.g. shower and toilets), water saving campaigns and a higher awareness of the environment among consumers, combined with a rise in the water price.

== Quality of service ==
The whole population has continuous access to an improved water supply and improved sanitation. A consumer survey by the utility association DANVA in 2006 showed that satisfaction with water suppliers, water quality and security of supply is very high.

According to the European Environment and Health Committee the national microbial failure rate (measured against E. coli) among large water supply systems is generally zero. Very occasionally, large water supply plants have microbiological failures during a limited period. The national chemical failure rate (measured against nitrate ion or against other ions of local importance) among large water supply systems is near zero. In some parts of the country nitrate in drinking water is elevated. About 70,000 families depend on small private water supply systems. The majority of these water supply systems face problems with either nitrate pollution due to extensive agriculture production and/or pollution with pesticides or bacterial contamination. All water supplies, including small private supplies, are under regular control by the local authorities and action is taken if the water quality is poor.

In 2009, the proportion of microbiological tests which complied with legislative requirements was more than 96%. The quality of the drinking water is checked at the waterworks, in the distribution network and at consumers' taps.

== Waste handling ==
Waste collection was 11.7 million ton from business and households in 2017. Of this, 68% was recycled, 29% was incinerated, and 3% was deposited in landfills.

== Responsibility for water supply and sanitation ==
=== Policy and regulation ===
No single Ministry in the government of Denmark is responsible for water supply and sanitation, which is considered foremost a local government responsibility. The Danish Environmental Protection Agency is responsible for environmental policy.

In addition to the central authorities, there are two main levels of authorities responsible for water and wastewater services. There are 5 regional councils and 98 local (municipal) councils in Denmark. The regional councils are responsible for the use and protection of water resources, including extraction permits for large abstractions, and for monitoring the water quality of recipient water bodies (rivers, sea etc.), including authorizations to discharge wastewater. The municipal councils are responsible for the planning, administration and supervision of all water suppliers and the water supply infrastructure. They monitor and enforce compliance with all laws and regulations with regards to water and wastewater provision. The local authorities can issue extraction permits for small abstractions and they also operate a solid system of water quality regulation.

=== Service provision ===
The Danish water supply is highly decentralized, with large and small waterworks situated all over the country. In 2001 there were 2740 "common utilities", of which municipalities owned 165 and 2575 were owned by consumers' co-operatives. Between 1980 and 2001, the number of utilities has been reduced by 29%. In spite of the high number of utilities, 60% of the drinking water is delivered by municipal utilities which account for only 6% of all utilities. In many cases, thus, municipalities both regulate certain aspects of service provision and provide those same services.

=== Associations ===
The Danish Water and Waste Water Association (DANVA) is a national association of water and waste water utilities. It is a non-profit organization funded by its members, who are utilities, municipalities, consultants, contractors and personal members. Its objective "is to look after the common interests of Danish water and sewerage suppliers in promoting a steady and high-quality water and sewerage supply on an environmentally sustainable basis." DANVA was formed in 2002 as a merger of the two associations, the Danish Water Supply Association and the Danish Wastewater Association

== Benchmarking ==
The Danish water sector has carried out voluntary benchmarking surveys since 1999 in order to help service providers to improve their efficiency. The project is more than just a comparison of key indicators (performance benchmarking). It includes also process benchmarking, the setting of service goals and the development of a default chart of accounts. The project is financially independent through the payment of fees by participating utilities. It is estimated that around DK 15 million (US$3.15m) will have been spent on benchmarking by 2009. The Danish benchmarking project is part of a North European benchmarking cooperation (NEBC) initiated in 2004 by the national water associations and several water utilities of Denmark, Finland, the Netherlands, Norway and Sweden with the support of the International Water Association. It builds on the pioneering efforts of the Netherlands in this field.

In 2003 the Danish government undertook a "service check" which estimated a potential for efficiency improvements worth DK 1.3 billion (US$ 273m) annually. Indeed, between 2002 and 2006 utilities participating in the benchmarking project were able to achieve annual savings of DK 450 million (US$94.5m) in operations and maintenance without any reduction of service quality or harm to the environment. The utility association DANVA attributes these savings to lessons that utilities drew from its benchmarking system. The exact source of the savings remains a bit unclear. The savings were not achieved in energy efficiency, since the specific energy consumption actually increased from 2 kWh/m3 in 2002 to 2.3 kWh/m3 in 2006; around 2% of national energy usage. Neither were they achieved in reducing water losses, which hovered around the very low level of 6% during this period.

=== Efficiency ===
There is a huge span between the lowest and the highest operating and maintenance costs for water supply in Denmark, varying from DKK 2 to DKK 13 per cubic meter (without wastewater and taxes). This suggests that there is still scope for realizing savings. These differences are determined by structural differences (such as depth of groundwater table and location of wells from consumption centers) and politically determined differences (such as pipe replacement policies and the extent of efforts going into groundwater protection).

Water losses accounted for 7% of production in 2009, or 1.6 m3 per km of pipe and day. This is about the same level as in the Netherlands, but much higher than in Scotland, England and Wales or Australia, according to figures by the British water regulator OFWAT quoted by DANVA. Water losses have declined from 3.4 m^{3}/km/day in 1992. Suppliers must pay a tax in the event of water losses in excess of 10% as an incentive to reduce water loss.

== Financial aspects ==
=== Cost recovery ===
Danish legislation requires full cost recovery for both water supply and sanitation (break-even principle).

=== Tariffs ===
In 2009, the average price for water and wastewater including taxes (VAT and green taxes) was DKK 52.30/m^{3} (US$8.36) – one of the highest tariffs in the EU. It consists of 24% for water, 48% for wastewater and 30% for taxes. The total price of water measured in fixed prices has increased by 32% between 1996 and 2006. Nevertheless, a household's average expenditures for tap water and wastewater accounted for only about 0.13% of its total income. This share has remained constant, mainly because water consumption declined while tariffs increased. Water prices vary a lot from one supplier to another depending on costs. The connection fee of a normal city one-family house was DKK 12,191 in 2001, varying from DKK 0 to 24,735.

According to a 2006 survey by NUS consulting the average water tariff (price) without sewerage for large (commercial) consumers using 10,000 cubic meters per year in Denmark was the equivalent of US$2.24 per cubic meter. This was the highest tariff among the 14 mostly OECD countries covered by the report.

=== Investment ===
Investments stood at DKK 4.03 per m3 in 2009.

== See also ==
- EU water policy
- Water Framework Directive
