= Guernsey Electricity =

Electric supply company on Guernsey Island

Guernsey Electricity Limited
- Industry: Electricity utility
- Founded: 1907
- Headquarters: Guernsey, Bailiwick of Guernsey, Channel Islands
- Key people: Alan Bates, Chief Executive
- Website: www.electricity.gg

Guernsey Electricity Limited (GE) is the sole commercial electricity supplier on the island of Guernsey. GE has been operating for over 100 years, moving from local generation of power from coal, and later oil, to investing in cables to connect into the grids in Jersey and France through the Channel Islands Electricity Grid.

== Business model ==
The cable connection to France provides most of the electric energy sold in Guernsey, but the power station still needs to maintain sufficient capacity to generate power should the cable fail. There are eight oil-fired diesel engines and three oil-fired gas turbines. These include two new diesel engines, given the names "Trudy"and "Freddy", costing £15m each, which were installed in engine room "D" in March 2017.

Environmental and cost considerations require the maximum use of the cable link, which is limited to 60MW.

- Minimum demand is around 23 MW, with peak demand in 2022 of 95 MW.
- Revenue from electricity sales in 2022 was £54.7m.
- 29,763 customers in 2022
- 340,726 MWh imported 2022
- 30,006 MWh generated in 2022
- 357,311 MWh distributed 2022
- Power outages were an average of 23 minutes in 2022
- In 2022 92% of electricity was imported using the cable link.

A retail shop is attached to the power station at North Side, Vale.

GE is governed by the Electricity (Guernsey) Law, 2001 (as amended) and is regulated by the Channel Islands Competition and Regulatory Authorities.

=== Undersea cables ===
In the mid-1970s investigations were undertaken to determine the practicality of an undersea cable. Jersey connected to France in 1984 (EDF1). No further decision was taken until 1996 when it was agreed to connect Guernsey to Jersey (GJ1) and lay a second 90 MW cable (Normandie 2) from France to Jersey, the work being completed in 2000 at a cost of £50m. The cables contain a 24 fibre optic communications cable.

A second 100 MW DC cable (GJ2) was planned to be installed, but was suspended after the existing GJ1 failed. GJ1 was replaced in 2019.

GE has invested heavily in the Channel Islands Electricity Grid, using debt to finance the investment, but losses in 2019 and 2020 as a result of the failure of the GJ1 cable requiring oil to be burnt for fuel, and the cost of the replacement GJ1, damaged finances.

The possibility of a 54 km (34 mi) direct cable to France designated GF1 was discussed in 2021.

== Future plans ==
In 2023 a plan for the next 25 years recommended:

- A new 100 MW cable (GF1) connecting Guernsey to France
- Solar panels to provide around 8-10% of Guernsey's needs
- Offshore wind farm to supply 46-55% of electricity needs

The plan received political approval in September 2023.

Estimated costs are:

- 2024-25 £63m for upgrading the thermal plant (current power station) and £10m for solar
- 2026-30 £96m for GF1 interconnector and £6m for solar
- 2031-35 £203m for offshore wind and £6m for solar
- 2036-40 £28m for hydrogen fuel cell, £63m for existing thermal plant and £6m for solar
- 2041-45 £6m for hydrogen fuel cell, £59m for existing thermal plant and £8m for solar
- 2046-50 £14m for thermal plant and £6m for solar

The price paid by consumers is expected to rise until 2030, then gradually fall.

== History ==
=== Early electricity uses in Guernsey ===
In 1887 a dynamo was used to generate electricity for street lighting in front of Randalls Brewery in the Avenue, followed in 1897 by a water-powered first domestic installation at Le Chalet, Fermain Bay.

In 1898 Edmundsons Electricity Corporation was granted the concession to build and operate an electricity supply in Guernsey. 7 kilometres (4.3 mi) of cables would have to be installed below ground within two years. In February 1900 150 kW could be generated from the power station at Les Amballes, St Peter Port.

Prepayment meters had to be provided that would take English or French coins. Three currencies were in circulation in Guernsey at that time. £1 Guernsey was equivalent to 19s British, and 10d Guernsey was worth 1 French franc. Units being sold at 7d for the first unit per day and 4d thereafter.

The quarry industry needed electricity for cranes, and in 1902 it was decided to build a second power station at St Sampson's; this took the generating capacity to 870 kW, with units supplied rising from 65,000 to 1.75m a year in 1910. A 2,500 volt DC cable connected the two generating centres. A battery storage system was used to provide a 24-hour service. This meant the generators only needed to operate four days a week. With 1,000 consumers by 1910, the price per unit fell to an average of 2 1/2d.

=== Guernsey Electric Light and Power Company Limited ===
In 1907 a company was formed, Guernsey Electric Light and Power Company Limited to run the Edmunsons business in Guernsey. Between 1908 and 1911 diesel generators were installed at both power stations, increasing capacity to 1,340 kW. An explosion in November 1918 at the Vale power station left the road covered in debris. The increased price of coal and oil during World War I and the requirement to expand the network resulted in a new law which increased tariffs and allowed overhead lines to be installed in country areas.

- Connections created to charge electric vehicles – 1914
- Wind turbine built – 1925

In 1933 the States of Guernsey cancelled the concession and acquired the business at a cost of £285,500 at which time the capacity was 3.73 MW with 2,928 consumers on 165 kilometres (103 mi) of cables with eight substations. It would be supervised by the States Electricity Board.

1934 saw the start of a 50 Hz 230 V AC supply, however some existing consumers took decades to change from DC. In 1938 the last coal-fired generator was retired as new fuel tanks were built to store oil. By 1939 an additional 110 km of mains cables were installed with 17 additional substations built and 6.9m units were sold a year to 5,774 consumers.

=== Occupation ===
In June 1940 two thirds of the employees were evacuated to England, leaving 36 volunteer employees to suffer the German occupation. Restrictions were placed on electricity usage, sufficient oil was available to provide reduced power until May 1941. The generation of power from burning waste was tested, with coal burning as a backup system, it helped meet the minimum essential load requirement of 145 kW. Supply fell to 3.4m kW, the main user of power was the German occupiers with most of their power being paid for by the States of Guernsey. Limited supplies of oil arrived on the island and generators were changed to run off town gas. The Organisation Todt (OT) who were constructing defences in the island were required to arrange for the delivery of oil to generate the electricity they needed.

The winter of 1942-3 showed excessive unit usage, which could be demonstrated that 75% of usage was to German-occupied premises with a number of illegal connections. Further restrictions were imposed in October 1943 allowing four units of power per week per house. The OT built a power station to run off anthracite and coal in the Petit Bouet with a 720 kW capacity and using sea water for cooling.

By January 1945 electric power was barely available to process milk or purify and pump water. Coal brought in by the Red Cross of the SS Vega in April allowed coke to be produced from which electricity could be generated for civilian use. Guernsey was liberated on 9 May 1945.

=== Post War ===
The immediate aftermath of the war saw repairs necessary in many areas however replacement machinery was hard to obtain.

During the 1950s demand increased rapidly with sales reaching 32.5m units and consumers rising to 14,805. An AC ring main was constructed around the island. Eight new generators were acquired giving a capacity of 12.5MW. DC was replaced with AC when opportunities arose however there were still over 600 DC customers in 1966.

A new generating hall ‘B’ was built. as demand continued to rise and more generators were acquired, including a Stal Laval GT35 gas turbine, taking the total to 24, including 12 Mirrlees KVSS12 and 6 Mirrlees Major's, providing 54.6MW. By 1970 consumers reached 21,507 with 130.7m units sold. ‘C’ engine hall was constructed in 1979 to house new Sulzer 9RNF68 generators and ‘A’ hall decommissioned.

The 1980s saw capacity increase to 72MW in 1984 which was adequate for the maximum demand of 43MW, however demand was still increasing reaching 64.5MW on 8 January 1997, a new Sulzer 9RTA58 generator was housed in the new ‘D’ generating hall and two new Thomassen gas turbines were acquired. The last DC customer was Randalls Brewery which converted their bottling plant to AC in 1987.

In 1998 GE was commercialised as a trading company with assets of £91.5m. Thermal efficiency of generating plant had risen to 43%, system load factor had reached 58% and distribution system losses reduced to 9.5%.
