= Jersey Electricity =

Provider for electricity in Jersey

Jersey Electricity plc
- Company type: Public limited company
- Industry: Energy
- Founded: April 1924
- Headquarters: Jersey
- Key people: Phil Austin, Chairman, Chris Ambler, CEO
- Website: Official website

Jersey Electricity plc or Jersey Electricity (informally JE) is a public limited company, and the sole provider for electricity in Jersey. JE has two sites around the Island: Queens Road, St Helier, the site of two Rolls-Royce Olympus gas turbines and La Collette Power Station where there are five Sulzer Diesel turbines, one Rolls-Royce Olympus turbine, and three Parsons steam turbines.

== History ==
Jersey Electricity was founded in April 1924, with a small generating station at the end of Albert Pier. Within a decade it had moved to a new, bigger power station at Queens Road, the site of today's Powerhouse retail park and administration offices.

By the 1960s, increased demand for electricity meant a move to an even bigger station. The company was listed on the London Stock Exchange to raise capital for the building of La Collette Power Station that served the Island for over 50 years. Today, La Collette is the controlling hub of a transmission network that includes three multi-million-pound undersea supply cables that import 95% as low-carbon power from France. Its generating plant is maintained for emergency back-up only as Jersey now benefits from a decarbonised electricity supply. The security of this supply has been called into question, however, after recent threats by the French government relating to retaliation over fishing rights.

In 2022, Jersey Electricity announced intended partnerships with local landowners to install several strategically placed ground-mounted solar arrays to further diversify supplies and increase energy sovereignty. The first array in Rue du Moulin à Vent, St. Clement, will generate enough power for nearly 650 fully electric homes when complete.

== Group ==
The JE group includes many varied businesses including JE Building Services (JEBS), Jendev, Channel Islands Electricity Grid a joint-venture, Jersey Energy, Foreshore, Jersey Deep Freeze Ltd, Jersey Electricity Retail.

== Retail ==
The group also own a retail store, called The Powerhouse. The store sells home appliances and technology products.

In 2014, a portion of the store was let to Sports Direct and then to Majestic Wine in 2024.

== See also ==
- La Collette Power Station
- Guernsey Electricity
