= Isle of Man to England Interconnector =

Subsea electricity cable between British mainland and Isle of Man

- Map of Isle of Man to England Interconnector

Location
- Country: United Kingdom & Isle of Man
- Coordinates: 53°50′57″N 03°01′46″W; 54°08′52″N 4°28′51″W
- From: Bispham, Blackpool, England
- Passes through: Irish Sea
- To: Douglas Head, Isle of Man

Ownership information
- Partners: National Grid plc

Construction information
- Cable manufacturer: BICC, Erith; Pirelli Cables, Southampton
- Construction started: 1999
- Commissioned: 2000

Technical information
- Type: submarine cable
- Current type: AC
- Total length: 104 km (65 mi)
- Capacity: 40 MW
- AC voltage: 90 kV

The Isle of Man to England Interconnector is a submarine power cable connecting the transmission system of the Manx Utilities Authority to that of Great Britain. With an undersea section of approximately 104 km (65 miles), it is the second-longest AC undersea cable in the world. (Note: Longer undersea cables exist, but all operate on direct current.)

== Route ==
It was laid in 1999 between Bispham, Blackpool, England, and Douglas Head on the Isle of Man, commencing commercial operations in November 2000. It is capable of continuous operation of 40 MW at 90 kV (although other sources say 65 MW at 132 kV AC)

== Structure ==
The cable was manufactured in two parts: one section at the former BICC works in Erith and the other at Pirelli Cables in Southampton. It ended the Isle of Man's dependence on local diesel-powered generation. Power supplies to the island were increased in 2003 by an 85 MW combined cycle gas turbine power station at Pulrose, in the capital, Douglas.

The electricity cable is bundled with a fibre-optic cable which is used for telecommunications. The cable is owned by e-llan Communications, which is part of Manx Utilities. The electricity cable is used for importing and exporting electricity between the Isle of Man and the GB National Grid.

The cable is mostly buried at around 2 m (7 ft) depth but is on the seabed surface at six locations with protective cable mattresses.

== Capacity ==
On the 20th anniversary in 2020 of its commissioning a total of 1.5 TWh of power has been exported to the UK grid which contributed £47 million to the revenue of the Isle of Man.

The amount of electricity sold to the UK since 2014–15 and the revenue gained each year was as follows:

Year	2014–15	2015–16	2016–17	2017–18	2018–19	2019–20	2020–21
Electricity to the UK, GWh	93	87	105	95	131	192	168
Revenue from sales to UK	£1.8M	£3.2M	£4.6M	£3.2M	£3.4M	£4.3M	£3.8M

== See also ==
- Western HVDC Link between Scotland and Wales
- HVDC Moyle between Scotland and Northern Ireland
- East–West Interconnector between Wales and the Republic of Ireland
- Manx Utilities Authority
