= Cyclone Niklas =

2015 European windstorm

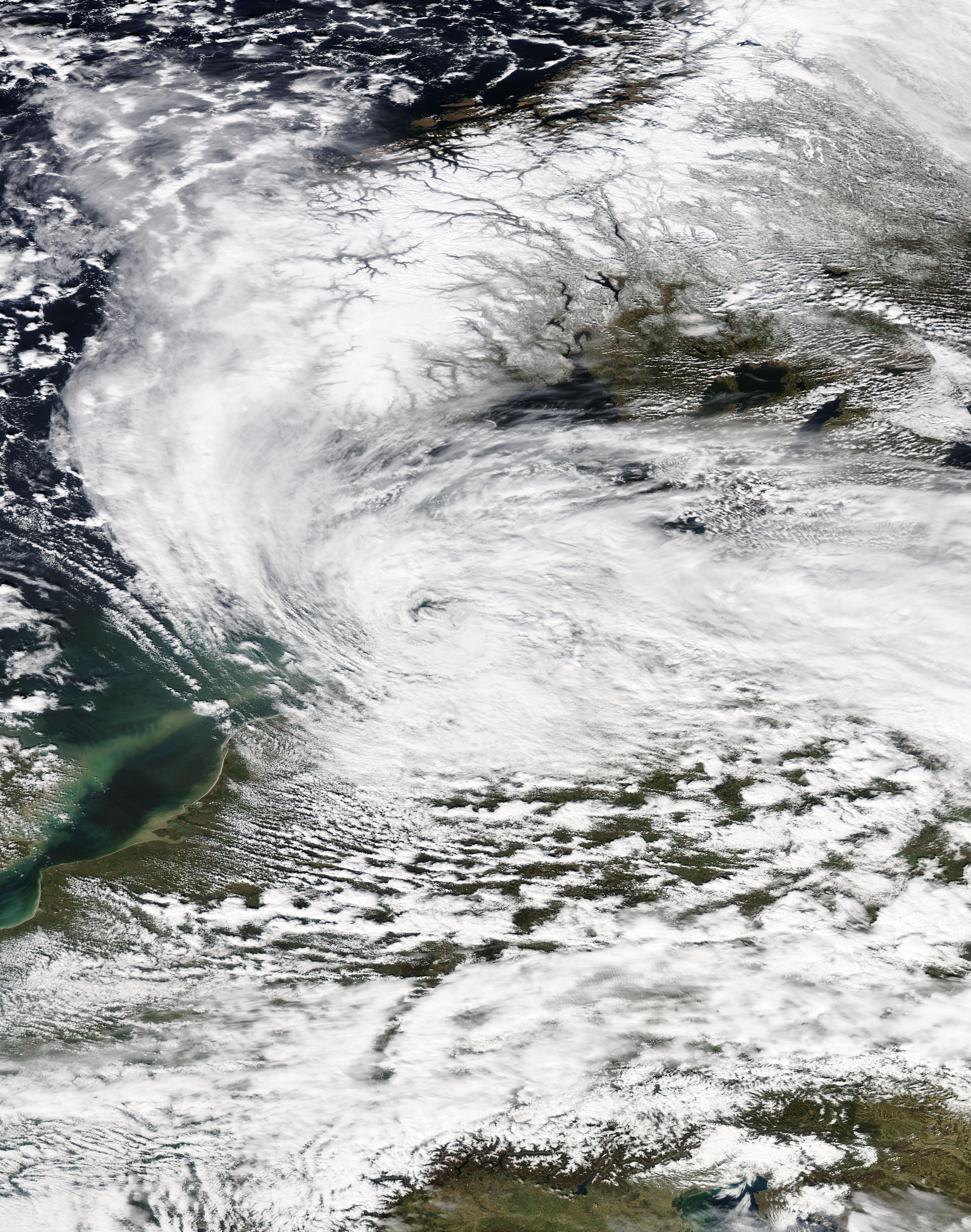
- Satellite image of Niklas 31 March 2015 10.30 UTC

Meteorological history
- Formed: 29 March 2015
- Dissipated: 6 April 2015

European windstorm, Extratropical cyclone, Winter storm
- Highest gusts: 192 km/h (119 mph)
- Lowest pressure: 971.4 mb (28.69 inHg)

Overall effects
- Casualties: at least 11 (1? UK, 1 Switzerland, 1 Netherlands, 9 Germany, 1 Austria)
- Areas affected: United Kingdom, Netherlands, Belgium, Germany, Switzerland, Austria, Poland, Czech Republic, Slovakia.

Cyclone Niklas, also known as the Lentestorm (spring storm) in the Netherlands, was a European windstorm that affected areas of western and central Europe with widespread disruption to air, shipping and road transport at the end of March 2015.

The storm also caused forestry and property damage, power outages and led to the loss of several lives.

The storm was classified as one of the top 30 most destructive storms to strike Holland since 1971.

Wind speeds of more than 200 km/h were recorded in some places during the storm.

== Meteorological history ==
Air pressure development of Mike and Niklas storms

Preceding the development of the Niklas storm on 28–29 March strong rainfall was reported in the southern Germany. The 24-hour rainfall of 29–30 March in the Black Forest saw more than 60 litres per square metre (1.2 imp gal/sq ft) fall. The Niklas storm was preceded by the low pressure named Mike by the Free University of Berlin, which brought hurricane strength winds to Germany on 30 March. Gust reports from this low pressure at the high-altitude stations of Brocken were of 152 km/h (94 mph) (force 12) and Zugspitze 137 km/h (85 mph).

The Niklas storm began to develop on 29 March off the Newfoundland coast. Powerful air temperature differences across Europe led to a strong upper air flow at 2.5 km altitude. Embedded in this was a shortwave trough, which promoted the intensification of the surface low Niklas as it came across Scotland. A plume of colder air from area of Iceland and Greenland also formed a strong temperature gradient with warmer air masses from the Atlantic circulating around high pressure centred to the west of Iberia which helped intensify the storm. Together with an area of low pressure over Scandinavia, which formed a strong air pressure gradient across north-west Europe, The approach of the low pressure saw a tightening of the air pressure gradient especially in the German Bight and north west Germany. The pressure difference being between 1,035 hPa (30.6 inHg) in the high pressure situated to the west of Iberia, to a low of 971.4 hPa (28.69 inHg) recorded at the Ekofisk platform in the North Sea. This situation was coupled with a powerful jet stream above the developing storm.

Niklas developed as it crossed the UK reaching a low pressure 971.4 hPa (28.69 inHg) as it crossed the North Sea, and in the course of a day moved to southern Denmark before continuing to the southern Baltic Sea and on towards the Baltic States.

The storm field drew across Western Europe on 30 and 31 March 2015, reaching the Netherlands and large areas of Germany on 31 March 2015. Hurricane-force winds were reported in Germany, according to the German Weather service (DWD) with a peak gust at altitude on the mountains of Zugspitze (192 km/h [119 mph]), the Brocken (162 km/h [101 mph]), Feldberg in the Black Forest (151 km/h [94 mph]) and on Weinbiet in Neustadt (148 km/h [92 mph]). At lower elevations on the North Sea coast peak gusts of 140 km/h (87 mph) were reported. The storm was absorbed by windstorm Oskar on 6 April.

== Storm context ==
The Royal Dutch Meteorological Institute, KNMI ranked the storm at 27th place in the Netherlands since 1971, displacing Cyclone Xaver to 28th place which was of comparable strength in the country.

The wind speeds encountered in Germany from the Niklas storm were comparable to the strongest wind speeds (in both the peak gusts and in the highest 10-minute average wind speeds) recorded during March over the 1981-2010 reference period. The Niklas storm is thus one of the most violent storms encountered in Germany during March. which is particularly noteworthy as the storm occurred so late in March and after the beginning of meteorological spring.

According to the German Weather Service, DWD the Niklas storm is akin to Cyclone Emma (1 March 2008), which was one of the strongest storms witnessed in Germany during March, and was especially damaging in Bavaria, which reported winds up to 220 km/h (140 mph) on the Wendelstein Mountain and rainfall totals up to 60 mm (2.4 in).

In comparison with other recent storms in Germany, the St. Jude storm of October 2013 and the Kyrill storm of January 2007 affected the northern half of Germany, with the St. Jude storm particularly affecting the far north of Germany, where it was stronger than Niklas. In the southern half of Germany the Niklas storm was stronger than either of these two winter storms. Cyclone Niklas is regarded as being not quite as strong in Germany as the Kyrill storm which had a slightly higher peak gust speed and longer duration.

MeteoSwiss reported that in March winds over 100 km/h (62 mph) would be expected to recur on the Swiss Plateau approximately once every four years. Between the mid-1980s and 2001 the return period for these winds was approximately one in three years, but has been less commonly observed in recent years. Considered throughout the year (not just for the month of March) the wind gusts measured on 31 March 2015 were not exceptional. In the Swiss lowlands such a wind event occurs about once in every two years, though locally, there were gusts which only occur at that location once every 5 to 6 years, for example at Affoltern, Zürich. In the Swiss mountains a gust of 160 km/h (99 mph) was measured on Säntis, which occurs approximately every 1 to 2 years, and on Mount Pilatus a gust of 150 km/h (93 mph) was recorded, which is expected about every 4 to 5 years.

Niklas was not thought to represent an insurance loss in the league of that seen following the catastrophic damages of Cyclone Lothar and Martin in France 1999, where peak gusts of over 270 km/h (170 mph) were measured.

== Impact ==
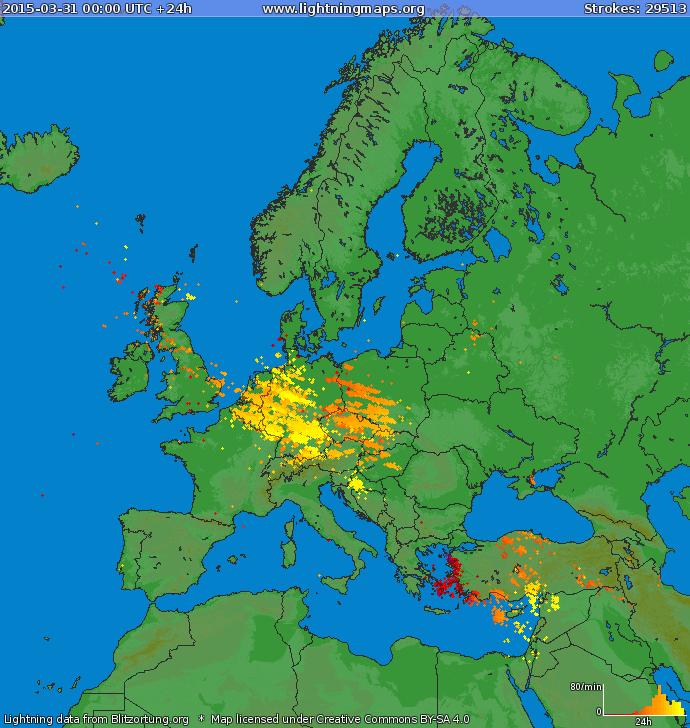
Lightning across Europe 31 March 2015

=== United Kingdom ===
In the United Kingdom the Met Office gave out a yellow "be aware" warning for wind. The hashtag #windy was trending on UK social media on the morning of 31 March.

Wales saw maximum wind gusts of 156 km/h (97 mph) at Capel Curig, Conwy. Around Wales both bridges of the Severn crossing were closed, along with temporary closures of the Cleddau Bridge in Pembrokeshire and the Britannia Bridge across the Menai Strait. Structural damage was also reported to property in the capital Cardiff and Mountain Ash, Rhondda Cynon Taf.

In the North East of England a lorry overturned in the wind on the A1(M) motorway near Sedgefield. The A66 road from Scotch Corner to Cumbria was closed to high sided vehicles in both directions for several hours, while the A19 road was brought to a standstill in Teesside after a lorry was blown over on the Leven viaduct near Kirklevington. In Middlesbrough the Tees Transporter Bridge was closed due to high winds. The Ouse Bridge on the M62 motorway saw a portable building blow off the lorry transporting it, and led to tailbacks lasting for several hours on the M62. This was compounded in the City of Hull when a lorry overturned on to the central barriers from the southbound carriageway of the Humber Bridge blocking the two major arteries in and out of Hull and East Riding, Humberside police and Highways agency investigating incidents to identify potential driving offences, as the bridges were closed to high-sided vehicles at the time. Wind gusts of 128 km/h (80 mph) reported on the Norfolk coast as the storm moved towards continental Europe.

In London a woman received head injuries from a window panel which was blown out of the fifth floor of the London Bridge Hospital. 14 people were left homeless after high winds blew over half the roof off a block of flats in South Ockendon, Essex. Also in London the Old Father Time weathervane of Lord's Cricket Ground was bent over 90 degrees by the wind.

=== Netherlands ===
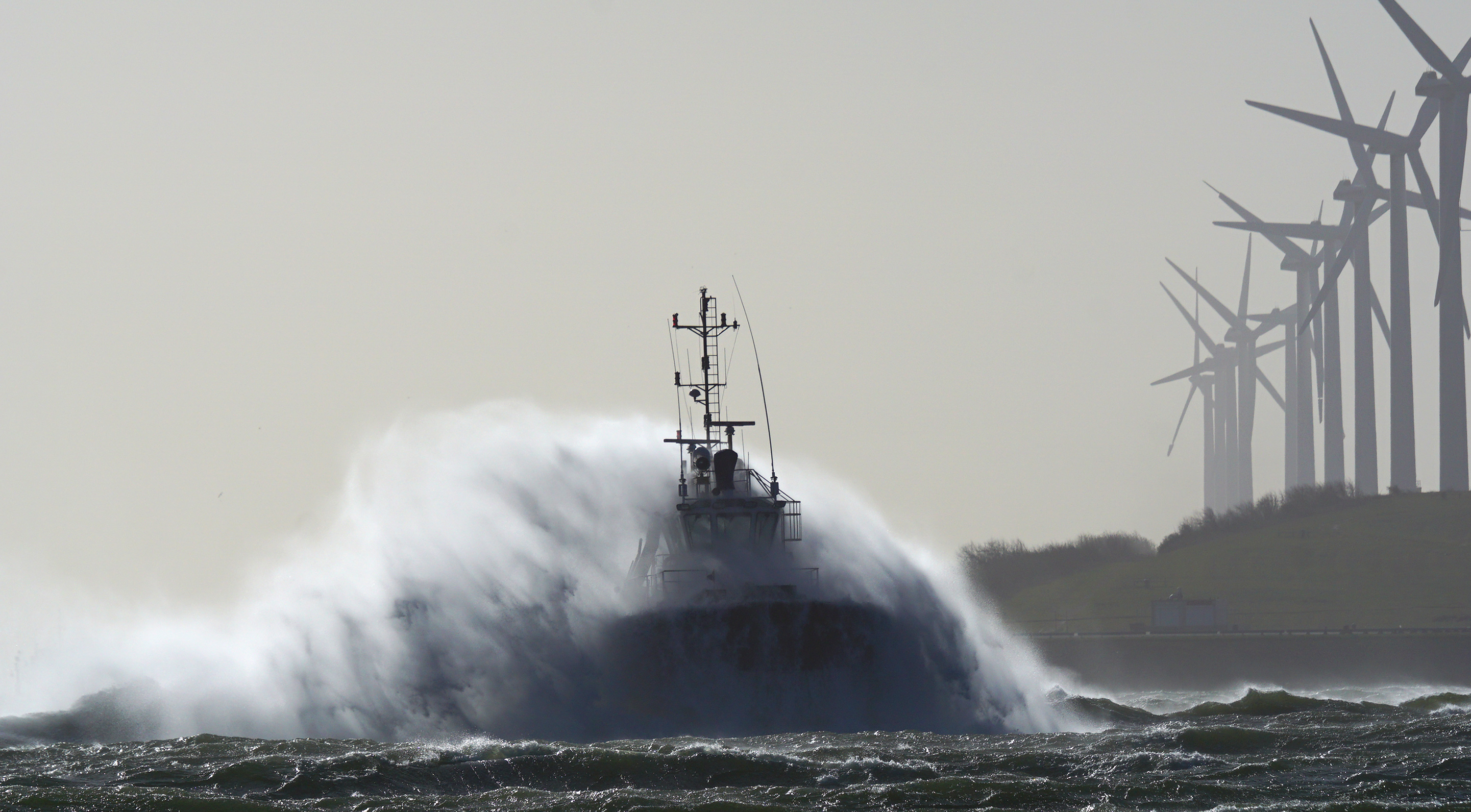
The Smit Elbe tug on the Nieuwe Waterweg during storm Niklas

KNMI issued orange alerts for Groningen, Friesland, the northern part of Drenthe and the Wadden Sea. In the Netherlands the storm brought serious handicaps in aviation and shipping. At Amsterdam's Schiphol airport 80 flights were cancelled. In Europe's largest port of Rotterdam two container terminals closed with ships remaining at sea waiting until the weather calmed down. The Maersk container ship MV Sea-Land Meteor ran aground near to Vlissingen during the storm before being refloated on the next high tide. Authorities later attributed the grounding to navigational error and low tides.

On the roads the A6 road was closed for some time near Sint Nicolaasga after a truck was blown over, this was repeated on the A1 motorway where traffic between Hengelo and Apeldoorn was restricted to the hard shoulder. The Dutch Traffic Information Service (Verkeersinformatiedienst) reported that some 25 trucks and trailers overturned on the main roads across the Netherlands, the most in one day since 2007, when the Kyrill (storm) saw 30 blown over in significantly stronger winds, though conditions were not as bad as during the Burns Day storm 25 January 1990 when 130 articulated lorries, caravans and trailers were blown over on major roads.

=== Germany ===
Many areas of Germany saw severe wind gusts 89–102 km/h (55–63 mph) A regional express Bayreuth-Nuernberg was severely damaged after hitting a fallen tree on the rail tracks near Pegnitz, Germany.

The roof of a school in Halberstadt was torn off in the high winds. The roof of the Lingner School sports hall in Jessen, Saxony-Anhalt was torn down by the storm.

=== Switzerland ===
In Switzerland preventative closure of railway lines, cable cars and upland areas taken out in preparation for the storm. Crap Masegn, Graubünden, with a peak of 165 km/h (103 mph) in the Alps, though even at lower elevations with gusts of 105.5 km/h (65.6 mph) recorded in Zürich. Zürich Airport was severely affected. One death related to the storm occurred in Switzerland.

=== Elsewhere ===
In Austria the storm brought more damage than was expected. In the Czech Republic the storm impacted transport particularly, on the railways a fallen tree derailed a train travelling between Olomouc and Opava. Numerous power outages occurred in the Czech Republic, and the fire brigade reported 14 times as more callouts than on an average day. Poland also saw some significant disruption, with the wind overturning trucks on major roads (near Magnice on National road 8 and the Wrocław bypass). In Belgium only 39 of the 200 participants of the Gent–Wevelgem cycle race finished the course as the peloton was disrupted by the wind.

== Casualties ==
As to Germany, nine deaths caused by the cyclone have been reported. Three persons where killed by trees falling on their cars, blown down by the storm. One man was killed by a concrete wall blown down by the storm, another one by a barn door that the storm tore off its hinges. Due to snow or hail accompanying the cyclone, four men where killed when drivers lost control over their cars.

Two more victims have been reported for Austria and Switzerland.

== Aftermath ==
The passage of the storm led to record production of renewable energy in several nations. In Germany Wind and solar power systems delivered on Monday afternoon for peak load time together nearly 44,000 This corresponds to an output of around 40 average large power plants. Wind turbines delivered 30,000 MW and solar 13,000 MW according to preliminary results released by breaking the previous record. The four German transmission system operators (Amprion, 50Hertz, TransnetBW and TenneT) published provisional figures of the cost to stabilise the German electricity grid were in the "lower to mid double-digit millions" range due to the storm.

In Austria, Austrian Power Grid AG (a 100% subsidiary of Verbund) reported that wind power of a capacity of 2001 MW was recorded on 31 March, the first time that the 2000 MW generation mark has been exceeded in the country. Turbines across the country were operating at about their maximum capacity due to the passage of the Niklas storm.

Initial estimates from insurers put the total economic loss from the storm as likely to range €1–2 billion.
