= Energy islands of Denmark =

Danish offshore wind farm projects

The energy islands of Denmark are two large-scale offshore wind farm projects that the government of Denmark is planning to establish, in the North Sea and the Baltic Sea respectively, by 2030. In the North Sea, an artificial island will be constructed with the capacity to be a hub for up to 3 GW of offshore wind farms initially, and potentially up to 10 GW in the future. The artificial island may take the form of a sand island, steel platforms, or a large container lowered into place and filled with stone material, and would be located approximately 80 kilometres (50 mi) west of Jutland, at a water depth of 26–27 metres (85–89 ft). In the Baltic Sea, a hub will be built on the natural island of Bornholm that will be able to serve up to 3 GW of offshore wind farms.

The project will be the largest construction project in Denmark's history and will increase the country's total offshore wind energy capacity fourfold if the initial phase is completed or sevenfold if fully expanded. As of 2024, the completion is planned for 2036 at cost of $30 billion.

== Background ==
In June 2016, Dutch electrical grid operator TenneT first presented its vision for the construction of a large European electricity system in the North Sea, based on a "hub and spoke" architecture, with international submarine power cables to participating countries forming the spokes, and a centrally built artificial island connected to large offshore wind farms forming the hub. In February 2017, a study commissioned by TenneT reported that as much as 110 GW of wind energy generating capacity could ultimately be developed at Dogger Bank in the North Sea.

At the North Seas Energy Forum in Brussels in March 2017, TenneT Netherlands, TenneT Germany, and the Danish grid operator Energinet signed a trilateral agreement to cooperate in the further development of one or more "power link islands" in the North Sea under the auspices of the North Sea Wind Power Hub consortium. In February 2019, the consortium published two reports establishing a foundation for their planning: a spatial planning report and a cost evaluation report.

In June 2019, after the 2019 Danish general election, a new governing coalition was formed in Denmark between the Social Democrats, the Social Liberal Party, the Socialist People's Party, and the Red–Green Alliance. As part of the coalition agreement, the new government committed to pursue the establishment of an offshore energy island with a minimum capacity of 10 GW by the year 2030.

In June 2020, a broad majority of the Danish Parliament, including the government coalition parties and opposition parties Venstre, Danish People's Party, The Conservative People's Party, Liberal Alliance and The Alternative, collectively representing 171 out of the 179 members of the parliament, agreed to begin the establishment of two energy island hubs with a total capacity of 5 GW, scheduled for completion by 2030: one on the island of Bornholm with a capacity of 2 GW, and one in the North Sea with a capacity of 3 GW.

== North Sea ==
Area designated for preliminary studies for placement of the energy island in the North Sea.

In March 2017, TenneT Netherlands, TenneT Germany and Energinet signed an agreement for the development of a large-scale, trans-European system for renewable energy in the North Sea with the potential to supply as many as 100 million European citizens with renewable energy by the year 2050. According to the three companies, establishing an artificial power link island at a location such as Dogger Bank would have many advantages: the site offers wind conditions and shallow water depths optimal for the operation of offshore wind turbines. A power link island would enable near-shore connections and thus reduce costs at the otherwise far offshore location holding a potential for as much as 100 GW of wind energy generation. It would be possible to distribute the generated wind energy via direct current cable connections to all countries bordering the North Sea: the Netherlands, Denmark, Germany, the United Kingdom, Norway and Belgium. And finally, these same cables could also serve as interconnectors between the energy markets of the involved countries, allowing the countries to buy and sell electricity through them.

According to the Danish Ministry of Climate, Energy and Utilities, the potential size of a project so far out at sea would make it possible to produce green energy at a previously unseen scale. This could help balance the variability of supply that the connected countries might otherwise experience from their own sources of renewable energy. The electricity from the island could also potentially be converted to electrofuels via Power-to-X technologies for use in industries that cannot use electricity from renewables directly. An analysis conducted by the ministry found that an island with 10 GW of power generation capacity would be able to produce enough renewable fuel to fully supply all ships and airplanes that refuel in Denmark.

=== Political agreement ===
In February 2021, the Danish Parliament reached a deal on the basic framework for the construction of an energy island in the North Sea. The project will be the largest construction project in Denmark's history with an estimated total cost of kr. 210 billion, equivalent to about five times the cost of the Great Belt Fixed Link. Initially, the island will have a capacity for 3 GW of wind power, enough to power about 3 million European households. In the longer term, it will be possible to expand the island to a capacity of 10 GW, corresponding to the power needs of about 10 million households. The facility will be designated as critical infrastructure and the state will be required to retain a majority stake in its ownership, while one or more private investors must hold a minority stake. The electrical transmission system between the island and adjacent countries will be constructed and owned by Energinet and relevant international partners.

The island is to be designed so it is possible to install facilities both for storing energy received on the island and for converting it into fuel products for use in shipping, aviation, industry and heavy-duty vehicles. With the initial capacity, it is expected the island will have a total area of at least 120,000 square metres (1,300,000 sq ft), equivalent to the area of about 18 standard football pitches. If expanded to the full 10 GW of capacity, the island is expected to reach a total area of 460,000 square metres (5,000,000 sq ft), equivalent to about 64 football pitches. Depending on the outcome of the procurement, in the initial phase, the surrounding wind farm could consist of as many as 200 very large wind turbines, each with an expected height of over 260 metres (850 ft). If expanded to full capacity, the number of wind turbines could increase to a total of 650.

In July 2021, the Danish Energy Agency submitted a proposal for a law on the design and construction of the energy island in the North Sea on the basis of the political agreement to public consultation. To keep up with industry development, the Agency considers a turbine height up to 500 m (1,600 ft), equivalent to 62 MW per turbine.

In September 2021, political agreement was reached on additional provisions of the framework in preparation of the tender for the island. It was decided that the project is to be organized as a corporation in which the state owns at least 50.1% of the shares while a private partner owns at most 49.9% of the shares. The private partner and the concrete design and execution of the project will both be chosen in one overall tender. It will thus be up to private investors, developers and other relevant parties to come together to form suitable bids for the whole project. It was also decided that it should be possible for bidders to define spaces on the island that can be flexibly rented out for innovative commercial purposes such as energy storage, Power-to-X generation or data center operations. Profits from the project are to be divided between the state and the private partner according to the size of their stakes in the corporation.

In October 2021, the proposed law on the design and construction of the energy island in the North Sea was put to the Danish Parliament by the Minister for Climate, Energy and Utilities Dan Jørgensen. On 25 November 2021, the proposal was voted into law by the parliament with 98 votes in favor and 4 votes against.

=== Preliminary studies ===
In November 2020, Danish parliamentarians agreed to initiate preparatory investigations in a wide area of consideration in the North Sea for the location of a power link island and 3 GW of connected offshore wind farms. The installations would be located at least 60 kilometres (37 mi) west of Thorsminde on Denmark’s west coast. In February 2021, the parliamentarians agreed to narrow the area to a location approximately 80 kilometres (50 mi) from the coast.

In April 2021, Energinet awarded the companies Fugro and MMT assignments to conduct geophysical surveys of the seabed in the area of consideration to a depth of 100 metres below the sea floor. The first survey ship began work in May 2021. In August 2022, Energinet contracted COWI to produce an integrated geological model on the basis of surveys of the site.

In June 2021, the company Intertek announced that it had been commissioned by Energinet to undertake constraints analysis, consenting advice, and cable route and landfall assessments for the energy island in the North Sea. In January 2022, Energinet awarded Fugro with a contract to conduct cable route surveys between the future site of the island and potential landfalls in Denmark. In April 2022, Energinet recommended that the power cable from the island be connected to the Danish electrical grid through a facility already being built for the Viking Link cable at Revsing in Vejen Municipality, Jutland. In August 2022, the company Ramboll was awarded a contract by Energinet to assess external threats, risks and sufficient burial depths for the island's subsea cable.

In September 2021, Energinet awarded the company Niras an assignment to conduct environmental studies of the area of consideration for the North Sea energy island until 2024.

In May 2022, Ramboll announced that it had been commissioned by Energinet to develop a conceptual design for the electrical infrastructure for the island. In February 2023, Energinet issued a tender call for a ten-year contract for technical consultancy services related to the procurement and commissioning of the electrical infrastructure of the island.

=== Procurement ===
Throughout 2021, the Danish Energy Agency conducted market dialogues with relevant commercial operators about the procurement framework for the artificial island in the North Sea. In 2022, the agency conducted a dialogue with potential bidders to clarify their need for geotechnical investigations of the future site of the project. In April 2023, the agency began a market dialogue regarding the technical requirements for the surrounding offshore wind farms and their connections to the island.

In June 2021, the Danish Energy Agency awarded Sweco Danmark a four-year contract to provide technical advice and assistance in preparation of the tender for the island. Sweco has been involved in other public construction projects in Denmark previously, including in the establishment of the artificial island Peberholm in the strait of Øresund. In August 2022, Sweco was selected as advisor by the agency for the next 9 years.

More than 20 market actors have participated in the preparatory dialogues with the Danish Energy Agency so far. The following parties have publicly expressed interest in bidding on the upcoming tender:

- In May 2020, the VindØ consortium announced that it was planning a bid for the construction and operation of the North Sea energy island. The consortium consists of the Danish pension funds PensionDanmark and PFA Pension, regional grid operator Andel, and financial services firm Nykredit. The fund management company Copenhagen Infrastructure Partners (CIP) is the developer of the project. The consortium has commissioned Ramboll to provide high-level support for the project. Ramboll will study the possibilities for establishing large-scale Power-to-X facilities on the island for converting power to products such as hydrogen and ammonia for use in industry and shipping as well as facilities for local energy storage such as batteries. Because the industrial processes on the island are expected to generate significant amounts of heat, possibly enough to supply entire cities, options for utilizing this by-product are also being examined. Ramboll will also study the feasibility of running a data center on the island, given the availability of green energy at the location and the island's potential proximity to international data cables in the North Sea, as well as the options for the island's port, which could potentially be offered for use to third parties such as fishing vessels, maritime authorities etc. Finally, the company will look at the possibilities for accommodation and recreational areas for the island's inhabitants. In November 2021, CIP announced that it had signed a partnership agreement to develop the bid with a group of construction companies known as the NJORD Group, consisting of Acciona, Boskalis, DEME and MT Højgaard International. The group will be advised by the engineering consultancy company Niras, while COWI will act as owner's engineer on the project. In June 2022, PensionDanmark announced that the energy company Shell plc had signed a memorandum of understanding to join the consortium in order to enter a collaboration to produce green hydrogen on the island. In May 2023, Shell formally joined the consortium.
- In April 2021, Danish energy company Ørsted and the pension fund ATP announced that they were planning a bid for the construction and operation of the North Sea energy island. The companies said they would study the optimal integration of Power-to-X on the island. In September 2021, the two companies announced that they were bringing on board the construction companies Aarsleff, Bouygues and Van Oord as partners for their bid. In March 2022, the consortium presented its concept for an energy island called "North Sea Energy Island" based on a relatively small fixed central island, built by land reclamation, that can be expanded indefinitely with flexible modular platforms built onshore and transported by sea for connection to the central island as need arises and removed again or replaced when no longer needed. According to the consortium, this modular model can both be deployed faster than a large, non-modular island, be more easily upgraded beyond the planned 10 GW of capacity, and be more easily adapted to accommodate rapidly changing green energy technologies. In May 2022, the consortium announced that it had appointed Arup Group as technical advisor for the project. In June 2022, the consortium announced that it had signed an agreement with data network infrastructure provider GlobalConnect to make the island a "cross-border digital hub", stating that it offered a natural intersection for the future data communications grid of the North Sea countries.

The Danish Energy Agency has said that further work will focus on a flexible island concept that combines a fixed reclaimed island with movable modular platforms, while leaving room to innovate on the island after it has been built. Under this model, the fixed island could feature a harbour, equipment for transmission of electricity, and areas for operations and accommodation, while facilities for Power-to-X might be placed on adjacent platforms.

In June 2023, the Danish Ministry of Climate, Energy and Utilities postponed the tender until later in 2023 in order to analyze more options, citing the cost of the concept as envisioned at the time.

In 2024 the project was further delayed, with Belgium exiting the project and Germany declaring intent to join it. The estimated cost at this stage is $30 billion with estimated completion date of 2036.

=== International partnerships ===
Since December 2020, the governments of the Netherlands, Germany, Belgium and Luxembourg have all entered agreements with the government of Denmark to increase cooperation with respect to the expansion of offshore wind energy, including potentially the energy island in the North Sea.

In February 2021, Belgian transmission system operator Elia and Energinet announced that they had signed an agreement to assess the feasibility of a hybrid interconnector between Belgium and Denmark via the North Sea island by the end of 2021. The preliminary assessment found that the project would be technologically challenging, but feasible. In November 2021, Belgian Minister of Energy Tinne Van der Straeten and Danish Minister for Climate, Energy and Utilities Dan Jørgensen signed a memorandum of agreement to establish a connection between Belgium and Denmark via the Danish energy island in the North Sea. Elia and Energinet also signed an agreement to cooperate on the development of the project. The interconnector would be named TritonLink and would cover a distance of more than 600 kilometres (370 mi) between the two countries.

In May 2022, the energy ministers of Germany, the Netherlands, Belgium and Denmark signed an agreement for the establishment of the island with 3 GW of wind power and connections to Belgium and Denmark by 2033, expansion of the island's capacity to 10 GW by 2040, and preparations for additional connections to Germany and the Netherlands. The ministers of the Netherlands and Denmark also signed a bilateral agreement to jointly develop a concept for either an electricity interconnector or a hydrogen pipeline between the island and a future energy hub in the Dutch North Sea and potentially connections to the United Kingdom and Norway, with a view towards realization in 2035.

In December 2022, Elia and Energinet announced a joint tender for consultancy services related to the development of the TritonLink interconnector. According to the tender contract notice, the link would connect the high-voltage grids of Belgium and Denmark via the Danish energy island in the North Sea and a separate energy island to be built in the Belgian North Sea (Princess Elisabeth Island).

In April 2023, the governments of Germany, the Netherlands, Belgium and Denmark agreed to develop an interconnected system of energy islands and clusters in the North Sea by the mid-2030s on the basis of work conducted by the nations' grid operators. Germany and Denmark additionally agreed to investigate possibilities for connecting Denmark's energy island in the North Sea to a 10 GW offshore wind power hub in the German North Sea. The German transmission system operator Amprion and Energinet subsequently announced that they had signed a memorandum of understanding to explore possibilities for establishing a hybrid interconnector between the island and an offshore wind grid in the German North Sea. The governments of the United Kingdom and Denmark signed a memorandum of understanding to assess the possibilities for connecting the island to the United Kingdom as well. Belgium and Denmark also agreed to assess the possibilities for establishing another interconnector between the two countries after 2033, in addition to the already agreed TritonLink connection.

== Baltic Sea ==
Area designated for preliminary studies for placement of the energy island in the Baltic Sea.

In November 2019, the Danish energy company Ørsted proposed making the natural island Bornholm in the Baltic Sea the center point of an already envisioned electricity interconnection between Poland and Denmark, and gradually building out up to 3–5 GW of offshore wind capacity on the sandbank Rønne Banke off the coast of the island, thus forming an energy hub as proposed by the North Sea Wind Power Hub consortium in the Baltic Sea, albeit on a natural island rather than an artificial one. In addition to Poland, the hub could also eventually be connected to Germany and Sweden.

=== Political agreement ===
In August 2022, the Danish Parliament agreed to increase the capacity of the proposed Baltic Sea energy island wind farm to 3 GW from the previously planned 2 GW. Under the agreement, the wind turbines will be placed 15–45 kilometres (9.3–28.0 mi) from the coast of Bornholm. A 245 kilometres (152 mi) long subsea power cable with a capacity of 1.2 GW will be installed to connect the hub on Bornholm to the Danish mainland on Zealand. The government will also work to connect the hub to the local grid on Bornholm, and in the longer term it should be possible to connect technologies for energy storage and Power-to-X. The project is estimated to require investments of €9 billion, including €3 billion for the electrical infrastructure and €6 billion for the construction of the wind farm, and is expected to be able to produce enough energy to power up to around 4.5 million European households when it begins operation in 2030. In May 2023, the Danish Parliament reached an agreement to fund the project on the government budget up to a limit of kr. 17.6 billion over 20 years.

=== Preliminary studies ===
In November 2020, Danish parliamentarians chose two areas in the Baltic Sea, approximately 20 kilometres (12 mi) south and southwest, respectively, off the island of Bornholm, for the development of 2 GW of offshore wind farms for the project. In October 2021, the Danish Energy Agency announced that it had instructed Energinet to expand the area of consideration and investigate the possibility of increasing the capacity of the proposed Baltic Sea energy island wind farm to 3 GW from the previous 2 GW.

In April 2021, Energinet awarded the company GEOxyz an assignment to conduct geophysical surveys of the seabed in the area of consideration. The first survey ship began work in August 2021. In August 2022, Energinet contracted the company Ramboll to produce an integrated geological model on the basis of surveys of the site.

In April 2021, Energinet also hired Ramboll to map possible routes and landing locations for submerged power cables between the Baltic Sea energy island and adjacent countries. In January 2022, Energinet awarded the company MMT with a contract to conduct cable route surveys for the Baltic Sea energy island. In August 2022, the company Primo Marine was awarded a contract by Energinet to assess external threats, risks and sufficient burial depths for the island's subsea cable.

In September 2021, Energinet awarded Ramboll an assignment to conduct environmental studies of the area of consideration for the Baltic Sea energy island until 2024. In March 2022, Energinet announced that it was initiating environmental field investigations on the islands of Bornholm and Zealand in areas being considered for the establishment of high voltage stations and underground cables in connection to the Baltic Sea energy island.

=== Procurement ===
In March 2022, Energinet submitted an application to establish the project's electrical infrastructure on and between Bornholm and Zealand to the Danish Ministry of Climate, Energy and Utilities. In October 2022, the Minister for Climate, Energy and Utilities Dan Jørgensen approved the application.

In the latter half of 2022, the Danish Energy Agency and Energinet conducted market dialogues with potential tenderers and relevant industry associations regarding the Baltic Sea energy island.

In May 2023, German transmission system operator 50Hertz and Energinet launched a market dialogue regarding the establishment of the cable connections between Bornholm and the German and Danish mainlands.

=== International partnerships ===
In December 2020, the governments of Germany and Denmark entered an agreement to work closer together on the expansion of offshore wind energy, including potentially the energy island in the Baltic Sea.

In January 2021, German transmission system operator 50Hertz and Energinet announced that they had signed an agreement to assess the feasibility of a hybrid interconnector between Germany and Denmark via the Baltic Sea island by the end of 2021. In November 2021, 50Hertz and Energinet signed an agreement to begin formal feasibility studies of the project.

In July 2022, the governments of Germany and Denmark signed a memorandum of understanding to jointly build the interconnector, including a substation on Bornholm and a 470 kilometres (290 mi) long subsea cable with a capacity of 2 GW from the substation to Germany. Both countries will contribute funding to the project and receive shares of the energy it produces. In November 2022, 50Hertz and Energinet expanded their existing cooperation agreement with new agreements regarding ownership and costs, among other things. In June 2023, the governments of Germany and Denmark entered a legally binding agreement on the implementation of the project.

== See also ==
- North Sea Wind Power Hub
- Princess Elisabeth Island
- Wind power in Denmark
