= European Power Exchange =

Company operating markets for electricity

European Power Exchange SE
- EPEX SPOT SE
- Type: Physical commodity exchange (energy)
- Location: Paris, France
- Founded: 2008
- Key people: Jean-François Conil-Lacoste (CEO), Jonas Törnquist (COO)
- Currency: EUR
- Commodities: Electric power
- Volume: 868 TWh (2024)
- Website: www.epexspot.com

European Power Exchange (EPEX SPOT) SE is a European electric power exchange operating in Austria, Belgium, Denmark, Finland, France, Germany, Great Britain, Luxembourg, the Netherlands, Norway, Poland, Sweden and Switzerland.

EPEX SPOT SE is a company under European law based in Paris (France) with offices in Amsterdam (the Netherlands), Berlin (Germany), Bern (Switzerland), Brussels (Belgium), London (United Kingdom), and Vienna (Austria). It operates the power spot markets for short-term trading in Austria, Belgium, Denmark, Finland, France, Germany, Great Britain, Luxembourg, the Netherlands, Norway, Poland, Sweden and Switzerland. EPEX SPOT was founded in 2008 by the merger of the power spot markets of the energy exchanges Powernext and European Energy Exchange (EEX AG). Today, EPEX SPOT is held by EEX AG (51%) and Transmission System Operators. The transmission system operators are organized in the holding HGRT composed of Amprion, APG, RTE, Elia, Swissgrid and TenneT, which holds a share of 49% in EPEX SPOT. In 2015, EPEX SPOT integrated its business with former APX Group, which operated the power spot markets in Belgium (through Belpex), the Netherlands and the United Kingdom. In 2020, EPEX SPOT launched its Day-Ahead and Intraday markets in the Nordic region.

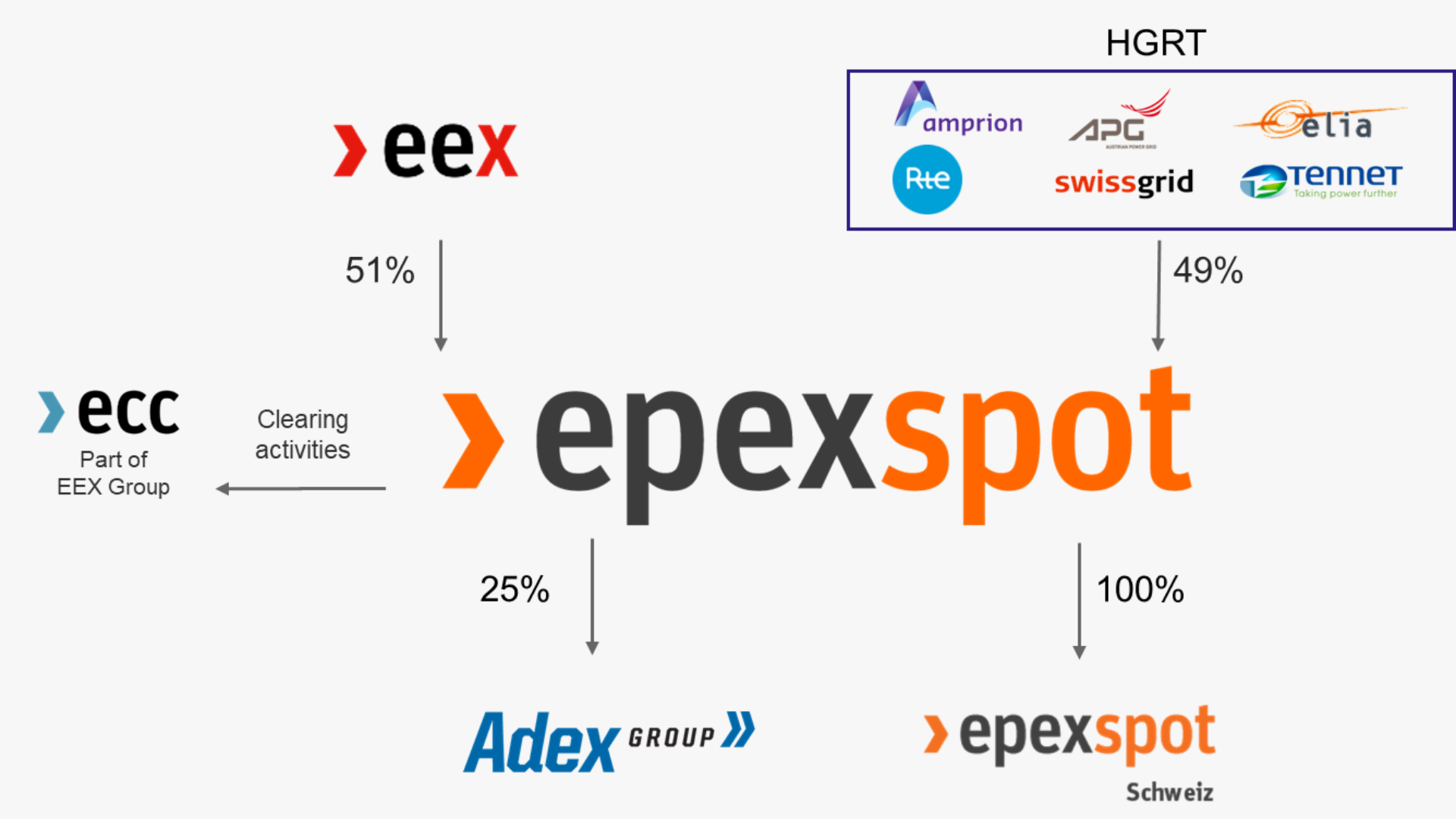
EPEX SPOT Shareholder Structure

EPEX SPOT is one of the stakeholders in the European Single Day-Ahead Coupling which currently connects markets representing 95% of the European power consumption. EPEX SPOT also provides services to Hungarian Power Exchange HUPX and to the Irish Power Exchange SEMOpx. Moreover, EPEX SPOT provides price coupling services for three of the four power exchanges of the 4M Market Coupling covering the Czech Republic, Hungary, Slovakia and Romania. EPEX SPOT counts over 300 members and about 200 employees.

== Governance ==
EPEX SPOT SE is a company with a two-tier governance system. The shareholders appoint a Supervisory Board, composed of actors of the European energy sector, which elects the Management Board and approves the strategy of the company. The Supervisory Board supports EPEX SPOT's work on the integration of the European power market and takes into account the increasing number of collaborations of European and international scale.

An Exchange Council composed of market participants has been put in place as an independent body in order to ensure state of the art governance rules. 26 members and 4 permanent guests meeting up quarterly represent adequately the diversity of economic and corporate profiles that exists among the Exchange Members from various sectors. EPEX SPOT holds 100% subsidiaries in Switzerland, EPEX SPOT Schweiz AG.

== Trading ==
In 2024 the volume of traded electricity on the markets of EPEX SPOT amounted to 868 terawatt hours (TWh).

=== Day-ahead markets ===
EPEX SPOT operates day-ahead power markets for Austria, Belgium, Denmark, Finland, France, Germany, Luxemburg, Great Britain, the Netherlands, Norway, Poland, Sweden and Switzerland. These Day-Ahead markets are organised through an auction process, matching once a day supply and demand curves and thus fixing prices in an anonymous, yet transparent and secured manner. Members of the Exchange enter their orders for hourly quantities of power into the order book which is closed on 11 am for Switzerland and on 12 pm for all other markets. EPEX SPOT calculates the offer and demand curves and their intersection for each hour of the following day. Results are published from 9.30 am GMT (Great Britain), 11.10 am (Switzerland) and 12.55 pm (all other markets).

=== Market Coupling ===
The Central-Western European countries, except for Great Britain and Switzerland, and the markets of the Nordic countries are connected through a mechanism called Market Coupling. It links the electricity markets of the member countries by a price coupling solution in order to optimize the use of cross-border capacities between these countries, increasing the gains in social welfare on all markets.

=== Intraday markets ===
EPEX SPOT also operates intraday power markets for Austria, Belgium, Denmark, Finland, France, Germany-Luxemburg, Great Britain, the Netherlands, Norway, Sweden and Switzerland. The Intraday markets are organized by continuous trading – orders of the members are entered perpetually into the order book. As soon as two orders match, the trade is executed. Contracts for hourly, half-hourly and quarter-hourly quantities of power can be traded up to 5 minutes before delivery. The Intraday trading system used by EPEX SPOT, M7, allows simultaneous cross-border trades on the Exchange and via OTC. The continuous Intraday markets of EPEX SPOT, except for Great Britain and Switzerland, are coupled through the pan-European Single Intraday Coupling.

=== Flexibility contracts and Intraday auctions ===
In December 2011, EPEX SPOT introduced 15-minute contracts on the continuous Intraday market in Germany. These contracts facilitate trading with intermittent power sources and help dealing with intra-hour variations in production and consumption. With the launch of the Intraday market in Switzerland, 15-minute contracts were extended to this market.

In December 2014, EPEX SPOT launched a call auction for 15-minute contracts on the German Intraday market in order to provide a reliable price signal on a quarter-hour basis. This auction at 3 pm CET provides at tool for balance responsible parties to fine-tune their portfolios on a 15-minute basis during production ramps and forecast deviations. In so doing, the price signal of 15-minute contracts contributes to the added value of flexibility and provides at the same time incentives for system stabilization. In 2017, EPEX SPOT introduced 30-minute contracts on the French, German and Swiss continuous intraday market, enabling local and implicit cross-border trades on the respective borders. These contracts are designed to manage emerging flexibility challenges of power markets more efficiently and help market participants to fulfill their balance requirements towards the French transmission system operator. EPEX SPOT has been offering additional Intraday auctions in Austria, Belgium, and France since 2020, in Great Britain since 2018 and in Switzerland since 2019.

== Integration with APX Group ==
In April 2015, EPEX SPOT and former APX Group announced the integration of their businesses in order to form a Power Exchange for Central Western Europe, encompassing at the time Austria, Belgium, Germany, France, Luxembourg, the Netherlands, Switzerland and the UK. The integration of EPEX SPOT and APX Group reduced barriers in power trading in the CWE and UK region. Market participants benefit from harmonised trading systems, one single rulebook and one admission process for the entire region, therefore reducing trading costs and lowering entry barriers for new participants. Moreover, they have access to a wider range of products and benefit from best-of-both standards and reliable customer support. Overall, the integration led to a more effective governance and further facilitated the creation of a single European power market fully in line with the objectives of the European electricity regulatory framework. Since 31 December 2016, all former APX Group entities act under the EPEX SPOT name.

== See also ==
- Nord Pool
- European Energy Exchange
