= North Sea Wind Power Hub =

Proposed artificial island near England

Coordinates: 55.4°N 4.0°E

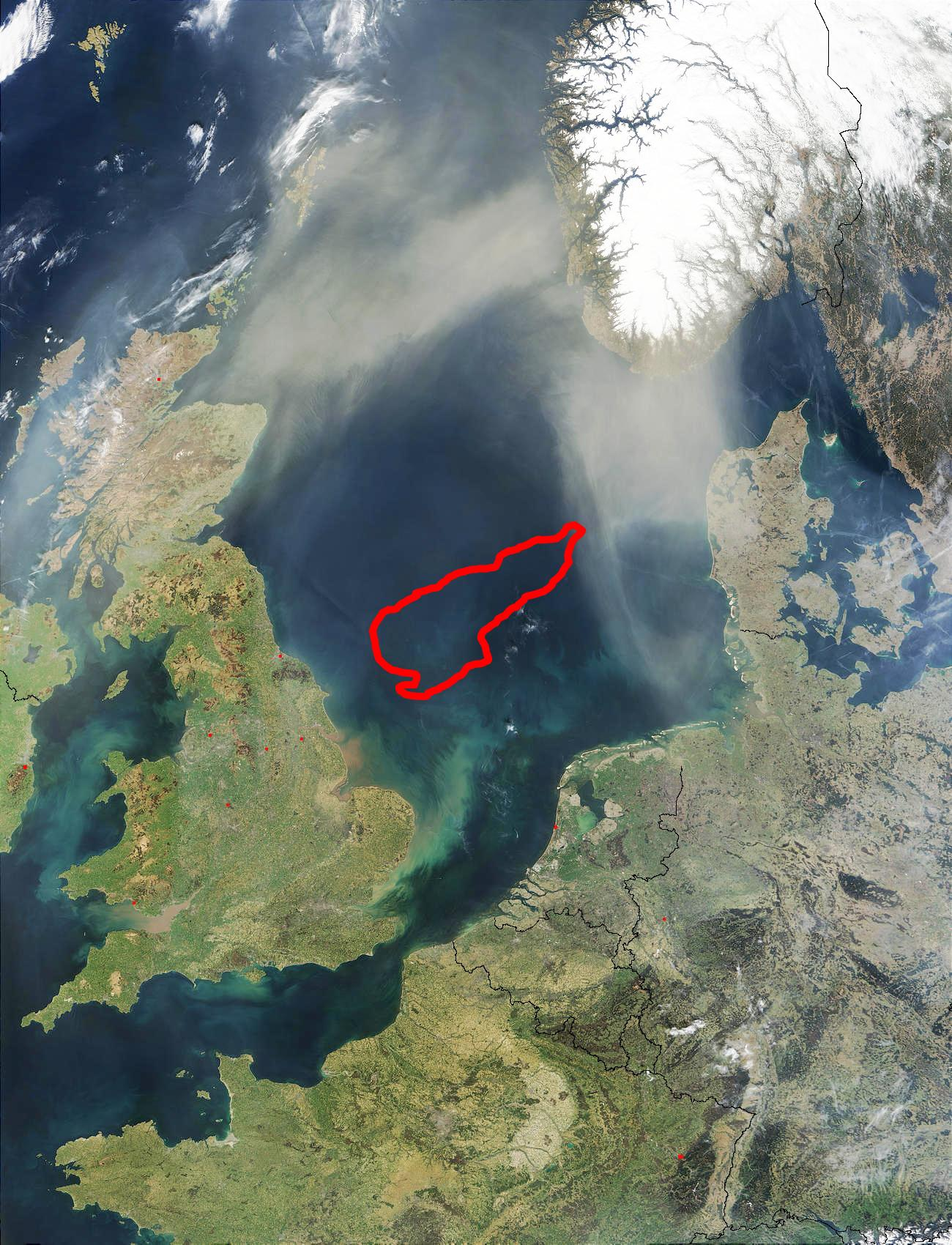
Satellite photo showing the Dogger Bank (red) (NASA)

North Sea Wind Power Hub is a proposed energy island complex to be built in the middle of the North Sea as part of a European system for sustainable electricity. One or more “Power Link” artificial islands will be created at the northeast end of the Dogger Bank, a relatively shallow area in the North Sea, just outside the continental shelf of the United Kingdom and near the point where the borders between the territorial waters of Netherlands, Germany, and Denmark come together, on what has now been named, Princess Elisabeth Island. Dutch, German, and Danish electrical grid operators are cooperating in this project to help develop a cluster of offshore wind parks with a capacity of several gigawatts, with interconnections to the North Sea countries. Undersea cables will make international trade in electricity possible.

According to this plan, the first artificial island will have an area of six square kilometres (2.3 sq mi). Thousands of wind turbines will be placed around the island, with short alternating-current links to the island. On the island itself, power converters will change the alternating current to direct current that will be carried to the mainland via undersea cables. The Hub – one island at first, and later one or two more – is intended to make a substantial contribution to the energy transition and to achieving the goals of the Paris Climate Agreement of 2015. The project is to be completed around 2050.

In June 2016, nine countries – the Netherlands, Germany, Belgium, Luxemburg, France, Denmark, Ireland, Norway, and Sweden – signed an agreement to cooperate in planning and building offshore wind parks. The goal is to reduce costs as quickly as possible and thus make the wind parks more economically viable.

A study commissioned by Dutch electrical grid operator TenneT reported in February 2017 that as much as 110 gigawatts of wind energy generating capacity could ultimately be developed at the Dogger Bank location.

== North Sea Wind Power Hub Consortium ==
At the North Seas Energy Forum in Brussels on 23 March 2017, TenneT Netherlands, TenneT Germany, and the Danish Energinet.dk signed a trilateral agreement to cooperate in further development of the project. These network managers hope that Norway, the United Kingdom, and Belgium will also join them.

In September 2017, Dutch gas-grid operator Gasunie joined the consortium, suggesting converting wind power to gas and using near offshore gas infrastructure for storage and transport.

In November 2017, the Port of Rotterdam became the fifth member of the consortium.

In February 2019, the consortium published two reports establishing a foundation for their planning: a spatial planning report and a cost evaluation report. This was followed in May 2019 by a report concerning the possibility for extension into the Norwegian sector.

== See also ==
- Energy islands of Denmark
- Princess Elisabeth Island
- North Sea Offshore Grid
