= Princess Elisabeth Island =

Belgian artificial island in the North Sea

Coordinates: 51°30′36″N 2°29′30″E

Prinses-Elisabetheiland
- Interactive map of Princess Elisabeth Island

Geography
- Location: North Sea
- Type: Artificial island
- Area: 6 ha (15 acres)

Administration
- Belgium

Princess Elisabeth Island (Dutch: Prinses-Elisabetheiland) is an artificial island under construction in the North Sea, with an area of six hectares. Construction of the island began in 2024, and is expected to be completed by 2028.

It is named after Princess Elisabeth, Duchess of Brabant. It is located 45 kilometres off the coast of Ostend, Belgium. Construction costs are estimated at €3.6 billion.

In 2025 and 2026, caissons were installed at the Princess Elisabeth Island (PEI) in the Belgian North Sea. A team of more than 300 people and a fleet of 15 specialized vessels (including jack-up vessels, supply vessels, and tugboats) were involved. The caissons, massive concrete structures weighing up to 22,000 tons, form the outer walls of the future PEI. The project was developed by Elia Transmission Belgium (ELIA) and is being built by TM Edison, a consortium including DEME and Jan De Nul.

In June 2025, the construction of the PEI was stopped. Between 2021 and 2025, the estimated production costs nearly quadrupled: from 2.2 to about 8 billion euros. The Belgian Electricity and Gas Market Regulatory Authority (CREG) detailing the reasons for the project’s cost overruns. The federal government now planned to provide up to three billion €.

In September 2026, the European Investment Bank (EIB) is granting the project developer ELIA an additional loan of one billion euros. According to the EIB, this is the largest credit line ever granted for a single energy project. The first loan amounted to 650 million euros. Elia estimates the total cost of the first construction phase of the island at 3.6 billion euros.

== See also ==
- North Sea Wind Power Hub
- Energy islands of Denmark
