= Jan De Nul =

Belgian marine construction company

Jan De Nul Group (Sofidra S.A.)
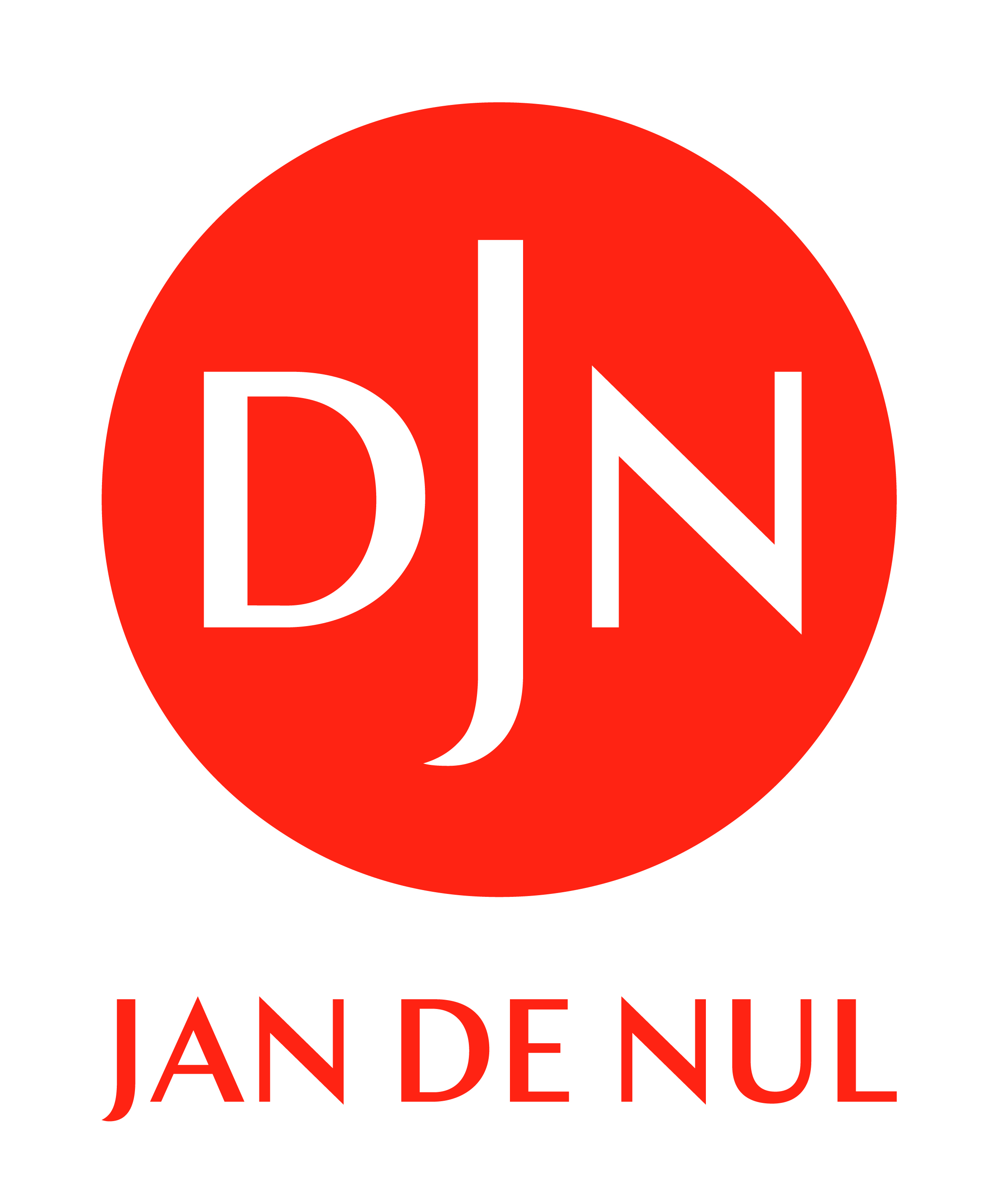
- Type: Private
- Industry: Offshore Energy, Dredging Solutions, Construction Projects, Planet Redevelopment
- Founded: 1938
- Founder: Jan De Nul
- Headquarters: Aalst, Belgium and Capellen, Luxembourg
- Area served: Worldwide
- Key people: Julie De Nul (CEO); JPJ De Nul (Chairman); Dirk De Nul (Director)
- Revenue: ▲€ 4.24 billion (2025)
- Operating income: ▲€ 812 million (2025)
- Net income: ▲€ 458 million (2025)
- Number of employees: 8,848 (2025)
- Website: www.jandenul.com

Jan De Nul Group is a family-owned company, originally from Belgium, with a financial headquarters in Luxembourg. Its four main activities are Offshore Energy, Dredging Solutions, Construction Projects and Planet Redevelopment.

== History ==
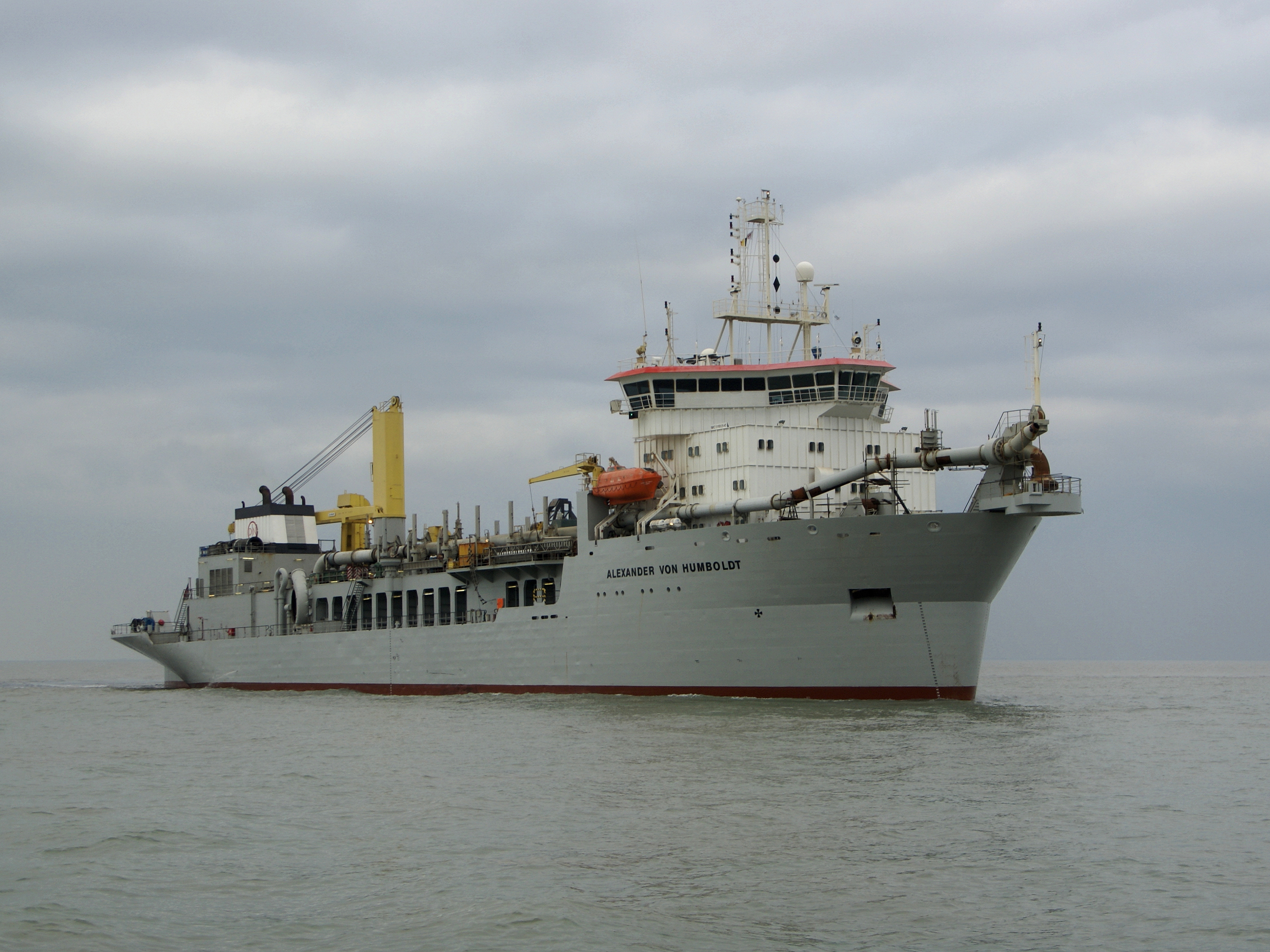
The trailing suction hopper dredger Alexander von Humboldt

Founded in 1938 in Hofstade, near Aalst, Belgium, Jan De Nul started as a construction company specialised in civil engineering works. It was only in 1951 that the company entered into the dredging business by acquiring its first cutter suction dredger 'Jan Pieter I'. In the 1990s, it entered the offshore energy market and the environmental remediation industry. Since 2012, the company has forayed into offshore renewable energy business, including European wind energy projects.

At the end of 2025, Jan De Nul had 8,848 employees and a yearly turnover of 4.24 billion euro. Other major dredging companies are Dutch companies Royal Boskalis and Royal Van Oord, and the Belgian DEME.

Early 2025, Jan De Nul rebranded into World Builders.

Jan De Nul was voted the most attractive employer in Belgium in 2008 and 2009.

== Fleet ==
Jan De Nul has a fleet of 95 vessels, including 29 trailing suction hopper dredgers (with 1 more under construction), 11 cutter suction dredgers, 15 split hopper barges, 6 backhoe dredgers, 5 water injection dredgers, 6 offshore rock installation vessels, 3 trenching support vessels, 2 offshore jack-up installation vessels, 3 cable installation vessels (with 2 more under construction), 3 heavy lift vessels, and 1 oil recovery vessel.

It also has a fleet of heavy equipment, including 77 dump trucks, 191 tracked excavators, 32 tower cranes, 64 bulldozers, 71 wheel loaders, etc.

Records

Largest hopper dredgers: TSHD 'Cristóbal Colón' and 'Leiv Eiriksson', capacity of 46,000 m^{3}, maximum dredging depth of 155 m

Largest rock installation vessels: FPV 'Simon Stevin' and 'Joseph Plateau' with a capacity of 31,500 tonnes, rock installation possible in depths of up to 2,000 m

Largest cable laying vessel: CLV 'Isaac Newton', - combined turn table capacity of 12,400 tonnes (2 larger vessels are on order, the 'William Thomson' and 'Fleeming Jenkin', with a capacity of 29,500 tonnes, to be delivered in 2026)

Largest cutter dredger: CSD 'Willem Van Rubroeck' with a cutter capacity of 8,500 kW, and a total installed power of 40,975 kW, and an operational working depth of up to 45 metres

== Projects ==
Major projects realised (in part or whole) by Jan De Nul include:

- Reclamation works at Chek Lap Kok in Hong Kong (1992–1995)
- NorFra Pipeline Installation Project: pretrenching, seabed levelling, landfall dredging and civil works (1995–1997)
- Palm Jebel Ali artificial island in Dubai, and the adjacent Dubai Waterfront.
- Panama Canal expansion project,
- Bridgetown Port enhancement project,
- Port Botany expansion,
- Manifa Field Causeway and Island Project in Saudi Arabia,
- Takoradi Harbour expansion project in Ghana.
- Power interconnector cable over a distance of 135 km and up to 1 km deep sea, with 12,000 tons of cable, connecting the island Crete with the Greek mainland. (2020–2021)
- 25-year concession to maintain the Guayaquil Port Access Channel in Ecuador (2019–2044)
- Princess Elizabeth Island, the world's first artificial energy island (2024–2026)
- Suez Canal expansion project (2014-2015)

== Hijacked vessel ==
In April 2009, the Jan De Nul vessel "Pompei" was hijacked by Somali pirates en route from Aden to Seychelles. The vessel and its crew of ten were released after 71 days on 28 June 2009, after De Nul had paid 2.8 million Euros, according to media reports.
