= European Market Coupling Company =

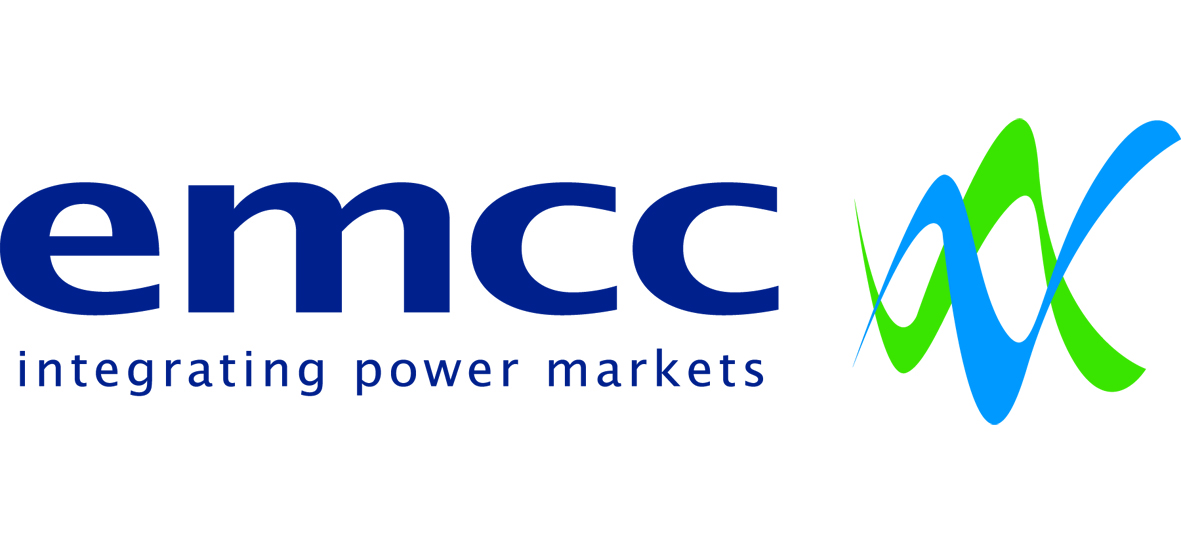
Logotype European Market Coupling Company.

The synchronous grids of Europe.

European Market Coupling Company, EMCC or emcc, is a provider of congestion management services for cross-border electrical interconnectors.

EMCC is a joint venture of the following transmission system operators (TSOs) and electricity exchanges (PXs) in North-Western Europe: Energinet.dk, TenneT TSO GmbH, 50Hertz Transmission GmbH, European Energy Exchange AG, Nord Pool Spot AS. It was established in Hamburg, Germany, in August 2008.

== Purpose and functioning ==
The purpose of EMCC is to promote an efficient electricity market between regions by using market coupling and to promote the integration of a Europe-wide wholesale electricity market.

EMCC calculates optimal electricity flows, based on available transmission capacities (ATC) from the TSOs and anonymous order books (OBK) from the exchanges. Afterwards, EMCC places market coupling bids at the PXs in order to achieve a power flow from the low-price area into the high-price area. Subsequently, EMCC creates schedules and carries out the financial settlement with the PXs. EMCC's calculation algorithm is based on the economic welfare criterion.

== Development ==
Market coupling on two interconnectors between Denmark and Germany first started in 2008 and was stopped after ten days as it became clear that the algorithms used by EMCC and the PXs were not perfectly aligned.

Danish-German market coupling was relaunched successfully in November 2009 with a revised convex optimiser as algorithm. Baltic Cable between Sweden and Germany was integrated in May 2010.

In January 2010, EMCC was asked by TSOs and PXs in the Central Western European (CWE) and Nordic region to develop a system to integrate CWE price coupling and Nordic market splitting. The new scheme is called Interim Tight Volume Coupling (ITVC). It is based on the existing Nordic-German tight volume coupling and is a further enhancement.

On 9 November 2010, day-ahead market coupling for the extended region was launched. This region covers Belgium, France, Luxembourg, Germany, the Netherlands, the Nordic region and Estonia. It represents the world's largest single power market of 1,816 TWh, about 60% of European power consumption. The second step adding the NorNed cable between Norway and the Netherlands started on 12 January 2011.

The TSOs between Finland and Spain are preparing to operate a common electricity market in November 2013, and in May 2014 Spain and Portugal were included. Italy was added in February 2015.

== See also ==
- Baltic Cable
- NorNed
- Cross-Skagerrak
- Kontek
- European Energy Exchange
- Nord Pool
- APX-ENDEX
