= Elia Transmission Belgium =

Belgian high-voltage transmission system operator

Elia Group
- Type: Public
- Traded as: Euronext Brussels: ELI; BEL 20
- Founded: 28 June 2001
- Headquarters: Brussels, Belgium
- Key people: Bernard Gustin (CEO); Bernard Thiry (chairman)
- Products: High-voltage electricity transmission
- Revenue: €4,442 million (2025) €3,767 million (2024)
- Operating income: 1,052,900,000 euro (2025)
- Net income: €683.1 million (2025) €512.5 million (2024)
- Total assets: 32,148,600,000 euro (2025)
- Total equity: €8,945 million (2025) €6,177.4 million (2024)
- Owner: Publi-T 45.08%, Katoen Natie Group 5.20%, Interfin 3.91%, Publipart 2.51%, Belfius Insurance 2.03%, float 41.28%
- Number of employees: 4,572 (2025)
- Subsidiaries: 50Hertz Transmission; Eurogrid International; Elia Grid International; WindGrid re.alto
- Website: elia.be

Elia is a Belgian transmission system operator for high-voltage electricity (30,000–380,000 volts), located in Brussels, Belgium. It operates in Belgium and Germany. The company transmits electricity from generators to distribution system operators, which then supply SMEs and homes. Elia also has contracts with major industrial users that directly connect to its high-voltage grid.

Elia's main activities include managing grid infrastructure (maintaining and developing high-voltage installations), managing the electrical system (monitoring flows, maintaining the balance between electricity consumption and generation 24/7, importing and exporting to and from neighbouring countries) and facilitating the market (developing services and mechanisms with a view to developing the electricity market at national and European level). Elia Group also offers consulting and engineering services through a subsidiary Elia Grid International (EGI), founded in 2014.

== History ==
Elia was created as a result of the unbundling of the electricity market. On 28 June 2001, Elia became an independent public company by merging the Company for the Coordination of the Generation and Transmission of Electrical Energy (CPTE) with the Electrabel entity managing the 30-380 kV grid. On 17 September 2002, it was appointed as the federal transmission system operator in accordance with the Electricity Act of 29 April 1999. On 20 June 2005, Elia was listed on the Euronext Brussels and since 2012 has been part of the BEL20 index. On 8 July 2005, Elia set up the spot market power exchange Belpex, which has since been integrated into Paris-based EPEX SPOT.

On 12 March 2010, Elia and Industry Funds Management reached to an agreement with Vattenfall on the acquisition of the Vattenfall-owned German transmission system operator 50Hertz Transmission GmbH, one of the four German transmission system operators. The transaction was approved by the European Commission on 10 May 2010.

== Operations ==
Elia owns Belgium's 150 to 380 kV grid infrastructure and almost 94% of its 30 to 70 kV grid infrastructure. In addition to the Belgium market, Elia operates also in Germany through its subsidiary 50Hertz Transmission GmbH. The company studies interconnection projects with the United Kingdom (Nemo project), Luxembourg and Germany.

Elia had a 60% stake in the power exchange Belpex. As the activities of Belpex were integrated with the energy exchange APX-ENDEX, Elia received a 20% stake in APX-ENDEX.

Elia is a contributor to the inter-regional electricity trading joint venture the European Market Coupling Company.

== Ownership ==
Elia's shares are listed on Euronext, 44.79% is owned by Publi-T SCRL, a cooperative company representing Belgian municipalities and intermunicipal companies, 9.30% by Katoen Natie, 4.25% by Interfin, 3.32% by Publipart, a holding company of EDF Luminus, and 0.97% by Belfius Insurance, while the rest (37,37%) is free floating (2024).
