= Austrian Power Grid =

Austrian electricity company

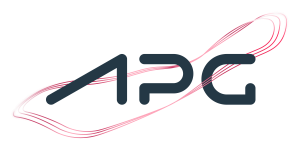
- Type: AG
- Industry: Electricity
- Founded: 1999; 27 years ago
- Headquarters: Wagramer Street 19; Vienna, Austria, EU
- Key people: Austrian Power Grid: Peter F. Kollmann (chairman); Gerhard Christiner (CEO); Marcus Karger (CFO)
- Products: Electric power transmission
- Revenue: ▲EUR 1.28 billion (2025)
- Total assets: ▲EUR 5.95 billion (2025)
- Number of employees: >1000 (2025)
- Parent: Verbund (100%) ↳ Republic of Austria (51%)
- Website: apg.at

Austrian Power Grid AG (APG) is a transmission system operator that owns and operates Austria's highest voltage power transmission lines, about 3400 km at 110 kV, 220 kV, 380 kV and 400 kV, as well as multiple substations and high power switching stations. It has about 600 employees. APG is a wholly-owned subsidiary of Verbund, which itself is majority-owned with 51% by the Republic of Austria.

== Background and network ==
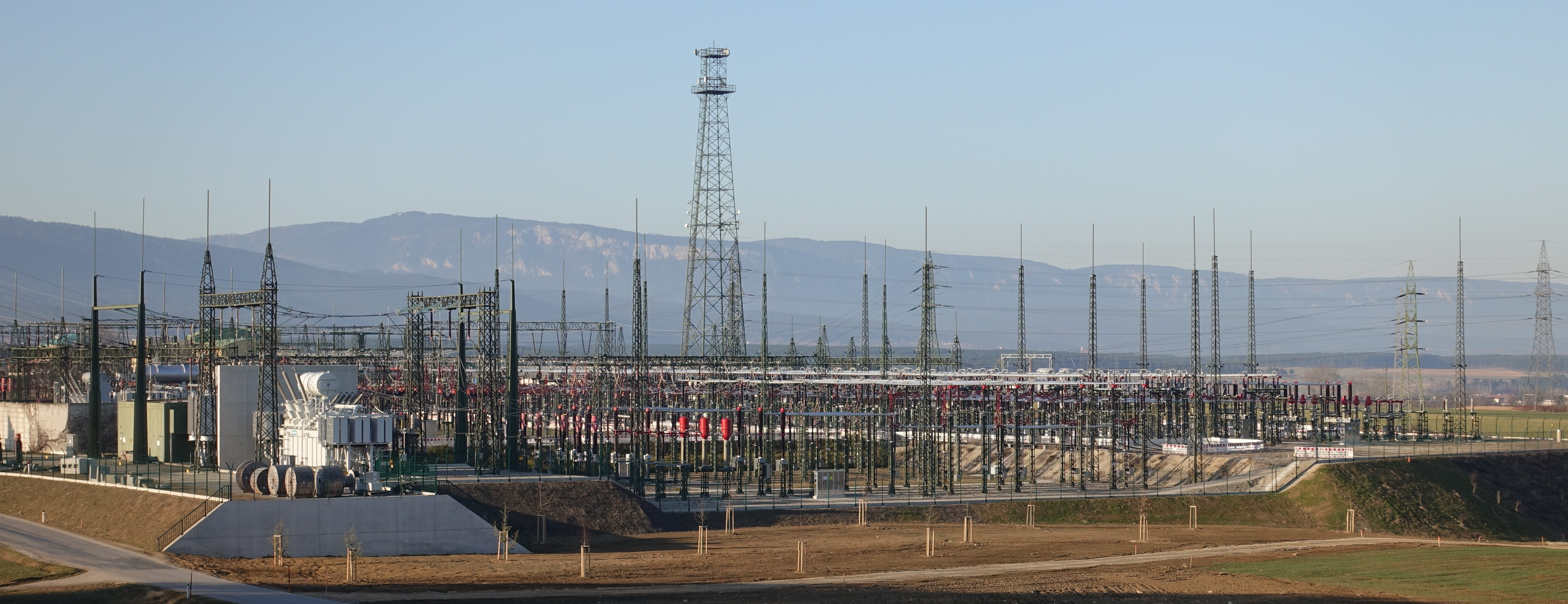
220 kV substation Ternitz

The Austrian Power Grid's network area forms an independent control area within the interconnected Continental Europe Synchronous Area (CESA). The main switchyard is located in Vienna's 10th district, right next to the Vienna-South-East substation. The APG control area covers all Austrian federal states, with the exception of a corridor in Vorarlberg, which belongs to the German control block. The reason for the formation of the APG was the European Union's Third Energy Market Liberalisation Act of 2009, which requires transmission system operators to unbundle from their parent companies. Austrian Power Grid has been unbundled from the Verbund Group.

Austrian Power Grid has a route length of 3,430 km and power lines totalling 6,965 km in length. There are 122 distribution companies for electricity in Austria.
