= Verbund =

Austrian company

Verbund AG
- Type: Aktiengesellschaft
- Traded as: WBAG: VER
- Industry: Utilities
- Founded: 1947
- Headquarters: Vienna, Austria
- Key people: Michael Strugl (CEO), Martin Ohneberg (Chairman of the supervisory board)
- Products: Electricity generation, distribution, trading and wholesale, renewable energy
- Revenue: €10.346 billion (2022)
- Operating income: €2.626 billion (2022)
- Net income: €1.717 billion (2022)
- Total assets: €19.157 billion (2022)
- Total equity: €8.323 billion (2022)
- Number of employees: 3,516 (average, 2022)
- Subsidiaries: APG, GCA
- Website: www.verbund.com

Verbund AG, formerly known as Verbundgesellschaft or Österreichische Elektrizitätswirtschafts-AG, is Austria's largest electricity provider. Verbund covers around 40 percent of electricity demands in Austria and generates 90 percent thereof from hydro power. In addition, Verbund operates the supraregional power grid through its subsidiary APG. Verbund AG is listed on the Vienna Stock Exchange and in the Austrian Traded Index, the key index of Austrian stock-listed companies. The largest shareholder, at 51%, is the Republic of Austria.

== History ==
1947 saw the establishment of Verbund as "Österreichische Elektrizitätswirtschafts-AG" through the second nationalization act. In the post-war years, the company's most urgent task was the planning, construction and operation of large power plants as well as the operation of the supraregional power grid. At the same time, special purpose vehicles (SPVs) were established to promote the construction of large hydropower and thermal power plants. The shares of the Republic of Austria in these special purpose vehicles were held by Verbund as a trustee. In 1955 it was once more possible to meet electricity requirements entirely using own domestic resources. However, as a result of the rapid economic growth, additional electricity had to be imported from 1965 on.

Initially, Verbund - pursuant to prevailing legal principles - was one hundred percent nationalized. In mid-1987, the second nationalization act was amended to the extent that Verbund could be partially privatized, as long as 51 percent remained in government hands. At the same time, Verbund acquired the shares of the Republic of Austria in the special purpose vehicles (Österreichische Donaukraftwerke AG, Österreichische Draukraftwerke AG, Tauernkraftwerke AG, Verbundkraft Elektrizitätswerke GmbH, Ennskraftwerke AG, Donaukraftwerk Jochenstein AG and Österreichisch-Bayerische Kraftwerke AG). In 1988, Verbund was partially deregulated by going public, at which point 49% of the shares were sold.

The most significant break in Verbund's history occurred in 1995 – this was the year that Austria entered the European Union, which, one year later, launched the deregulation of the electricity market. In order to better prepare for this complete opening, Verbund concentrated on the core business of electricity and restructured the Group, a result of which was that the activities were consolidated in a strategic holding company with the business divisions of generation, trade, transmission and equity interests. EU regulations required unbundling of generation and transmission of power as stipulated by company law. At the same time, the company promoted its international activities, beginning with Germany in 1999. Also, by 2003, more than half of the personnel had been let go without notice.

In the 1990s, Austria's energy industry became the setting for a large number of mutual participating interests; thus, for example, the provincial energy providers TIWAG (Tyrol) and EVN (Lower Austria), as well as the Wiener Stadtwerke (including energy provider WienEnergie) increasingly acquired shares in Verbund. Currently these three companies, the majority share of each of which is also in public hands, own more than 25%. Verbund itself participated in EVN in form of a joint venture, however, discontinued this share package in 2003. Important participating interests in Austria today are Kelag (Kärntner Elektrizitäts-Aktiengesellschaft) and STEWEAG-STEG GmbH.

In order to finance the restructuring and expansion of the Verbund Group, eight Austrian Danube power plants, among others, were leased in the period from 1997 to 2000 as part of a cross-border leasing agreement with an American financial company and leased back without property transfer. In 2009, the backtransaction of virtually all leasing transactions was decided and, for the major part, implemented that same year.

In mid-2005, Verbund established the business division of Sales and became active in Austria's end customer market selling electricity. Within but a few years, the company had advanced to the fifth largest end customer provider in Austria. In 2007, Verbund expanded its activities to include additional renewable energy sources and began to undertake large investments in especially wind power. In mid-2009, Verbund acquired a power plant chain on the Bavarian river Inn from energy company E.ON and, hence, advanced to fourth largest hydropower producer in Europe.

== Infrastructure ==
Austrian Power Grid AG, a 100% subsidiary of Verbund AG, disposes of the largest and strongest high-voltage grid in Austria comprising the voltage levels 380 kV with the 380 kV high-voltage ring, as well as the 220 kV and 110 kV levels and several grid facilities. Moreover, Austrian Power Grid AG (APG) is responsible for the technical management of control area APG, which includes all Austrian federal provinces except Vorarlberg; although there are specific plans of transferring the operation of the grid in Vorarlberg to Verbund.

With a transmission route length of 3,471 km and the corresponding transmission lines measuring a total length of 6,763 km, APG's transmission grid forms the backbone for Austrian electricity supply, guaranteeing the energy exchange between suppliers and consumers both at supraregional level throughout Austria and at international level and safeguarding the regular feeding of the distribution grids. Austrian Power Grid AG is de-concentrated from the Group in the sense of EU unbundling regulations.

Currently (2010) the APG high voltage grid measures as follows:

Voltage [kV]	Length of transmission lines [km]	System length [km]
380	1,104	2,218
220	1,661	3,313
110	706	1,232

== Business segments ==
=== Hydropower ===
Close to 90% of Verbund energy in Austria originates from hydropower. Verbund operates 20 storage power plants and 88 run-of-river plants in Austria; these plants are located in the alpine regions of Salzburg, Tyrol, Carinthia and Styria, as well as along all major rivers such as the Inn, Danube, Enns and Drau rivers. Verbund's total installed capacity in hydropower plants is 6,600 megawatt; average annual generation is 24.8 billion kWh altogether. In mid-2009, as a result of Verbund's acquisition of 13 run-of-river plants on the river Inn in Bavaria, Germany, power generation rose by 7%; together, the Bavarian Inn power plants have a peak capacity of 312 megawatt and an annual generation of 1.85 billion kW hours.

=== Thermal power ===
Verbund is also one of the largest producers of electricity in the area of thermal power, as well as one of the largest district heating providers in Austria. Annual generation amounts to approx. 4 billion kWh of electricity and 900 million kWh of heat. Three of altogether nine Verbund thermal power plants - with and without combined heat and power/cogeneration - are currently in operation: Dürnrohr, Mellach und Neudorf-Werndorf II. Together, they have an installed capacity of 815 megawatt. Currently, a new combined cycle gas turbine power plant is being erected at Mellach, scheduled for completion by 2011, with an electrical peak capacity of 832 megawatt and a thermal peak capacity of 250 megawatt. The annual output will be approx. 5 billion kWh of electricity and 800 million kWh of district heating.

=== Wind power ===
Since 2009, Verbund has been operating three wind farms in Austria, in Bruck an der Leitha, Hollern and Petronell-Carnuntum, with a total installed capacity of 49 MW. Further wind farms are planned or in construction in Bulgaria and Romania. In Spain, Verbund operates two photovoltaic plants.

== Carbon intensity ==
Year	Production (TWh)	Emission (Gt CO_{2})	kg CO_{2}/MWh
2002	35	3.65	105
2003	28	5	178
2004	30	4.44	149
2005	29	3.81	131
2006	28	3.7	132
2007	28	3.41	120
2008	29	2.89	101
2009	30	2.21	74

== Group structure ==
=== Business divisions and ratios ===
Verbund has business relations in more than 20 countries, as well as 13 offices and/or equity interests throughout Europe and one in Turkey. In fiscal 2008, Verbund recorded the best result of its history so far: with around 2,500 employees, the company achieved a turnover of more than 3.7 billion Euro, an EBIT of more than 1.1 billion Euro and a group result of just under 686 million Euro.

=== Shareholder structure ===
- 51% Republic of Austria
- > 25% Syndicate of EVN and Wiener Stadtwerke
- > 5% TIWAG (regional energy supplier of the state of Tyrol)
- < 20% free float

=== Trading ===
Within the Verbund Group, electricity trading constitutes the interface between generation, sales and wholesale market. More than half of the power sales are executed abroad, outside Austria. Verbund is active in more than 20 countries, the largest sales markets being Germany, France and Italy. Trade is conducted on all major European stock exchanges. Moreover, utilities and industrial large customers are supplied with energy; green energy and CO_{2} certificates are traded.

=== Sales ===
Effective July 2005, Verbund has been active in the area of direct power sales on the deregulated Austrian market. In addition to household and commercial customers, Verbund has also been supplying the Austrian industry since the beginning of 2006 with energy (market share of 25%). By the end of 2009, Verbund had been supplying some 220,000 end customers with electricity, which makes Verbund the fifth largest end customer provider in Austria.

=== Participating/equity interests ===
Verbund is actively involved in the major electricity markets of Europe and Turkey, mainly in connection with local partners. In Italy, Verbund has a 44.8 percent share in the power company Sorgenia, which was founded as a joint venture with the CIR Group in 1999 under the name of Energia. In France, Verbund holds a 44.8 percent share in energy provider Poweo, founded in 2004. In Turkey, Verbund has had a 50 percent share in energy provider EnerjiSA since 2007, established in 1996 by Sabanci Holding, which holds the remaining 50 percent. Since 2008, all of Verbund's foreign equity interests and projects are bundled in Verbund-International GmbH. Verbund's domestic interests, as in KELAG, for example, are administered by the Group Holding company.

- 46% Poweo, France
- 45% Sorgenia, Italy
- 50% EnerjiSA, Turkey
- 100% Energji Ashta, Albania

=== Subsidiaries ===
Verbund AG has a majority share in Verbund Hydro Power AG (80,34%), as well as in Verbund Thermal Power GmbH & Co KG (55,66%). Various subsidiaries are wholly owned; this includes Austrian Power Grid AG, Verbund Trading AG, Verbund Sales GmbH, Verbund International GmbH, Verbund Management Service GmbH, Verbund Telekom GmbH and Verbund Renewable Power GmbH.

=== Other information ===
Since 2004, Verbund has had its own art collection, "Sammlung Verbund", consisting of contemporary international artworks from 1970 until today. In 2009, Verbund, together with Caritas Austria, launched an electric assistance fund, which is fed with 1 Euro per private customer per year. This fund is intended to support people with below-average incomes by way of interim financial assistance, as well as energy consultations. The Verbund subsidiary VERBUND-Tourismus GmbH is the Group's "advertising agency", promoting its power plants as well as the adjacent areas (Kaprun, Maltatal, Zillertal) as attractive destinations for excursions.

=== Green and sustainability notes ===
On 1 April 2021, Verbund came to market with EUR 500 million in 20-year 'green and sustainability-linked notes' (often colloqusalised: 'green sustainability linkers'), a synthesis of a green and sustainability-linked bond and one of few in the market. The expectation is that this structure allows investors to target funding towards environmentally-friendly projects while incentivising issuers to ensure institution-level sustainability alignment.

== See also ==
- List of renewable energy companies by country
