= TenneT =

Transmission system operator in the Netherlands and Germany

TenneT Holding B.V.
- Type: Government-owned limited liability company (BV)
- Industry: Electricity
- Founded: 1998
- Headquarters: Arnhem, Netherlands
- Number of locations: 485 (Substations, 2024)
- Area served: Netherlands; Germany
- Key people: Manon van Beek CEO
- Services: Electric power transmission
- Revenue: € 9,999 million (2024)
- Total assets: € 21,783 million (2018)
- Owner: Dutch Ministry of Finance
- Number of employees: 8,349 (2024)
- Subsidiaries: TenneT Offshore GmbH; TenneT TSO B.V.; TenneT TSO GmbH
- Website: www.tennet.eu

TenneT is a transmission system operator in the Netherlands and in a large part of Germany.

TenneT B.V. is the national electricity transmission system operator of the Netherlands, headquartered in Arnhem. Controlled and owned by the Dutch government, it is responsible for overseeing the operation of the 380, 220 kV, 150 and 110kV high-voltage grid throughout the Netherlands and its interconnections with neighbouring countries. In Germany, its subsidiary TenneT TSO GmbH is one of the four transmission system operators. Formerly named Transpower, it was taken over and renamed in 2010.

As of 2024, it operates +25.000 kilometres (15.534 mi) of lines and cables at 110 kV (NLD), 220 kV (GER) and above, connecting at 485 high-voltage substations, ~ 28.000 pylons and 43+ million end-users served across the Netherlands and Germany. Tennet also operates 19 offshore connections for a total of 12.2 GW offshore capacity. The sole shareholder is the Dutch Ministry of Finance.

== History ==
External images
- TenneT grid maps
- Archive of TenneT grid map, small
- Grid Maps for Germany and Netherlands on- and offshore (5 MB)
- NL+DE grid map (7 MB) Archive

TenneT was formed in 1998 when the Dutch electricity industry was liberalised, and was incorporated as a business in 2001 with the passing of the Electricity Production Sector Transition Act. Its statutory tasks included management of the national transmission grid and maintaining the balance between electrical supply and demand. In 2003, it acquired the regional system operator Transportnet Zuid-Holland.

TenneT moved beyond these regulated businesses in 2004 when it entered the gas market by acquiring EnergieKeuze, an online gas and power contract exchange market. In 2005 TenneT further expanded its operations when, together with the Belgian and French TSOs Elia and RTE and the APX and Powernext power exchanges, it formed the Belgian Power Exchange Belpex. This granted it a right to participate in the Belgian electricity market.

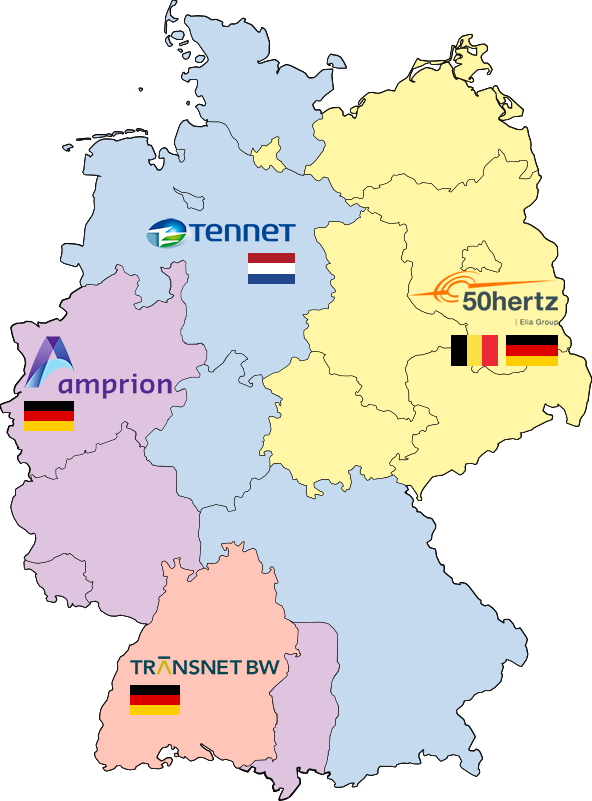
German Transmission System Operators: Tennet, 50Hertz Transmission, Amprion, and TransnetBW

Since 1 January 2010, Tennet owns the German high‑voltage grid operator Transpower Stromübertragungs GmbH, formerly a part of E.ON, now renamed to Tennet TSO GmbH. The agreed value of transaction was €885 million. The company quoted several reasons for the merger, including price equalization, improved grid balancing, greater insight into grid situations, and better possibilities for sustainable development in both countries.

On 1 March 2018, the European Commission opened a formal antitrust investigation against TenneT, alleging it was deliberately bottlenecking the grid connection between Denmark and Northern Germany, preventing cheap wind and hydro power from Scandinavia from being exported to the German market. The Commission adopted a decision on 7 December 2018, imposing binding obligations on TenneT to allow at least 75% of the capacity to be utilized after a 6-month implementation period, as well as to expand the connection capacity from 1300 MW to 2625 MW by January 2026.

In early 2023, TenneT announced that the Dutch and German governments were discussing a potential sale of TenneT's German grid for €22 billion, as the Dutch government was reluctant to provide the growing investment cost for the German grid. The sale was abandoned in 2024, due to the German government lacking the required budget. In the meantime, the Dutch government had provided the company with a €25 billion loan.

In September 2025, a sale was agreed for 46% of the shares of TenneT Germany to a consortium of investors for a value of €9.5bn euros. In February 2026, a further 25.1% was sold to the German government, for the value of €3.3bn.

After the sale, TenneT continues to operate as two separate national organizations in the Netherlands and Germany, held together as a group under a single holding company, which retains a 28.9% share of TenneT Germany.

TenneT is a partner in European Market Coupling Company.

== DC links ==
In 2006, TenneT entered into construction of the 700 MW NorNed undersea HVDC submarine power cable with the Norwegian transmission operator Statnett. Commercial operation of the link was delayed by poor weather and a break in the cable, but it eventually entered operation on the night of 6 May 2008. Connecting the Norwegian and Dutch grids at Feda and Eemshaven, the ±450 kV bipolar cable is, at 580 kilometres (360 mi), the longest undersea power line in the world. During the first two months of test operations, it generated approximately €50 million in revenue, greatly exceeding estimates, and recovering 12% of its cost of construction.

TenneT formed a joint venture with the British transmission operator National Grid to construct the 260-kilometre (160 mi) 1,000 MW BritNed HVDC link between the Isle of Grain, Kent and Maasvlakte, near Rotterdam. Operations began on 1 April 2011, and as of January 2012, electricity flow has mostly been from the Netherlands to the UK. The BritNed interconnection is seen as a vital link for the foreseeable European super grid project.

A 700 MW submarine power cable called COBRA (like NorNed, also from Eemshaven) to Denmark is operated with Energinet.dk from 2019, signing contracts with Siemens and Prysmian in 2016. Further 3½ GW offshore DC links are intended to provide a sea grid structure, and 6½ GW AC links are planned between Netherlands and Germany.

Its subsidiary Transpower Stromübertragungs together with Statnett operates the 1400 MW NORD.LINK cable between Norway and Germany from 2020.

TenneT builds the 2 GW SuedLink, an onshore DC link between Hamburg and south Germany (near Frankfurt), but local opposition means that a timeline is unclear. Both SuedLink and NORD.LINK are on the EU "Projects of Common Interest" list, and SuedLink is supported by EU with €40 million.

TenneT plans onshore AC upgrades in North Germany, connecting new wind power to some of the above DC links.

=== Dogger Island ===
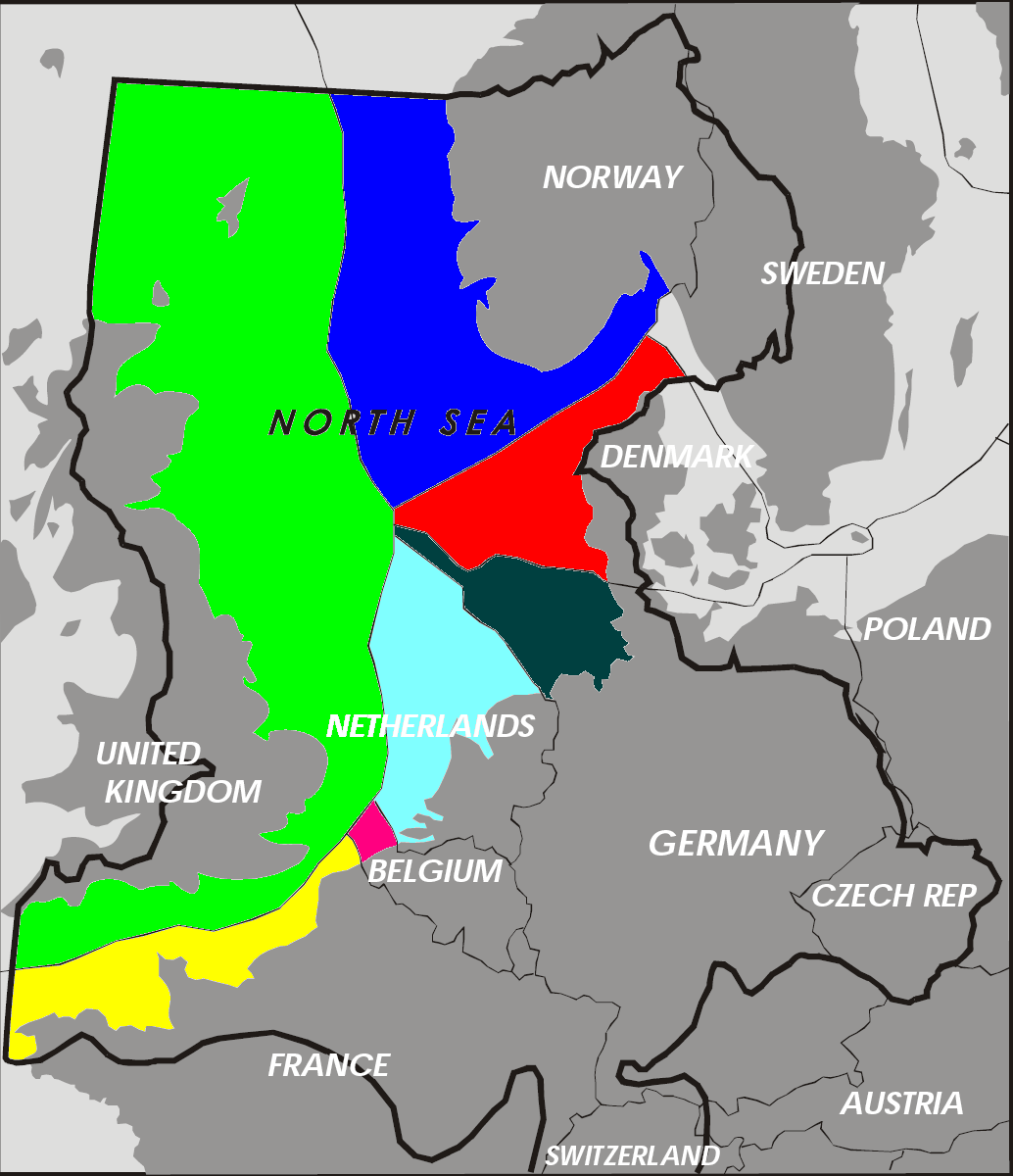
The Exclusive Economic Zones in the North Sea

In 2016, TenneT suggested a 6 km^{2} artificial island in the Dutch corner of the Dogger Bank in the middle of the North Sea, connecting several GW of offshore wind farms with alternating current. Converters on the island would then transmit direct current to the countries around the North Sea in a more economic manner than if each wind farm had its own cable to the country building it. TenneT called for feasibility studies in 2017, and signed an agreement with Energinet. The challenge of coordinating several DC links is studied by the Technical University of Denmark using the Kriegers Flak connector as an example.

=== Suedlink ===
In Germany, most of the wind-power generation is located in the North, while most of the solar power plants are in the South. As of 2023, cases of deficit of wind power in the North require using gas and coal powered power plants, even if the solar power is abundant in the South, and vice versa. To allow for a more robust redistribution of electricity, an almost 700 kilometer high-voltage direct current transmission line called "Suedlink" (sometimes spelled "Südlink") is planned to be built, connecting North of the country to its South. The overhead power line was originally planned to be finished in 2022. However, amid protest from local residents, the plan had to be converted to an underground power delivery system, and scheduled to be finished in 2028. It is expected to provide four gigawatts of electricity to around 10 million households.

The new plan continues to be protested by residents and land owners close to the route of the line. Opponents of the power line cite damage to the environment and habitat, loss of the development opportunities for the local communities as arguments against it. Demonstrators' claim is that instead of big distributors like TenneT, Germany should rely more on a decentralized system of photovoltaics, wind energy and hydrogen.

== See also ==
- 50Hertz Transmission
- Amprion
- Elia System Operator
