= APX Group =

Energy exchange

- Type: Physical spot power exchange (energy), BV (Limited liability)
- Location: Amsterdam, Netherlands
- Founded: 1999
- Owner: EPEX SPOT SE
- Currency: EUR, GBP
- Commodities: Power; Electricity
- Volume: 92 TWh (2014)
- Website: www.apxgroup.com

APX Group (APX) is an energy exchange operating the spot markets for electricity in the Netherlands, the United Kingdom, and Belgium. Established in 1999, APX provides exchange trading, central clearing and settlement, and data distribution services as well as benchmark data and industry indices. APX has over 180 members from more than 15 countries. In 2014, a total volume of 92 TWh of energy was traded or cleared by APX.

APX offices are located in Amsterdam, Brussels and London.

== History ==
In May 1999, trading started at the Amsterdam Power Exchange (APX). It was the first electricity exchange market in Continental Europe. In 2000, the UK's first independent power exchange UKPX (now APX Power UK) was established followed by launch of APX UK electricity spot market in 2001. UKPX was acquired by APX in 2004. ENDEX was acquired by APX Group in 2008 and the integration was completed in 2009. After merging the APX Group and ENDEX a new name APX-ENDEX was introduced. In 2005, APX became a shareholder of Belgian power exchange Belpex SA. 19 April 2010, APX and Belpex announced that they will integrate their activities and Belpex is becoming a part of APX. Belpex is a 100% subsidiary of APX.

On 1 March 2013, APX-ENDEX separated into two companies: the power spot exchange APX and the gas spot, gas derivatives and power derivatives exchange ENDEX. As of 27 March 2014, Intercontinental Exchange (ICE) is the majority shareholder of ENDEX. The name of the new company is ICE Endex.

On 17 April 2015, EPEX SPOT and APX Group, including Belpex, announced their intention to integrate their businesses in order to form a Power Exchange for Central Western Europe (CWE) and the UK.

== Organisation ==
APX Group is a holding company operating three energy exchange markets in the Netherlands, the United Kingdom and Belgium. APX comprises APX Holding B.V., APX Power B.V., APX Commodities Ltd, APX Clearing B.V. APX Shopping B.V. and Belpex N.V., the Belgian power exchange. In addition, the APX provides third-party services for the clearing.

Since 4 May 2015, EPEX SPOT is 100% owner of APX Group.

== Members ==
APX has over 180 memberships from various countries; companies trading on the spot power markets in the Netherlands, Belgium and the UK.
