= Amprion =

One of the four transmission system operators for electricity in Germany

Amprion GmbH
- Formerly: RWE Net Gesellschaft für Beteiligungsverwaltung mbH Nr. 3 RWE Transportnetz Strom GmbH
- Type: GmbH
- Industry: Transmission system operator
- Founded: 24 June 2003; 23 years ago
- Headquarters: Dortmund, Germany
- Area served: Western Germany
- Key people: Dr. Hans-Jürgen Brick, Dr. Klaus Kleinekorte
- Revenue: EUR 7.302 Mio. (2011)
- Number of employees: 2300 (2023)
- Website: www.amprion.net

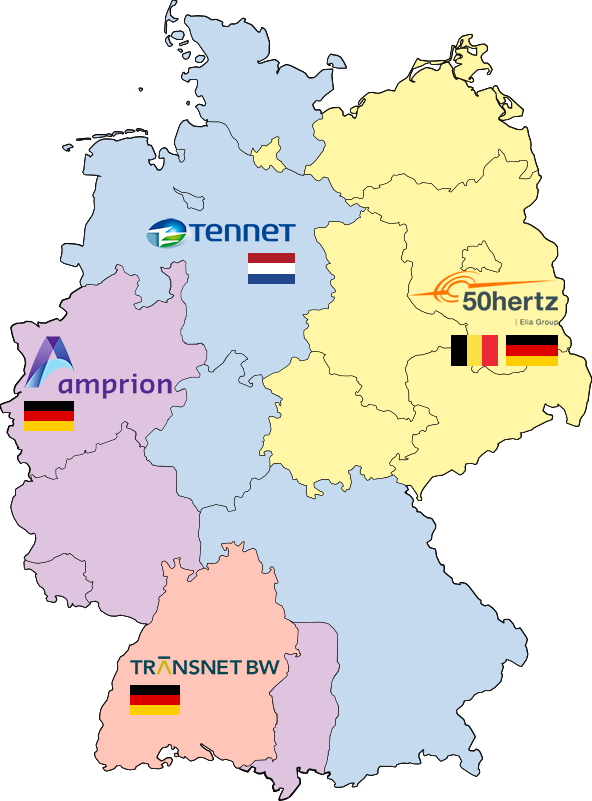

Amprion GmbH (formerly RWE Transportnetz Strom GmbH) is one of the four transmission system operators for electricity in Germany with approx. 2300 employees.

It is a member of European Network of Transmission System Operators for Electricity (ENTSO-E).

== Managed Grid ==
- Grid length (380 kV): 5.300 km
- Grid length (220 kV): 5.700 km

== See also ==
- 50Hertz Transmission GmbH
- TenneT
- TransnetBW
