= 50Hertz Transmission GmbH =

German transmission system operator

- Type: Subsidiary
- Industry: Electricity
- Predecessor: Vattenfall Europe Transmission; Verbundnetz Elektroenergie
- Founded: 2002
- Headquarters: Berlin, Germany
- Key people: Stefan Kapferer (CEO); Dr. Frank Golletz (CTO); Christine Janssen (CFO); Dr. Dirk Biermann (CMO); Sylvia Borcherding (CHRO)
- Services: Electric power transmission
- Revenue: €9.9 billion (2017)
- Net income: €182 million (2017)
- Owner: Elia System Operator (80%); KfW (20%)
- Number of employees: 1,043
- Parent: Eurogrid GmbH
- Website: www.50hertz.com/en/

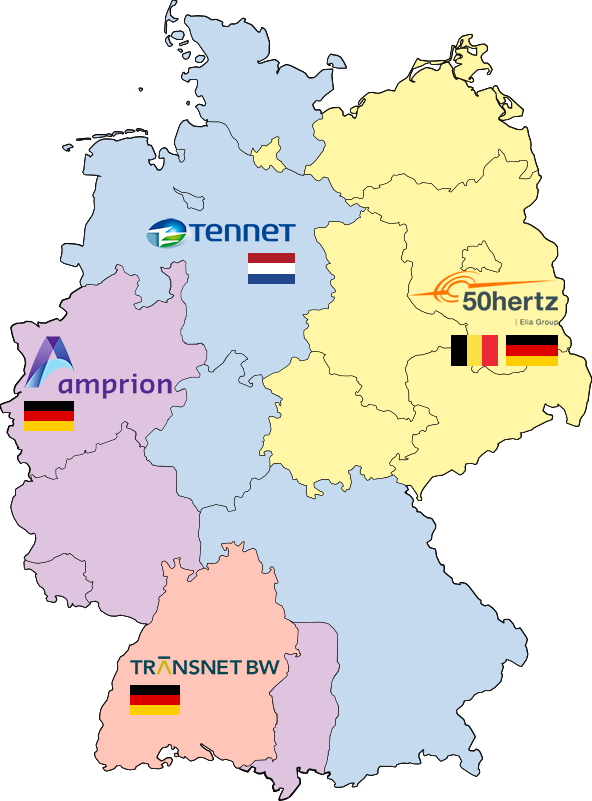
Map of transmission system operators in Germany

50Hertz Transmission GmbH, formerly named Vattenfall Europe Transmission, is one of four transmission system operators for electricity in Germany, and is wholly owned by Eurogrid GmbH, indirectly owned and managed by the Belgian transmission system operator Elia System Operator and Australian-based IFM Investors. The company is a member of the European Network of Transmission System Operators for Electricity (ENTSO-E).

The company has headquarters in Berlin and owns the high power network in eastern Germany as well as the area around Hamburg. It operates the 220 kV and 380 kV networks and has about 10,200 km of power lines covering about 30% of Germany by area. The company employs 1,043 employees.

On 12 March 2010, Elia System Operator and Industry Funds Management acquired 50Hertz Transmission from Vattenfall. The deal was approved by the European Commission on 10 May 2010.

== Investment programme ==
On 23 March 2018, Elia announced its decision to exercise a pre-emption right and to increase its share in Eurogrid, the holding company of 50Hertz, from 60% to 80% for a transaction price of €976.5 million. Later that year, Elia announced the closing of the transactions with IFM and the German state-owned bank Kreditanstalt für Wiederaufbau (KfW) regarding a 20% stake in Eurogrid International. With the close of these transactions, KfW, on behalf of the German Federal Government, replaces IFM as shareholder in Eurogrid.

== See also ==
- Amprion GmbH
- TenneT
- TransnetBW
