= Comarch =

Polish software house and systems integrator

Comarch SA
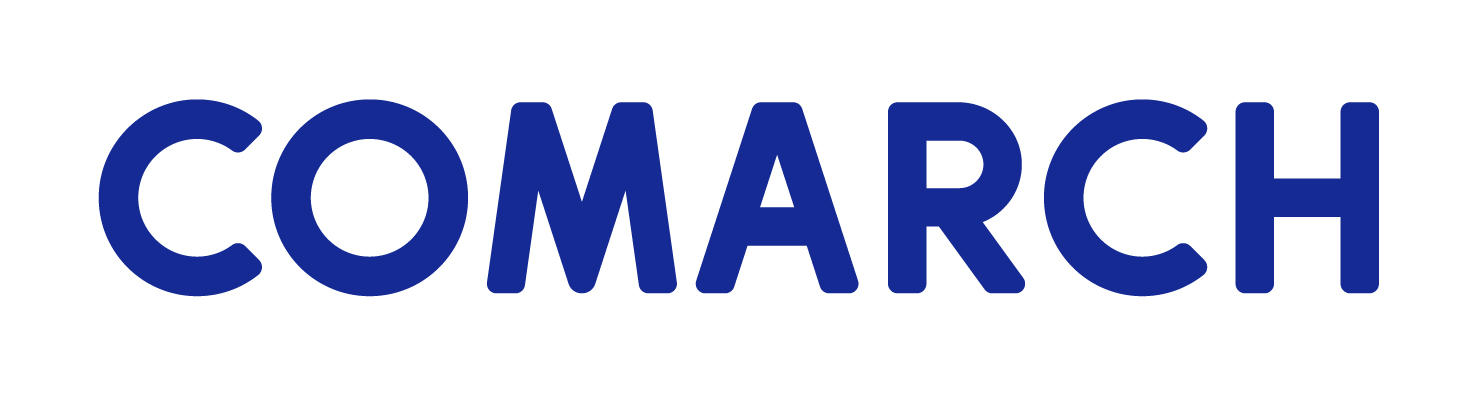
- Industry: Computer software
- Founded: Kraków, Poland (November 30, 1993)
- Founder: Janusz Filipiak (Founder)
- Headquarters: Kraków, Poland
- Area served: Worldwide
- Key people: Jarosław Mikos (CEO); Janusz Filipiak (Founder)
- Revenue: ▲430,0 mln USD (2025)
- Number of employees: 5000 (2026)
- Website: comarch.com

Comarch is a Polish multinational software house and systems integrator based in Kraków, Poland. The company provides services in areas such as telecommunications, finance and banking, services sector. Its services include billing, enterprise resource planning (ERP) systems, Electronic Data Interchange (EDI), global electronic invoicing compliance, IT security, IT architecture, management and outsourcing solutions, customer relationship management (CRM) and sales support, electronic communication, business intelligence, and cloud solutions for various businesses.

Comarch specializes in data exchange and document management, supporting B2B and B2G compliance in over 60 countries, and serves industries including telecommunications, finance, retail, and the service sector.

== History ==
The company was founded in 1993 by Janusz Filipiak, a computer scientist and lecturer at the AGH University of Science and Technology in Kraków. The name of the company is a portmanteau word of "computer architecture". The Group employs more than 5000 employees in 34 countries around the world with a yearly revenue stream of over US$300 million. In 2014, the company opened offices in Chile and Spain. In 2015, a company was established in Malaysia, Sweden and Italy, in 2016 companies from Argentina, Colombia and Peru joined, and in 2017 branches in Saudi Arabia started operating.

The Comarch Corporate Group comprises international branches (such as Comarch AG, Comarch S.A.S., Comarch, Inc. and others). On April 27, 2012, Comarch purchased 100% shares of Esaprojekt. On July 21, 2015, Comarch acquired 42.5% of the shares of the American company Thanks Again LLC specializing in loyalty programs and CRM systems. In 2016, Comarch exported its own products and services worth PLN 661.1 million, which accounts for almost 60% of total revenues. In November 2017, Comarch won tender for maintenance of the KSI system for ZUS. On April 4, 2017, Comarch acquired 100% of shares in the Polish company Geopolis.

Since 2024, Comarch has been part of the portfolio of CVC Capital Partners, a global private equity firm.

On December 8, 2024, during an Extraordinary General Meeting, shareholders voted in favor of a resolution to delist Comarch S.A. shares from the stock exchange. As of March 26, 2025, Comarch S.A. ceased to be a public company, in accordance with the decision of the Polish Financial Supervision Authority (KNF) issued on March 7, 2025.

In April 2026, Comarch published its 2025 annual report, titled "Comarch's Guidebook to the AI Era". The report outlined the company's shift toward AI-native software and operational efficiency under its Value Creation Plan. For the financial year 2025, the Comarch Group reported total revenue of 1.714 billion PLN (approximately 430 million USD), a 6% increase year-on-year. The company also achieved an EBITDA of 381 million PLN and a record volume of bookings reaching 1.935 billion PLN. At the time of the report's release, the company's global workforce stood at approximately 5,000 employees.

== Products and services ==
=== E-Invoicing and EDI ===
Comarch provides electronic data interchange (EDI) and e-invoicing services for B2B and B2G transactions. Comarch E-Invoicing platform connects with national e-invoicing systems, including the National e-Invoice System (KSeF) in Poland, Chorus Pro in France, and the Sistema di Interscambio (SdI) in Italy. Comarch is certified by OpenPeppol as a Peppol Access Point and Service Metadata Publisher (SMP). In France, Comarch is registered by the Directorate General of Public Finances (DGFiP) as an approved platform (plateforme agréée) under the national e-invoicing reform. In the United Arab Emirates, Comarch Middle East FZ LLC is listed by the Ministry of Finance as an Accredited Service Provider (ASP) for the national e-invoicing system. The company also offers services for the cross-border digital reporting requirements introduced by the European Union’s VAT in the Digital Age (ViDA) package.

In 2024, Comarch was named a Leader in the IDC MarketScape: European Compliant E-Invoicing Vendor Assessment. In 2026, it was named a Leader in the IDC MarketScape: Worldwide Compliant E-Invoicing Solutions 2026 Vendor Assessment. Comarch was also included in Forrester Research’s report “The Accounts Payable Invoice Automation Landscape, Q4 2025”.

=== Loyalty Management ===
The company develops loyalty management software used in the telecommunications, retail, finance, and travel industries. The platform includes features for marketing automation and predictive analytics using artificial intelligence. In 2025, Forrester Research categorized Comarch as a "Strong Performer" in the Forrester Wave: Loyalty Platforms report.

=== Comarch Communications ===
A division of the company developed since 1993, dedicated to providing software for the communications sector. Its primary focus is the production of AI-powered entreprise tech systems, which are used to manage telecommunications networks, critical and satellite infrastructure, logistics systems, and public utility communications.

The division's solutions are utilized by telecommunications operators such as Deutsche Telekom, Vodafone, Orange, e&, KPN, du, and LG U+. Comarch Communications' operations and solutions in this field have been recognized in reports by market research firms (including Gartner, IDC, Berg Insight) and honored with industry awards (including TM Forum Catalyst Awards, Asian Telecom Awards).

== Structure ==
=== Poland ===
- Comarch SA (parent company)
- CA Consulting SA
- Comarch Management Sp. z o.o.
- Comarch Corporate Finance closed-end investment fund
- Comarch Management limited liability company SK-A
- CASA Management and Consulting limited liability company SK-A
- Bonus Development limited liability company SK-A
- Bonus Development limited liability company II Koncept SK-A
- Comarch Infrastruktura SA
- iComarch24 SA
- Comarch Technologies Sp. z o.o.
- Comarch Finance Connect Sp. z o. o.
- Comarch Cloud SA
- Comarch Telemedicine sp. z o.o.

=== Europe (outside Poland) ===
- Comarch AG (Germany)
- Comarch Swiss AG (Switzerland)
- Comarch Solutions GmbH (Austria)
- CAMS AG (Switzerland)
- Comarch Luxembourg S.à r.l. (Luxembourg)
- Comarch S.A.S. (France)
- Comarch R&D S.à r.l. (France)
- Comarch UK Ltd. (United Kingdom)
- Comarch LLC (Ukraine)
- Comarch Technologies OY (Finland)
- Comarch S.R.L. (Italy)
- Comarch AB (Sweden)
- Comarch Software LLC (Ukraine)

=== North America ===
- Comarch, Inc. (USA)
- Comarch Pointshub, Inc. (USA)
- Comarch Canada Corp. (Canada)
- Comarch Espace Connecté Inc. (Canada)
- Comarch Panama, Inc. (Panama)
- Comarch Mexico, SA DE C.v (Mexico)

=== South America ===
- Comarch Sistemas LTDA (Brasil)
- Comarch Chile SPA (Chile)
- Comarch Colombia S.A.S. (Colombia)

=== Asia ===
- Comarch Middle East FZ LLC (UAE)
- Comarch Software (Shanghai) Co. Ltd (China)
- Comarch Yazilim A.S. (Turkey)
- Comarch Malaysia SDN. BHD. (Malaysia)
- Comarch Saudi Arabia LLC (Saudi Arabia)
- Comarch Japan KK (Japan)
- Comarch Yuhan Hoesa (South Korea)
- Comarch (Thailand) Limited (Thailand)

=== Australia ===
- Comarch Pty. (Australia)

== Sponsoring ==
The company is or was a sponsor of the following sports clubs:

- Cracovia – a football club sponsored from 2001 to 2026
- TSV 1860 Munich – a German football club (a three-year contract signed in 2009, terminated early, valid until the end of the 2010/2011 season),
- Polonia Warsaw – a football club,
- French sports club Lille OSC since 2019,
- EVZ – a Swiss ice hockey club in Zug (youth divisions),
- Royale Union Saint-Gilloise (in the 2024/25 season).

Comarch is also an official sponsor of ski mountaineer and Himalayan climber Andrzej Bargiel and his high-altitude expeditions organized under the Hic Sunt Leones project, including the Everest Ski Challenge expedition. Bargiel became the first person in history to summit K2 and ski down from its top to the main base camp without using supplemental oxygen. And additionally:

- Last Night of the Proms – a series of classical music promenade concerts,
- Partner of the St. Mary's Organ Festival,
- Nowa Huta Alternative.

== See also ==
- Economy of Poland
