= Value added tax registration thresholds in the European Union =

Value Added Tax (VAT) Registration Thresholds in the European Union

Value Added Tax (VAT) registration thresholds in the European Union (EU) are the minimum sales turnover amounts set by individual Member States of the European Union, above which taxable persons, such as individuals or businesses are required to register for EU VAT. The period for which the VAT registration threshold is calculated typically refers to a calendar year or a 12-month period.

These thresholds are designed to balance between efficient tax collection and reducing administrative burdens on small and micro-enterprises. Moreover, the VAT registration thresholds are a crucial component of VAT policies, as they strike a balance between the goals of revenue collection, economic efficiency, and administrative simplicity.

While the EU VAT system is governed by EU-wide directives, particularly the Council Directive 2006/112/EC, commonly referred to as the EU VAT Directive, Member States retain the discretion to set specific registration thresholds within limits established by EU law.

Under the VAT registration threshold, taxable persons, such as businesses or individuals, who remain below the threshold are generally exempt from charging VAT on their supplies. However, those taxable persons may also be restricted from reclaiming input VAT. In contrast, taxable persons that exceed the defined threshold must register for VAT in the Member State where the threshold is exceeded, collect tax on taxable transactions, and comply with VAT reporting and invoicing requirements.

== History ==
=== Background ===
The concept of VAT registration thresholds dates back to the early stages of harmonizing VAT systems within the European Economic Community (EEC). When the Sixth VAT Directive (77/388/EEC) was adopted in 1977, it permitted Member States to exempt small businesses from VAT obligations, thereby reducing compliance burdens and supporting economic growth. The implementation of registration thresholds was a practical solution to these objectives.

Initially, the thresholds varied widely among Member States and were set at national discretion. Over time, the need for greater coordination and transparency in the internal market led to incremental regulatory alignment, culminating in the replacement of the Sixth Directive by the Council Directive 2006/112/EC on the common system of value added tax. While the Directive laid down a harmonized VAT framework for cross-border supplies, it continued to allow Member States flexibility in setting their domestic thresholds for resident taxable persons.

==== Harmonization and National Discretion ====
Although the European Union has taken steps to harmonize aspects of VAT law, registration thresholds remain an area where national discretion persists, subject to certain limitations. Under Directive 2006/112/EC, Member States may grant VAT exemptions to small enterprises whose annual turnover does not exceed a specified threshold.

===== SME Scheme =====
To further align VAT treatment of small enterprises, the EU adopted Council Directive (EU) 2020/285, which revised the VAT rules for small enterprises by introducing a simplified EU-wide SME Scheme. Effective from 1 January 2025, the scheme establishes a common maximum domestic or national threshold of €85,000 for small business exemptions and enables cross-border access to simplified reporting regimes under certain conditions, primarily if the taxable person's annual Union turnover does not exceed €100,000.

===== OSS and IOSS =====
In 2021, the EU introduced the One-Stop Shop (OSS) and Import One-Stop Shop (IOSS) regimes as part of its e-commerce VAT package. These schemes aim to simplify VAT compliance for businesses engaged in cross-border digital and distance sales by centralizing VAT reporting obligations. However, OSS and IOSS are not threshold-exempt schemes. Instead, they provide optional registration platforms for businesses selling across EU borders, regardless of domestic registration thresholds.

== Country-by-Country VAT Registration Threshold Overview ==
Member State	VAT Registration Threshold for Resident Taxable Persons	VAT Registration Threshold for Non-Resident Taxable Persons
Austria	€55,000	No threshold - Non-resident taxable persons must register for VAT before engaging in taxable activities in Austria
Belgium	€25,000	No threshold - Non-resident taxable persons must register for VAT before engaging in taxable activities in Belgium
Bulgaria	BGN 100,000 (around € 51,000)	No threshold - Non-resident taxable persons must register for VAT before engaging in taxable activities in Bulgaria
Croatia	€60,000	No threshold - Non-resident taxable persons must register for VAT before engaging in taxable activities in Croatia
Cyprus	€15,600	No threshold - Non-resident taxable persons must register for VAT before engaging in taxable activities in Cyprus
Czech Republic	CZK 2 million (around €80,500)	No threshold - Non-resident taxable persons must register for VAT 15 days from the end of the calendar month in which they began taxable activities in the Czech Republic
Denmark	DKK 50,000 (around €6,700)	No threshold - Non-resident taxable persons must register for VAT before engaging in taxable activities in Denmark
Estonia	€40,000	No threshold - Non-resident taxable persons must register for VAT before engaging in taxable activities in Estonia
Finland	€20,000	No threshold - Non-resident taxable persons must register for VAT before engaging in taxable activities in Finland
France	Supply of goods - €85,000 Supply of service - €25,000	No threshold - Non-resident taxable persons must register for VAT before engaging in taxable activities in France
Germany	Turnover did not exceed €22,000 in the previous calendar year and is not expected to exceed €50,000 in the current year	No threshold - Non-resident taxable persons must register for VAT before engaging in taxable activities in Germany
Greece	No threshold - Resident taxable persons must register for VAT before engaging in taxable activities in Greece	No threshold - Non-resident taxable persons must register for VAT before engaging in taxable activities in Greece
Hungary	No threshold - Resident taxable persons must register for VAT before engaging in taxable activities in Hungary. However, small businesses with an annual turnover of less than HUF 18 million per year may apply for exemption.	No threshold - Non-resident taxable persons must register for VAT before engaging in taxable activities in Hungary
Ireland	€42,000 threshold applies to taxable persons who only supply services and those who make supplies of goods that fall within the scope of reduced or standard VAT rates, but are produced from zero-rated materials €85,000 for the supply of goods and the supply of both goods and services where 90% or more of the turnover is from supplies of goods other than those subject to the €42,000 threshold €41,000 for taxable persons making acquisitions from other EU Member States	No threshold - Non-resident taxable persons must register for VAT before engaging in taxable activities in Ireland
Italy	€85,000	No threshold - Non-resident taxable persons must register for VAT before engaging in taxable activities in Italy
Latvia	€50,000	No threshold - Non-resident taxable persons must register for VAT before engaging in taxable activities in Latvia
Lithuania	€45,000	No threshold - Non-resident taxable persons must register for VAT before engaging in taxable activities in Lithuania
Luxembourg	€50,000	No threshold - Non-resident taxable persons must register for VAT before engaging in taxable activities in Luxembourg
Malta	Supply of goods - €35,000 Other supplies - €30,000	No threshold - Non-resident taxable persons must register for VAT before engaging in taxable activities in Malta
Netherlands	€20,000	No threshold - Non-resident taxable persons must register for VAT before engaging in taxable activities in the Netherlands
Poland	PLN 200,000 (around €47,000)	No threshold - Non-resident taxable persons must register for VAT before engaging in taxable activities in Poland
Portugal	€15,000	No threshold - Non-resident taxable persons must register for VAT before engaging in taxable activities in Portugal
Romania	RON 300,000 (around €60,000)	No threshold - Non-resident taxable persons must register for VAT before engaging in taxable activities in Romania
Slovakia	€49,790	No threshold - Non-resident taxable persons must register for VAT before engaging in taxable activities in Slovakia
Slovenia	€60,000	No threshold - Non-resident taxable persons must register for VAT before engaging in taxable activities in Slovenia
Spain	No threshold - Resident taxable persons must register for VAT before engaging in taxable activities in Spain	No threshold - Non-resident taxable persons must register for VAT before engaging in taxable activities in Spain
Sweden	SEK 120,000 (around €10,800)	No threshold - Non-resident taxable persons must register for VAT before engaging in taxable activities in Sweden

Note: Exchange rates are approximate as of 2025 and thresholds are subject to change.

== See also ==
- Import One-Stop Shop (IOSS)
- VAT in the Digital Age
- Value-added tax
- VAT identification number
