= Pagero =

Financial technology company

- Company type: Private
- Industry: Financial technology
- Area served: Worldwide
- Website: https://www.pagero.com/

Pagero is a SaaS (Software as a Service) company owned by Thomson Reuters. Pagero offers a cloud-based business network that enables companies to exchange orders, invoices, payment instructions, and other business documents in an automated and compliant manner. Pagero's platform integrates with ERP systems and other financial software to support order-to-cash and purchase-to-pay processes. Pagero collaborates with a diverse range of partners, including Microsoft, Deloitte, Workday, MasterCard and Medius, to broaden its commercial network reach and solution portfolio.

== History ==
Pagero was founded in 1990 in Sweden by Mats Ryding, Jonas Edlund, and Jan Wendelöv under the name Diamo AB. The company initially focused on enabling secure document exchange between companies and banks. In 2007, the name was changed to Pagero AB, and in 2009, the company shifted focus towards providing a network solution, following the appointment of Bengt Nilsson, founder of IFS, as CEO.

In October 2021, Pagero completed its initial public offering (IPO), listing on the Nasdaq First North Growth Market, raising approximately SEK 730 million (around US$84 million) and reaching a market valuation of SEK 3.7 billion.

In 2022, Pagero was ISO certified according to ISO 27001 and 27701.

Over the years, Pagero has expanded its market reach and service capabilities through several acquisitions:

- 2016: Acquired Primelog, a provider of software for global logistics solutions.
- 2018: Acquired Health Business Solutions GmbH (HBS), expanding its presence in Germany, Austria, and Switzerland.
- 2018: Acquired Palette, a company specializing in financial process automation solutions.
- 2021: Became the majority owner of Gosocket, expanding its presence in Latin America.
- 2022: Acquired Creative Software, strengthening its R&D capabilities.

In 2024, Pagero was acquired by Thomson Reuters, a multinational information conglomerate.

== Industry collaborations ==
Pagero collaborates with international standards bodies, such as Peppol, an interoperability framework led by the organisation OpenPeppol. Pagero is a Peppol Certified Service Provider and member of a number of communities and workgroups within OpenPeppol.

Pagero has participated in three pilots related to VAT in the Digital Age (ViDA), a European Commission initiative aimed at modernizing the EU VAT system to address fraud and challenges associated with the platform economy.

The company is also a member of the Global Exchange Network Association (GENA), with Bengt Nilsson serving as chair of the executive committee.

== Industry recognition ==
Pagero has been mentioned in the Gartner Magic Quadrant for Multienterprise Supply Chain Business Networks in 2022, recognizing its role in providing digital solutions for supply chain integration and management. In September 2024, Pagero was named a Leader in the IDC MarketScape: European Compliant e-Invoicing.
