= European e-commerce VAT directive =

The European e-commerce VAT directive (2002/38/EC from 7 May 2002) is a directive in the European Union which regulates value added tax of sales to consumers in EU and EEA countries.

Several third-party tools and plugins have been developed to help online shops comply with the directive by automating VAT rate updates across EU member states, including solutions for platforms such as WordPress.

A consequence of the directive is the Norwegian VAT On E-Commerce (VOEC) scheme, which was implemented in Norway starting in 2020. To avoid a customs clearance fee, foreign webshops selling goods to consumers in Norway need to register in the VOEC registry of the Norwegian Tax Administration.

== See also ==
- Import One-Stop Shop (IOSS), an EU-wide scheme with similarities to the VOEC
