= Lille OSC in European football =

French club in European football

- Club: Lille OSC
- First entry: 1951 Latin Cup
- Latest entry: 2026–27 UEFA Champions League

French football club Lille OSC played their first European competition in the 1951 Latin Cup. Their first match was against Portuguese side Sporting CP.

== Overall record ==
Page is a work in progress.

=== By competition ===
As of match played 21 October 2026

Latin Cup and 1967 Intertoto Cup excluded because they weren’t organised by UEFA.

Competition	Pld	W	D	L	GF	GA	GD	Win%
UEFA Champions League	71	19	18	34	71	93	−22	26.76
UEFA Cup/Europa League	70	29	19	22	95	75	+20	41.43
UEFA Europa Conference League	12	7	4	1	20	8	+12	58.33
UEFA Intertoto Cup	12	7	4	1	17	7	+10	58.33
Total	165	62	45	58	203	183	+20	37.58

Legend: Pld = Played; W = Won; D = Drawn; L = Lost; GF = Goals For; GA = Goals Against; GD = Goal Difference.

== List of matches ==
Season	Competition	Round	Opponent	Home	Away	Aggregate	Result
1951	Latin Cup	Semi-finals	(Portugal) Sporting CP	1–1 (a.e.t.)	6–4 (a.e.t.)*	—N/a	
1951	Latin Cup	Final	(Italy) Milan	0–5			
1967	Intertoto Cup	Group stage	(Switzerland) Sion	3–1	0–0	3rd	
1967	Intertoto Cup	Group stage	(Belgium) Beerschot	2–2	0–1	3rd	
1967	Intertoto Cup	Group stage	(Netherlands) Groningen	3–1	2–1	3rd	
2001–02	UEFA Champions League	Third qualifying round	(Italy) Parma	2–0	0–1	2–1	
2001–02	UEFA Champions League	Group G	(England) Manchester United	1–1	0–1	3rd	
2001–02	UEFA Champions League	Group G	(Greece) Olympiacos	3–1	1–2	3rd	
2001–02	UEFA Champions League	Group G	(Spain) Deportivo La Coruña	1–1	1–1	3rd	
2001–02	UEFA Cup	Third round	(Italy) Fiorentina	1–0	2–0	3–0	
2001–02	UEFA Cup	Fourth round	(Germany) Borussia Dortmund	1–1	0–0	1–1 (a)	
2004–05	UEFA Intertoto Cup	Third round	(Belarus) Dinamo Minsk	2–1	2–2	4–3	
2004–05	UEFA Intertoto Cup	Semi-finals	(Croatia) Slaven Belupo	3–0	1–1	4–1	
2004–05	UEFA Intertoto Cup	Finals	(Portugal) União de Leiria	0–0	2–0 (a.e.t.)	2–0	
2004–05	UEFA Cup	First round	(Republic of Ireland) Shelbourne	2–2	2–0	4–2	
2004–05	UEFA Cup	Group H	(Germany) Alemannia Aachen	—N/a	0–1	1st	
2004–05	UEFA Cup	Group H	(Russia) Zenit Saint Petersburg	2–1	—N/a	1st	
2004–05	UEFA Cup	Group H	(Greece) AEK Athens	—N/a	2–1	1st	
2004–05	UEFA Cup	Group H	(Spain) Sevilla	1–0	—N/a	1st	
2004–05	UEFA Cup	Round of 32	(Switzerland) Basel	2–0	0–0	2–0	
2004–05	UEFA Cup	Round of 16	(France) Auxerre	0–1	0–0	0–1	
2005–06	UEFA Champions League	Group D	(Portugal) Benfica	0–0	0–1	3rd	
2005–06	UEFA Champions League	Group D	(Spain) Villarreal	0–0	0–1	3rd	
2005–06	UEFA Champions League	Group D	(England) Manchester United	1–0	0–0	3rd	
2005–06	UEFA Cup	Round of 32	(Ukraine) Shakhtar Donetsk	3–2	0–0	3–2	
2005–06	UEFA Cup	Round of 16	(Spain) Sevilla	1–0	0–2	1–2	
2006–07	UEFA Champions League	Third qualifying round	(North Macedonia) Rabotnički	3–0	1–0	4–0	
2006–07	UEFA Champions League	Group H	(Belgium) Anderlecht	2–2	1–1	2nd	
2006–07	UEFA Champions League	Group H	(Greece) AEK Athens	3–1	0–1	2nd	
2006–07	UEFA Champions League	Group H	(Italy) Milan	0–0	0–2	2nd	
2006–07	UEFA Champions League	Round of 16	(England) Manchester United	0–1	0–1	0–2	
2009–10	UEFA Europa League	Third qualifying round	(Serbia) Sevojno	2–0	2–0	4–0	
2009–10	UEFA Europa League	Play-off round	(Belgium) Genk	2–1	4–2	6–3	
2009–10	UEFA Europa League	Group B	(Spain) Valencia	1–1	1–3	2nd	
2009–10	UEFA Europa League	Group B	(Czech Republic) Slavia Prague	3–1	5–1	2nd	
2009–10	UEFA Europa League	Group B	(Italy) Genoa	3–0	2–3	2nd	
2009–10	UEFA Europa League	Round of 32	(Turkey) Fenerbahçe	2–1	1–1	3–2	
2009–10	UEFA Europa League	Round of 16	(England) Liverpool	1–0	0–3	1–3	
2010–11	UEFA Europa League	Play-off round	(Romania) Vaslui	0–0	2–0	2–0	
2010–11	UEFA Europa League	Group C	(Portugal) Sporting CP	1–2	0–1	2nd	
2010–11	UEFA Europa League	Group C	(Belgium) Gent	3–0	1–1	2nd	
2010–11	UEFA Europa League	Group C	(Bulgaria) Levski Sofia	1–0	2–2	2nd	
2010–11	UEFA Europa League	Round of 32	(Netherlands) PSV Eindhoven	2–2	1–3	3–5	
2011–12	UEFA Champions League	Group B	(Russia) CSKA Moscow	2–2	2–0	4th	
2011–12	UEFA Champions League	Group B	(Turkey) Trabzonspor	0–0	1–1	4th	
2011–12	UEFA Champions League	Group B	(Italy) Internazionale	0–1	1–2	4th	
2012–13	UEFA Champions League	Play-off round	(Denmark) Copenhagen	2–0	0–1	2–1	
2012–13	UEFA Champions League	Group F	(Belarus) BATE Borisov	1–3	2–0	4th	
2012–13	UEFA Champions League	Group F	(Spain) Valencia	0–1	0–2	4th	
2012–13	UEFA Champions League	Group F	(Germany) Bayern Munich	0–1	1–6	4th	
2014–15	UEFA Champions League	Third qualifying round	(Switzerland) Grasshoppers	1–1	2–0	3–1	
2014–15	UEFA Champions League	Play-off round	(Portugal) Porto	0–1	0–2	0–3	
2014–15	UEFA Europa League	Group H	(Russia) Krasnodar	1–1	1–1	4th	
2014–15	UEFA Europa League	Group H	(Germany) VfL Wolfsburg	1–1	1–5	4th	
2014–15	UEFA Europa League	Group H	(England) Everton	0–0	0–3	4th	
2016–17	UEFA Europa League	Third qualifying round	(Azerbaijan) Gabala	1–1	0–1	1–2	
2019–20	UEFA Champions League	Group H	(Netherlands) Ajax	0–2	0–3	4th	
2019–20	UEFA Champions League	Group H	(England) Chelsea	0–2	1–2	4th	
2019–20	UEFA Champions League	Group H	(Spain) Valencia	1–1	1–4	4th	
2020–21	UEFA Europa League	Group H	(Czech Republic) Sparta Prague	2–1	4–1	2nd	
2020–21	UEFA Europa League	Group H	(Scotland) Celtic	2–2	2–3	2nd	
2020–21	UEFA Europa League	Group H	(Italy) Milan	1–1	3–0	2nd	
2020–21	UEFA Europa League	Round of 32	(Netherlands) Ajax	1–2	1–2	2–4	
2021–22	UEFA Champions League	Group G	(Germany) VfL Wolfsburg	0–0	3–1	1st	
2021–22	UEFA Champions League	Group G	(Austria) Red Bull Salzburg	1–0	1–2	1st	
2021–22	UEFA Champions League	Group G	(Spain) Sevilla	0–0	2–1	1st	
2021–22	UEFA Champions League	Round of 16	(England) Chelsea	1–2	0–2	1–4	
2023–24	UEFA Europa Conference League	Play-off round	(Croatia) Rijeka	2–1	1–1 (a.e.t.)	3–2	
2023–24	UEFA Europa Conference League	Group A	(Slovenia) Olimpija Ljubljana	2–0	2–0	1st	
2023–24	UEFA Europa Conference League	Group A	(Faroe Islands) KÍ	3–0	0–0	1st	
2023–24	UEFA Europa Conference League	Group A	(Slovakia) Slovan Bratislava	2–1	1–1	1st	
2023–24	UEFA Europa Conference League	Round of 16	(Austria) Sturm Graz	1–1	3–0	4–1	
2023–24	UEFA Europa Conference League	Quarter-finals	(England) Aston Villa	2–1 (a.e.t.)	1–2	3–3 (3–4 p)	
2024–25	UEFA Champions League	Third qualifying round	(Turkey) Fenerbahçe	2–1	1–1 (a.e.t.)	3–2	
2024–25	UEFA Champions League	Play-off round	(Czech Republic) Slavia Prague	2–0	1–2	3–2	
2024–25	UEFA Champions League	League phase	(Portugal) Sporting CP	—N/a	0–2	7th	
2024–25	UEFA Champions League	League phase	(Spain) Real Madrid	1–0	—N/a	7th	
2024–25	UEFA Champions League	League phase	(Spain) Atlético Madrid	—N/a	3–1	7th	
2024–25	UEFA Champions League	League phase	(Italy) Juventus	1–1	—N/a	7th	
2024–25	UEFA Champions League	League phase	(Italy) Bologna	—N/a	2–1	7th	
2024–25	UEFA Champions League	League phase	(Austria) Sturm Graz	3–2	—N/a	7th	
2024–25	UEFA Champions League	League phase	(England) Liverpool	—N/a	1–2	7th	
2024–25	UEFA Champions League	League phase	(Netherlands) Feyenoord	6–1	—N/a	7th	
2024–25	UEFA Champions League	Round of 16	(Germany) Borussia Dortmund	1–2	1–1	2–3	
2025–26	UEFA Europa League	League phase	(Norway) Brann	2–1	—N/a	18th	
2025–26	UEFA Europa League	League phase	(Italy) Roma	—N/a	1–0	18th	
2025–26	UEFA Europa League	League phase	(Greece) PAOK	3–4	—N/a	18th	
2025–26	UEFA Europa League	League phase	(Serbia) Red Star Belgrade	—N/a	0–1	18th	
2025–26	UEFA Europa League	League phase	(Croatia) Dinamo Zagreb	4–0	—N/a	18th	
2025–26	UEFA Europa League	League phase	(Switzerland) Young Boys	—N/a	0–1	18th	
2025–26	UEFA Europa League	League phase	(Spain) Celta Vigo	—N/a	1–2	18th	
2025–26	UEFA Europa League	League phase	(Germany) SC Freiburg	1–0	—N/a	18th	
2025–26	UEFA Europa League	Knockout phase play-offs	(Serbia) Red Star Belgrade	0–1	2–0 (a.e.t.)	2–1	
2025–26	UEFA Europa League	Round of 16	(England) Aston Villa	0–1	0–2	0–3	
2026–27	UEFA Champions League	League phase	(Spain) Real Betis	2–3	—N/a		
2026–27	UEFA Champions League	League phase	(England) Arsenal	—N/a	0–3		
2026–27	UEFA Champions League	League phase	(Turkey) Galatasaray	2–4	—N/a		
2026–27	UEFA Champions League	League phase	(Norway) Bodø/Glimt	—N/a			
2026–27	UEFA Champions League	League phase	(Germany) Bayern Munich		—N/a		
2026–27	UEFA Champions League	League phase	(Germany) VfB Stuttgart	—N/a			
2026–27	UEFA Champions League	League phase	(Slovakia) Slovan Bratislava		—N/a		
2026–27	UEFA Champions League	League phase	(Italy) Roma	—N/a			

* Replay instead of home and away tie.
