= VAT in the Digital Age =

European Union VAT Reform

The VAT in the Digital Age (ViDA) package, also known as the ViDA package or ViDA reform, is a three-pillar reform originating from the European Commission's Tax Package; adopted on 15 July 2020, to establish a fair, efficient, and sustainable taxation system that ensures tax revenues for Member States of the EU. The ViDA package was formally adopted on 11 March 2025.

The ViDA package was proposed on 8 December 2022 by the European Commission as a measure to modernize the European Union's (EU) value-added tax (VAT) system. It was adopted following the Economic and Financial Affairs Council's (ECOFIN) agreement on the package on 5 November 2024, and subsequent consultation with the European Parliament, which approved the ViDA package in February 2025.

The purpose of the proposed and adopted reform was to reduce the VAT Gap in the EU, which, according to the European Commission VAT Gap Report 2023, contributed to a loss of €99 billion in VAT revenues among Member States in 2020.

The proposed package aimed to introduce a new real-time digital reporting system based on electronic invoicing (e-invoicing), update VAT rules for the platform economy, and establish a single VAT registration for businesses selling to consumers across the EU.

The adopted three-pillar ViDA package consists of:

1. Council Directive (EU) 2025/516 of 11 March 2025 amending Directive 2006/112/EC as regards VAT rules for the digital age
2. Council Regulation (EU) 2025/517 of 11 March 2025 amending Regulation (EU) No 904/2010 as regards the VAT administrative cooperation arrangements needed for the digital age; and
3. Council Implementing Regulation (EU) 2025/518 of 11 March 2025 amending Implementing Regulation (EU) No 282/2011 as regards information requirements for certain VAT schemes.

The ViDA package was officially published in the Official Journal of the European Union under the L-series on 25 March 2025, and came into force on 12 April 2025. The Member States have different deadlines for each pillar to pass and implement appropriate legislation to meet the ViDA's requirements.

Before being officially adopted, it took nearly two years for the ECOFIN members to agree on the final text of the proposed introduction of the deemed supplier rule on the platform facilitating short-term accommodation rental and passenger transportation. The central point of disagreement on the final text was Estonia's opposition to the imposition of VAT collection responsibilities on platforms facilitating short-term accommodation rentals and passenger transport.

== History ==
=== Background ===
In 2020, the European Commission released a Tax Package, consisting of three separate but complementary initiatives. The initiatives include an Action Plan with "25 measures to reduce tax obstacles, promote taxpayers' rights and help Member States secure reliable tax revenues," reform of the Code of Conduct, and the establishment of a solution for better administrative cooperation at the EU level.

Part of the Tax Action Plan to establish a fair and simplified taxation system included the European Commission's proposal to amend the EU VAT Directive (Council Directive 2006/112/EC of 28 November 2006 on the common system of value-added tax). Additionally, the modernization of VAT rules to fit the online platform economy was one of the 25 measures.

In December 2022, the European Commission announced proposed measures to align the EU VAT system with the digital economy. The primary purpose of the proposed measures was to digitize the EU VAT system and make it more business-friendly and more resilient to fraud. The proposed measures under the ViDA package aimed to collect up to €18 billion more in VAT revenues annually, with €11 billion to be collected as a direct result of anti-fraud measures. Moreover, the modernization of the EU VAT system would contribute to a €5 billion annual reduction in compliance costs overall in the ten-year period.

While some developments had been made prior to the announcement of the proposed ViDA package, primarily the introduction of the 2021 VAT e-commerce rules, the EU VAT system for intra-EU trade was 30 years old and could not meet the demands and address the issues of the digital age and economy. Additionally, businesses operating in the European Single Market, especially small and medium enterprises (SMEs), had to comply with up to 27 different national VAT systems, each imposing separate reporting requirements.

With the proposed measures, the European Commission aimed to leverage the full potential of technology to establish a VAT system that is resilient to VAT fraud and supports EU businesses, particularly SMEs, in their growth.

The European Commission proposed:

- To move to real-time digital reporting based on e-invoicing for businesses that operate cross-border in the EU, and a harmonized framework for domestic transactions;
- Updated VAT rules for passenger transport and short-term accommodation platforms;
- The introduction of a single VAT registration across the EU.

=== Legislative process ===
The ViDA package fell under the special legislative procedure, where the Council of the European Union (the Council) can independently adopt legislation proposed by the European Commission. In contrast to the ordinary legislative procedure, where the European Parliament and the Council have equal legislative powers, in special legislative procedure, the European Parliament " can only approve the Commission proposal or be consulted on it."

Following the special legislative procedure, the proposal required unanimity in the Council for its adoption, following consultation of the European Parliament and the European Economic and Social Committee. The ViDA package was assigned to the Economic and Monetary Affairs Committee, which on 22 November 2023, adopted a non-binding report approving the European Commission's proposal. At the same time, the European Parliament proposed amendments to the European Commission proposal, primarily extending the implementation deadlines for Member States.

After the European Parliament was consulted, the text of the legislation was sent to the Council for further discussions. As part of the procedure, all 27 representatives of the Member States had to agree on the final text of the ViDA package.

Following the strong opposition by Estonia to the mandatory introduction of the deemed supplier rule for transport and accommodation platforms, the political agreement on the final text of the VIDA package was reached in November 2024 at the Economic and Financial Affairs Council (ECOFIN) meeting, which consists of the representatives from each EU Member State at a ministerial level.

Since the final text of the ViDA package differed from the original text presented to and approved by the European Parliament, the Parliament had to be reconsulted. Following the Parliament's approval of the final text on 12 February 2025, with 589 votes in favor, 49 against, and 10 abstentions, the Council formally adopted the VIDA package on 11 March 2025.

== Content ==
The VAT in Digital Age (ViDA) package amends three EU VAT legislations, each of which represents one of the three pillars. Although the ViDA package came into effect on 14 April 2025, the adopted amendments will be implemented progressively over a period of 10 years, until 2035.

=== First pillar: E-invoicing and digital reporting ===
Adopted amendments to the EU VAT Directive provide for the introduction of a new uniform real-time digital reporting system for VAT purposes. The system is based on e-invoicing for cross-border transactions. Since April 2025, Member States have been permitted to impose mandatory e-invoicing rules for domestic transactions without requiring a derogation from the Council.

From 1 July 2030, EU VAT-registered businesses will be required to issue structured e-invoices for cross-border business-to-business (B2B) and business-to-government (B2G) transactions within the EU. The new system will replace the existing system under which businesses are required to submit a "recapitulative statement" to the national tax authority. The e-invoice data will be automatically reported to the national tax authorities in accordance with a European standard.

Tax authorities of Member States will share gathered data through a new IT system. The establishment of a fully harmonized e-invoicing system at the EU level is scheduled for 1 January 2035.

=== Second pillar: Platform economy ===
The second pillar of the ViDA package established new rules for passenger transport and short-term accommodation rental platform operators. Starting from 1 July 2028, digital platforms acting as intermediaries or agents in facilitating the supply of short-term accommodation rentals and passenger road transport will be regarded as the deemed supplier of those services for VAT purposes. They will therefore be liable to account for VAT.

However, Member States have the right to postpone the implementation of this rule in their national legislation until 1 January 2030. Additionally, Member States have the right not to subject a platform to a deemed supplier rule if the underlying supplier qualifies and opts for the small and medium-sized business (SME) VAT regime.

=== Third pillar: Single VAT Registration ===
The third pillar, commonly known as the Single VAT registration pillar, expands the existing One Stop Shop (OSS) system for business-to-consumer (B2C) distance sales of goods and certain services, to include other B2C supplies, such as supplies of electricity and natural gas, supply and install contracts, and certain domestic supplies of goods and services.

The extension of the OSS will commence on 1 January 2027, when B2C supplies of electricity, natural gas, and other energy-related goods will be included in the system. The completion of the extension is scheduled for 1 July 2028.

Additionally, from 1 July 2028, businesses moving their own goods between Member States will have the option to report this movement through the OSS system. This aims to change the current rule, under which these movements often require VAT registration and reporting in both the dispatch and arrival Member States. Consequently, the VAT call-off stock regime, introduced in 2020, will be abolished.

== Controversy ==
The Second Pillar, commonly referred to as the Platform Economy, met with strong opposition from Estonia and was part of extensive negotiations before a political agreement was reached on the final version of the text. As the Second Pillar aims to introduce new responsibilities for VAT collection on platforms facilitating short-term accommodation rentals and passenger transport, Estonia opposed the mandatory introduction of the deemed supplier rule for transport and accommodation platforms.

Estonia argued that the implementation of such a rule should be optional for EU Member States. Estonia's reluctance to agree to the proposed suggestion concerning the Second Pillar led to a delay in adopting the final text of the ViDA package.

After two ECOFIN meetings on 14 May 2024 and 21 June 2024, the political agreement was finally reached on 5 November 2025. As a result of the negotiation, the initial implementation of a mandatory deemed supplier for specific supplies of short-term accommodation rentals of up to 30 days maximum, and passenger transport by road, planned for 1 July 2027, was changed. The new implementation timeline was agreed on and was later confirmed by the publication of the ViDA legislative package in the Official Journal of the European Union.

The final agreed-upon implementation timeline is that EU Member States must adopt and transpose new deemed supplier rules for digital platforms by 30 June 2028. Starting from July 1, 2028, the new deemed supplier rules will take effect. However, EU Member States may delay the implementation of new deemed supplier rules until 1 January 2030.

=== Lobbying ===
On 22 June 2025, the Estonian Minister of Finance, Mart Võrklaev, stated that "There were no substantive changes, which is what Estonia stands for", when asked to comment on Estonians' disapproval of the proposed text on the Second Pillar of the ViDA package at the ECOFIN meeting on June 21 2025. Notably, the Estonian Minister of Finance at that time said that the decision not to accept the proposed text had "nothing to do with Bolt".

One day before the ECOFIN meeting in June 2024, Politico reported Estonia's "stance is influenced by years of lobbying by its national champion, Bolt." The Politico further added that "Bolt's lobbyists were ever-present before and during the entire handling of the file (more than 2.5 years) thanks to a classic coalition strategy with other key players.", and that "Martin and Markus Villig, the two brothers who own Bolt, have donated more than €220,000 between them to Estonian political parties in recent years, according to the public database of Estonia's Political Party Funding Supervision Committee (ERJK)."

The Transparency Register, a European Union lobby register, reported that ViDA is one of the main EU legislative proposals or policies targeted by Bolt, and that the company paid between €600,000 - €699,999 in the 2023 financial year to lobbyist companies.

== Implementation into national law ==
Since the ViDA package includes three amended legislations, it cannot be immediately implemented or applied to any legislation of Member States. Additionally, the implementation of each of the three pillars may differ from one Member State to another. However, the progressive implementation timeline of the ViDA package is:

Date	Pillar	Rule Implemented
1 January 2027	Third Pillar	One Stop Shop (OSS) and Import One Stop Shop (OSS) extension
1 July 2028	Second Pillar	New deemed supplier rules for short-term accommodation rentals and passenger road transport digital platforms
1 July 2028	Third Pillar	Extension of the OSS schemes
1 July 2028	Third Pillar	Mandatory reverse charge for non-identified suppliers
1 July 2029	First Pillar	Replacement of the recapitulative statements
1 January 2030	Second Pillar	Final deadline for implementation of the delayed deemed supplier rule
1 July 2030	First Pillar	Digital Reporting Requirements for B2B cross-border supplies
1 January 2035	First Pillar	Harmonized real-time digital reporting on the EU level

== See also ==
- Import One Stop Shop (OSS)
