= Import One-Stop Shop =

Electronic portal in the European Union

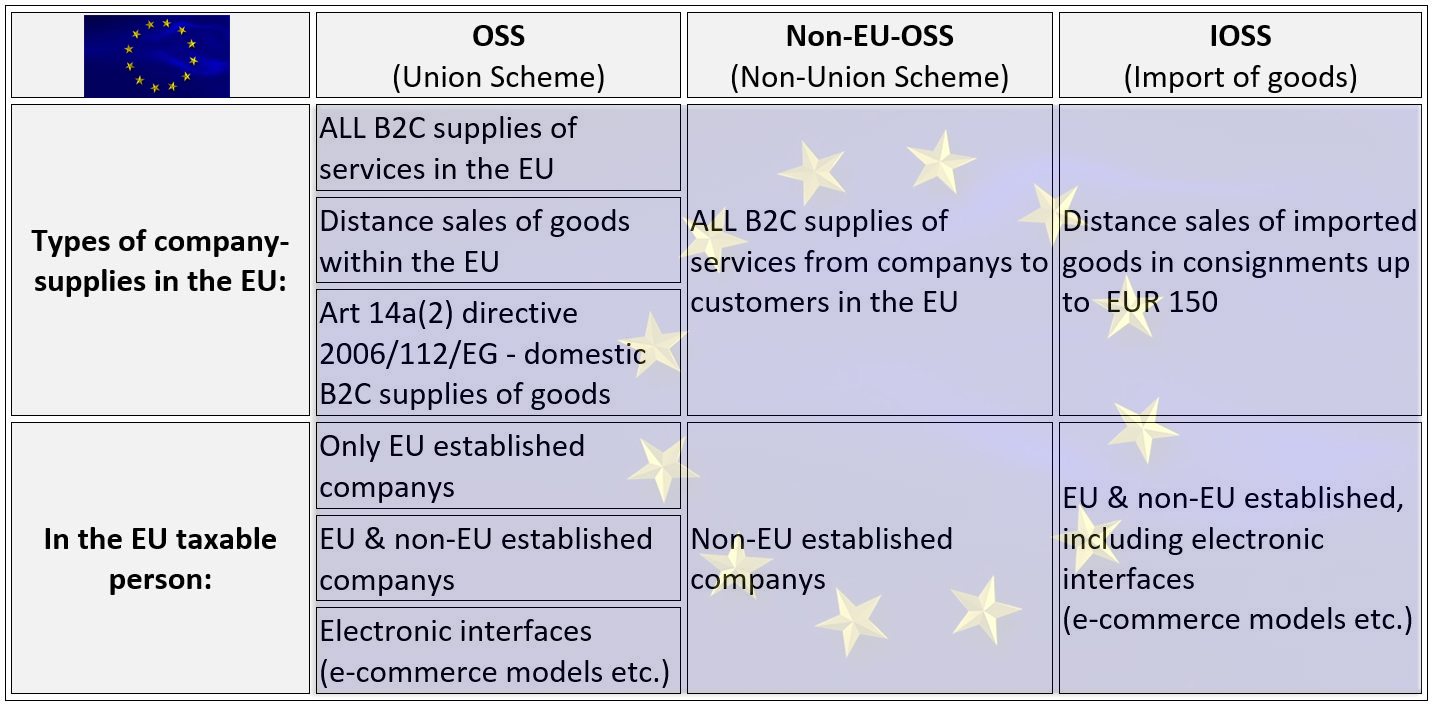
Table showing all three EU OSS schemas: (EU-)OSS, non-EU OSS and IOSS

Import One-Stop Shop (IOSS or Import OSS) is an electronic one-stop shop (OSS) portal in the European Union (EU) which serves as a point of contact for the import of goods from third countries into the European Union. The scheme aims to simplify the declaration and payment of value-added tax when importing goods into the European Union.

IOSS became available from 1 July 2021, and applies to distance sales of items imported from third territories or third countries with a value from 0 to 150 euros. Participation in the IOSS portal is voluntary.

== History ==
A system change in the VAT procedure was proposed by the European Commission in two stages. The first stage came into effect on 1 January 2015 under the name Mini One-Stop Shop (MOSS), and related to telecommunications, radio and television services as well as electronically provided services to end customers.

The second package of measures was adopted by the Council of the European Union in 2017 December, and extended the VAT system change to distance sales and any types of cross-border service provided to a final customer in the EU.

== Goals ==
Changes in trade patterns of the world economy and the creation of new technologies have opened up new trading opportunities, and it is expected that e-commerce through distance sales will continue to grow, in particular via electronic marketplaces or platforms (electronic interfaces). To keep up with these e-commerce changes, EU VAT regulations have also changed.

Some aims of the EU VAT packages for e-commerce are:

- VAT is paid when the consumption of goods and services takes place
- Create a uniform VAT regulation for cross-border deliveries and services, thus simplifying cross-border trade
- Fight against VAT fraud
- Ensure fair conditions of competition for EU entrepreneurs and e-commerce traders from third countries, as well as between e-commerce and traditional shops
- Higher revenues of the union member states as a result of fairer taxation

Until the introduction of the IOSS system, there was a VAT exemption on goods imported to the EU with a value from 0 to 22 euros, which meant that sellers in the EU were disadvantaged because they had to charge end customers with VAT, while sellers from a third country did not have to add value added tax (import value added tax) to the purchase price for long-distance purchases. However, for imported products from 22 to 150 euros the customer had to pay the VAT themselves, which resulted in sellers from third countries being disadvantaged because the customer often would have to pay high custom clearance fees when VAT was collected.

Between 23 and 150 €, the goods could be inspected at the customs, adding the VAT and the delivery company customs clearance fee. This is still the case when the seller isn't registered in the IOSS or when the value is above 150 €.

The IOSS lets the user know the total cost during the checkout. The VAT is included and the delivery company doesn't charge a customs clearance fee. The customs clearance is also much faster.

By abolishing the 22 euro VAT exemption for deliveries from third countries, it is estimated that more than 7 billion euros in additional taxes will be collected from the EU member states yearly.

== Implementation with IOSS ==
The IOSS allows suppliers selling imported goods to buyers in the EU (distance selling of goods) to collect the VAT applicable in the country of destination and pay it to the tax relevant authorities. Thus, under the IOSS the buyer is no longer obliged to pay VAT themselves at the time of importing the goods into the EU, as was the case before (for products over 22 euros).

IOSS thus facilitates the collection, declaration and payment of VAT for third-country sellers making distance sales of imported goods to buyers residing in the EU. As a result, the buyer is no longer surprised by hidden fees (taxes), such as high customs clearance fees for collecting VAT. However, if the third-country seller is not registered with the IOSS (which is voluntary), the buyer will still have to pay VAT and possibly a customs duty levied by the transport company (e.g. post office) at the time of importing the goods into the EU.

== Registration ==
Registration for companies has been possible since 1 April 2021 on the IOSS portal of any EU member state, and registration in a single union member state is sufficient. The company receives an IOSS identification number (also simply called an IOSS number). If a company is not based in the EU, it must also use an EU-based intermediary (a fiscal representative) to meet and guarantee its VAT obligations under the IOSS. The IOSS VAT number issued by a tax authority in a union member state, and is made available electronically to all other customs authorities in the EU. However, this database of IOSS VAT registration numbers is not public. When making a customs declaration, the customs authorities check the IOSS VAT identification number of the package against the database of IOSS VAT identification numbers. If the IOSS number is valid and the real value of the shipment does not exceed 150 euros, customs authorities do not require immediate payment of VAT on low-value goods registered through the IOSS.

== Non-participation in IOSS ==
If a company does not participate in IOSS, the customer must pay the VAT themselves when importing the goods into the EU. Postal operators or courier services can also charge the customer a handling fee to cover the costs then required for (customs) formalities when importing goods. Customers in the EU will only receive the ordered goods after paying the VAT. This can result in the customer refusing to accept the package in question because of the additional costs.

A seller which does not participate in IOSS must fulfill any customs and tax obligations separately in each EU member state to which they delivers, which may include registering there.

== Exceptions ==
If several goods are sold to the same buyer and if these goods exceed a value of 150 euro per package, these goods are taxed when imported into the EU member state (import sales tax). In the case of distance selling of goods through an electronic interface such as a marketplace or platform, the electronic interface is responsible for the overdue VAT. Goods that are subject to excise duties (e.g. alcohol or tobacco products) cannot be processed through the IOSS. Even if these excise goods are the subject of a distance sale from third countries, they are not covered by the IOSS regulations.

== See also ==
- EU OSS
- Non-EU OSS
- VOEC, a similar, but unrelated scheme implemented in Norway from 2020
