= 1996 Manx general election =

- 21 November 1996
- All 24 seats in the House of Keys
Party	Leader	Vote %	Seats	+/–
APG	Edgar Quine	14.62	6	New
Manx Labour		10.36	2	−1
Independents	–	75.02	16	−5
This lists parties that won seats. See the complete results below.
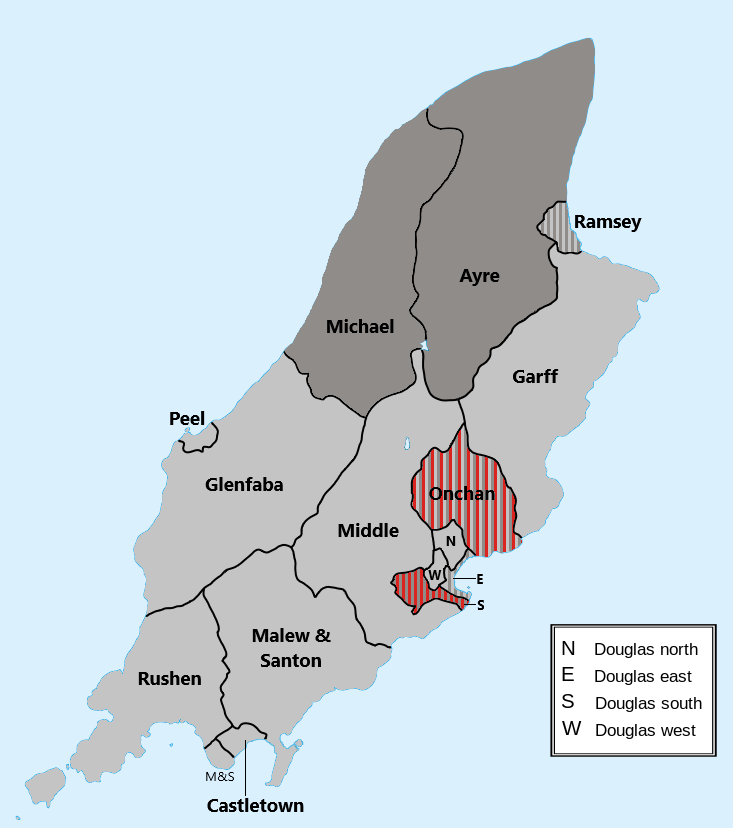
Results by constituency
Chief Minister before	Chief Minister after
Miles Walker; Independent	Donald Gelling; Independent

General elections were held on the Isle of Man on the 21 November 1996 to elect members to the House of Keys. Independents won 16 of the 24 seats, whilst the Manx Labour Party had its worst result since 1971, winning just two seats. The Alliance for Progressive Government contested its first general election after its formation following the 1991 general elections, winning six seats, including four incumbent MHKs who had previously been independents.

== Results ==
Party	Votes	%	Seats
Independents (Alliance for Progressive Government)	7,613	14.62	6
Manx Labour Party	5,392	10.36	2
Independents	39,052	75.02	16
Total	52,057	100.00	24
Source: Manx Radio, Kermode

=== By constituency ===
Constituency	Candidate	Votes
Ayre; 1 seat	Edgar Quine	1,247
Ayre; 1 seat	Hazel Bradley	167
Castletown; 1 seat	Tony Brown	876
Castletown; 1 seat	Elsie Pickard	467
Castletown; 1 seat	Carol Edge	102
Douglas East; 2 seats	Phil Braidwood	1,289
Douglas East; 2 seats	Brenda Cannell	836
Douglas East; 2 seats	Philip Kermode	593
Douglas East; 2 seats	Alan Burrows	381
Douglas North; 2 seats	John Houghton	1,493
Douglas North; 2 seats	Alan Crowe	1,241
Douglas North; 2 seats	Bernie May	827
Douglas North; 2 seats	Brian Crookall	612
Douglas South; 2 seats	David Cretney	2,061
Douglas South; 2 seats	Adrian Duggan	796
Douglas South; 2 seats	John Tobin	755
Douglas South; 2 seats	Patrick Bell	530
Douglas South; 2 seats	Allan Connor	282
Douglas South; 2 seats	John Cowley	247
Douglas West; 2 seats	John Shimmin	1,637
Douglas West; 2 seats	Alex Downie	1,515
Douglas West; 2 seats	Jim Cain	911
Garff; 1 seat	Steve Rodan	1,257
Garff; 1 seat	Stuart McKenzie	473
Garff; 1 seat	Kenneth Markillie	52
Glenfaba; 1 seat	Walter Gilbey	743
Glenfaba; 1 seat	Toni Collister	312
Malew and Santon; 1 seat	Donald Gelling	Unopposed
Michael; 1 seat	David Cannan	973
Michael; 1 seat	Jennifer Kewley Draskau	495
Middle; 1 seat	David North	842
Middle; 1 seat	Bruce Corfield	519
Onchan; 3 seats	Peter Karran	2,257
Onchan; 3 seats	Richard Corkill	1,713
Onchan; 3 seats	Ray Kniveton	1,702
Onchan; 3 seats	Richard Leventhorpe	1,372
Onchan; 3 seats	David Quirk	1,143
Onchan; 3 seats	Ellis Killey	775
Onchan; 3 seats	Mark Kermode	559
Peel; 1 seat	Hazel Hannan	1042
Peel; 1 seat	Christine Moughton	477
Peel; 1 seat	Timothy Crookall	469
Ramsey; 2 seats	Leonard Singer	2,059
Ramsey; 2 seats	Allan Bell	2,056
Ramsey; 2 seats	Terry Groves	1,763
Rushen; 3 seats	Miles Walker	2,499
Rushen; 3 seats	Noel Cringle	1,903
Rushen; 3 seats	Pamela Crowe	1,609
Rushen; 3 seats	Illiam Costain	1,568
Rushen; 3 seats	John Rimington	1,342
Rushen; 3 seats	David Bennett	774
Rushen; 3 seats	Terry Jackson	444
