= 2001 Manx general election =

- 22 November 2001

All 24 seats in the House of Keys
	First party	Second party	Third party
Party	Independents	APG	Manx Labour
Seats won	19	3	2
Seat change	▲3	▼3	Steady
Popular vote	38,596	4,059	4,261
Percentage	82.27%	8.65%	9.08%
Swing	▲7.27 pp	▼5.98 pp	▼1.29 pp
Chief Minister before election
Donald Gelling
Independent
Elected Chief Minister
Richard Corkill
Independent

General elections were held on the Isle of Man on 22 November 2001 to elect members to the island's lower house: the House of Keys. The election was dominated by Independents, who won 22 of the 24 seats.

== Results ==
Party	Votes	%	Seats
Manx Labour Party	4,261	9.08	2
Independents (Alliance for Progressive Government)	4,059	8.65	3
Independents	38,596	82.27	19
Total	46,916	100.00	24
Total votes	27,379	–	
Registered voters/turnout	47,529	57.60	
Source: Isle of Man Government, Manx Radio

=== By constituency ===
Constituency	Name	Party	Votes
Ayre; 1 seat	Edgar Quine MHK	Independent (APG)	1038
Ayre; 1 seat	Thurston Arrowsmith	Independent	202
Castletown; 1 seat	Tony Brown MHK	Independent	Unopposed
Douglas East; 2 seats	Phil Braidwood MHK	Independent	1,168
Douglas East; 2 seats	Brenda Cannell MHK	Independent (APG)	973
Douglas East; 2 seats	Colin Cain	Independent	474
Douglas East; 2 seats	Philip White	Independent	201
Douglas North; 2 seats	Bill Henderson	Independent	Unopposed
Douglas North; 2 seats	John Houghton MHK	Independent	Unopposed
Douglas South; 2 seats	David Cretney MHK	Manx Labour Party	1,956
Douglas South; 2 seats	Adrian Duggan	Independent	763
Douglas South; 2 seats	David Buttery	Independent	467
Douglas South; 2 seats	Rodney Clarke	Independent	394
Douglas South; 2 seats	Andrew Jessop	Independent	349
Douglas South; 2 seats	Gary Cain	Independent	273
Douglas West; 2 seats	Alex Downie	Independent	1,528
Douglas West; 2 seats	John Shimmin MHK	Independent	1,506
Douglas West; 2 seats	Michael Percival	Independent	628
Douglas West; 2 seats	Peter Murcott	Independent	253
Garff; 1 seat	Steve Rodan MHK	Independent	1,176
Garff; 1 seat	Marianne Kerruish	Independent	809
Glenfaba; 1 seat	David Anderson MHK	Independent	697
Glenfaba; 1 seat	Walter Gilbey	Independent	374
Glenfaba; 1 seat	Alan Kermode	Independent	205
Malew and Santon; 1 seat	Donald Gelling MHK	Independent	Unopposed
Michael; 1 seat	David Cannan MHK	Independent	898
Michael; 1 seat	Roy Kennaugh	Independent	630
Middle; 1 seat	Martyn Quayle MHK	Independent	613
Middle; 1 seat	Allen Gawne	Independent	555
Middle; 1 seat	Graham Crowe	Independent	539
Middle; 1 seat	Paul Beckett	Independent	124
Onchan; 3 seats	Peter Karran MHK	Manx Labour Party	2,305
Onchan; 3 seats	Richard Corkill	Independent	2,242
Onchan; 3 seats	Adrian Earnshaw MHK	Independent	1,929
Onchan; 3 seats	Geoff Cannell	Independent	1,624
Onchan; 3 seats	David Quirk	Independent	1,551
Onchan; 3 seats	Elizabeth Kelly	Independent	447
Peel; 1 seat	Hazel Hannan MHK	Independent	1,296
Peel; 1 seat	Christine Moughtin	Independent	505
Ramsey; 2 seats	Allan Bell MHK	Independent	2,260
Ramsey; 2 seats	Leonard Singer MHK	Independent (APG)	2,048
Ramsey; 2 seats	Annie Craine MHK	Independent	1,794
Ramsey; 2 seats	Brian Beattie	Independent	564
Ramsey; 2 seats	Joseph Rooney	Independent	116
Rushen; 3 seats	John Rimington MHK	Independent	1,919
Rushen; 3 seats	Quintin Gill MHK	Independent	1,856
Rushen; 3 seats	Pamela Crowe MHK	Independent	1,644
Rushen; 3 seats	Andrew Roy	Independent	1,633
Rushen; 3 seats	Phillip Crellin	Independent	1,564
Rushen; 3 seats	John Gill	Independent	826
