= 1991 Manx general election =

- 21 November 1991
- All 24 seats in the House of Keys
Party	Vote %	Seats	+/–
Independents	88.18	21	0
Manx Labour	11.23	3	0
This lists parties that won seats. See the complete results below.
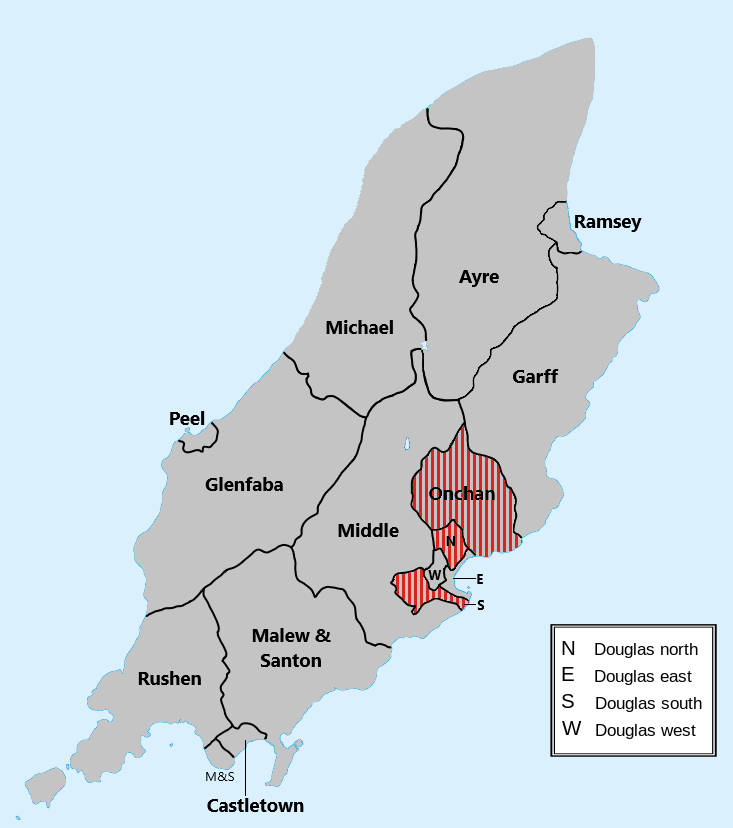
Results by constituency
Chief Minister before	Chief Minister after
Miles Walker; Independent	Miles Walker; Independent

General elections were held on the Isle of Man on the 21 November 1991 to elect members to the island's lower house: the House of Keys. Independents dominated and won 21 of the 24 seats, whilst the Manx Labour Party once again won three seats.

== Electoral system ==
The electoral system was changed in 1982 to single transferable vote with the Representation of the People (Preferential Voting) Act.

== Campaign ==
A total of 73 candidates contested the elections, of which 68 ran as independents and five as party candidates. The Manx Labour Party nominated three candidates, David Cretney, Peter Karran and Bernie May, all of whom were incumbents. The Green Party nominated two, John Rimington and Graham Joughin.

== Results ==
Five of the elected members were newcomers to the House of Keys.

In Douglas West, Basil Cowin and Jim Mitchell were tied in last place at the second count, resulting in them having to draw lots to determine who progressed to the third count, with Callow progressing. Two independent candidates (Edgar Quine in Ayre and Tony Brown in Castletown) were elected unopposed.

Party	FP votes	%	Seats
Manx Labour Party	3,419	11.23	3
Green Party	180	0.59	0
Independents	26,851	88.18	21
Total	30,450	100.00	24
Registered voters/turnout	46,007	–	
Source: Manx Radio, Kermode

=== By constituency ===
Douglas East
Candidate	Party	First preferences		Subsequent counts	
Candidate	Party	First preferences		2	3
Dominic Delaney	Independent	796	41.50		
Philip Kermode	Independent	522	27.22	610.25	667.25
Brenda Cannell	Independent	306	15.95	332.25	400.25
Patrick Bell	Independent	240	12.51	274.25	
Alan Shea	Independent	54	2.82	56.25	
Total		1,918	100.00	1,273	1,067.5
Valid votes		1,918	98.46		
Invalid votes		30	1.54		
Total votes		1,948	100.00		
Registered voters/turnout		3,678	52.96		

Douglas North
Candidate	Party	First preferences		Subsequent counts								
Candidate	Party	First preferences		2	3	4	5	6	7	8	9	10
Bernie May	Manx Labour Party	802	35.55									
David Corlett	Independent	370	16.40	337.2	380.2	383.2	392.68	401.68	414.04	422.34	443.8	474.8
Alan Crowe	Independent	289	12.81	284.16	294.16	301.28	306.52	310.58	329.64	351.7	365.18	381.18
David Martin	Independent	210	9.31	215.52	215.58	218.64	228.7	232.86	238	244.12	270.24	
Inkerman Faragher	Independent	160	7.09	116.12	168.24	175.3	190.36	208.66	218.72			
Raina Chatel	Independent	113	5.01	116.36	116.36	119.48	124.54	125.54	130.66			
John Bell	Independent	106	4.70	108.52	109.52	111.52	116.64	124.7				
Michael Hooper	Independent	81	3.59	82.26	83.26	87.26	89.32					
Michael Shimmin	Independent	57	2.53	59.27	61.27	63.27						
Graham Joughin	Green Party	47	2.08	48.5	49.56							
Martin Nuttall	Independent	21	0.93	21.42								
Total		2,256	100.00	1,389.33	1,478.15	1,459.95	1,448.76	1,404.02	1,331.06	1,018.16	1,079.22	855.98
Valid votes		2,256	98.26									
Invalid votes		40	1.74									
Total votes		2,296	100.00									
Registered voters/turnout		3,455	66.45									

Douglas South
Candidate	Party	First preferences		Subsequent counts			
Candidate	Party	First preferences		2	3	4	5
David Cretney	Manx Labour Party	1,422	56.99				
Adrian Duggan	Independent	479	19.20	780.2	792.2	799.4	860.4
Alan Connor	Independent	310	12.42	377.8	384.8	390.8	422.8
Fred Kennish	Independent	200	8.02	345.2	353.2	361	
Graham Bayliss	Independent	84	3.37	154.2			
Total		2,495	100.00	1,657.4	1,530.2	1,551.2	1,283.2
Valid votes		2,495	97.69				
Invalid votes		59	2.31				
Total votes		2,554	100.00				
Registered voters/turnout		4,257	60.00				

Douglas West
Candidate	Party	First preferences		Subsequent counts		
Candidate	Party	First preferences		2	3	4
James Cain	Independent	770	29.16	788	809	885
Alex Downie	Independent	616	23.32	632	655	737
Andrew Douglas	Independent	482	18.25	514	533	622
Charles Flynn	Independent	279	10.56	295	320	
Jim Mitchell	Independent	164	6.21	178	196	
Basil Cowin	Independent	164	6.21	178		
Richard Kennett	Independent	98	3.71			
Godfrey Kenyon	Independent	68	2.57			
Total		2,641	100.00	2,585	2,513	2,244
Valid votes		2,641	99.06			
Invalid votes		25	0.94			
Total votes		2,666	100.00			
Registered voters/turnout		3,994	66.75			

Garff
Candidate	Party	First count	
Candidate	Party	Votes	%
Edgar Mann	Independent	899	52.30
Stuart McKenzie	Independent	444	25.83
Harry Wade	Independent	376	21.87
Total		1,719	100.00
Valid votes		1,719	99.13
Invalid votes		15	0.87
Total votes		1,734	100.00
Registered voters/turnout		2,710	63.99

Glenfaba
Candidate	Party	First count	
Candidate	Party	Votes	%
Walter Gilbey	Independent	625	51.19
Robert Quayle	Independent	485	39.72
Greg Jougin	Independent	111	9.09
Total		1,221	100.00
Valid votes		1,221	99.84
Invalid votes		2	0.16
Total votes		1,223	100.00
Registered voters/turnout		1,628	75.12

Malew and Santon
Candidate	Party	First preferences					
Candidate	Party	First preferences		Donald Gelling	Independent	1,087	84.13
Ted Williams	Independent	140	10.84				
Frank Williams	Independent	65	5.03				
Total		1,292	100.00				
Valid votes		1,292	99.38				
Invalid votes		8	0.62				
Total votes		1,300	100.00				
Registered voters/turnout		1,961	66.29				

Michael
Candidate	Party	First count	
Candidate	Party	Votes	%
David Cannan	Independent	1,068	71.25
James Curphey	Independent	243	16.21
Lionel Morrey	Independent	188	12.54
Total		1,499	100.00
Valid votes		1,499	99.27
Invalid votes		11	0.73
Total votes		1,510	100.00
Registered voters/turnout		2,005	75.31

Middle
Candidate	Party	First count	
Candidate	Party	Votes	%
David North	Independent	924	55.70
John Wood	Independent	518	31.22
Peter Want	Independent	159	9.58
Brian Walker	Independent	58	3.50
Total		1,659	100.00
Valid votes		1,659	99.04
Invalid votes		16	0.96
Total votes		1,675	100.00
Registered voters/turnout		2,476	67.65

Onchan
Candidate	Party	First preferences		Subsequent counts		
Candidate	Party	First preferences		2	3	4
Peter Karran	Manx Labour Party	1,195	29.15			
Richard Corkill	Independent	999	24.37	1,052		
George Waft	Independent	707	17.24	751	794	914
Richard Leventhorpe	Independent	548	13.37	572	589	795
Roger Payne	Independent	241	5.88	256	278	
Fred Griffin	Independent	214	5.22	220	227	
Ken Ewart	Independent	108	2.63	117		
David Quirk	Independent	88	2.15	97		
Total		4,100	100.00	3,065	1,888	1,709
Valid votes		4,100	98.63			
Invalid votes		57	1.37			
Total votes		4,157	100.00			
Registered voters/turnout		6,209	66.95			

Peel
Candidate	Party	First preferences		Subsequent counts
Candidate	Party	First preferences		2
Hazel Hannan	Independent	942	45.16	1,066
Malcolm Kelly	Independent	627	30.06	799
Fred Crowe	Independent	517	24.78	
Total		2,086	100.00	1,865
Valid votes		2,086	96.93	
Invalid votes		66	3.07	
Total votes		2,152	100.00	
Registered voters/turnout		2,814	76.47	

Ramsey
Candidate	Party	First preferences		Subsequent counts			
Candidate	Party	First preferences		2	3	4	5
Allan Bell	Independent	1,023	31.16	1,040	1,072	1,095	
Terry Groves	Independent	909	27.69	925	951	987	1,032
Beryl Quine	Independent	744	22.66	757	768	805	872
Bill Irving	Independent	185	5.64	200	203	221	
John Quigley	Independent	178	5.42	182	194		
Francie Hughes	Independent	145	4.42	148			
Oliver Hibbert	Independent	99	3.02				
Total		3,283	100.00	3,252	3,188	3,108	1,904
Registered voters/turnout		4,786	–				

Rushen
Candidate	Party	First preferences		Subsequent counts				
Candidate	Party	First preferences		2	3	4	5	6
Miles Walker	Independent	1,488	34.76					
John Corrin	Independent	993	23.20	1,114.92				
Noel Cringle	Independent	520	12.15	616.64	633.54	659.35	717.28	815.38
John Orme	Independent	478	11.17	598	610.22	659.98	708.16	768.52
Cecil Price	Independent	322	7.52	355.92	361.77	397.29	458.34	
Illiam Costain	Independent	251	5.86	265.4	267.09	310.72		
John Rimington	Green Party	133	3.11	147.08	151.37			
Peter Ray	Independent	96	2.24	107.52	110.38			
Total		4,281	100.00	3,205.48	2,134.37	2,027.34	1,883.78	1,583.9
Valid votes		4,281	98.12					
Invalid votes		82	1.88					
Total votes		4,363	100.00					
Registered voters/turnout		6,034	72.31					

== Afternath ==
Following the general election a vote was held in Tynwald to elect the Chief Minister, with 23 members voting for the continuation of Miles Walker's government, and 10 voting for Edgar Mann. Five of those opposed to the Walker administration agreed to form the Alternative Policy Group with Mann as their leader, this was intended to function as an official opposition to the government, promoting greater autonomy for the island and more government accountability.
