= Same-sex marriage in the Isle of Man =

Same-sex marriage has been legal in the Isle of Man since 22 July 2016. Legislation to open marriage to same-sex couples passed the House of Keys on 8 March 2016 by a 17–3 vote and the Legislative Council on 26 April by a 6–3 vote. It received royal assent on 13 July and took effect nine days later. The Isle of Man was the first Crown Dependency of the United Kingdom to legalise same-sex marriage.

The Isle of Man has also recognised same-sex civil partnerships providing several, but not all, of the rights and benefits of marriage since 6 April 2011.

== Civil partnerships ==
Laws regarding same-sex partnerships in Europe¹ Marriage Civil union Limited domestic recognition (cohabitation) Unrecognized Constitution limits marriage to opposite-sex couples ¹ May include recent laws or court decisions that have not yet entered into effect.

As of 2005, couples who have entered into a civil partnership in the United Kingdom are recognised by the Department of Health and Social Care for pension purposes. The other rights of a civil partnership were not provided. In March 2009, Chief Minister Tony Brown announced that civil partnerships, known in Manx as commeeys theayagh (pronounced [kʰoˈmiːs tθiə̯x]), or shesheeys theayagh (pronounced [ʃɛˈʒiːs tθiə̯x]), would be introduced in the Isle of Man in October 2009. This bill would be modelled on the United Kingdom's Civil Partnership Act 2004, providing same-sex couples with nearly all of the rights and responsibilities of marriage.

In February 2010, the civil partnership bill was introduced by the Manx Government and had its first reading in the House of Keys. The bill was passed 19 to 3 in its second reading on 30 March. Further progress towards the passage of the bill was due to have taken place on 27 April, but was delayed for technical reasons. The bill passed the clauses stage on 25 May, and was approved in its third reading on 22 June. On 29 June, the bill had its first reading in the Legislative Council. It passed second reading on 26 October, the clauses stage on 9 November, and third reading on 23 November. The legislation was signed into law on 15 March 2011 by Lieutenant Governor Paul Haddacks, and took effect on 6 April 2011.

Same-sex marriages from England, Wales and Scotland were recognised as civil partnerships on the island from 2014 until legalisation in July 2016. Civil partnerships were opened to opposite-sex couples in the Isle of Man in 2016, alongside the legalisation of same-sex marriage.

== Same-sex marriage ==
=== Legislative action ===
On 9 June 2015, Chief Minister Allan Bell announced his intention to repeal the law barring same-sex marriage on the island. On 21 July, Bell ruled out holding a referendum on the issue. On 2 October 2015, the Chief Minister announced a public consultation on the issue to take place between 15 October and 13 November, with a bill allowing same-sex couples to marry to be introduced to Tynwald in 2016, depending on the results of the consultation. In November 2015, Bell announced that the same-sex marriage bill would have its first reading in Tynwald in December 2015 and would be implemented in 2016. On 19 December, Bell said that the bill would be submitted to the House of Keys in January, with the intention of having the law take effect by summer 2016. The government response to the public consultation was published on 22 January, with the Council of Ministers recommending that the bill be promptly introduced to the House of Keys for consideration.

The bill had its first reading in the House of Keys on 2 February 2016. On 9 February, the bill passed its second reading by a 18–4 vote. The measure passed the clauses stage on 1 March. Several amendments which would have allowed registrars to opt out of conducting same-sex marriages were rejected. One amendment the House did agree to was an amendment to allow opposite-sex couples to enter into civil partnerships. Consequently, the bill was renamed the Marriage and Civil Partnership (Amendment) Bill 2016. On 8 March, the bill was approved in its third reading in a 17–3 vote.

8 March 2016 vote in the House of Keys
Political affiliation	Voted for	Voted against	Abstained	Absent (Did not vote)
Independent	15: Allan Bell; Geoffrey Boot; Alfred Cannan; Graham Cregeen; Phil Gawne; Jonathan Joughin; William Malarkey; George Peake; Stephen Rodan; Richard Ronan; John Shimmin; Leonard Singer; Laurence Skelly; Christopher Thomas; Juan Watterson	3: Zac Hall; Chris Robertshaw; Eddie Teare	3: Ray Harmer; Howard Quayle; David Quirk	1: John Houghton
Liberal Vannin Party	2: Kathleen Beecroft; Peter Karran	–	–	–
Total	17	3	3	1
Total	70.8%	12.5%	12.5%	4.2%

On 22 March, the bill passed its first reading in the Legislative Council in a 6–3 vote. On 12 April, the bill passed through both the second reading, in a 5–3 vote, and the clauses stage, with three amendments proposed by Attorney General John Quinn. The bill was approved in its final reading on 26 April by a vote of 6–3.

26 April 2016 vote in the Legislative Council
Political affiliation	Voted for	Voted against	Abstained	Absent (Did not vote)
Elected members	6: Michael Coleman; David Cretney; Timothy Crookall; Bill Henderson; Juan Turner; Tony Wild	2: David Anderson; Geoff Corkish	–	–
Ex-officio members	–	1: Robert Paterson	–	–
Total (Note: The Legislative Council has 9 voting members. The President of Tynwald, Clare Christian, votes only in case of a tied vote, whereas the Attorney General, John Quinn, is a non-voting member.)	6	3	0	0
Total	66.7%	33.3%	0.0%	0.0%

On 10 May, the House of Keys approved the Council's amendments in a unanimous 22 to 0 vote. The bill was signed in Tynwald Court on 21 June. Some media reported that the bill was expected to be promulgated on 5 July, but it was delayed due a legal challenge lodged with the Privy Council. However, the Cabinet Office stated that the bill would receive royal assent (coardail reeoil) in the Privy Council, and be officially proclaimed during the Tynwald sitting on 19 July. The Chief Minister said that the European Union membership referendum was the reason for the delay, and that the law would take effect on 22 July. The law indeed received royal assent by Lieutenant Governor Adam Wood in the Privy Council on 13 July and was proclaimed on 19 July. It took effect three days later. The first same-sex marriage to be registered on the Isle of Man was that of Marc and Alex Steffan-Cowell, who converted their civil partnership into a marriage on 25 July 2016. The first same-sex marriage ceremony on the island occurred on 30 July between Luke Carine and Zak Tomlinson in the coastal town of Ramsey.

The Marriage and Civil Partnership (Amendment) Act 2016 (Manx: Slattys Poosee as Shesheeys Theayagh (Lhiasaghey) 2016, pronounced [ˈslaðəs pʰuːˈziː as ʃɛˈʒiːs tθiə̯x ˈlʲazaɣə]) contains a provision stating that:

Ayns leigh yn Ellan, ta'n vree cheddin ec poosey bentyn da cubbil jeh'n cheintys cheddin myr t'echey bentyn da cubbil jeh keintyssyn contraartagh.

(In the law of the Island, marriage has the same effect in relation to same sex couples as it has in relation to opposite sex couples.)

=== Subsequent changes ===
In August 2023, Tanya August-Phillips announced her intention to introduce legislation granting automatic recognition to same-sex parents and allow both parents to be named on a birth certificate. The proposal would bring the Isle of Man's laws in line with the United Kingdom's Human Fertilisation and Embryology Act 2008. A draft bill was introduced to the Legislative Council in June 2024. It passed its final stages in the Tynwald on 25 June 2025.

=== Statistics ===
There were 351 marriages performed on the Isle of Man in 2018, of which 6 (1.7%) were between same-sex couples.

=== Religious performance ===
In February 2023, the General Synod of the Church of England, which has one diocese in the Isle of Man, voted 250–181 to allow clergy to bless same-sex marriages. The measure took effect on 17 December 2023. The second largest Christian denomination on the island, the Methodist Church of Great Britain, has allowed its ministers to conduct same-sex marriages since 2021. The Methodist Conference voted 254 to 46 in favour of the move in June 2021. A freedom of conscience clause allows ministers with objections to opt out of performing same-sex weddings. In November 2023, two congregations of the Methodist Church, the Trinity Methodist Church and the Promenade Methodist Church, both in Douglas, announced they would be performing same-sex marriages in their local churches. The smaller United Reformed Church has allowed its churches to perform same-sex marriages since 2016. Quakers formally expressed support for same-sex marriage in 2009.

== See also ==
- LGBT rights in the Isle of Man
- Same-sex marriage in the United Kingdom
- Recognition of same-sex unions in Europe
