= Miles Walker =

Manx businessman and politician; first Chief Minister of the Isle of Man

Sir Miles Walker

Chief Minister of the Isle of Man
- In office 3 December 1986 – 3 December 1996
- Monarch: Elizabeth II
- Governor: Laurence New
- Preceded by: Edgar Mann (as Chairman of the Executive Council)
- Succeeded by: Donald Gelling

Personal details
- Born: Miles Rawstron Walker; 13 November 1940 (age 85) Isle of Man
- Party: Independent
- Spouse(s): Mary, Lady Walker (m. 1966–present)
- Children: 2
- Profession: Politician, businessman

Sir Miles Rawstron Walker CBE (born 13 November 1940) is a Manx businessman and politician, who was the first ever Chief Minister of the Isle of Man.

== Early life and career ==
Born on 13 November 1940 to George Denis Walker and Alice (née Whittaker) of Belle Abbey in Colby, he was educated at Castle Rushen High School and the Shropshire Agricultural College. He later went on to become a company director in the farming and retail dairy trade. He was an Arbory commissioner (a local government role) from 1970 until 1976, latterly as the chairman. In 1976 he was elected as an MHK for Rushen. He remained an MHK until he retired at the 2001 General Election. In 1986 he was elected as the island's first ever Chief Minister, and continued in the post until the 1996 election. He was honoured as Commander of the Order of the British Empire (CBE) in 1991. He was awarded an honorary doctorate (LL.D.) in 1994 by Liverpool University, and was knighted in 1997.

== Personal life ==
Sir Miles has been married to Mary since 1966; they have one son and one daughter together and live in Colby, Isle of Man.

== Government positions ==
- Chairman of Tromode House Committee, 1977–80
- Chairman of the Broadcasting Commission, 1979–81
- Chairman of the Local Government Board, 1981–86
- Chairman of the Income Tax Commission, 1985–86
- Member of the Executive Council, 1981–90
- Chief Minister, 1986–96

== Walker's Councils of Ministers ==
Office	Name	Term
Chief Minister	Sir Miles Walker	1986–96
Minister of the Treasury	David Cannan	1986–89
	Donald Gelling	1989–96
Minister of Home Affairs	Edmund Lowey	1986–91
	Arnold Callin	1991–95
	Richard Corkill	1995–96
Minister of Health and Social Security	Tony Brown	1986–89
	Jim Cain	1989–91
	Bernie May	1991–96
Minister of Education	Victor Kneale	1986–90
	Ron Cretney	1990–91
	Hazel Hannan	1991–95
	Noel Cringle	1995–96
Minister of Industry	Ian Anderson	1986–88
	Bernie May	1988–91
	Allan Bell	1991–?
Minister of Trade and Industry	Allan Bell	?–1994
Minister of Tourism and Transport	Allan Bell	1986–90
Minister of Tourism, Leisure and Transport	Allan Bell	1990–94
Minister of Tourism and Leisure	Tony Brown	1994–96
Minister of Highways, Ports and Properties	Arnold Callin	1986–91
	David North	1991–94
Minister of Transport	David North	1994–96
Minister of Agriculture, Fisheries and Forestry	Don Maddrell	1986–88
	Donald Gelling	1988–89
	David North	1989–91
	John Corrin	1991–95
	Hazel Hannan	1995–96
Minister of Local Government and the Environment	Dominic Delaney	1986–89
	Tony Brown	1989–94
	Terry Groves	1994–96

== Business positions ==
- Chairman of Hospice Isle of Man, 2010–present
- Chairman of the Sefton Group plc., 2010–present

Preceded by Edgar Mann (as Chairman of the Executive Council)	Chief Minister; 1986–96	Succeeded by Donald James Gelling CBE CP
