= Richard Corkill =

Manx politician (born 1951)

Richard Kenneth Corkill (born 1951) was the Chief Minister of the Isle of Man from December 2001 until December 2004, and was an elected member of the House of Keys from 1991 to 2006. He was born in Douglas. He was elected by Tynwald with 21 votes, defeating Edgar Quine, who received 10 votes.

He resigned as chief minister after he and his wife were arrested on allegations of fraud regarding tourist grants.

== Governmental positions ==
- Minister of Home Affairs, 1995–1996
- Minister of the Treasury, 1996–2001
- Chief Minister, 2001–2004

== The Corkill Council ==
| OFFICE | NAME | TERM |
| Chief Minister | Richard Corkill | 2001–2004 |
| Minister of the Treasury | Allan Bell | 2001–present |
| Minister of Home Affairs | Phil Braidwood | 2001–2005 |
| Minister of Health and Social Security | Clare Christian | 1996–2004 |
| | Steve Rodan | 2004–2006 |
| Minister of Education | Steve Rodan | 1999–2004 |
| | David Anderson | 2004–2006 |
| Minister of Trade and Industry | Alex Downie | 2001–2006 |
| Minister of Tourism and Leisure | David Cretney | 1996–2006 |
| Minister of Transport | John Shimmin | 2001–2005 |
| Minister of Agriculture, Fisheries and Forestry | John Rimmington | 2001–2004 |
| | Bill Henderson | 2004–2005 |
| Minister of Local Government and the Environment | Pamela Crowe | 2001–2004 |
| | John Rimmington | 2004–2006 |

=== Council changes ===
In what would have been a mid term shake up, Mr Corkill replaced MLCs Clare Christian and Pamela Crowe who has come under fire as Health and DLGE ministers respectively. Steve Rodan was promoted to Health Minister and Bill Henderson and David Anderson were given their first jobs in the council.

| Preceded by Donald James Gelling (1st Time) | Chief Minister; 2001–2004 | Succeeded by Donald James Gelling (2nd Time) |
