= Charles Kerruish =

Manx politician (1917–2003)

Sir Charles Kerruish OBE LLD CP MLC

President of Tynwald
- In office 10 October 1990 – 11 April 2000
- Monarch: Elizabeth II
- Governor: Ronald Garvey
- Preceded by: Sir Laurence New (governor)
- Succeeded by: Noel Cringle

Speaker of the House of Keys
- In office February 1962 – 10 October 1990
- Preceded by: Henry Corlett
- Succeeded by: Victor Kneale

Member of the House of Keys
- In office 26 September 1946 – 10 October 1990
- Preceded by: Walter Cowin
- Succeeded by: Lt.Col. Mann
- Constituency: Garff

Personal details
- Born: 23 July 1917 Ballafayle, Maughold, Isle of Man
- Died: 2 August 2003 (aged 86) Isle of Man
- Party: Independent
- Spouse(s): Margaret Gell (d. 1970, her death); Kathleen Warriner (w. 2003, his death)
- Children: 4, including Clare and Anne
- Profession: Politician

Sir Henry Charles Kerruish OBE LLD CP MLC (23 July 1917 – 2 August 2003) was a Manx politician who was the first President of Tynwald and, as Speaker of the House of Keys from 1962 to 1990, was the longest-serving Speaker in any Parliament in the Commonwealth. He was also the first Chairman of the Executive Council, the forerunner of the present Chief Minister of the Isle of Man, from 1961 to 1967. This made him the first Manx person to fulfil an executive role on the Isle of Man. Previously the Lieutenant Governor had exercised all executive power. He was a keen supporter of Scouting on the Isle of Man, often offering his own lands for camping.

During the 1986 Chernobyl disaster, a easterly wind brought much contaminated fallout across Europe, including the Isle of Man. Charles Kerruish disdained from culling his mouton based around Snaefell. He subsequently sold his slaughtered animals to the Manx population for consumption.

Unlike some of his contemporaries at the time, he devotedly supported the un-elected Legislative Council.

== Early life ==
Kerruish was born and raised at Ballafayle in the parish of Maughold. Kerruish attended Dhoon School and Ramsey Grammar School.
