= Juan Turner =

Manx politician (born 1974)

Former Member of the Legislative Council of the Isle of Man
- In office 22 May 2007 – 28 February 2018

Personal details
- Born: 19 October 1974 (age 52)

Juan Richard Turner (born 19 October 1974) is a Manx politician and radio broadcaster who served in the Legislative Council of the Isle of Man from 2007 until 2018. Prior to entering politics, he worked as a producer at Manx Radio, ITV, and the BBC. In 2001, he founded the radio station Energy FM, and worked as its managing director until 2007.

Turner was first elected to the legislative council in 2007, and was subsequently re-elected in 2008 and 2013. While in the council, he was an advocate for Manx autonomy from the laws of the United Kingdom.

== Legislative committees ==
- Department of Trade and Industry, 2007–09
- Department of Transport, 2008–10
- Department of Tourism and Leisure, 2009
- Department of Agriculture, Fisheries and Forestry, 2009–10
- Department of Environment, Food and Agriculture, 2010–2014
- Department of Community, Culture and Leisure, 2011–2013
- Department of Infrastructure, 2014-2016
- Department of Home Affairs, 2014-2018

DTI Rep for Manx Electricity Authority 2008-2010
