= Onchan (parish) =

Historic parish of the Isle of Man

Coordinates: 54.174°N 4.439°W

Onchan: Manx: Connaghyn
- Parish of Onchan, Isle of Man
- Population: 1,591
- OS grid reference: SC408781
- Sheading: Middle
- Crown dependency: Isle of Man
- Post town: ISLE OF MAN
- Postcode district: IM3
- House of Keys: Onchan

Onchan (/ˈɒŋkən/ ONK-ən; Manx: Connaghyn), historically Kirk Conchan, is one of the seventeen historic parishes of the Isle of Man.

It is located on the east of the island (part of the traditional South Side division) in the sheading of Middle, though before 1796 it was in the sheading of Garff.

Administratively, part of the historic parish of Onchan is now covered by part of the borough of Douglas, the capital and largest town of the Isle of Man.

== Local government ==
For the purposes of local government, most of the historic parish forms a single district with Commissioners.

In 1896, an area in the south-west of the historic parish of Onchan became part of the borough of Douglas, since when it has been governed by a municipal corporation with 18 councillors and an elected mayor.

The district of Onchan was formed in 1986 by the re-amalgamation of two local authority areas, Onchan village and the larger rural area of Onchan parish. These two local authority areas had been separated from one another in 1895.

The Captain of the Parish (since 2011) is Peter Kelly, MBE.

== Politics ==
Onchan parish is split between two House of Keys constituencies: Onchan, covering the built-up area of Onchan village, and the Garff constituency, which includes the larger rural area of Onchan parish. Each constituency elects two Members to the House of Keys. From 1986 until 2016 the whole of Onchan was its own constituency, and before 1986 it was in the Middle constituency.

The part of the historic parish which falls under the Borough of Douglas elects MHKs to one or more of the Douglas constituencies.

== Geography ==
The village of Onchan (formerly known as Kirk Conchan, as it was dedicated to St Conchan) is situated on a headland to the north of Douglas, of which it is a suburb, and has good views over Douglas Bay. The parish stretches from Windy Corner on the TT course in the north to Port Groudle and the town of Douglas in the south; it is bounded to the west by the River Glass and the East Baldwin Valley, to the east by the parish of Lonan and to the south by the Irish Sea. The main settlement in the parish is the village of Onchan which has the second largest population on the island.

The coastline comprises the northern part of Douglas Bay and the Banks' Howe headland, which is 120 metres (390 ft) high. The highest peak in the parish is Cairn Gerjoil, near Windy Corner, at 445 metres (1,460 ft).

The parish is largely agricultural and has only one centre of population, Onchan village. Apart from the hilly region in the north west, it is a fertile and well-cultivated district. Along the hillside near Douglas there are country villas. The parish also has several large reservoirs that store water for Douglas and the surrounding villages.

The parish has three National Glens: Molly Quirk's Glen, Groudle Glen and Bibaloe Walk, which end at Groudle Beach, where there is holiday accommodation. The Groudle Glen Railway runs for a short distance along the coast from Lhen Coan to the Headland and then on to the terminus at Sea Lion Rocks, where passengers can alight and see the remains of the Victorian zoo which until World War II housed sea lions and polar bears.

Like the other parishes on the island, Onchan was historically subdivided into "treens": areas of land bounded by natural features such as rivers. According to the 1511 Manorial Roll, Onchan contained the following treens:

- Slekby
- Alia-Begod
- Begod (now Bygoad)
- Byballo (now Bibaloe)
- Hawstrake (now Howstrake)
- Horaldre
- Tremsare
- Tremott
- Douglas

== Onchan wetlands ==
The Onchan wetlands (Manx: Curragh Kiondroghad) is a 1-acre (4,000 m^{2}) reserve in Onchan village which contains a variety of habitats. The site was donated to the Manx Wildlife Trust in 1988. It is open to the public for viewing and has a boardwalk which is suitable for wheelchair users.

The site contains curragh (wetlands - willow scrub), broadleaved trees, dub (pond), neutral grassland and embankments of tall grassland. This variety of habitats leads to a diversity of wildlife and plant life. Some of the plants/trees that grow there are silver birch, ash, holly, rowan, marsh marigold, yellow flag, reed canary grass, hemlock water-dropwort, woody nightshade and cuckoo flower. Among the wide variety of birds on the site are the grey wagtail, goldcrest, woodcock, chiffchaff and hen harrier. There are also invertebrates, bats, and many frogs and spawn in early summer.

== MHKs and elections ==
Year	Election	Turnout	Candidates	Notes
1986	General Election	67.2%	Peter Karran (Lab) (1075 votes, elected); Richard Leventhorpe (916 votes, elected); Don Maddrell (766 votes, elected); FE Griffin (508 votes); RA Payne (477 votes); FD Crompton (87 votes)	
1988	By Election	48.7%	Ron Cretney (1436 votes, elected); Lieutenant Colonel Dr Edgar Mann (748 votes); PKS Leventhorpe (421 votes); David Quirk (188 votes)	
1991	General Election	66.9%	Peter Karran (Lab) (1195 votes, elected); Richard Corkill (999 votes, elected); George Waft (707 votes, elected); Richard Leventhorpe (548 votes); RA Payne (241 votes); FE Griffin(214 votes); KE Ewart (108 votes); David Quirk (88 votes)	Ron Cretney retired from politics and Richard Leventhorpe was defeated by George Waft and future Chief Minister Richard Corkill.
1994	By Election	44.7%	Ray Kniveton (1283 votes, elected); Richard Leventhorpe (939 votes); David Quirk (590 votes)	Called following the elevation to the LegCo of George Waft
1996	General Election	57.8%	Peter Karran (Lab) (2257 votes, elected); Richard Corkill (1713 votes, elected); Ray Kniveton (1702 votes, elected); Richard Leventhorpe (1372 votes); David Quirk (1143 votes); Ellis Killey (775 votes); Mark Kermode (559 votes)	The three sitting MHKs all held their seats.
1998	By Election	?	Geoff Cannell, elected	Called following the elevation to the LegCo of Ray Kniveton.
2001	General Election	57%	Peter Karran (Lab) (2305 votes, elected); Richard Corkill (2243 votes, elected); Adrian Earnshaw (1929 votes, elected); Geoff Cannell (1624 votes); David Quirk (1551 votes); Elizabeth Kelly (447 votes)	Labour's Peter Karran and Chief Minister Richard Corkill both held their seats with increased votes, while challenger Adrian Earnshaw defeated sitting MHK Geoff Cannell to take the third seat.
2006	General Election	60.8%	Peter Karran (LVP) (2600 votes, elwected); Adrian Earnshaw (2078 votes, elected); David Quirk (1565 votes, elected); Brian Stowell (1373 votes); Steve Babb (1047 votes); Andrew Dossor (601 votes)	Former Chief Minister Richard Corkill did not stand.
2011	General Election	57.5%	Peter Karran (LVP) (2074 votes, elected); Zac Hall (LVP) (1812 votes, elected); David Quirk (1594 votes, elected); Adrian Earnshaw (1543 votes); June Kelly (1339 votes); Brian Stowell (1093 votes)	Liberal Vannin challenger Zac Hall defeated sitting MHK Adrian Earnshaw

== Elections results since 2016 ==
In 2014, Tynwald approved recommendations from the Boundary Review Commission which saw the reform of the Island's electoral boundaries.

Under the new system, the Island was divided into 12 constituencies based on population, with each area represented by two members of the House of Keys.

As a result Onchan's electoral boundaries were changed significantly, with much of the north-easterly part of the village and the parish's rural areas becoming part the enlarged Garff constituency.

General election 2021: Onchan
Party	Candidate	Votes	%
Independent	Rob Edward Callister	1,600	38.6
Independent	Julie Marie Edge	1,363	32.9
Independent	James Alexander Cherry	570	13.8
Liberal Vannin	Peter Alan Willers	433	10.5
Independent	John Michael Leather	177	4.3
Total votes		4,143	
Total ballots		2,335	
Rejected ballots		11	
Turnout		2,346	45.1
Registered electors		5,200	

General election 2016: Onchan
Party	Candidate	Votes	%
Independent	Rob Edward Callister	1,272	28.9
Liberal Vannin	Julie Marie Edge	953	21.7
Independent	Timothy Roy Craig	841	19.1
Independent	David John Quirk	822	18.7
Independent	Anthony Allen	510	11.6
Total votes		4,398	
Total ballots		2,436	
Rejected ballots		11	
Turnout		2,447	49.0
Registered electors		4,997	
