= Kerry Sharpe =

Manx politician

Member of the Legislative Council of the Isle of Man
- Incumbent
- Assumed office March 2018

Personal details
- Born: Isle of Man, United Kingdom
- Spouse: Ian Sharpe
- Education: St Catharine's College, Cambridge
- Occupation: Journalist

Kerry Sharpe is a member of the Legislative Council of the Isle of Man, having been elected in March 2018 and re-elected in March 2020.

Sharpe graduated from St Catharine's College, Cambridge.
