= Juan McGuinness =

Manx politician

Member of the House of Keys for Ramsey
- Incumbent
- Assumed office September 2026 Serving with Robert Cowell

Personal details
- Born: Ramsey, Isle of Man
- Party: Independent
- Occupation: Politician; financial services compliance professional

Juan McGuinness is a Manx politician who has served as an independent member of the House of Keys for Ramsey since 2026. Previously a member of Ramsey Town Commissioners for ten years, he was elected to the House of Keys at the 2026 Manx general election.

== Early life ==
McGuinness was born and grew up in Ramsey. McGuinness attended Auldyn Infants School, Albert Road School and Ramsey Grammar School.

== Career ==
Before entering national politics, McGuinness worked in the Isle of Man's financial services industry, specialising in compliance.

=== Local government ===
McGuinness served on Ramsey Town Commissioners from 2016 until September 2026. He held finance responsibilities within the local authority and was named lead member of its Finance Committee following the April 2025 local elections.

He also chaired the Northern Local Authority Swimming Pool Board. In 2022, he supported a review of the funding and governance of regional swimming pools, arguing that they should be treated as community facilities rather than expected to generate profits.

In July 2025, Ramsey Town Commissioners agreed to a motion proposed by McGuinness to develop a long-term social housing strategy, setting objectives over five, ten and 25 years. He proposed public accountability meetings for the Commissioners, the first of which took place in September 2025.

=== House of Keys ===
At the general election on 24 September 2026, McGuinness topped the poll in Ramsey with 1,703 votes. He and fellow independent Robert Cowell won the constituency's two seats; incumbent Lawrie Hooper was not re-elected. During the campaign, McGuinness identified housing, healthcare and issues affecting Ramsey as his main priorities.

In October 2026, he was appointed a political member of both the Cabinet Office and Department of Infrastructure. On 29 October, Chief Minister Chris Thomas appointed him chair of the Public Services Commission. The appointment also made him vice-chair of the Public Sector Pensions Authority.
