= Chief Minister of the Isle of Man =

Executive head of the Manx government

- Ard-Shirveishagh
- Arms of His Majesty in right of the Isle of Man
- Incumbent; Chris Thomas; MHK since 13 October 2026
- Office of the Chief Minister
- Style: Honourable
- Member of: Council of Ministers
- Seat: Douglas, Isle of Man
- Nominator: House of Keys
- Appointer: Lieutenant Governor of the Isle of Man; on the nomination of and from among the members of the House of Keys
- Term length: 5 years
- Constituting instrument: Council of Ministers Act 1990
- Precursor: Chair of Executive Council
- Formation: 16 December 1986
- First holder: Miles Walker
- Salary: £98,679.10
- Website: www.gov.im

The Chief Minister (Manx: Ard-Shirveishagh) is the executive head of the Isle of Man Government.

The office derives from that of chairman of the Executive Council. Before 1980 the Executive Council was chaired by the lieutenant governor, but thereafter the chairman was elected by Tynwald, the parliament of the Isle of Man. The title was changed to "chief minister" in 1986.

The chief minister is appointed by the lieutenant governor on the nomination of the House of Keys (formerly the nomination of Tynwald) after a general election for the House of Keys. He holds office until the next general election (i.e. normally for five years) and is eligible for re-appointment, but may be removed from office by simple majority in Tynwald on a vote of no confidence in the Council of Ministers.

The incumbent chief minister is Chris Thomas, who has held the office since 13 October 2026.

== List of officeholders ==
Prior to 1986, the office of chief minister was known as the chairman of the Executive Council.

No.	Chief Minister	Took office	Left office	Tenure	Party	Election
=== Chairmen of the Executive Council ===
1	Sir; Charles Kerruish (1917–2003); MHK for Garff	1961	1967	6 years	Independent	TBA
2	Norman Crowe (1905–1992); MHK for Michael	1967	1971	5 years	Independent	TBA
3	Percy Radcliffe (1916–1991); MHK for Ayre; 1st time	1971	1977	6 years	Independent	TBA
4	Clifford Irving (1914–2004); MHK for Douglas East	1977	1981	4 years	Independent	TBA
(3)	Percy Radcliffe (1916–1991); MHK for Ayre; 2nd time	1981	1985	4 years	Independent	TBA
5	Lt Col; Edgar Mann (1926–2013); MHK for Garff	1985	1986	1 year	Independent	TBA
=== Chief Ministers ===
1	Sir; Miles Walker (born 1940); MHK for Rushen	3 December 1986	3 December 1996	10 years, 0 days	Independent	1986
1	Sir; Miles Walker (born 1940); MHK for Rushen	3 December 1986	3 December 1996	10 years, 0 days	Independent	1991
2	Donald Gelling (born 1938); MHK for Malew and Santon; 1st time	3 December 1996	4 December 2001	5 years, 1 day	Independent	1996
3	Richard Corkill (born 1951); MHK for Onchan	4 December 2001	14 December 2004 (Note: Corkill resigned after he and his wife were arrested on allegations of fraud regarding tourist grants.)	3 years, 10 days	Independent	2001
–	Allan Bell (born 1947); MHK for Ramsey; Caretaker; 1st time	14 December 2004		1 day	Independent	Chairman of the Council of Ministers acting as chief minister
(2)	Donald Gelling (born 1938); MHK for Malew and Santon; 2nd time	14 December 2004	14 December 2006	2 years, 0 days	Independent	–
4	Tony Brown (born 1950); MHK for Castletown	14 December 2006	11 October 2011	4 years, 301 days	Independent	2006
5	Allan Bell (born 1947); MHK for Ramsey; 2nd time	11 October 2011	4 October 2016	4 years, 359 days	Independent	2011
6	Howard Quayle (born 1967); MHK for Middle	4 October 2016	12 October 2021	5 years, 8 days	Independent	2016
7	Alfred Cannan (born 1968); MHK for Ayre & Michael	12 October 2021	13 October 2026	5 years, 1 day	Independent	2021
8	Chris Thomas (born TBA); MHK for Douglas Central	13 October 2026	Incumbent	16 days	Independent	2026

== Timeline ==
This is a graphical lifespan timeline of chief ministers of the Isle of Man, with the chairmen of the Executive Council also being included. In total, thirteen people have served as either chairman of the Executive Council or chief minister of the Isle of Man since 1961. They are listed in the order in which they first assumed the office (acting officeholders are not listed).

== See also ==
- Chief Minister
- Chairman of the Executive Council, this office's predecessor
