= Waft =

Waft may refer to:

- WAFT, Christian radio station in Valdosta, Georgia, U.S.
- George Waft (1939–2026), Isle of Man politician
