= John Corlett =

John Corlett may refer to:

- John Corlett (attorney general), Isle of Man attorney general
- John Corlett (MP), British member of parliament
