= David Callister =

Manx politician (1935–2020)

David Callister, MLC
- Born: David Alexander Callister; 23 March 1935; Isle of Man
- Died: 27 February 2020 (aged 84)
- Occupation: Politician/Broadcaster
- Years active: 1983–2008 (broadcaster); 2008–2020 (politician)
- Employers: Isle of Man Government /; Manx Radio
- Spouse: Ann Popplewell (m. 1960)
- Children: 4

David Alexander Callister, MLC (23 March 1935 – 27 February 2020) was a Manx politician and broadcaster, who was a member of the Legislative Council of the Isle of Man. He defeated Pamela Crowe in 2008. He was also known as a broadcaster on Manx Radio.

He died on 27 February 2020.

== Early life ==
Callister was born on 23 March 1935 to Harold Clarke Callister and Mildred Callister (née Corrin).

== Personal life ==
Callister was married to Ann (née Popplewell) from 1960 until his death. They had 4 children together.
