= Rob Mercer =

Manx politician

Rob Mercer is an IT consultant and a member of the Legislative Council of the Isle of Man, having been elected on 12 March 2020

== Parliamentary positions ==
- Chair of the Environment & Infrastructure Policy Review Committee, Nov 2021–Present
- Member of the Tynwald Management Committee, 2020–present
- Member of the Standing Committee on the Business and Functioning of the Council, 2020–present
- Member of the Tynwald Standards and Members Interests Committee, 2020–present

== Previous Parliamentary positions ==
- Member of the Environment & Infrastructure Policy Review Committee, 2020–Oct 2021
