= Edmund Lowey =

Manx politician (1938–2024)

- Born: 12 February 1938; Ballasalla, Isle of Man
- Died: 22 May 2024 (aged 86); Isle of Man
- Education: Castle Rushen High School
- Occupation: Politician
- Years active: 1975–2024
- Employer: Isle of Man Government

Edmund Lowey (12 February 1938 – 22 May 2024) was a Manx politician, who was a member of the Legislative Council in the Isle of Man from 1982 to 2013.

== Early life ==
Edmund was born in 1938 in Ballasalla and was educated at Castle Rushen and then worked for the Ronaldsway Aircraft Company from 1964, until 1975. He then stood for the Manx Labour Party in the House of Keys election of 1975 and was elected as one of the MHKs for Rushen. He continued in this position until his elevation to the Council in 1982. He held several ministerial posts under Sir Miles Walker and was also a vice chairman of the Manx Labour Party.

Lowey died on 22 May 2024, at the age of 86.

== Ministerial positions ==
- Chairman of the Consumer Council, 1976–81
- Chairman of the Tourism Board, 1981–86
- Minister of Home Affairs, 1986–91
- Minister without Portfolio, 1991–92
- Minister of Industry, 1992–96
- Chairman of the Manx Electricity Authority, 2011–2013
