= Anne Craine =

Manx politician (born 1954)

- Born: Anne Valerie Craine; 30 April 1954 (age 71); Douglas, Isle of Man
- Education: Dhoon School; Ramsey Grammar School
- Occupation: Politician
- Years active: 1992–present
- Employer: Isle of Man Government
- Spouse: David Craine (m. 1978)
- Children: 3

Anne Valerie Craine (born 30 April 1954) is a Justice of the Peace from the Isle of Man.

== Early life ==
Craine grew up in Maughold village. Craine went to primary school at Dhoon School in Glen Mona and then attended Ramsey Grammar School. She studied at St Godfric's Secretarial College in London.

Craine served as a justice of the peace in the Isle of Man from 2000 to 2003. She was elected to the House of Keys at the 2003 by-election for the Keys constituency of Ramsey.

== Career ==
In 2005 she succeeded Phil Gawne as Minister for Agriculture, Fisheries and Forestry. In the island's 2006 General Election, Anne Craine topped the poll in Ramsey. She won 1,969 votes and Allan Bell claimed the second seat in the town with 1,768 votes. Despite having been an MHK for only three years, she saw off tough competition from Leonard Singer, who had resigned as an MLC in order to stand for the Keys, but was unsuccessful with 1,621 votes.

Craine was Minister of Education between 2006 and 2010, and Minister for the Treasury between 2010 and 2011, succeeding Allan Bell from 1 April. In 2011, she lost her Ramsey seat to Leonard Singer.

== Governmental positions ==
While in government Craine presided over the 27th Commonwealth's Small Countries Conference at the 53rd Commonwealth Parliamentary Conference in Delhi in September 2007.

Craine had the following posts in the Manx government:

- Minister for the Treasury, 2010–2011
- Minister of Education, 2006–2010

== Personal life ==
Craine married David Craine in 1978 and they have two sons and a daughter.

Her sister is the politician Clare Christian.
