= Geoff Cannell =

Manx politician & sports broadcaster (1942-2007)

Geoffrey Thornton Cannell (July 1, 1942 – September 24, 2007) was a Member of the House of Keys (MHK) and a sports broadcaster in the Isle of Man.

== Biography ==
Geoff Cannell was born on July 1, 1942, in Douglas and educated on the Island. Apart from his brief spell in the House of Keys and another in the Tourist Board from 1978 he worked for Manx Radio as press officer, sports editor and news editor. He generally is well known for covering major sports events, especially the TT and also for his coverage of Tynwald.

In 1998, he was elected the MHK for Onchan, following Ray Kniveton's elevation to the Legislative Council. However, he lost his seat at the 2001 Manx General Election to Adrian Earnshaw by some 300 votes.

He suffered a stroke on September 24, 2007, and died several hours later at the island's Noble's Hospital.

== Personal life ==
Geoff Cannell was married to Lynda (who died on January 18, 2021) for 34 years and they have one child, Zoe.

== Death ==
Geoff Cannell died on September 24, 2007, at the age of 65.
