= Marlene Hendy =

Manx politician

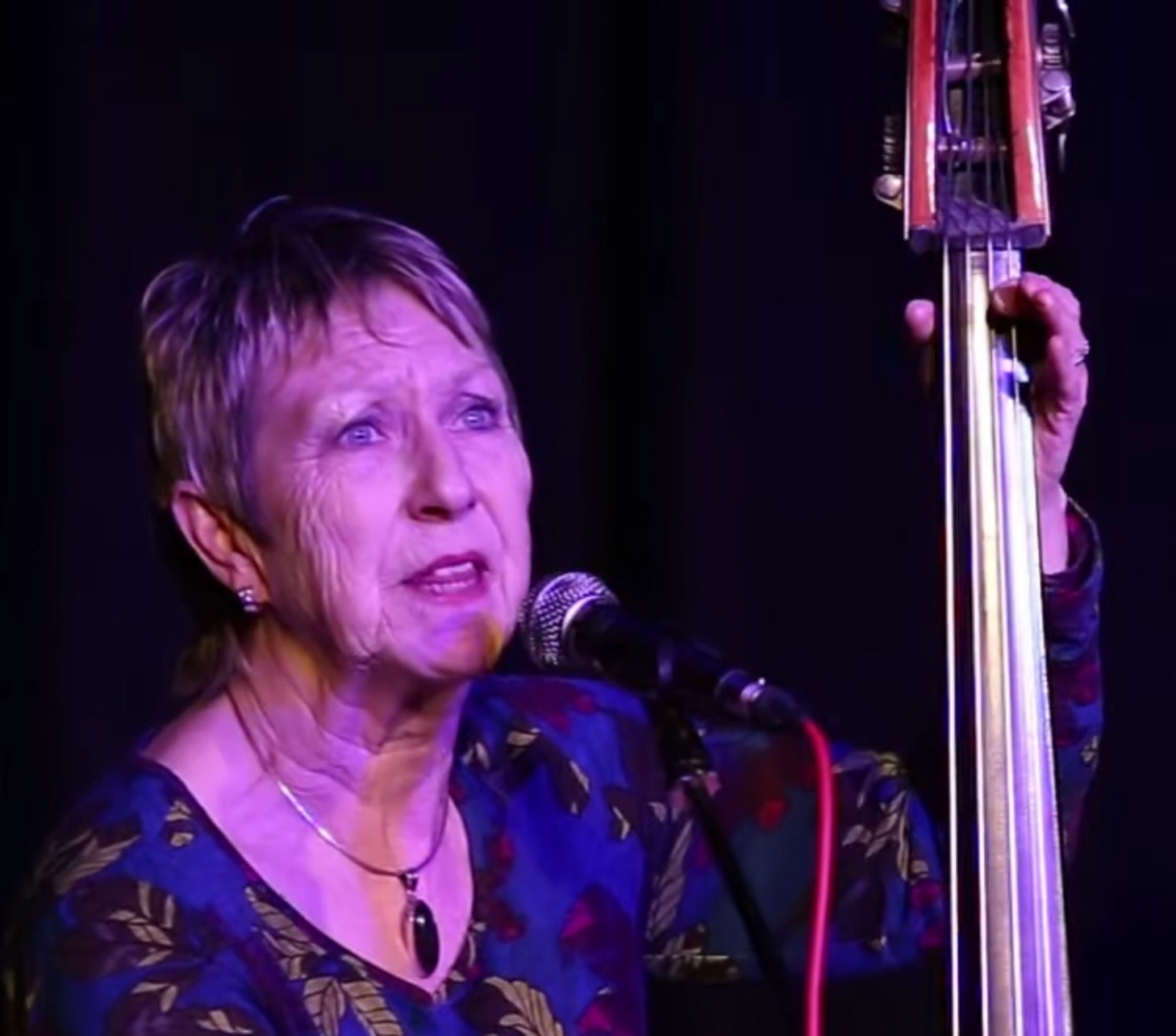
Hendy performing in 2018

Marlene Maska, formerly Marlene Hendy, is a Manx politician and musician. She was a member of the Legislative Council of the Isle of Man, being elected in March 2018 and serving a single term until 2023.

== Early life ==
Hendy grew up in south Ramsey.
