= Independent candidates in the 1993 Canadian federal election =

There were several independent candidates in the 1993 Canadian federal election, some of whom were associated with unregistered parties. One independent candidate, Gilles Bernier of Beauce, was elected. Information about other such candidates may be found here.

== Ontario ==
=== Nickel Belt: Ernie Ashick ===
Ernie Ashick identified as an auctioneer. He received 122 votes (0.27%), finishing seventh against Liberal candidate Ray Bonin.

=== Ottawa—Vanier: David Talbot ===
Talbot was a twenty-year-old university student at the time of the election. He served as a parliamentary page in 1992–1993, and chose to campaign for office after seeing parliamentarians vote the party line on issues they knew nothing about. He printed a number of t-shirts for the campaign, which read "Listen to the voice of youth" (Ottawa Citizen, 19 October 1993). Talbot received 445 votes (0.92%), finishing seventh against Liberal incumbent Jean-Robert Gauthier. He returned to his studies at the University of Ottawa after the campaign (Ottawa Citizen, 24 June 1994), and was an organizer for the Students' Federation of the University of Ottawa (SFUO) (Citizen, 22 November 1994).

Talbot subsequently joined the Progressive Conservative Party of Canada, and ran for the party's nomination for a 1995 by-election in Ottawa—Vanier. He lost to Francoise Guenette (Citizen, 15 February 1995). He later worked as a communications specialist for party leader Jean Charest (Citizen, 12 March 1998) and a press aide for Charest's interim successor, Elsie Wayne (Montreal Gazette, 8 August 1998).

=== Parry Sound-Muskoka: John Farr ===
John Farr is a paralegal and freelance title searcher based in Bracebridge, Ontario. He was once a lawyer based in Orillia, but was disbarred in 1982 after having been found to have misappropriated funds. He acknowledged his past in a 2010 municipal campaign, saying that these events occurred many years ago and had no bearing on his current activities.

Farr ran for the House of Commons of Canada as an independent candidate in 1993, for the mayoralty of Bracebridge in 1994, and for the Bracebridge town council in 2006 and 2010. On each occasion, he finished well behind the victorious candidate.

Electoral record
Election	Division	Party	Votes	%	Place	Winner
1993 federal	Parry Sound-Muskoka	Independent	181	0.39	7/8	Andy Mitchell, Liberal
1994 Bracebridge municipal	Mayor of Bracebridge	n/a	92	6/6	1.78	Russ Black
2006 Bracebridge municipal	Councillor, Muskoka North/Monck	n/a	185	10.53	4/4	Edith Nichols
2010 Bracebridge municipal	Councillor, Muskoka North/Monck	n/a	157	7.67	5/5	Mark Quemby

Sources: Thirty-fifth General Election, 1993: Official Voting Results, Published by the Chief Electoral Officer of Canada; Official results from 1994, 2006, and 2010, City of Bracebridge.

== Alberta ==
=== Calgary Southwest: Miel S.R. Gabriel ===
Gabriel is a civil engineer, and owned a catering business at the time of the election. He formed a group called "Canada in a New Century" in 1992 to oppose the Charlottetown Accord, and unsuccessfully sought the Reform Party nomination for Calgary Northeast in the same year. He was forty-four years old in 1993.

He campaigned for the Legislative Assembly of Alberta in the 1993 provincial election, running as an independent candidate against Premier Ralph Klein. His candidacy centred on a "contract" which he encouraged all MLAs to sign, promising cuts to government expenditures and to the salaries and pensions of elected officials. Signatories were also pledged to resign if they violated the terms of the agreement. It does not appear that any elected officials chose to sign the contract

Gabriel campaigned for the Calgary City Council later in 1993. He finished eighth out of nine candidates in Calgary Southwest in the 1993 federal election, losing to Reform Party leader Preston Manning.

He later challenged Al Duerr for Mayor of Calgary in 1995, promising to take a 50% pay cut in his first year and to encourage more popular participation in government. By this time, he had changed the name of his political advocacy organization to the Canada Modern Empire Strategic Institute. He refused to use campaign signs in this election, commenting "I'll have no election signs on the streets. Pollution is not part of my religion". He also called for the city to distribute money to companies on the condition that it be used to create jobs.

Electoral record
Election	Division	Party	Votes	%	Place	Winner
1993 provincial	Calgary-Elbow	Ind.	101		5/6	Ralph Klein, Progressive Conservative
Calgary municipal by-election, 20 September 1993	Council Ward 5	-	11		23/23	Ray Jones
1993 federal	Calgary Southwest	-	57	0.08	8/9	Preston Manning, Reform
1995 Calgary municipal	Mayor	-	1,137		5/7	Al Duerr

The 1993 municipal results are taken from the Calgary Herald, 21 September 1993, B1, and the 1995 results are taken from the Calgary Herald, 17 October 1995, A1. Italicized numbers are unofficial.

== Candidates in subsequent by-elections ==
=== Brome—Missisquoi, February 13, 1996: Yvon V. Boulanger ===
Yvon V. Boulanger identified as a manufacturer. He received 107 votes (0.29%), finishing seventh against Liberal Party candidate Denis Paradis. There was a Union Nationale candidate named Yvon Boulanger in the 1981 Quebec provincial election, but it is not clear if this was the same person.

=== Hamilton East, June 17, 1996: George Ambas ===
George Ambas was an entrepreneur in Hamilton. During the 1990s, he operated a footwear store on King Street East. He became politically active in 1995, after his brother Louis was killed by a seventeen-year-old offender at another of the family's stores in Toronto. He and a third brother, Tom Ambas, started a national petition calling for reforms to Canada's Young Offenders Act, such that youths accused of murder would be publicly identified and tried and sentenced as adults.

In 1996, Ambas ran as an independent candidate against prominent national politician Sheila Copps in a Hamilton East by-election. His campaign was centered on the Young Offenders Act. He was quoted as saying, "I am not a heartless human being — I am all for extra spending on prevention and everything that goes with that. But I'm also for real punishment for those few who rape, murder and commit armed robbery." Ambas also indicated that he never contemplated running for public office before his brother's death and had always voted for the Liberal Party.

He received 160 votes (0.60%), finishing sixth in a field of thirteen candidates, and returned to private life after this time. His brother Tom later ran in Scarborough Southwest as a Reform Party candidate.
