= John Quinn (advocate) =

British legal adviser (1954–2022)

- Born: 9 May 1954
- Died: 2 January 2022 (aged 67)

John Louie Marie Quinn QC (9 May 1954 – 2 January 2022) was the Attorney General of the Isle of Man. He was appointed to that office in 2017, having filled the role in an acting capacity since 2013. In 2013, he was also appointed (ex officio) as a member of the Legislative Council of the Isle of Man. Quinn was born on 9 May 1954. He was educated in Lancashire and Cheshire, and was married with seven children. Quinn died on 2 January 2022, at the age of 67.
