= Legislative Buildings, Douglas =

Parliamentary building in Douglas, Isle of Man

Legislative Buildings
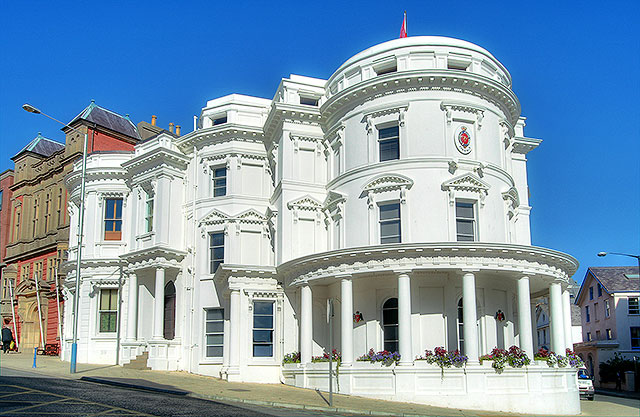
- The complex in September 2007

- Shown in Isle of Man
- 54.1509°N 4.4816°W
- Location: Finch Road, Douglas

History
- Built: 1855

Site notes
- Architect: John Robinson
- Architectural style: Neoclassical style

The Legislative Buildings (Manx: Troggalyn Slattyssagh) are the meeting place of the Tynwald, the legislative body for the Isle of Man. Based on Finch Road in Douglas, the complex was added to the protected buildings register in September 2025.

== History ==
The Tynwald's lower house, the 24 Keys, met irregularly at Castle Rushen in the Isle of Man's historic capital, Castletown, from the 16th century. It relocated to the Bishop Thomas Wilson's library in Castletown in 1710 but, after the library became dilapidated, the lower house, by then known as the House of Keys, moved to a dedicated building on what became known as Parliament Square in Castletown in 1821.

In 1860, the new lieutenant governor, Francis Pigott Stainsby Conant, decided to establish his home at Villa Marina in Douglas. Douglas was rapidly becoming the economic centre of the island and, after meeting in Castletown for the last time in 1861, the House of Keys relocated to the courthouse on Atholl Street in Douglas.

In the late-1870s, the House of Keys decided to acquire a dedicated building in Douglas for their meetings. The building they selected was the Bank of Mona Building at the corner of Bucks Road and Finch Road. The former banking hall had been commissioned by the City of Glasgow Bank, for its subsidiary, the Bank of Mona. The building was designed by John Robinson in the neoclassical style, built in brick with a whitewash finish and was completed in 1855. It featured a four-storey semi-circular section, in the style of a wedding cake, at the corner of the two streets. The ground floor was arcaded with a series of Doric order columns supporting a curved entablature and a modillioned cornice. The first floor was fenestrated by a series of sash windows with alternating triangular and segmental pediments, while the second floor was fenestrated by sash windows with cornices, and there were small rectangular windows at attic level. After the collapse of the City of Glasgow Bank in October 1878, the building became vacant and it was acquired by the Tynwald in December 1879. Internally, the chamber for the House of Keys was established in the former banking hall on the ground floor, while the legislative council, which acted as a revising chamber, was installed in a room on the first floor.

The Tynwald went on to commission a new building on a site immediately to the northwest of the original building. It was designed by James Cowle in the neoclassical style, built in red brick and was completed in 1894. It featured an ornate stone doorway surmounted by a pediment displaying the arms of the Kings of Mann and flanked by a pair of tall oriel windows. The first floor was fenestrated by three mullioned and transomed windows with cusped heads and there was a stone parapet above. Internally, the new rooms created included a courtroom and a robing room for the speaker of the House of Keys. Another much larger extension, designed in the modern style and built in brown brick, was added further to the northwest in the 1970s.
