= President of Tynwald =

Presiding officer of Isle of Man parliament

- Eaghtyrane Tinvaal
- Incumbent; Juan Watterson since 21 July 2026
- Style: Mr President
- Member of: Legislative Council of the Isle of Man
- Seat: Legislative Buildings, Douglas, Isle of Man
- Nominator: Members of Tynwald
- Appointer: Members of Tynwald
- Term length: 5 years; No restriction on renewal
- Constituting instrument: Constitution Act 1990
- Precursor: Lieutenant Governor of the Isle of Man
- Formation: 1990
- First holder: Sir Charles Kerruish
- Deputy: Speaker of the House of Keys
- Salary: £73,342
- Website: https://www.tynwald.org.im/memoff/preside

The President of Tynwald (Eaghtyrane Tinvaal) is the presiding officer at the sittings of Tynwald Court in Douglas and is elected by the members of Tynwald from amongst their number. The first elected president, Charles Kerruish, was elected in 1990 and held office until his retirement in 2000.

The presiding officer remains impartial but, in the case of a tied vote in the Legislative Council on a division, has a casting vote. The President authorises the Order Paper for sittings, is responsible for controlling the procedure of Tynwald Court and for the authoritative interpretation of its Standing Orders. This is mostly mirrored in the office of the Speaker of the House of Keys.

Prior to 1990, the post was held ex officio by the Lieutenant Governor. The office is now held jointly with the Presidency of the Legislative Council (Eaghtyrane y Choonseil Slattyssagh).

== Dress ==
At ceremonial occasions, such as the annual Tynwald Day ceremony or the proclamation of a new Lord of Mann, the president wears a full-bottomed wig and a blue damask cloak decorated with silver thread and Manx motifs. This cloak was designed by Charles Kerruish and draws inspiration from the carpet of the Tynwald Chamber. For other occasions, such as presiding over Tynwald during sittings for normal business, the presidential dress is the full-bottomed wig and a black cloak, akin to that worn by the Speaker of the House of Keys during sittings of the House.

== List of presidents of Tynwald ==
- ex officio the Lieutenant Governor, until 1990
- Charles Kerruish, 1990–2000
- Noel Quayle Cringle, 2000–2011
- Clare Christian, 2011–2016
- Stephen Rodan, 2016–2021
- Laurence Skelly, 2021–2026
- Juan Watterson, 2026–

Kerruish, Cringle, Rodan and Watterson had all served as Speaker of the House of Keys before assuming the Presidency. Christian is Kerruish's daughter.

== Deputy presidents of Tynwald ==
The Deputy President is generally the same as the Speaker of the House of Keys; consequently, the current Deputy President is vacant.
