= Alan Shea =

Manx gay rights activist

External image
- Shea's Tynwald petition in 1991

Alan Shea (born 1958) is a Manx gay rights campaigner. He is known for publicly presenting a petition of grievance on Tynwald Day in 1991 to decriminalise homosexuality.

== Activism ==
Shea's activism began in the 1980s in response to a suicide by a young man who had been arrested in a public toilet. Shea reported a climate of fear at the time from the police, who raided and monitored his house. In addition to suicides, he knew many members of the LGBT+ community who fled the island. Shea contacted the British pressure group OutRage! for support.

On 5 July 1991, Shea showed up at Tynwald Day in St John's to present a petition of grievance to decriminalise homosexuality. This action was supported by OutRage and the Ellan Vannin Gay Group, who brought placards and literature and filmed the event. Shea wore makeshift striped pajamas with a pink triangle, which he had "tested" earlier at London Pride and added the Manx triskele, to evoke the persecution of homosexuals by Nazi Germany and expose the Isle of Man's status as the only Western European territory at the time to still persecute homosexuality. Shea faced fierce opposition on and in response to that day.

The start of progress began in 1992 with the Sexual Offences Act, which partially decriminalised homosexuality by setting the age of consent to 21 but introduced Section 38 prohibiting "promotion of homosexuality" by public bodies. The Act was amended in 2002 and 2006 to equalise the age of consent with heterosexual acts and repeal Section 38.

In 2020, Howard Quayle issued an apology for to gay men convicted of same-sex offences under previous Manx laws. In 2022, the Isle of Man police commissioner also formally apologised for historic enforcement of anti-gay laws. Shea said the apology was "needed" not just for himself but for the families who "have lost their children" in similar instances to the suicide that spurred Shea into action.

== Personal life ==
Shea entered a civil partnership with his longterm partner Stephen Moore in 2012. After the Isle of Man legalised gay marriage in 2016, they converted their partnership into marriage. The couple live in Douglas.

== In media ==
In 2021 and 2022, Manx National Heritage displayed the pajamas Shea wore at the Manx Museum. He was the subject of poetry in Simon Maddrell's pamphlet Isle of Sin.

Shea featured in John Craine's verbatim documentary for The Guardian titled No Man is an Island (2025). The film charts the 1990s fight for gay rights in the Isle of Man.
