= Tony Wild =

Manx politician (died 2019)

Tony Wild (born in Newcastle-upon-Tyne) was (until March 2017) a Member of the Legislative Council, and thus also of Tynwald Court, in the Isle of Man. He used to be Island Director of Lloyds Banking Group.

He was also an associate member of the Chartered Institute of Bankers, member of the Institute of Directors and former president of the Isle of Man Bankers’ Association and worked in international banking in the Isle of Man and the UK, principally with the Lloyds Banking Group.

On February 28, 2017, his resignation from the council was formally announced during a council meeting.

In November 2019, Wild died at the age of 61.
