= Norman Radcliffe =

Manx politician

John Norman Radcliffe was a former member of the Legislative Council of the Isle of Man.

He was born in 1931, and educated at Ramsey Grammar School; he then became a farmer before being both a member, and the Chairman of the Andreas Parish Commissioners. For a long time, he worked for the MER (Manx Electric Railway) and was Station Master at Ramsey.

In 1976, he was elected as Member of the House of Keys for Ayre (with the slogan A.Y.R.E. - All Year Round Effort), and in 1985, he was elevated to the Legislative Council (LegCo). He also served as the Chairman (now Minister) of several Boards in the pre-Ministerial era. Just before he died, he was appointed as Captain of the Parish for Kirk Andreas. He died in 2002.

== Governmental positions ==
- Chairman of the Highway and Transport Board, 1979–1982
- Chairman of the Board of Agriculture and Fisheries, 1982–1986
- Chairman of the Insurance Authority, 1988-?
