= Clare Christian =

Manx politician (born 1945)

President of Tynwald
- In office 12 July 2011 – 19 July 2016
- Monarch: Elizabeth II
- Premier: Tony Brown; Allan Bell
- Governor: Adam Wood
- Preceded by: Noel Cringle
- Succeeded by: Steve Rodan

Personal details
- Born: 11 September 1945 (age 80) Isle of Man
- Party: Independent
- Spouse(s): Thomas Christian (m. 1974, div. 1977)
- Children: 1
- Profession: Politician

Clare Margaret Christian OBE CP (born 11 September 1945) is a Manx politician, who was President of Tynwald until 2016. She is a former member of the Legislative Council and former Health Minister in the Isle of Man Government.

Christian is the daughter of Sir Charles Kerruish, President of Tynwald and Chairman of the Executive Council. Her sister is Anne Craine, the former Treasury Minister. She is a graduate of the University of London with a degree in Physics and Chemistry, and previously worked as a research chemist for Cadbury Schweppes. She was also the Island Guide Commissioner from 1991 to 1996.

Christian became an MHK at her first attempt for the Ayre constituency in March 1980, but failed to be re-elected in 1986. She was, however, appointed an MLC in 1993 and was appointed Health Minister in 1996, overseeing the construction of the new Noble's Hospital. In 2011, she was elected to the position of President of Tynwald.

Christian was appointed an Officer of the Order of the British Empire (OBE) in the 2016 Birthday Honours for services to the Isle of Man.

She was appointed Captain of the Parish of Maughold in early 2018.

== Governmental positions ==
- Chairman of the Civil Service Commission, 1981–82
- Minister of Health and Social Security, 1996–2004
- Vice Chairman of Isle of Man Water and Sewerage Authority, 2009–11
- President of Tynwald, 2011–16
