= Tanya August-Phillips =

Manx politician

Member of the Legislative Council of the Isle of Man

Personal details
- Education: University of Central Lancashire; McGill University

Tanya August-Phillips, previously Tanya August-Hanson, and earlier Tanya Humbles, is a member of the Legislative Council of the Isle of Man, having been elected in March 2018.

== Early life and education ==
August-Phillips graduated with a Bachelor of Arts (BA) in Public Relations in 2009 and a Master of Arts (MA) in International Journalism in 2010, both from the University of Central Lancashire. She later pursued a Post-graduate certificate at McGill University and a Master of Laws (LLM) at a university in London.

== Parliamentary career ==
In 2023, August-Phillips introduced Lawrie Hooper's Private Member's Bill to the Legislative Council. The Isle Of Man Constitution Bill 2023 aimed to ensure only elected members could vote in the Tynwald, thereby removing the ex officio vote of the Bishop of Sodor and Man; it is set to go back before the House of Keys in late 2025.
