= Steve Rodan =

Manx politician

The Honourable Steve Rodan OBE MLC

President of Tynwald
- In office 19 July 2016 – 20 July 2021
- Monarch: Elizabeth II
- Lieutenant Governor: Richard Gozney
- Preceded by: Clare Christian
- Succeeded by: Laurence Skelly

Speaker of the House of Keys
- In office 16 December 2006 – 18 July 2016
- Preceded by: Tony Brown
- Succeeded by: Juan Watterson

Minister of Health and Social Security
- In office 30 June 2004 – 15 December 2006
- Preceded by: Edgar Mann
- Succeeded by: David Anderson

Minister of Education
- In office 12 May 1999 – 30 June 2004
- Preceded by: Clare Christian
- Succeeded by: Eddie Teare

Member of the House of Keys for Garff
- In office 4 May 1995 – 19 July 2016
- Preceded by: Edgar Mann
- Succeeded by: Daphne Caine and Martin Perkins

Personal details
- Born: 19 April 1954 (age 71) Glasgow, Scotland, UK
- Party: Independent
- Other political affiliations: Liberal
- Spouse: Ana Torres (m. 1977)
- Children: 2 daughters
- Profession: Politician

Stephen Charles Rodan OBE MLC (born 19 April 1954) is a Manx politician who served as the President of Tynwald from 2016 to 2021 and is a former Minister of the Isle of Man Government and former MHK for the constituency of Garff. He was first elected to the seat in a by-election in 1995.

He has been Isle of Man County Chairman of the Royal British Legion since 2012.

== Early life and career ==
Born on 19 April 1954 in Glasgow to Robert W. Rodan and Betty Rodan (née Turner), he is a qualified pharmacist.

Rodan was educated at the High School of Glasgow and the University of Edinburgh, before graduating from Heriot-Watt University, Edinburgh, with a BSc (Hons) in pharmacy.

After graduating, in 1978, Rodan began practising as a pharmacist in Elgin, Morayshire. In 1980, he moved to Bermuda and worked as a pharmacy manager until moving to the Isle of Man.

Since 1987 Rodan has resided in Laxey, the most populated village in Garff, where he is the proprietor of a pharmacy. Politically he is a liberal, having chaired both the Heriot-Watt University Liberal Club and Scottish Young Liberals. He was also a Member of the National Executive of the Scottish Liberal Party. He stood for the House of Commons in 1979 in the constituency of Moray and Nairn, but was defeated by the Conservative Alexander Pollock.

Rodan was first elected as Member of the House of Keys for Garff in 1995, and re-elected in 1996, 2001, 2006, and 2011.

In 2006, Rodan, then Minister of Health and Social Security, was instrumental in enfranchising 16 and 17 year olds when he moved a successful amendment to Clause 3 of the Registration of Electors Bill, a piece of legislation intended to provide for the rolling registration of electors, resulting in the lowering of the voting age.

Rodan stood for Chief Minister of the Isle of Man following the November 2006 elections, but failed to gain the necessary support in round one. He then stood for Speaker and defeated David Cannan and Quintin Gill.

Rodan was elected as President of Tynwald on 19 June 2016 for a period of five years. Rodan presided over his final Tynwald Day on 5 July 2021, prior to standing down from the post. He was replaced as President of Tynwald by Laurence Skelly.

Rodan was appointed Officer of the Order of the British Empire (OBE) in the 2019 Birthday Honours for services to the Isle of Man.

== Personal life ==
Rodan has been married to Ana (née Ballesteros Torres) since 1977; they have two children together.

== Government positions ==
- President of Tynwald, 2016–2021
- Member of the House of Keys, 1995–2016
- Minister of Education, 1999–2004
- Minister of Health and Social Security, 2004–2006
- Speaker of the House of Keys, 2006–2016
- Deputy President of Tynwald, 2007-2016
- Member of the Tynwald Standards and Members' Interests Committee, 2006–present
- Member of the Tynwald Ceremony Arrangements Committee, 2006–present (Chairman (eo) 2016-present)
- Chairman of the Standing Orders Committee of the Legislative Council, 2016–present
- Member of the Tynwald Setting Enhancement Sub-Committee, 2006–present
- Member of the Tynwald Standing Orders Committee, 2006–present
- Member of the Tynwald Honours Committee, 2006–present
- Member of the Tynwald Management Committee, 2006–present
- Trustee of the Manx National Heritage, 2006–2012
- Court of Liverpool University (eo), 2007-2014
- Tynwald Representative on the British-Irish Parliamentary Assembly, 2007-2016
- Chairman of the Estates and Housing Division, 1995-1996
- Chairman of the Planning Committee, 1997-1999
- Chairman of the Emoluments Committee (eo), 2006-2016
- Chairman of the Tynwald Standards and Members' Interests Committee (eo), 2006-2016
- Chairman of the Tynwald Management Committee (eo), 2006-2016
- Chairman of the House of Keys Management and Members' Standards Committee (eo), 2006-2016
- Chairman of the Standing Orders Committee of the House of Keys (eo), 2006-2016

== Other posts ==
- Royal Pharmaceutical Society of Great Britain, National Executive, 1978
- Scottish Liberal Party, 1975-1977
- Bermuda Pipe Band, 1980-1987
- Laxey Village Commissioners, 1991-1995 (Chairman 1993-1995)
- Laxey Traders' Association, Chairman 1990-1993
- UN Association (Isle of Man Branch), 2002–present
- Ellan Vannin Pipes and Drums, 2007–present
- Edinburgh University Liberal Club, Chairman 1974-1976
- Heriot-Watt University Liberal Club, Chairman 1976-1977
- Scottish Young Liberals, Chairman 1974-1976
- Cair Vie Manx Pipe Band, Chairman and Pipe Major 1992-1995
- Laxey and Lonan Heritage Trust, Chairman 1995–2014, Trustee and Director 1998-2014
- Laxey Fair Committee, Chairman 2009–present
- Caledonian Society of Bermuda, President 1983-1985
- Royal British Legion, Lonan and Laxey Branch President 1998–present, Isle of Man County President 2012–present
- Groudle Glen Railway, President 2015–present
- Manx Chemists' Association, Treasurer 1989-1995
- Great Laxey Mines Railway Ltd, Trustee and Director 2002-2014
- Laxey Working Men's Institute, Trustee and Director 1998-2005

== Publications ==
- Voting at 16 in the Isle of Man, The Parliamentarian Magazine, 2007/Issue 2
- Self-assessment in the Isle of Man, The Parliamentarian Magazine, 2012/Issue 1
