= John Crellin =

John Frissell Crellin MC and Bar JP CP (22 November 1889 – 26 March 1981) was a Manx politician who was a prominent Member of the House of Keys in the Isle of Man.

He was born in Douglas in 1889, the son of John Christian Crellin MHK JP CP and Sophia Harriett Anderson. He was educated at King William's College and served in the First World War in France and was wounded in 1916, awarded the Military Cross with bar in 1918.

He was appointed Captain of the Parish of Andreas in 1918 and elected to the House of Keys as a Member for Ayre at the 1924 General Election. Then in 1929 he swapped to Michael, the constituency for which his father and his grandfather sat. He went on to be Chairman of the Local Government Board and of the Fisheries Board as well as a Church Commissioner and a Director of the Isle of Man Steam Packet Company.
