= Legislative Council of the Isle of Man =

Upper house of the parliament of the Isle of Man

Coordinates: 54°09′03″N 4°28′56″W

Legislative Council Yn Choonceil Slattyssagh

Type
- Type: Upper house of the Tynwald

Leadership
- President: Juan Watterson since 21 July 2026

Structure
- Seats: 11
- Political groups: Independent (8); Ex officio (3)

Elections
- Voting system: Indirect election by the House of Keys

Meeting place
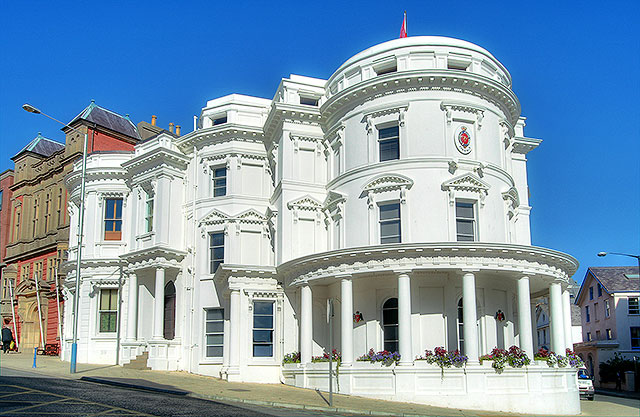
- Chamber of the Legislative Council, Legislative Buildings, Douglas

Website
- www.tynwald.org.im/council

The Legislative Council (Manx: Yn Choonceil Slattyssagh) is the upper chamber of Tynwald, the legislature of the Isle of Man. The abbreviation "LegCo" is often used.

== Composition ==
It consists of eleven members (MLCs):

- Eight members elected by the House of Keys
- Three ex officio members:
  - President of Tynwald, ex officio President of the Legislative Council (casting vote)
  - Bishop of Sodor and Man
  - Attorney General for the Isle of Man (non-voting)

Historically, most or all elected MLCs were former MHKs, but this practice has now much reduced or ceased.

Formerly, the Lieutenant Governor presided over the Legislative Council and over Tynwald Court (a joint session of the Council and the House of Keys). Now, however, the President of Tynwald, who is chosen by the whole Tynwald for a five-year term, is the ex officio President of the Legislative Council, and presides over both the Legislative Council and Tynwald Court, except that the Lieutenant Governor presides once a year on Tynwald Day.

Furthermore, the Church of England Bishop of Sodor and Man and the Attorney General have seats on the Legislative Council. The Bishop is a voting member, the Attorney General is a non-voting member, and the President has the casting vote.

The Council does not usually originate legislation; most of the time, it reviews draft legislation originating in the House of Keys. However, it is possible for legislation to originate in the Council: a recent example is the Equality Act 2017.

The council meets in the Chamber of the Legislative Council, Legislative Buildings in Douglas.

== Method of election ==
The MLCs are elected by the members of the House of Keys for a term of five years. Four MLCs retire at a time, and four new MLCs are then elected. An MLC must be at least 21 years old and resident in the Isle of Man. Historically the election procedure has been cumbersome, and on some occasions in recent years the election has required many ballots, stretching over a period of weeks or even months. However the Standing Orders of the House of Keys regarding the election of MLCs were amended on 4 April 2017, and a relevant Guidance Note was issued by the Speaker of the House of Keys in June 2017. In 2018, only one ballot was required, although some felt that that was at the cost of allowing members to vote for an excessive number of candidates (one member voted for 13 candidates out of 15 and another for 11).

A motion was proposed in the Keys on 28 January 2020, shortly before the 2020 MLC election, which would have prevented MHKs voting for more candidates than there are places to be filled, but this was rejected.

In 2020, again only one ballot was required, and members voted for an average of about 4 candidates each. In 2023, again only one ballot was required, and members voted for an average of about 5 candidates each.

== 2016 Review of the Functioning of Tynwald ==
For many years there has been considerable debate about the functioning of Tynwald, and specifically about the composition, method of election, and functions of the Legislative Council. In the past, a number of reforms were made in the composition of the Legislative Council, which are set out below. In 2016 Lord Lisvane was asked to carry out a review of the functioning of Tynwald. Among his recommendations were:

- Members of the Legislative Council should continue not to be directly elected, but instead should be nominated by an independent Nominations Commission to the House of Keys. No sitting MHK could be nominated.
- The Legislative Council should not vote on taxation or appropriation.
- Only exceptionally should MLCs be ministers.
- The Bishop should continue as an ex officio voting member of the Legislative Council.

However there has been little action to implement these recommendations.

== 1990 reform and current composition ==
The Lieutenant Governor was removed as Presiding Officer of Tynwald and replaced by a member of Tynwald elected by the Members of the High Court of Tynwald as President of Tynwald. (Currently only MHKs are electors.) The President of Tynwald is also a member of the Legislative Council and presides at its sittings. The members are thus:

- President of Tynwald
- Attorney General
- Bishop of Sodor and Man
- Eight members elected by the House of Keys

The non-ex officio members are elected by the House of Keys for terms which end at the end of February immediately before the fifth anniversary of their election.

== Current membership ==
Name	Position	Tenure	Predecessor
Juan Watterson	President of Tynwald	2026–present	Laurence Skelly
Tricia Hillas	Bishop of Sodor and Man	Since 2024	Peter Eagles
Walter Wannenburgh	Attorney-General	Since 2022	John Quinn
Tanya August-Phillips (Note: Elected under the name of Tanya Humbles.)	Elected members	2018–2028	—N/a
Paul Craine	Elected members	2021–2028	—N/a
Diane Kelsey	Elected members	2021–2028	—N/a
Rob Mercer	Elected members	2020-2030	—N/a
Peter Reid	Elected members	2025-2030	—N/a
Gary Clueit	Elected members	2025-2030	—N/a
Kirstie Morphet	Elected members	2025-2030	—N/a
Dawn Kinnish	Elected members	2023–2028	—N/a

== Membership of the council since 1990 ==
Year	Reason for change	Previous	Candidates
4 March 2025	Scheduled election	Robert Mercer; Bill Henderson; Peter Greenhill; Kerry Sharpe	Robert Mercer (elected); Peter Reid (elected); Gary Clueit (elected); Kirstie Morphet (elected); Julia Bell; Ronald Berry; Barry Carbis; Mark Cleator; Barry Duncan; Matthew Gough; Bill Henderson; Andrew Jones; Clair Newall; Martyn Perkins; Kerry Sharpe
14 March 2023	Scheduled election	Tanya August-Phillips; Paul Craine; Diane Kelsey; Marlene Maska	Tanya August-Phillips (elected); Paul Craine (elected); Diane Kelsey (elected); Dawn Kinnish (elected); Marie Birtles; Brian Brumby; Gary Clueit; Kirrie Anne Jenkins; Conor Keenan; David Prictor; Peter Reid
January 2022	Death of John Quinn		
23 November 2021	Election of two MLCs as MHKs	Jane Poole-Wilson; Kate Lord-Brennan	Paul Craine (elected); Diane Kelsey (elected); Bill Shimmins; Corelli Bentham; Craig Brown; MaryBeth Coll; Conor Keenan
In 2021 Steve Rodan reached the end of his term as President and was replaced by Laurence Skelly.
12 March 2020	Scheduled election	David Cretney; Tim Crookall; Bill Henderson; Kerry Sharpe	Peter Greenhill (elected); Bill Henderson (elected); Robert Mercer (elected); Kerry Sharpe (elected)
12 March 2020	Scheduled election	David Cretney; Tim Crookall; Bill Henderson; Kerry Sharpe	Danielle Bell; Michelle Haywood; Haafizah Hoosen; Carole Lillywhite; Zahed Miah
12 March 2018	Scheduled election, and casual vacancy by resignation	Michael Coleman; Geoff Corkish; Jane Poole-Wilson; Juan Turner	Tanya Humbles (now Tanya August-Phillips)(elected); Marlene Hendy (now Marlene Maska)(elected); Kate Lord-Brennan (elected); Jane Poole-Wilson (elected)
12 March 2018	Scheduled election, and casual vacancy by resignation	David Anderson (resigned, term ending Feb 2020)	Kerry Sharpe (elected)
12 March 2018	Scheduled election, and casual vacancy by resignation		Kevin Cartledge; Shirley Ellen Corlett; Andrea Chambers; Richard Furner; Andrew Hardy; Juan Kelly; Dawn Joughin; Alistair Ramsay; John Skinner; Christine Wheeler
2017	Casual vacancy by resignation	Tony Wild	Jane Poole-Wilson (elected)
2017	Casual vacancy by resignation		Paul Beckett; Alan Wright
2015	Scheduled election	Phil Braidwood; Dudley Butt; Alan Crowe; Alex Downie	David Anderson (elected); David Cretney (elected); Tim Crookall (elected); Bill Henderson (elected)
2015	Scheduled election		Paul Beckett; Phil Braidwood; Christopher Kinley; Thomas Moyle; Adrian Tinkler
2015	Note: As on other occasions, the 2015 elections took place over several sessions and many ballots. These candidates did not all take part in all the ballots. For the same reason it would not be useful to give the number of votes cast for each candidate.		
2013	Scheduled election	David Callister; Edmund Lowey; Juan Turner; Tony Wild	Michael Coleman (elected); Geoff Corkish (elected); Juan Turner (elected); Tony Wild (elected)
2013	Scheduled election		Linda Bowers-Kasch; Peter Hill; Nigel Malpass
2011	Casual vacancy by elevation to President of Tynwald	Clare Christian	Tony Wild, 16 votes (elected)
2011	Casual vacancy by elevation to President of Tynwald		Brian Rae, 5 votes
2011	Casual vacancy by resignation	Noel Cringle	Clare Christian (elected)
2011	Casual vacancy by resignation		Tony Brown; Steve Rodan
2011	Appointment of Attorney General, following resignation	John Corlett QC	Stephen Harding QC
2010	Scheduled election	Alan Crowe; Dudley Butt; Alex Downie; George Waft	Phil Braidwood (elected); Dudley Butt (elected); Alan Crowe (elected); Alex Downie (elected)
2010	Scheduled election		Barbara Brereton; Brenda Cannell; John Skinner; David Talbot; George Waft; Kevin Woodford
2008	Scheduled election	Clare Christian; Pamela Crowe; Edmund Lowey; Juan Turner	David Callister (elected); Clare Christian (elected); Edmund Lowey (elected); Juan Turner (elected)
2008	Scheduled election		Pamela Crowe; Simon Graley; Dick Horsnell
2008	Appointment of Bishop of Sodor and Man	Graeme Paul Knowles	Robert Paterson
2007	Casual vacancies by resignation	Donald Gelling; Leonard Singer	Alan Crowe (elected); Juan Turner (elected)
2007	Casual vacancies by resignation		Charles Cain; Peter Kelly; John Lightfoot; David Moore; David Owens; Richard Radcliffe; Leonard Singer
2005	Scheduled election	Dominic Delaney; Donald Gelling; Ray Kniveton; George Waft	Dudley Butt (elected); Alex Downie (elected); Donald Gelling (elected); George Waft (elected)
2005	Scheduled election		Dominic Delaney; Howard Parkin
2003	Scheduled election, and casual vacancy by resignation	Clare Christian; Alan Crowe; Ray Kniveton; Edmund Lowey	Clare Christian (elected); Pamela Crowe (elected); Edmund Lowey (elected); Leonard Singer (elected)
2003	Scheduled election, and casual vacancy by resignation	Edgar Mann (resigned)	Ray Kniveton (elected)
2003	Scheduled election, and casual vacancy by resignation		St John Bates; Andrew Roy; Roger Watterson
2003	Appointment of Bishop of Sodor and Man, following resignation	Noël Jones	Graeme Knowles
2002	Casual vacancy by death	Norman Radcliffe	Donald Gelling (elected)
2000	Scheduled election	Dominic Delaney; Edgar Mann; Norman Radcliffe; George Waft	Dominic Delaney (elected); Edgar Mann (elected); Norman Radcliffe (elected); George Waft (elected)
2000	Scheduled election		David North
2000	Casual vacancy by resignation of the President of Tynwald	Charles Kerruish	Noel Cringle (elected)
1998	Appointment of Attorney General, following promotion to First Deemster	Mike Kerruish QC	John Corlett QC
1998	Scheduled election	Brian Barton; Clare Christian; Edmund Lowey; Arthur Luft	Clare Christian (elected); Alan Crowe (elected); Ray Kniveton (elected); Edmund Lowey (elected)
1998	Scheduled election		Charles Cain; Andrew Douglas; Adrian Duggan; Robert Quayle; Richard Radcliffe
1995	Scheduled election	Arnold Callin; Edward Clifford Irving; Norman Radcliffe; George Waft	Dominic Delaney (elected); Edgar Mann (elected); Norman Radcliffe (elected); George Waft (elected)
1995	Scheduled election		Other nominations unknown
1994	Casual vacancy by death	W K Quirk	George Waft (elected)
1994	Casual vacancy by death		Other nominations unknown
1993	Scheduled election	Ian Anderson; Brian Barton; Edmund Lowey; Arthur Luft	Brian Barton, 15 votes (elected); Clare Christian, 17 votes (elected); Edmund Lowey, 14 votes (elected); Arthur Luft, 16 votes (elected)
1993	Scheduled election		Norman Butler, 7 votes; J A S Christian, 8 votes; Charles Cain, 6 votes; R B M Quayle, 8 votes; R Rawcliffe, 5 votes
1990	Scheduled election	Mr Callin; Mr Irving; Mr Quirk; Mr Radcliffe	Arnold Callin (elected); Edward Clifford Irving (elected); Norman Radcliffe (elected); W K Quirk (elected)
1990	Scheduled election		John Callister Clucas; Dominic Delaney; A C Duggan; David Moore

== Past membership ==
Name	Position	Tenure	Replacing
Robert Paterson	Bishop of Sodor and Man	2008–2016	Graeme Paul Knowles
Stephen Harding QC	Attorney General	2011–2013	John Corlett
Alan Crowe	Elected member	1998–2002	Brian Barton
Alan Crowe	Elected member	2007–2015	Leonard Singer
Dudley Butt	Elected member	2005–2015	Dominic Delaney
Alex Downie	Elected member	2005–2015	Ray Kniveton
Phil Braidwood	Elected member	2010–2015	George Waft
Tony Wild	Elected member	2011–2017	Clare Christian
David Callister	Elected member	2008–2013	Pam Crowe
Edmund Lowey	Elected member	1982–2013	George Swales
Leonard Singer	Elected member	2003–2006	Alan Crowe
Arthur Christian Luft	Attorney General	1972–1974	Lay
Arthur Christian Luft	Elected member	1988–1998	Ian Anderson
John William Corrin	Attorney General	1974–1980	Arthur Luft
Thomas William Cain QC	Attorney General	1980–1993	Jack Corrin
Michael Kerruish QC	Attorney General	1993–1998	William Cain
John Corlett QC	Attorney General	1998–2011	Michael Kerruish
Graeme Knowles	Bishop of Sodor and Man	2003–2008	Noël Jones
Donald Gelling	Elected member	2002–2007	Norman Radcliffe
Clifford Irving	Elected member	1987–1995	Matty Ward
Noel Cringle	President of Tynwald	2000–2011	Sir Charles Kerruish
Sir Charles Kerruish	President of Tynwald	1990–2000	Ian Anderson
Ian Anderson	Elected member	1982–1988	Geoff Crellin
Ian Anderson	President of the Legislative Council	1988–1990	Jack Nivison
Ian Anderson	Elected member	1990–1993	New position, 8th elected member
Jack Nivison	Elected member	1962–1980	Alfred Teare
Jack Nivison	President of the Legislative Council	1980–1988	New position
The Venerable J. Kewley	Archdeacon	1912–1919	Unknown
Cyril Hughes-Games	Vicar General	1906–1919	Unknown
Joseph Qualtrough	Elected member	1919–1933	New position
Joseph Cunningham	Elected member	1919–1924	New position
R C Cain	Elected member	1919–1924	Joseph Cunningham
John Robert Kerruish	Elected member	1919–1924	New position
William Southward	Elected member	1919–1943	New position
George Drinkwater	Appointee of Lieutenant Governor	1919–1920	New position
Richard Barton Quirk	Appointee of Lieutenant Governor	1919–1942	New position
Sir John Bolton	Appointed member	1962–1970	John Crellin
Sir John Bolton	Elected member	1971–1979	Henry Nicholls
G C Gale	Elected member	1964–1966	Ewan Farrant
Ffinlo Corkill	Elected member	1966–1974	G C Gale
Major Geoffrey Crellin	Elected member	1975–1982	New position
Norman Crowe OBE JP	Elected member	1970–1978	Cecil McFee
Captain John Crellin OBE MC JP	Appointed member	1943–1962	Daniel Teare
Betty Hanson	Elected member	1982–1988	Alfred Simcocks MBE
Robert Kerruish	Elected member	1970–1985	Unknown
Victor Kneale	Elected member	1974–1981	Hubert Radcliffe
Roy MacDonald	Elected member	1978–1985	Norman Crowe
Cecil McFee	Unknown	1962–1971	Unknown
Alec Moore	Elected member	1979–1985	William E Quayle
Henry Nicholls	Elected member	1958–1970	Joseph Callister
William E Quayle	Elected member	1970–1978	New position
Willy Quirk	Elected member	1987–1993	Dr Edgar Mann
Norman Radcliffe	Elected member	1985–2002	Roy MacDonald
Percy Radcliffe	Elected member	1980–1985	Sir John Bolton
Alfred Simcocks MBE	Elected member	1974–1982	Ffinlo Corkhill
George Swales	Elected member	1982–1982	Victor Kneale
Matthew Ward	Elected member	1985–1987	Alec Moore
Arthur Attwell	Bishop of Sodor and Man	1983–1988	Vernon Nicholls
Noël Jones	Bishop of Sodor and Man	1989–2003	Arthur Attwell
Vernon Nicholls	Bishop of Sodor and Man	1973–1983	Unknown
George Moore	First Deemster	1969–1974	Unknown
Sir Ralph Stevenson GCMG CP JP	Appointed member	1955–1970	Unknown
William Watson Christian	Unknown	1848–1867	Unknown
The Rev. William Christian	Unknown	1883–1887	Unknown
William Quirk	Unknown	1887–1893	Unknown
William Anderson	Receiver General	1894–1909	Unknown
John Cowell	Receiver General	1909–1919	William Anderson
John Goldie-Taubman	Appointed member	1921–1924	George Drinkwater
Edward Callister	Elected member	1921–1931	John Robert Kerruish
John Clucas	Appointed member	1924–1928	John Goldie-Taubman
Frank Dagleish	Elected member	1931–1946	Edward Callister
Charles Gill	Elected member	1934–1954	Arthur Crookall
Arthur Crookall	Elected member	1934–1935	Joseph Qualtrough
Joseph Callister	Elected member	1946–1958	Unknown
Ewan Farrant	Elected member	1954–1964	Unknown
Hubert Radcliffe	Unknown	1963–1974	Unknown

== Historical composition ==
=== Original ===
The original function of the Legislative Council was executive (i.e. giving advice to the Lieutenant Governor — or Lords of Mann prior to Revestment) and its membership was entirely appointed, as follows:

- Lieutenant Governor
- Bishop of Sodor and Man
- First Deemster
- Second Deemster
- Clerk of the Rolls (Position amalgamated with the First Deemster in 1918.)
- Attorney General
- Receiver General
- Water Bailiff (position dissolved 1885)
- Archdeacon of Sodor and Man
- Vicar General of Sodor and Man (At various times there were two of these.)

Historically the "Comptroller" (a position sometimes held together with another office such as that of Receiver-General) and an "Archdeacon's Official" were also members. Before the Reformation the Council included other prelates, such as the Abbot of Rushen.

The first seven were Crown appointments and the last two appointments by the Bishop. Reforms were slowly made to reduce the number of judicial and religious appointments and these members were slowly replaced by indirectly elected members.

=== 1917 reform ===
In 1917, the Judicature (Amendment) Act introduced by the Legislative Council removed Clerk of the Rolls from the composition of the Council. It then consisted of the following members:

- Lieutenant Governor
- Bishop of Sodor and Man
- First Deemster
- Second Deemster
- Attorney General
- Receiver General
- Archdeacon of Sodor and Man
- Vicar General of Sodor and Man

=== 1919 reform ===
In 1919, The Archdeacon; the Vicar General; and the Receiver General were removed as ex officio members of the Council by the Isle of Man Constitution Amendment Act 1919. The members were thus:

- Lieutenant Governor
- First Deemster
- Second Deemster
- Attorney General
- Bishop of Sodor and Man
- Two members appointed by the Lieutenant Governor
- Four members elected by the House of Keys

=== 1961 reform ===
Increased the number of elected members from four to five.

=== 1965 reform ===
The Second Deemster lost his seat in the Council. The members were thus:

- Lieutenant Governor
- First Deemster
- Attorney General
- Bishop of Sodor and Man
- Two members appointed by the Lieutenant Governor
- Five members elected by the House of Keys

=== 1969 reform ===
The Isle of Man Constitution Act 1969 removed the two appointed members of the Legislative Council. The members were thus:

- Lieutenant Governor
- First Deemster
- Attorney General
- Bishop of Sodor and Man
- Seven members elected by the House of Keys

=== 1971 reform ===
The Isle of Man Constitution Act 1971 removed the Attorney-General's vote, and he no longer counted towards a quorum.

=== 1975 reform ===
The First Deemster lost his seat in the Council, by virtue of the Isle of Man Constitution (Amendment) Act 1975. The members were thus:

- Lieutenant Governor
- Attorney General
- Bishop of Sodor and Man
- Eight members elected by the House of Keys

=== 1980 reform ===
The Lieutenant Governor was removed as Presiding Officer and replaced by an indirectly elected President of the Legislative Council. The Governor still presided at joint sittings of Tynwald. The members were thus:

- President of the Legislative Council
- Attorney General
- Bishop of Sodor and Man
- Eight members elected by the House of Keys
