= Department of Trade and Industry (Isle of Man) =

The Department of Trade and Industry (Manx: Rheynn Dellal as Jeadys) was a department of the Isle of Man Government from 1996 to 2010.

== History ==
The Industry Board was first established in 1981.

In 1986 it became the Department of Industry, following the creation of the Ministerial system.

From then until 1996 the department was known as the Department of Industry, when it was renamed the Department of Trade and Industry.

In 2010, the Department was merged into the newly created Department of Economic Development.

== Department heads ==
=== Ministers of Trade and Industry ===
- David Cretney MHK, 2006-2010
- Alex Downie MLC, 2002-2006
- David North MHK, 1996-2002

=== Ministers of Industry ===
- Edmund Lowey MLC, 1992-1996
- Allan Bell MHK, 1991-1996
- Bernie May MHK, 1988-1991
- Ian Anderson MLC, 1986-1991

=== Chairmen of the Board of Industry ===
- Ian Anderson MLC, 1984-1986
- Edward Kerruish MLC, 1981-1984
