= John Corlett (attorney general) =

Manx politician

William John Howarth Corlett, KC, LL.B (born 25 March 1950) was Her Majesty's Attorney General for the Isle of Man and ex officio Member of the Legislative Council from 1998 to 2011.

He was called to English Bar in 1972 and the Manx Bar in 1974. He was a partner of Dickinson Cruickshank & Co 1975-1992 when he became senior partner of Corlett Bolton & Co before being appointed Attorney General in 1998. He was appointed Queen's Counsel in 1999.
