= Terry Groves =

Manx politician

Terence Randolph Alexander Groves was a Member of the House of Keys in the Isle of Man and Government Minister.

He was born in 1946 in Douglas, Isle of Man and educated at Shrewsbury School. His career was in Real Estate and he was also a director of an insurance company, Royal Skandia, and a number of other companies. He was a keen golfer.

He was elected MHK for Ramsey in 1991 and stood down in 1996.

== Governmental positions ==
- Minister of Local Government and the Environment, 1994–1996
