= Alan Crowe =

Manx politician (born 1940)

- Born: Edward Alan Crowe; 1 September 1940 (age 85); Isle of Man
- Education: Kirk Michael Primary School; Ramsey Grammar School; Loughborough Training College
- Occupations: Politician, teacher
- Years active: 1991–present
- Employer(s): Isle of Man Bank (1968–72); Isle of Man Government (1991–present)
- Spouse: Dorothy Wagstaff
- Children: 2

Edward "Alan" Crowe MLC, FCIS, ACIB (born 1 September 1940) is a former Manx politician and former teacher, who was successively a member of both branches of Tynwald in the Isle of Man.

== Early life and career ==
Born on 1 September 1940 to George Henry Crowe and Esther Annie Crowe (née Caley), he was educated at Ramsey Grammar School and Loughborough Training College. He was awarded a teaching diploma, and taught initially in England and then in Canada. He then embarked upon a banking career, initially with the Isle of Man Bank, and became the Company Secretary and Executive Director of various companies, including Eagle Star (International Life). He is also a Fellow of the Institute of Chartered Secretaries and Administrators, a Chartered Company Secretary and an Associate of the Chartered Institute of Bankers.

He contested Douglas North unsuccessfully in the 1991 General Election, but was elected Member of the House of Keys for that constituency in a 1995 by-election. He was elevated to the Legislative Council of the Isle of Man in 1998, and remained there until his retirement in 2003. He returned to the Council from 2007 to 2015.

== Government positions ==
- Chairman of the Financial Supervision Commission, 2001–03
- Chairman of Isle of Man Post Office, 2008–11
