= Garff =

Sheading of the Isle of Man

Garff Garff
- Sheading
- Sheading of Garff
- Crown dependency: Isle of Man
- Parishes: Lonan, Maughold
- Town: Ramsey
- Village: Laxey

Area
  - Total: 75.80 km^{2} (29.27 sq mi)
  - Rank: 5

Population (2021) (Note: Including Ramsey)
  - Total: 12,543
  - Density: 165.5/km^{2} (428.6/sq mi)

Garff (Manx: Garff) is one of the six sheadings of the Isle of Man.

It is located on the east of the island (part of the traditional South Side division) and consists of the two historic parishes of Lonan and Maughold. Before 1796 it also included the parish of Onchan.

Administratively, since May 2016 the sheading of Garff has been covered by a single Garff local authority, a parish district, formed by merging the former village district of Laxey with the parish districts of Lonan and Maughold.

The town of Ramsey, which is administered separately, covers areas of two historic parishes (Maughold, and Lezayre in the sheading of Ayre). It is treated as part of Garff for some purposes, e.g. the coroner.

Other settlements in the sheading include Baldrine and Ballabeg (both in the parish of Lonan), and Ballure in the parish of Maughold.

== Etymology ==
The origin of the name is uncertain. Kneen (1925) suggests that it derives from the Norse gröf (N.B. not grðf, which is a typo there), meaning a pit or ravine (cognate with "grave").

== MHKs and elections ==
Garff is also a House of Keys constituency (excluding (most of) Onchan). It was originally a three-seat constituency, but this was reduced to two seats in 1893 and one seat in 1986. Until 2016 it was heavily under-represented by having only a single MHK. However in the 2016 general election it elected 2 MHKs (the new constituency also includes the (sparsely populated) parish of Onchan, i.e. excluding the village of Onchan).

Year	Election	Turnout	Candidates
1867	General Election	No information available	
1875	General Election	No information available	
1881	General Election	John Allen Mylrea elected, no other information available	
1886	General Election	John Allen Mylrea elected, no other information available	
1891	General Election	John Allen Mylrea elected, no other information available	
1896	General Election	John Allen Mylrea elected, no other information available	
1900	By-Election	Due to the resignation of J. A. Mylrea, no other information available	
1903	General Election		John Robert Kerruish, elected unopposed; John Killip, elected unopposed
By-election called following the resignation of John Killip
1908	By-Election		Robert Kerruish, elected unopposed
No information available on unsuccessful candidates from 1908-1985
1908	General Election		John Robert Kerruish, 468 votes, elected; Robert Kerruish, 407 votes, elected
1913	General Election	No information available	
1919	General Election	No information available	
1924	General Election		Thomas Callow, elected; Walter Cowin, elected
1929	General Election		Thomas Callow, elected; Walter Cowin, elected
1934	General Election		Thomas Callow, elected; Walter Cowin, elected
1946	General Election		Sir Charles Kerruish, elected
1951	General Election		Sir Charles Kerruish, elected; Annie Bridson, elected
1956	General Election		Sir Charles Kerruish, elected
1962	General Election		Sir Charles Kerruish, elected; Eric Moore, elected
1966	General Election		Sir Charles Kerruish, elected; Jean Thornton-Duesbery, elected
1971	General Election		Sir Charles Kerruish, elected; Jean Thornton-Duesbery, elected
1976	General Election		Sir Charles Kerruish, elected; Lieutenant Colonel Dr Edgar Mann, elected
1981	General Election		Sir Charles Kerruish, elected; Lt Col Dr Edgar Mann, elected
By-election called following the elevation of Edgar Mann to the Legislative Council
1985	By-Election		James Harris Kneale BA, elected
Garff loses the District of Onchan and becomes a single seat constituency
1986	General Election	79%	Sir Charles Kerruish (1113 votes, elected); Lt Col Dr Edgar Mann (889 votes)
By-election called following the election of Sir Charles Kerruish as President of Tynwald and thus his elevation to the Legislative Council
1990	By-Election	59.6%	Lt Col Dr Edgar Mann (648 votes, elected); James McKenzie (293 votes); D Corlett (252 votes); D Robertson (198 votes)
1991	General Election	64%	Lt Col Dr Edgar Mann (899 votes, elected); James McKenzie (444 votes); Harry Wade (376 votes)
By-election called following the re-elevation of Edgar Mann to the Legislative Council
1995	By Election	61.7%	Steve Rodan (562 votes, elected); Faragher (462 votes); James McKenzie (319 votes); Andrew Smith (228 votes); Sharpe (71 votes)
1996	General Election	64.5%	Steve Rodan (1257 votes, elected); James McKenzie (473 votes); Kenneth Morkille (52 votes)
2001	General Election	63.7%	Steve Rodan (1176 votes, elected); Marianne Kerruish (809 votes)
2006	General Election		Steve Rodan (1400 votes, elected); Nigel Dobson (524 votes)
2011	General Election		Steve Rodan (1725 votes, elected); Nigel Dobson (136 votes)
Garff becomes a two-seat constituency

== Election results since 2016 ==
In 2014, Tynwald approved recommendations from the Boundary Review Commission which saw the reform of the Island's electoral boundaries.

General election 2021: Garff
Party	Candidate	Votes	%
Independent	Daphne Hilary Penelope Caine	1,122	23.4
Independent	Andrew Joseph Smith	1,112	23.2
Manx Labour	Gareth Young	1,021	21.3
Independent	Martyn Jones Perkins	971	20.2
Independent	Jamie Smith	576	12.0
Total votes		4,802	
Total ballots		2,718	
Rejected ballots		7	
Turnout		2,725	51.5
Registered electors		5,292	

General election 2016: Garff
Party	Candidate	Votes	%
Independent	Martyn John Perkins	1,767	36.4
Independent	Daphne Hilary Penelope Caine	1,270	26.1
Independent	Andrew Joseph Smith	1,247	25.7
Independent	Andrew Barton	346	7.1
Independent	Nigel Anthony Dobson	231	4.8
Total votes		4,861	
Total ballots		2,510	
Rejected ballots		13	
Turnout		2,523	49.8
Registered electors		5,069	

== See also ==
- Local government in the Isle of Man
- Laxey Bay
- Ramsey Bay
