= John Raymond Kniveton =

Manx politician (1933–2011)

John Raymond Kniveton (5 May 1933 – 11 October 2011) was a Member of the Legislative Council of the Isle of Man.

== Life and career ==
Born on 5 May 1933, he was educated at Douglas High School. He joined NatWest Bank and the Royal Air Force before becoming the managing director of Tours (Isle of Man) and a director of Laxey Glen Mills. Kniveton was a member of Onchan Commissioners between 1989 and 1995 and was elected to the House of Keys in 1994. In 1998 he was elevated to the Legislative Council. Kniveton died on 11 October 2011, at the age of 78.
