= Department of Agriculture, Fisheries and Forestry (Isle of Man) =

Former department of the Isle of Man Government

The Department of Agriculture, Fisheries and Forestry (Manx: Rheynn Eirinys, Eeastaght as Keylljyn) or DAFF is a former department of the Isle of Man Government.

In April 2010, the department was broken up and most functions absorbed by Department of Environment, Food and Agriculture

== Previous Ministers ==
=== Previous Ministers for Environment, Food and Agriculture ===
- Geoffrey Boot MHK, 2016–present
- Richard Ronan MHK, 2014–2016
- Phil Gawne MHK, 2011–2014
- John Shimmin MHK, 2010–2011

=== Previous Ministers for Agriculture, Fisheries and Forestry ===
- Phil Gawne MHK, 2005–2010
- Bill Henderson MHK, 2004–2005
- John Rimmington MHK, 2002–2004
- Alex Downie MLC, 1999–2002
- Hazel Hannan MHK, 1995–1999
- John Corrin MHK, 1991–1995
- David North MHK, 1989–1991
- Donald Gelling MLC, 1988–1989
- Don Maddrell MHK, 1986–1988

=== Previous Chairmen of the Board of Agriculture and Fisheries ===
- Norman Radcliffe MLC, 1985–1986
- John Radcliffe. M.H.K. 1981–1985
- Dr Colonel Edgar Mann, 1980–1981
- Unknown, 1971–1980
- Norman Crowe MHK, 1967–1971
- Unknown, 1958–1967
- Richard Cannell MHK, 1950–1958
- John Cowin MLC, 1946–1950
