= Alliance for Progressive Government =

Political grouping in the Isle of Man

The Alliance for Progressive Government (APG), a political pressure group in the Isle of Man, was formed in 1991 as a grouping of members of the House of Keys (MHKs) who wanted to provide a coherent opposition to the Manx government. They were initially called the Alternative Policy Group, before changing their name to the Alliance for Progressive Government in 1998. At their formation they had five MHKs, and in the 1996 general election they had six members elected. Two more were elected at by-elections, giving them at one stage eight out of the 24 members of the House of Keys; but 3 MHKs resigned from the Alliance between 1996 and 2001. In the 2001 election they had three members elected (out of four candidates nominated).

The APG MHKs made a point of advancing alternative policies to the Isle of Man Government, as well as questioning and scrutinising government policy.
