= George Waft =

Manx politician (1937–2026)

Member of the Legislative Council of the Isle of Man
- In office 1994–2010

Member of the House of Keys
- In office 1991–1994

Personal details
- Born: 1937
- Died: 29 September 2026 (aged 89) Strang, Isle of Man
- Spouse: Lynn Jeanette Howarth (m. 1961)

George Henry Waft (1937 – 29 September 2026) was a Manx politician who served in the Legislative Council of the Isle of Man from 1994 to 2010. Prior to his tenure in the legislative council, he was a member of Onchan's board of commissioners from 1971 to 1991, and of the House of Keys from 1991 to 1994.

== Early life and education ==
George Henry Waft was born in 1937. His father died at age 35 a few months after his birth due to pneumonia. His family moved in with his grandparents; his grandfather George Jewell operated a newspaper agency in Douglas. He was educated at the Tynwald Street and Desmesne Road Primary Schools and Ballakermeen and Douglas High School. Waft attended the Isle of Man College of Further Education, Naval Training College, and Isle of Man Nurse Training School. He also studied through the Open University.

Waft was a catering officer for naval companies. He worked for the Department of Health and Social Security for 30 years as a psychiatric nurse.

== Career ==
From 1971 to 1991, Waft served on Onchan's board of commissioners; he served as chair of the board twice. In 1991, Waft won a seat in the House of Keys through a by-election. He was appointed to the Legislative Council of the Isle of Man in 1994. He left the legislative council in 2010, and retired from politics.

In 1993, the practice of birching was abolished by legislation proposed by Waft. It was already abolished in the jurisdictions of Great Britain and the last attempt to do birching on the Isle of Man was in 1981. Waft was one of the main supporters of the Disability Discrimination Act, which prohibited discrimination against disabled people in education, transportation, and building access. In 2013, he criticised the act not being implemented despite it receiving royal assent in 2006.

Waft joined the Royal British Legion in 1998, and later became president of the RBL's branch in Onchan. He was president of the Overseas Aid Committee. He wrote From Tynwald Street to Tynwald Hill, which was published in 2006.

== Personal life and death ==
Waft married Lynn Jeanette Howarth on 29 April 1961. He died on 29 September 2026, aged 89.

== Works cited ==
=== Books ===
- Irwin, Colin (2005). In Search of Albion: From Cornwall to Cumbria: A Ride Through England's Hidden Soul. Carlton Publishing Group. ISBN 0233001166.
- Maher, Joanne, ed. (2008). The Europa World Year Book. Vol. 2 (49 ed.). Routledge. ISBN 9781857434538.

=== News ===
- "Isle of Man declares an end to 'brutal' birching". Isle of Man Daily Times. 2 May 1961. p. 14 – via Newspapers.com.
- "Man behind DDA disillusioned it's still not fully implemented". Manx Radio. 18 April 2013. Archived from the original on 3 October 2026.
- "Tributes to 'dedicated' former Manx politician". Manx Radio. 12 June 2010. Archived from the original on 3 October 2026.
- Cretney, David (2 October 2026). "David Cretney column: Remembering George Waft's life and legacy". Isle of Man Today. Archived from the original on 5 October 2026.
- Farragher, Tony (6 March 1993). "Isle of Man declares an end to 'brutal' birching". The Independent. p. 2 – via Newspapers.com.
- Morton, Adam (1 October 2026). "Tributes paid to 'dedicated and committed' former Onchan MHK". Isle of Man Today. Archived from the original on 3 October 2026.
- Nicoll, Catherine (1 October 2026). "Tributes to 'dedicated' former Manx politician". BBC. Archived from the original on 3 October 2026.

=== Web ===
- "Passing of former Commissioner George Waft". Onchan. 1 October 2026.
