= Ramsey Grammar School =

Location
- Lezayre Rd; Ramsey, IM8 2TA; Isle of Man; 54.3199°N 4.3956°W

Information
- Type: Comprehensive
- Motto: "Nothing is impossible for an enthusiast!"
- Established: 1681
- Department for Education URN: 132466 Tables
- Head teacher: Sonia Taylor
- Gender: Coeducational
- Age: 11 to 18
- Website: Ramsey Grammar School

Ramsey Grammar School is a coeducational comprehensive secondary school located in Ramsey, on the Isle of Man.

== History ==
A grammar school has existed in Ramsey since 1681. It moved to Lezayre Road in 1933 and was housed in a building that now forms the east building of the present school. It was decommissioned and requisitioned by the military during the Second World War from 1940 to 1946.

In 1946 Ramsey Grammar School was re-opened as a non-selective coeducational comprehensive school. It was the first full comprehensive school in the British Isles with 460 pupils on its register. The school now has over 1,000 pupils with 140 teaching and support staff.

== The site ==
It has 4 buildings, the East building, West building, the PE and games building, and South building, the West and South buildings being connected by a two-level corridor. While the South building was being built, a North building, formerly Auldyn Infants School, was temporarily employed to house pupils that were previously in the South wing of the West building. The South building being opened on 24 October 2007, the North building was demolished, making way for the new junior school for Ramsey, Scoill Ree Gorree.

The South building which cost £6.5 million opened in September 2007. It houses the Special Needs, Design, and Technology departments. There is an open-plan Art studio, Drama studios, a suite of new English rooms, and space for Economics, Business, Politics, Rural and Agricultural Science complete with a teaching piggery with room for 14 piglets. The Sixth Form Centre includes a 122-seat Lecture Theatre. Elsewhere there is a modern Sports Hall recently re-roofed and significantly modernized and a Science Block. The all-weather floodlit astroturf pitch was completely resurfaced in 2011.

Every classroom is networked giving every student and teacher intranet with disk space and controlled internet access and email from every computer. Classrooms each have an electronic smartboard with sound.

== Students ==
The Isle of Man does not have specialist schools, league tables, SATs or the academy initiatives current in England. Schools follow the Manx National Curriculum. Schools are not subject to Ofsted and Examination results are not published. Ramsey Grammar School has, presently, 962 students on roll including a Sixth Form of 184. The Flexible Learning Area is designed for SEBD, MLD, SLD and PMLD students and those requiring Nurture provision. There has been an average of 60% + 5 A*- C with English and Maths passes over the past three years.

== Wartime use ==
Requisitioned by the Air Ministry the school became the Operations Room for the fighter station at RAF Andreas when the station became operational in 1941. During that time information concerning all enemy aircraft flying in the area of the Irish Sea was processed by the Operations Room with aircraft being plotted on a large map, it then being the duty of the Operations Controller to task such fighters as was necessary to intercept.

With the resulting strategic shift of the Luftwaffe following the German Invasion of Russia (Operation Barbarossa) RAF Andreas became a training station and the Operations Room, in turn, became redundant.

However, with the multitude of RAF Stations situated around the Irish Sea area, considerable difficulty began to be experienced concerning the controlling of the various aircraft which were undertaking the training of numerous navigators, air gunners, bomb aimers and wireless operators. The training sorties took the pupils over the sea, and it was considered necessary to set up an organization which would be able to maintain radio contact with the aircraft at any stage of their exercises, in order to pass meteorological conditions and instructions necessary to their safety.

In March 1943 a unit known as the Training Flying Control Centre (TFCC) was formed for this purpose being headed by Wing Commander Bullimore. The TFCC at Ramsey was the only organisation of its type in the whole Royal Air Force, and its layout was peculiar to the work it was required to carry out.

During the peak period of operations, the Station was responsible for the safety of training aircraft from ten separate stations, and it was not uncommon for the Controller and his duty watch of Women's Auxiliary Air Force (WAAFs) and airmen to be responsible for the safety of over 200 aircraft flying at the same time, each carrying an average crew of five.

The system of control was highly technical; the Operations Room being divided into three parts:

- Signals Interception Room. This was staffed by WAAFs who would listen out for all signals passed between aircraft for which the Station was responsible.
- Navigation Room. This is where the positions of the aircraft were mapped out using the bearing which had been intercepted by the wireless operators.
- Operations Room. This is where the information gathered would be plotted on the large plotting table.

The TFCC was stood down and disbanded following the cessation of hostilities in 1945.

== Notable former pupils ==
- Allan Bell, politician
- Alan Crowe, politician
- Beckii Cruel, singer and entertainer
- Conor Cummins, motorcycle racer
- G.A.M. Isherwood, rugby player
- Thomas Kneen, Clerk of the Rolls
- David Knight, world champion enduro motorcycle rider
- Constance Radcliffe, historian and recipient of the Reih Bleeaney Vanannan
- Norman Radcliffe, politician
- Percy Radcliffe, politician
- Eddie Teare, politician
- Andrew Williamson, deputy deemster
