= House of Keys constituencies =

Isle of Man parliament seats

These are the constituencies used in the elections to the House of Keys, the lower house of the parliament of the Isle of Man.

== Constituencies from 2016 ==
Constituency	Sheading	Local government areas	MHKs
Arbory, Castletown & Malew	Rushen	Arbory, Castletown, Malew and parts of east Rushen	2
Ayre & Michael	Ayre, Michael	Andreas, Ballaugh, Bride, Jurby, Lezayre and Michael	2
Douglas Central	Middle	Douglas	2
Douglas East	Middle	Douglas	2
Douglas North	Middle	Douglas	2
Douglas South	Middle	Douglas	2
Garff	Garff excluding parts of Onchan	Garff parish (comprising the former Laxey, Lonan, Maughold) and parts of north Onchan	2
Glenfaba & Peel	Glenfaba	German, Patrick and Peel	2
Middle	Middle excluding Douglas	Braddan, Marown and Santon	2
Onchan	Garff	Onchan excluding parts of north Onchan	2
Ramsey	Ayre	Ramsey	2
Rushen	Rushen	Port St Mary, Port Erin and most of Rushen	2
Total			24

== Constituencies from 1986–2011 ==
The constituencies used for the 1986, 1991, 1996, 2001, 2006 and 2011 General Elections for the House of Keys were:

Keys constituencies 1986-2011

Constituency	Sheading	Local Government Areas	MHKs
Ayre	Ayre	Andreas, Bride, Lezayre	1
Glenfaba	Glenfaba	German, Patrick	1
Garff	Garff without Onchan	Lonan, Maughold, Laxey	1
Michael	Michael	Ballaugh, Jurby, Michael	1
Rushen	Rushen	Arbory, Rushen, Port St Mary, Port Erin	3
Middle	Middle without Santon Parish or Douglas	Braddan, Marown	1
Malew and Santon	Parts of Middle and Rushen	Malew, Santon	1
Douglas East	Middle	Douglas	2
Douglas West	Middle	Douglas	2
Douglas North	Middle	Douglas	2
Douglas South	Middle	Douglas	2
Castletown	Rushen	Castletown	1
Onchan	Garff	Onchan	3
Peel	Glenfaba	Peel	1
Ramsey	Ayre	Ramsey	2
Total			24

== 1986 changes ==
- Garff and Ayre became one seat constituencies, having previously each had two seats.
- Onchan constituency was created, having been previously part of Middle constituency.
- Middle constituency was created from the parishes of Marown (formerly part of Glenfaba constituency) and Braddan.
- Malew and Santon constituency was created from the parishes of Malew (formerly part of Rushen constituency), and Santon (formerly part of Middle constituency).

== 1867 to 2011 elections ==
The original constituencies set out in the House of Keys Election Act 1866, providing for the House to be elected for the first time. These are shown below and were used for the 1867, 1875, and 1881 General Elections.

The arrangements for elections between 1881 and 1903 are not currently shown in the table.

The original constituencies were altered by the Redistribution Act 1893 as follows:

These were used for the 1903, 1908, 1913 and 1919 General Elections. The same constituencies and distribution of seats were also used for the 1934, 1946 and 1951 elections and so are likely also to have been used for the 1924 and 1929 elections.

The distribution of seats was changed for the 1956 election, and again for the 1986 election, as shown.

Constituency	MHKs				
Constituency	1867-1881	1903-1951	1956-1981	1986-2011	
Glenfaba (s)	3	3	2		1
Michael (s)	3	2	1		1
Ayre (s)	3	3	2		1
Garff (s)	3	2	2	Garff	1
Garff (s)	3	2	2	Onchan	3
Middle (s)	3	3	3	Onchan	3
Middle (s)	3	3	3	Middle	1
Middle (s)	3	3	3	Malew and Santon	1
Rushen (s)	3	3	3	Malew and Santon	1
Rushen (s)	3	3	3	Rushen	3
Douglas South (t)	3	2	2		2
Douglas East (t)	3	-	2		2
Douglas West (t)	3	-	2		2
Douglas North (t)	3	3	1		2
Castletown (t)	1	1	1		1
Peel (t)	1	1	1		1
Ramsey (t)	1	1	2		2
Total	24				

(s) = sheading, (t) = town

Further back in history, before democratic elections, each of the six sheadings was represented by four members.
