= Pamela Crowe =

Manx politician

Pamela Mavis Crowe is a former Member of the Legislative Council of the Isle of Man. Prior to entering politics she was a director of Crowes Ltd and an author of several books. She was the MHK for Rushen from 1997 to 2003, when she was elected to the Legislative Council.

She was awarded with an MBE in the 2022 Birthday Honours.

== Governmental positions ==
- Chairman of the Isle of Man Post Office, 2004–2008
- Minister of Local Government and the Environment, 2002–2004
- Chairman of the Isle of Man Office of Fair Trading, 1997–2002
