= Ayre =

Sheading of the Isle of Man

Ayre Inver Ayre
- Sheading
- Sheading of Ayre
- Crown dependency: Isle of Man
- Parishes: Andreas, Bride, Lezayre

Area
  - Total: 115.1 km^{2} (44.4 sq mi)
  - Rank: 2

Population (2021) (Note: Not including Ramsey)
  - Total: 2,989
  - Density: 25.97/km^{2} (67.26/sq mi)

Ayre (/ɛər/ AIR; Manx: Inver Ayre) is one of the six sheadings of the Isle of Man.

It is located in the north of the island (part of the traditional North Side division) and consists of the three historic parishes of Andreas, Bride and (Kirk Christ) Lezayre.

The town of Ramsey, which is administered separately, covers areas of two historic parishes (Lezayre, and Maughold in the sheading of Garff). It is treated as part of Garff for some purposes, e.g. the coroner.

Other settlements in the sheading include Glen Auldyn and Sulby (both in the parish of Lezayre).

== Etymology ==
The derivation of the word ayre is from Old Norse "eyrr", meaning a shingle beach. It refers to a storm beach forming a narrow spit of shingle or sand cutting across the landward and seaward ends of a shallow bay. This may partly cut off a sheltered stretch of water from the sea to form a shallow freshwater loch. This word is still in use for the particular landform in the Northern Isles of Scotland.

== MHKs and elections ==
Before the 2016 elections, Ayre was one of the House of Keys constituencies. It is now part of the Ayre & Michael constituency.

Year	Election	Turnout	Candidates
1903	General Elections	?	Robert Cowley, 477 votes, elected; Robert Sayle Corlett, ? votes, elected; William John Radcliffe, 419 votes, elected; Thomas Allen, 397 votes
1913	General Election	??	William Charles Southward (elected); ?
1919	General Election	?	Richard Cain, elected; William Charles Southward CP JP, elected; Daniel Joughin Teare CP JP, elected; ?
1924	General Election	?	Richard Cain, elected; John Crellin, elected; Daniel Joughin Teare CP JP, elected; ?
1929	General Election	?	Richard Cain, elected; Arthur James Cottier, elected; Daniel Joughin Teare CP JP, elected; ?
1934	General Election	?	Ewan Farrant, elected; Arthur James Cottier, elected; Daniel Joughin Teare CP JP, elected; ?
1962	General Election	?	Robert Kerruish, elected; ?
1966	General Election	?	Robert Kerruish, elected; ?
1976	General Election		Percy Radcliffe; John Norman Radcliffe
Called following the elevation to the LegCo of Percy Radcliffe.
1980	By-Election	?	Clare Christian; ?
1981	General Election	?	John Norman Radcliffe, elected; Clare Christian, elected; David Cannan
Ayre becomes a 1-seat constituency, previously having had 2 seats. Norman Radcliffe elevated to LegCo in 1985.
1986	General Election	80.8%	Edgar Quine (831 votes, elected); Clare Christian (765 votes); A Robertson (109 votes)
1991	General Election		Edgar Quine, elected unopposed
1996	General Election	72.9%	Edgar Quine (1246 votes, elected); Eva Bradley (167 votes)
2001	General Election	58.85%	Edgar Quine, 1038 votes, elected; Thurston Arrowsmith, 202 votes
Called following the resignation of Edgar Quine.
2004	By-Election	69.4%	Eddie Teare, 733 votes, elected; John Crellin, 542 votes; Hazel Bradley, 283 votes
2006	General Election	N/A	Eddie Teare, elected unopposed
2011	General Election	67.4%	Eddie Teare, 1060 votes, elected; Andrew Newington-Bridges, 429 votes; Pat Ayres, 134 votes

== See also ==
- Local government in the Isle of Man
