= Alex Downie =

Manx politician

Alexander Frank Downie, OBE, MLC (born 1945, Douglas) is a Manx politician and former marine engineer. He is a member of the Legislative Council of the Isle of Man and a former Trade and Industry Minister of the Government. He was a Member of the House of Keys from 1991 until his election to the Legislative Council in 2005. Before going into politics, he was marine seagoing engineer for various companies and self-employed in the heating maintenance business.

== Personal life ==
Downie was born in 1945 in Douglas, Isle of Man.

Downie is a freemason. As of April 2017, he is the Deputy Provincial Grand Master for the Isle of Man.

== Ministerial positions ==
- Minister of Trade and Industry, 2002–2006
- Minister of Agriculture, Fisheries and Forestry, 1999–2002
