= Leonard Singer =

British politician (1943–2023)

- Born: Leonard Ian Singer; 27 January 1943; Manchester, Lancashire, England
- Died: 27 December 2023 (aged 80); Strang, Isle of Man
- Occupations: Politician, pharmacist
- Years active: 1966–2016 (pharmacist); 1996–2016 (politician)
- Employer: Isle of Man Government

Leonard Ian Singer (27 January 1943 – 27 December 2023) was a British politician and pharmacist based in Ramsey, Isle of Man.

== Life and career ==
Leonard Ian Singer was born in Manchester on 27 January 1943. He qualified as a pharmacist in 1966. He resided in Portugal and Tenerife. He moved to the Island in 1989 and set up Singers Pharmacy in Ramsey, Isle of Man. He was involved in local politics as a member of Stockport Metropolitan Borough Council from 1973 until 1986, and as a Ramsey Town Commissioner from 1991 to 1996. In 1996, he was elected as an MHK for Ramsey and in 2003 was elevated to the Legislative Council.

In 2006, he resigned from the LegCo and stood in the general election for the House of Keys in Ramsey on the issue of restoring the 24-hour cover at Ramsey Cottage Hospital. However he was narrowly defeated and thus lost his seat in Tynwald.

Continuing his career in politics firstly being voted on to Ramsey Commissioners with a large majority of the votes in 2008 and in the 2011 General Election, Leonard Singer was re-elected to the House of Keys representing Ramsey defeating the Treasury Minister Anne Craine. He was appointed Deputy Speaker in 2012.

As a Chairman of Friends of League of Friends of Ramsey Hospital, Singer initiated the donation of new technological systems to the Ramsey Cottage Hospital, making it the first in the British Isles to be using new 24-hour sensor technology to monitor patients.

Singer died on 27 December 2023, at the age of 80 at Noble's Hospital.

== Governmental positions ==
- Member for Mental Health Services, August 2012 – 2013.
- Member for Social Care, November 2011 –2013.

Member of department of Infrastructure 2012 to 2016.

- Chairman of the Isle of Man Film Commission, 2001–06.
