= Allan Bell =

Chief Minister of the Isle of Man (born 1947)

The Honourable Allan Bell CBE MHK
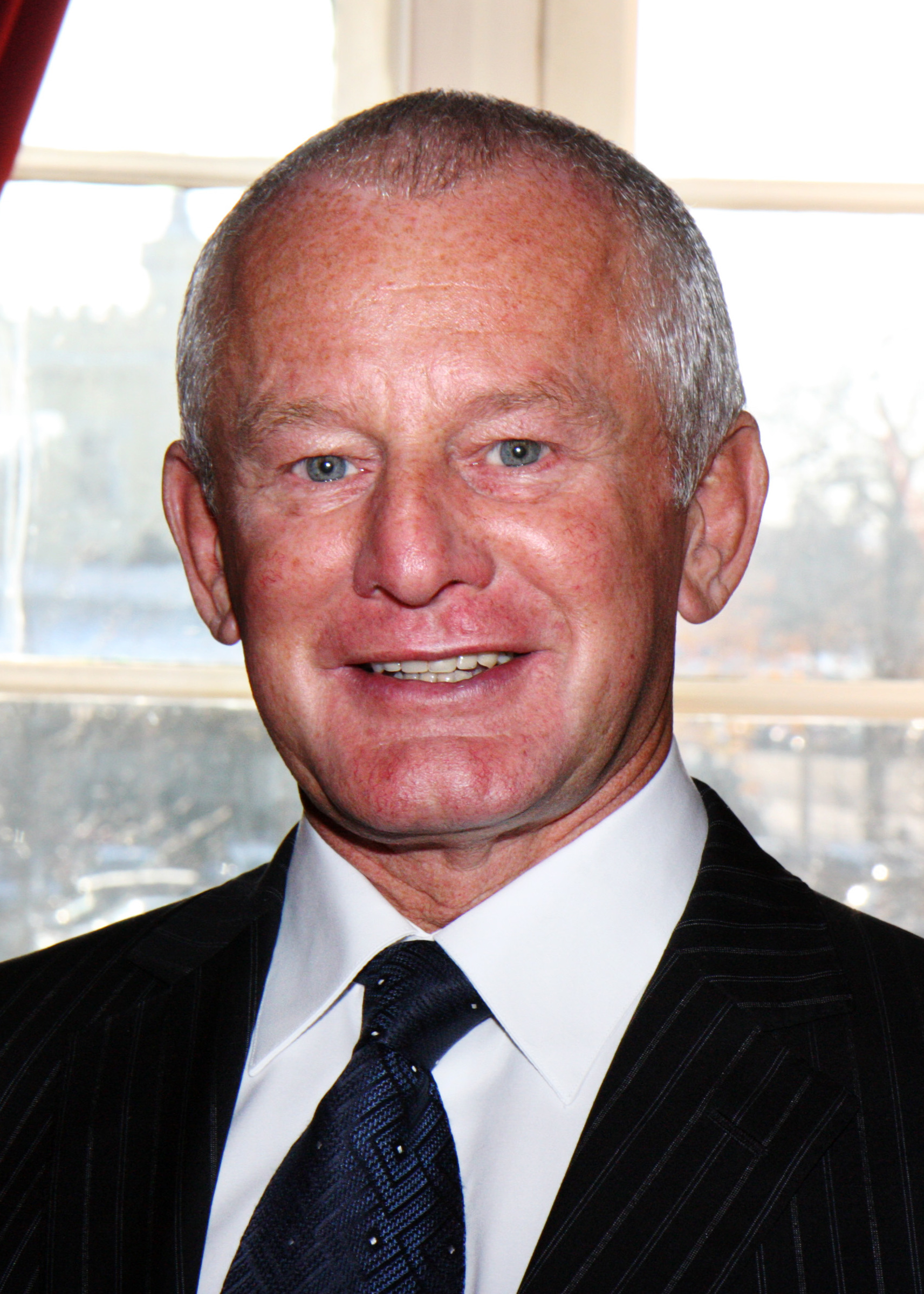

Chief Minister of the Isle of Man
- In office 11 October 2011 – 4 October 2016
- Monarch: Elizabeth II
- Lieutenant Governor: Adam Wood; Richard Gozney
- Preceded by: Tony Brown
- Succeeded by: Howard Quayle

Minister for Economic Development
- In office 2010–2011
- Monarch: Elizabeth II
- Preceded by: New position
- Succeeded by: John Shimmin

Minister for the Treasury
- In office 2001–2010
- Monarch: Elizabeth II
- Preceded by: Richard Corkill
- Succeeded by: Anne Craine

Minister for Home Affairs
- In office 1996–2001
- Monarch: Elizabeth II
- Preceded by: Richard Corkill
- Succeeded by: Phil Braidwood

Personal details
- Born: Allan Robert Bell; 20 July 1947 (age 79)
- Party: Independent
- Other political affiliations: Mec Vannin (before 1984)

Allan Robert Bell CBE (born 20 July 1947) is a Manx politician who was the Chief Minister of the Isle of Man from 2011 until 2016, having been elected to that position on 11 October 2011. He was an independent Member of the House of Keys for Ramsey from 1984 to September 2016, and served in several different ministerial roles. He was replaced as Chief Minister on 4 October 2016.

== Early life and education ==
Bell was educated at Ramsey Grammar School. He was involved in banking and clothing retail prior to entering politics.

== Political career ==
Bell was first elected to the House of Keys as an independent representing Ramsey in a 1984 by-election and continued as such until 22 September 2016 when he did not seek re-election. He had first, unsuccessfully contested Ramsey in 1976 as a candidate for Manx nationalist party Mec Vannin.

He served in numerous ministerial roles including Minister for Tourism and Transport, from 1986 to 1990, Minister of Tourism, Leisure and Transport, from 1990 to 1994, Minister of Industry, from 1991 to 1996, Minister of Home Affairs, from 1996 to 2001, Minister of the Treasury, from 2001 to 2010 and was the first Minister for Economic Development, from 2010 to 2011.

He was named as a central figure in the "corruption of the system of government" identified by Mount Murray Commission of Inquiry (2002–2003), referring to his time as Tourism Minister in the early 1990s.

=== Chief Minister ===
On 11 October 2011, Bell was elected Chief Minister of the Isle of Man, winning a clear majority over Liberal Vannin opponent Peter Karran. Bell was proposed by Eddie Teare and seconded by Laurence Skelly.

While Bell was Chief Minister in 2013, the government signed a deal involving a £1.3 million bail-out loan and property purchase for the hotel chain Sefton Group which Bell stated was a "small but decisive part" in "support[ing] the economy". After a legal review found the deal to be "outside of government powers", Bell initially refused to accept the proffered resignation of the economic development minister, John Shimmin.

Bell was appointed Commander of the Order of the British Empire (CBE) in the 2016 Birthday Honours for public service to the Isle of Man.

== Government positions ==
- Minister of Tourism and Transport, 1986–90
- Minister of Tourism, Leisure and Transport, 1990–94
- Minister of Industry, 1991–96
- Minister of Home Affairs, 1996–2001
- Minister of the Treasury, 2001–10
- Minister for Economic Development, 2010–11
- Chief Minister of the Isle of Man, 2011–2016

== Personal life ==
In a 2015 interview with The Guardian, Bell stated that "People know that I’m gay. I’ve never made a secret of it, but no one has ever asked me."

== Retirement ==
On 1 August 2016, Bell announced that he was retiring after 37 years within Manx politics.

== See also ==
- List of LGBT heads of government
- List of the first LGBT holders of political offices

Political offices
Preceded by Tony Brown	Chief Minister of the Isle of Man; 2011–16	Succeeded by Howard Quayle
