= Council of Ministers of the Isle of Man =

Executive body of the Isle of Man Government

The Council of Ministers (Manx: Coonseil ny Shirveishee; often abbreviated informally to "CoMin") is the principal executive organ of the Isle of Man Government. Its role is similar to, though not identical with, that of the Cabinet in the United Kingdom. Until 1990, its title was the Executive Council.

The Executive Council, chaired by the Lieutenant Governor and including members of Tynwald, was established in 1949, and gradually thereafter became the effective government of the Island. The Lieutenant Governor ceased to chair the Executive Council in 1980, being replaced by a chairman elected by Tynwald, and the Council was reconstituted in 1985 to include the chairmen of the eight principal boards of Tynwald; in 1986, they were given the title Minister and the chairman was styled Chief Minister. In 1990, the Council was renamed the Council of Ministers.

The Council of Ministers consists of the Chief Minister and not more than nine ministers. The Chief Minister must be a Member of the House of Keys and ministers must be members of Tynwald. Originally, the Chief Minister was appointed by the Lieutenant Governor on the nomination of Tynwald. On 20 March 2018 this changed so that the Chief Minister is appointed by the Lieutenant Governor on the nomination of and from among the members of House of Keys, as it is the directly elected chamber. Ministers are appointed by the Lieutenant Governor, acting on the advice of and with the concurrence of the Chief Minister. The Chief Minister assigns a minister to each department of the Isle of Man Government. The Council of Ministers must command the confidence of 16 members of the House of Keys.

== Current membership ==
- Chief Minister (Ard-shirveishagh) – Chris Thomas MHK
- Minister for the Cabinet Office (Shirveishagh son Oik Coonceil ny Shirveishee) – Chris Thomas MHK
- Minister for Education, Sport and Culture (Shirveishagh son Ynsee, Spoyrt as Cultoor) – Sarah Maltby MHK
- Minister for Enterprise (Shirveishagh son Gostid Dellal) – Robert Cowell MHK
- Minister for Environment, Food and Agriculture (Shirveishagh son Chymmyltaght, Bee as Eirinys) – Dr Rachel Glover MHK
- Minister for Health and Social Care (Shirveishagh son Slaynt as Kiarail y Theay) – Claire Christian MHK
- Minister for Justice and Home Affairs (Shirveishagh son Jeerys as Cooishyn Sthie) – Jane Poole-Wilson MHK
- Minister for Infrastructure (Shirveishagh son Bun-troggalys) – Jason Moorhouse MHK
- Minister for the Treasury (Shirveishagh Tashtee) – Michael Crowe MHK

== Current and historical composition of Council of Ministers / Executive Council ==
=== Structure of the Council of Ministers effective from 1 April 2014 ===
From	Chief Minister	Minister									
From	Chief Minister	for the Cabinet Office (Note: The Cabinet Office was legally established on 1 January 2016 and requires a Minister under the Government Departments Act 1987.)	for Enterprise (Note: Formerly the Department of Economic Development - renamed the Department for Enterprise, with various functions transferred on 24 November 2017.)	for Education, Sport and Culture (Note: Formerly the Department of Education and Children - renamed the Department of Education, Sport and Culture, with various functions transferred on 24 November 2017.)	for Environment, Food and Agriculture	for Health and Social Care	for Justice and Home Affairs (Note: The title of the Minister for Home Affairs was changed to Minister for Justice and Home Affairs on 1 December 2020)	for Infrastructure	for Policy and Reform	for the Treasury	without Portfolio
16/10/2026	Chris Thomas MHK	Chris Thomas MHK	Robert Cowell MHK	Sarah Maltby MHK	Dr Rachel Glover MHK	Claire Christian MHK	Jane Poole-Wilson MHK	Jason Moorhouse MHK	N/A	Michael Crowe MHK	N/A
13/10/2026	Chris Thomas MHK	Alfred Cannan MHK	Tim Johnston MHK	Daphne Caine MHK	Clare Barber MHK	Claire Christian MHK	Jane Poole-Wilson MHK	Tim Crookall MHK	N/A	Chris Thomas MHK	N/A
29/09/2026	Alfred Cannan MHK	Alfred Cannan MHK	Tim Johnston MHK	Daphne Caine MHK	Clare Barber MHK	Claire Christian MHK	Jane Poole-Wilson MHK	Tim Crookall MHK	N/A	Chris Thomas MHK	N/A
19/01/2025	Alfred Cannan MHK	David Ashford MHK	Tim Johnston MHK	Daphne Caine MHK	Clare Barber MHK	Claire Christian MHK	Jane Poole-Wilson MHK	Tim Crookall MHK	N/A	Chris Thomas MHK	N/A
25/09/2025	Alfred Cannan MHK	David Ashford MHK	Tim Johnston MHK	Daphne Caine MHK	Clare Barber MHK	Claire Christian MHK	Jane Poole-Wilson MHK	Michelle Haywood MHK	N/A	Alex Allinson MHK	N/A
23/11/2024	Alfred Cannan MHK	David Ashford MHK	Tim Johnston MHK	Daphne Caine MHK	Clare Barber MHK	Claire Christian MHK	Jane Poole-Wilson MHK	Michelle Haywood MHK	N/A	Alex Allinson MHK	Tim Crookall MHK
16/10/2024	Alfred Cannan MHK	Kate Lord-Brennan MHK	Tim Johnston MHK	Daphne Caine MHK	Clare Barber MHK	Alfred Cannan MHK	Jane Poole-Wilson MHK	Tim Crookall MHK	N/A	Alex Allinson MHK	N/A
21/02/2024	Alfred Cannan MHK	Kate Lord-Brennan MHK	Tim Johnston MHK	Daphne Caine MHK	Clare Barber MHK	Lawrie Hooper MHK	Jane Poole-Wilson MHK	Tim Crookall MHK	N/A	Alex Allinson MHK	N/A
11/09/2023	Alfred Cannan MHK	Kate Lord-Brennan MHK	Tim Johnston MHK	Julie Edge MHK	Clare Barber MHK	Lawrie Hooper MHK	Jane Poole-Wilson MHK	Tim Crookall MHK	N/A	Alex Allinson MHK	N/A
17/07/2023	Alfred Cannan MHK	Kate Lord-Brennan MHK	Tim Johnston MHK	Julie Edge MHK	Clare Barber MHK	Lawrie Hooper MHK	Jane Poole-Wilson MHK	Alfred Cannan MHK	N/A	Alex Allinson MHK	N/A
14/02/2023	Alfred Cannan MHK	Kate Lord-Brennan MHK	Tim Johnston MHK	Julie Edge MHK	Clare Barber MHK	Lawrie Hooper MHK	Jane Poole-Wilson MHK	Chris Thomas MHK	N/A	Alex Allinson MHK	N/A
10/11/2022	Alfred Cannan MHK	Kate Lord-Brennan MHK	Lawrie Hooper MHK	Julie Edge MHK	Clare Barber MHK	Lawrie Hooper MHK	Jane Poole-Wilson MHK	Chris Thomas MHK	N/A	Alex Allinson MHK	N/A
16/09/2022	Alfred Cannan MHK	Kate Lord-Brennan MHK	Lawrie Hooper MHK	Julie Edge MHK	Clare Barber MHK	Rob Callister MHK	Jane Poole-Wilson MHK	Chris Thomas MHK	N/A	Alex Allinson MHK	N/A
19/07/2022	Alfred Cannan MHK	Kate Lord-Brennan MHK	Alfred Cannan MHK	Julie Edge MHK	Clare Barber MHK	Lawrie Hooper MHK	Jane Poole-Wilson MHK	Chris Thomas MHK	N/A	Alex Allinson MHK	N/A
14/06/2022	Alfred Cannan MHK	Kate Lord-Brennan MHK	Tim Crookall MHK	Julie Edge MHK	Clare Barber MHK	Lawrie Hooper MHK	Jane Poole-Wilson MHK	Chris Thomas MHK	N/A	Alex Allinson MHK	N/A
20/05/2022	Alfred Cannan MHK	Kate Lord-Brennan MHK	Alfred Cannan MHK	Julie Edge MHK	Clare Barber MHK	Lawrie Hooper MHK	Jane Poole-Wilson MHK	Tim Crookall MHK	N/A	Alex Allinson MHK	N/A
15/10/2021	Alfred Cannan MHK	Kate Lord-Brennan MHK	Alex Allinson MHK	Julie Edge MHK	Clare Barber MHK	Lawrie Hooper MHK	Jane Poole-Wilson MHK	Tim Crookall MHK	N/A	David Ashford MHK	N/A
12/10/2021	Alfred Cannan MHK	Howard Quayle MHK	Howard Quayle MHK	Alex Allinson MHK	Geoffrey Boot MHK	David Ashford MHK	Graham Cregeen MHK	Tim Baker MHK	Ray Harmer MHK	Alfred Cannan MHK	N/A
20/07/2021	Howard Quayle MHK	Howard Quayle MHK	Howard Quayle MHK	Alex Allinson MHK	Geoffrey Boot MHK	David Ashford MHK	Graham Cregeen MHK	Tim Baker MHK	Ray Harmer MHK	Alfred Cannan MHK	N/A
03/06/2020	Howard Quayle MHK	Howard Quayle MHK	Laurence Skelly MHK	Alex Allinson MHK	Geoffrey Boot MHK	David Ashford MHK	Graham Cregeen MHK	Tim Baker MHK	Ray Harmer MHK	Alfred Cannan MHK	N/A
27/05/2020	Howard Quayle MHK	Howard Quayle MHK	Laurence Skelly MHK	Alex Allinson MHK	Geoffrey Boot MHK	David Ashford MHK	Graham Cregeen MHK	Ray Harmer MHK	Vacant	Alfred Cannan MHK	N/A
03/03/2020	Howard Quayle MHK	Howard Quayle MHK	Laurence Skelly MHK	Alex Allinson MHK	Geoffrey Boot MHK	David Ashford MHK	Graham Cregeen MHK	Ray Harmer MHK	Chris Thomas MHK	Alfred Cannan MHK	N/A
21/02/2020	Howard Quayle MHK	Howard Quayle MHK	Laurence Skelly MHK	Graham Cregeen MHK	Geoffrey Boot MHK	David Ashford MHK	David Ashford MHK (Note: This was an interim appointment following the death of Bill Malarkey MHK.)	Ray Harmer MHK	Chris Thomas MHK	Alfred Cannan MHK	N/A
08/01/2018	Howard Quayle MHK	Howard Quayle MHK	Laurence Skelly MHK	Graham Cregeen MHK	Geoffrey Boot MHK	David Ashford MHK	Bill Malarkey MHK	Ray Harmer MHK	Chris Thomas MHK	Alfred Cannan MHK	N/A
13/10/2016	Howard Quayle MHK	Howard Quayle MHK	Laurence Skelly MHK	Graham Cregeen MHK	Geoffrey Boot MHK	Kate Beecroft MHK	Bill Malarkey MHK	Ray Harmer MHK	Chris Thomas MHK	Alfred Cannan MHK	N/A
10/10/2016	Howard Quayle MHK	Howard Quayle MHK	Laurence Skelly MHK	Graham Cregeen MHK	Richard Ronan MHK	Kate Beecroft MHK	Bill Malarkey MHK	Ray Harmer MHK	Chris Thomas MHK	Alfred Cannan MHK	N/A
07/10/2016	Howard Quayle MHK	Howard Quayle MHK	Laurence Skelly MHK	Graham Cregeen MHK	Richard Ronan MHK	Howard Quayle MHK	Bill Malarkey MHK	Ray Harmer MHK	Chris Thomas MHK	Alfred Cannan MHK	N/A
04/10/2016	Howard Quayle MHK	Howard Quayle MHK	Laurence Skelly MHK	Tim Crookall MLC (Note: Elevated from the House of Keys to the Legislative Council in June 2015.)	Richard Ronan MHK	Howard Quayle MHK	John Shimmin MHK	Phil Gawne MHK	John Shimmin MHK	Eddie Teare MHK	N/A
28/09/2016	Allan Bell MHK	Allan Bell MHK	Laurence Skelly MHK	Tim Crookall MLC	Richard Ronan MHK	Howard Quayle MHK	John Shimmin MHK	Phil Gawne MHK	John Shimmin MHK	Eddie Teare MHK	N/A
01/01/2016	Allan Bell MHK	Allan Bell MHK	Laurence Skelly MHK	Tim Crookall MLC	Richard Ronan MHK	Howard Quayle MHK	Juan Watterson MHK	Phil Gawne MHK	John Shimmin MHK	Eddie Teare MHK	N/A
16/02/2015 (Note: No Assignment of Ministers Instrument required as the Minister for Policy and Reform is not assigned to a Government department under the Council of Ministers Act 1990.)	Allan Bell MHK	—N/a	Laurence Skelly MHK	Tim Crookall MLC	Richard Ronan MHK	Howard Quayle MHK	Juan Watterson MHK	Phil Gawne MHK	John Shimmin MHK	Eddie Teare MHK	N/A
02/07/2014	Allan Bell MHK	—N/a	Laurence Skelly MHK	Tim Crookall MLC	Richard Ronan MHK	Howard Quayle MHK	Juan Watterson MHK	Phil Gawne MHK	Chris Robertshaw MHK	Eddie Teare MHK	N/A
19/06/2014	Allan Bell MHK	—N/a	Allan Bell MHK	Tim Crookall MLC	Phil Gawne MHK	Howard Quayle MHK	Juan Watterson MHK	Laurence Skelly MHK	Chris Robertshaw MHK	Eddie Teare MHK	N/A
01/04/2014	Allan Bell MHK	—N/a	John Shimmin MHK	Tim Crookall MLC	Phil Gawne MHK	Howard Quayle MHK	Juan Watterson MHK	Laurence Skelly MHK	Chris Robertshaw MHK	Eddie Teare MHK	N/A

=== Structure of the Council of Ministers from 1 April 2010 – 31 March 2014 ===
From	Chief Minister	Minister for								
From	Chief Minister	Community, Culture and Leisure	Economic Development	Education and Children	Environment, Food and Agriculture	Health	Home Affairs	Infrastructure	Social Care	the Treasury
03/03/2014	Allan Bell MHK	Chris Robertshaw MHK	John Shimmin MHK	Tim Crookall MHK	Phil Gawne MHK	Howard Quayle MHK	Juan Watterson MHK	Laurence Skelly MHK	Howard Quayle MHK	Eddie Teare MHK
13/09/2012	Allan Bell MHK	Graham Cregeen MHK	John Shimmin MHK	Tim Crookall MHK	Phil Gawne MHK	David Anderson MHK	Juan Watterson MHK	David Cretney MHK	Chris Robertshaw MHK	Eddie Teare MHK
03/09/2012	Allan Bell MHK	Graham Cregeen MHK	John Shimmin MHK	Tim Crookall MHK	Phil Gawne MHK	David Anderson MHK	John Shimmin MHK	David Cretney MHK	Chris Robertshaw MHK	Eddie Teare MHK
12/07/2012	Allan Bell MHK	Graham Cregeen MHK	John Shimmin MHK	Tim Crookall MHK	Phil Gawne MHK	David Anderson MHK	Juan Watterson MHK	David Cretney MHK	Chris Robertshaw MHK	Eddie Teare MHK
20/06/2012	Allan Bell MHK	Tim Crookall MHK	John Shimmin MHK	David Anderson MHK	Phil Gawne MHK	David Anderson MHK	Juan Watterson MHK	David Cretney MHK	Chris Robertshaw MHK	Eddie Teare MHK
14/10/2011	Allan Bell MHK	Tim Crookall MHK	John Shimmin MHK	Peter Karran MHK	Phil Gawne MHK	David Anderson MHK	Juan Watterson MHK	David Cretney MHK	Chris Robertshaw MHK	Eddie Teare MHK
11/10/2011	Allan Bell MHK	David Cretney MHK	Allan Bell MHK	Eddie Teare MHK	John Shimmin MHK	David Anderson MHK	Adrian Earnshaw MHK	Phil Gawne MHK	Martyn Quayle MHK	Anne Craine MHK
01/04/2010	Tony Brown MHK	David Cretney MHK	Allan Bell MHK	Eddie Teare MHK	John Shimmin MHK	David Anderson MHK	Adrian Earnshaw MHK	Phil Gawne MHK	Martyn Quayle MHK	Anne Craine MHK

1. ^ This was a temporary appointment and Juan Watterson MHK remained a non-assigned minister during the period between 3 and 12 September 2012.
2. ^ This was an interim appointment following the dismissal of Peter Karran MHK.

=== Structure of the Executive Council / Council of Ministers from 16 December 1986 – 31 March 2010 ===
(Note: Prior to 1 October 1990 the Council of Ministers was called the Executive Council.)	Chief Minister	Minister for								
(Note: Prior to 1 October 1990 the Council of Ministers was called the Executive Council.)	Chief Minister	Agriculture, Fisheries and Forestry	Education	Health and Social Security	Home Affairs	Local Government and Environment	Trade and Industry (Note: Formerly the Department of Industry - renamed the Department of Trade and Industry on 1 July 1996 (?).)	Transport (Note: Formerly Department of Highways, Ports and Properties - renamed Department of Transport on 1 January 1995 (?), with the Department's properties function transferring to the Department of Local Government and the Environment.)	the Treasury	Tourism and Leisure (Note: Formerly Department of Tourism and Transport - renamed Department of Tourism, Leisure and Transport on 1 October 1990 (?), and again renamed the Department of Tourism and Leisure on 1 January 1995 (?).)
11/08/2008	Tony Brown MHK	Phil Gawne MHK	Anne Craine MHK	Eddie Teare MHK	Adrian Earnshaw MHK	John Shimmin MHK	David Cretney MHK	David Anderson MHK	Allan Bell MHK	Martyn Quayle MHK
15/12/2006	Tony Brown MHK	Phil Gawne MHK	Anne Craine MHK	Eddie Teare MHK	Martyn Quayle MHK	John Shimmin MHK	David Cretney MHK	David Anderson MHK	Allan Bell MHK	Adrian Earnshaw MHK
01/08/2005	Donald Gelling MLC	Phil Gawne MHK	David Anderson MHK	Steve Rodan MHK	John Shimmin MHK	John Rimmington MHK	Alex Downie MHK	Phil Braidwood MHK	Allan Bell MHK	David Cretney MHK
14/12/2004	Donald Gelling MLC	Bill Henderson MHK	David Anderson MHK	Steve Rodan MHK	Phil Braidwood MHK	John Rimmington MHK	Alex Downie MHK	John Shimmin MHK	Allan Bell MHK	David Cretney MHK
30/06/2004	Richard Corkill MHK	Bill Henderson MHK	David Anderson MHK	Steve Rodan MHK	Phil Braidwood MHK	John Rimmington MHK	Alex Downie MHK	John Shimmin MHK	Allan Bell MHK	David Cretney MHK
06/12/2001	Richard Corkill MHK	John Rimmington MHK	Steve Rodan MHK	Clare Christian MLC	Phil Braidwood MHK	Pam Crowe MLC (Note: Elevated from the House of Keys to the Legislative Council in 2003.)	Alex Downie MHK	John Shimmin MHK	Allan Bell MHK	David Cretney MHK
04/12/2001	Richard Corkill MHK	Alex Downie MHK	Steve Rodan MHK	Clare Christian MLC	Allan Bell MHK	Walter Gilbey MHK	David North MHK	Tony Brown MHK	Richard Corkill MHK	David Cretney MHK
12/05/1999	Donald Gelling MHK	Alex Downie MHK	Steve Rodan MHK	Clare Christian MLC	Allan Bell MHK	Walter Gilbey MHK	David North MHK	Tony Brown MHK	Richard Corkill MHK	David Cretney MHK
06/12/1996	Donald Gelling MHK	Hazel Hannan	Edgar Mann MLC	Clare Christian MLC	Allan Bell MHK	Edgar Quine MHK	David North MHK	Tony Brown MHK	Richard Corkill MHK	David Cretney MHK
06/08/1996	Miles Walker MHK	Hazel Hannan	Noel Cringle MHK	Bernie May MHK	Richard Corkill MHK	Terry Groves MHK	Allan Bell MHK	David North MHK	Donald Gelling MHK	Tony Brown MHK
18/07/1996	Miles Walker MHK	Hazel Hannan	Noel Cringle MHK	Bernie May MHK	Richard Corkill MHK	Terry Groves MHK	Miles Walker MHK	David North MHK	Donald Gelling MHK	Tony Brown MHK
14/12/1995	Miles Walker MHK	Hazel Hannan	Noel Cringle MHK	Bernie May MHK	Richard Corkill MHK	Terry Groves MHK	Edmund Lowey MLC	David North MHK	Donald Gelling MHK	Tony Brown MHK
13/03/1995	Miles Walker MHK	John Corrin MHK	Hazel Hannan MHK	Bernie May MHK	Richard Corkill MHK	Terry Groves MHK	Edmund Lowey MLC	David North MHK	Donald Gelling MHK	Tony Brown MHK
11/10/1994	Miles Walker MHK	John Corrin MHK	Hazel Hannan MHK	Bernie May MHK	Arnold Callin MLC	Terry Groves MHK	Edmund Lowey MLC	David North MHK	Donald Gelling MHK	Tony Brown MHK
13/10/1992	Miles Walker MHK	John Corrin MHK	Hazel Hannan MHK	Bernie May MHK	Arnold Callin MLC	Tony Brown MHK	Edmund Lowey MLC	David North MHK	Donald Gelling MHK	Allan Bell MHK
18/12/1991	Miles Walker MHK	John Corrin MHK	Hazel Hannan MHK	Bernie May MHK	Arnold Callin MLC	Tony Brown MHK	Allan Bell MHK	David North MHK	Donald Gelling MHK	Allan Bell MHK
29/10/1990	Miles Walker MHK	David North MHK	Ron Cretney MHK	Jim Cain MHK	Edmund Lowey MLC	Tony Brown MHK	Bernie May MHK	Arnold Callin MLC	Donald Gelling MHK	Allan Bell MHK
19/12/1989	Miles Walker MHK	David North MHK	Victor Kneale MHK	Jim Cain MHK	Edmund Lowey MLC	Tony Brown MHK	Bernie May MHK	Arnold Callin MLC	Donald Gelling MHK	Allan Bell MHK
27/04/1988	Miles Walker MHK	Donald Gelling MHK	Victor Kneale MHK	Tony Brown MHK	Edmund Lowey MLC	Dominic Delaney MHK	Bernie May MHK	Arnold Callin MLC	David Cannan MHK	Allan Bell MHK
16/12/1986	Miles Walker MHK	Donald Maddrell MHK	Victor Kneale MHK	Tony Brown MHK	Edmund Lowey MLC	Dominic Delaney MHK	Ian Anderson MLC	Arnold Callin MLC	David Cannan MHK	Allan Bell MHK

== See also ==
- Executive Council (Commonwealth countries)
- Executive Council of the Isle of Man
- Isle of Man Government
