= Executive Council of the Isle of Man =

The Executive Council is the former title of the Council of Ministers, the principal executive body of the Isle of Man Government. Its chairman was the Lieutenant Governor until 1980, when he was replaced by a Chairman elected by Tynwald. The Chairman was renamed Chief Minister in 1986, and the council was renamed Council of Ministers in 1990.

The Executive Council was established following the 1949 General Election, "to assist the Lieutenant Governor in the performance of his duties", as successor to an executive committee of Tynwald which was set up in 1946. The Council originally consisted of the two members of the House of Keys and the following five members:

- Chairman of the Board of Agriculture and Fisheries
- Chairman of the Board of Highways and Transport
- Chairman of the Board of Social Services
- Chairman of the Board of Local Government
- Chairman of the Board of Education

== Members ==
Name	Type	Position	Tenure	Replacing
Air Vice Marshal Sir Geoffrey Rhodes Bromet KBE CB DSO DL	Chairman	Lieutenant Governor	1946-1952	N/A
John Cowin MLC	Member	Chairman of the Board of Agriculture and Fisheries	1946-1950	N/A
John Crellin MLC	Member	Chairman of the Local Government Board	1946-1958	N/A
Charles Gill MLC	Member	Chairman of the Highways and Transport Board	1946-1951	N/A
Richard Kneen MHK	Member	Chairman of the Social Services Board	1946-1951	N/A
Alfred Teare MHK	Member	Appointed Member	1946-1958	N/A
George Higgins MHK	Member	Appointed Member	1946-1949	N/A
Second Deemster William Cowley MLC	Member	Appointed Member	1946-1947	N/A
Sir Joseph Davidson Qualtrough CBE	Member	Speaker of the House of Keys	1947-1951	William Cowley
Thomas Cowin MHK	Member	Chairman of the Health Services Board	1949-1955	George Higgins
Richard Cannell MHK	Member	Chairman of the Board of Agriculture and Fisheries	1950-1958	John Cowin
Sir John Bolton MHK	Member	Appointed Member	1951-1962	Charles Gill
Jack Nivison MHK CBE JP	Member	Chairman of the Board of Social Security	1951-1960	Richard Kneen
Henry Corlett MHK CBE JP	Member	Chairmen of the Board of Education	1951-1962	Joseph Davidson Qualtrough
Sir Ambrose Flux Dundas KCIE CSI	Chairman	Lieutenant Governor	1952-1959	Sir Geoffrey Rhodes Bromet
Sir Charles Kerruish MHK	Member; Chairman; Member	Chairman of the Health Services Board; Chairman of the Health Services Board ?	1955-1961; 1961-1966; 1967-1968	Thomas Cowin ? ?
George Higgins MHK	Member	Appointed Member	1958-1958	N/A
Sir Ralph Stevenson MLC	Member	?	1958-1969	?
Howard Simcocks MHK	Member	?	1958-1962	Richard Cannell
George Moore MLC	Member	?	1958-1962	?
Sir Ronald Herbert Garvey KCMG KCVO MBE	Chairman	Lieutenant Governor	1959-1961	Sir Ambrose Flux Dundas
James Cain MHK	Member	Chairman of the Tourism Board	1960-1962	Jack Nivison
Bert Stephen MHK	Member	Chairman of the Finance Board	1962-1964	?
Cecil McFee MLC	Member	?	1962-1966	?
Harold Nicholls MLC	Member	Chairman of the Airports Board	1962-1967	?
William E. Quayle MHK	Member	Chairman of the Tourism Board	1962-1971	James Cain
Hubbert Radcliffe MHK	Member	?	1963-1966	?
Norman Crowe MHK	Member; Chairman; Member	Chairman of the Finance Board; Chairman of the Board of Agriculture and Fisheries ?	1964-1967; 1967-1971; 1971-1978	Bert Stephen ? ?
Edward Kerruish MHK	Member	?	1967-1970	?
Percy Radcliffe MHK	Member; Chairman; Member; Member; Chairman	? Chairman of the Local Government Board ? Chairman of the Finance Board; Chairman of the Executive Council	1967-1971; 1971-1976; 1976-1977; 1977-1981; 1981-1985	? ? ? ? ?
Sir John Bolton MHK	Member	Chairman of the Finance Board ?	1967-1977; 1977-1979	Norman Crowe ?
Clifford Irving MHK	Member; Member; Chairman	? Chairman of the Tourism Board; Chairman of the Tourism Board	1968-1971; 1971-1977; 1977-1981	? ? ?
Jack Nivison MHK CBE JP	Member	Chairman of the Board of Social Security	1969-1972	?
Colin Vereker, 8th Viscount Gort MHK JP	Member	?	1970-1970	?
Victor Kneale MHK	Member	?	1970-1974	?
Howard Simcocks MHK	Member	?	1970-1974	?
Ian Anderson MHK	Member	Chairman of the Police Board; Chairman of the Local Government Board; Chairman of the Home Affairs Board	1971-1976; 1976-1981; 1981-1982	?
Bob Creer MHK	Member	Chairman of the Health Services Board	1975-1977	?
Roy MacDonald MHK	Member	?	1975-1978	?
Alexander Moore MHK	Member	?	1977-1978	?
Bob Creer MHK	Member	?	1978-1982	?
Noel Cringle MHK	Member	Chairmen of the Board of Education	1978-1982	?
Edward Kerruish MLC	Member	?	1978-1985	?
Edgar Mann	Member	Chairman of the Board of Agriculture and Fisheries; Chairman of the Finance Board	1980-1981; 1981-1985	?
Roy MacDonald	Member	Chairman of the Harbour Board	1982-1985	?
Matty Ward	Member	Charman of the Forestry, Mines and Land Board	1982-1985	?
Noel Cringle MHK	Member	Chairman of the Home Affairs Board	1982-1986	Ian Anderson
Miles Walker MHK	Member; Chairman	Chairman of the Local Government Board; Chief Minister	1982-1986; 1986-1990	?
Victor Kneale MHK	Member	Chairmen of the Board of Education; Minister of Education	1982-1986; 1986-1990	?
Ian Anderson MHK	Member	Chairman of the Board of Industry; Minister of Industry	1984-1986; 1986-1988	?
Edgar Mann	Chairman	Chairman of the Executive Council	1985-1986	Already Member
Dr David Moore	Member	Chairman of the Finance Board	1985-1986	?
Norman Radcliffe	Member	Chairman of the Board of Agriculture and Fisheries	1985-1986	?
Arnold Callin	Member	Chairman of the Health Services Board; Minister of Highways, Ports and Properties	1985-1986; 1986-1990	?
Edmund Lowey MHK	Member	Chairman of the Tourism Board; Minister of Home Affairs	1985-1986; 1986-1990	?
Don Maddrell MHK	Member	Minister of Agriculture, Fisheries and Forestry	1986-1988	?
David Cannan MHK	Member	Treasury Minister	1986-1989	?
Dominic Delaney	Member	Minister of Local Government and the Environment	1986-1989	?
Allan Bell MHK	Member	Minister of Tourism and Transport	1986-1990	?
Tony Brown MHK	Member	Minister of Health and Social Security; Minister of Local Government and the Environment	1986-1989; 1989-1990	? Dominic Delaney
Bernie May MHK	Member	Minister of Industry	1988-1990	Ian Anderson
Donald Gelling MHK	Member	Minister of Agriculture, Fisheries and Forestry; Treasury Minister	1988-1989; 1989-1990	Don Maddrell; David Cannan
Jim Cain	Member	Minister of Health and Social Security	1989-1990	Tony Brown
David North	Member	Minister of Agriculture, Fisheries and Forestry	1989-1990	Donald Gelling
Ron Cretney	Member	Minister of Education	1990-1990	Victor Kneale
