= 1986 Manx general election =

General elections were held on the Isle of Man on the 27 November 1986 to elect all 24 members to the island's lower house: the House of Keys. Walter Gilbey was elected unopposed in Glenfaba.

== Electoral system ==
The electoral system was changed in 1982 to single transferable vote with the Representation of the People (Preferential Voting) Act.

== Results ==
Ayre
Candidate	First preferences		Subsequent counts
Candidate	First preferences		2
Edgar Quine	831	48.74	910
Clare Christian	765	44.87	795
Alastair Robertson	109	6.39	
Total	1,705	100.00	1,705
Registered voters/turnout	2,162	–	

Castletown
Candidate	First preferences				
Candidate	First preferences		Tony Brown	995	67.14
Norman Gale	487	32.86			
Total	1,482	100.00			
Registered voters/turnout	2,202	–			

Douglas East
Candidate	First preferences		Subsequent counts					
Candidate	First preferences		2	3	4	5	6	7
Dominic Delaney	859	41.00						
Philip Kermode	252	12.03	288.54	300.62	332.96	737.22	392.66	430.56
Derek Hayes	215	10.26	231.2	252.92	264.46	259.44	335.78	
Martin David	206	9.83	233.54	255.54	275.26	292.42	337.94	404.1
Jim Mitchell	152	7.26	176.12	197.92	224.72	235.44		
Alan Wylie	151	7.21	165.94	175.84	189.74			
Raina Chatel	136	6.49	154	170.54				
John Bell	124	5.92	141.28					
Total	2,095	100.00	1,390.62	1,353.38	1,287.14	1,524.52	1,066.38	834.66
Registered voters/turnout	3,630	–						

Douglas North
Candidate	First preferences		Subsequent counts
Candidate	First preferences		2
Bernie May	1,087	50.44	
Julia Delaney	648	30.07	827.85
Audrey Ainsworth	420	19.49	599.52
Total	2,155	100.00	1,427.37
Registered voters/turnout	3,409	–	

Douglas South
Candidate	First preferences				
Candidate	First preferences		Adrian Duggan	879	41.74
David Cretney	878	41.69			
Roger Watterson	296	14.06			
Arthur Quilliam	53	2.52			
Total	2,106	100.00			
Registered voters/turnout	3,454	–			

Douglas West
Candidate	First preferences		Subsequent counts			
Candidate	First preferences		2	3	4	5
James Cain	945	34.74				
Victor Kneale	632	23.24	643	654	689.92	787.88
Charles Flynn	454	16.69	468	475.8	546.36	680.76
John Christian	397	14.60	410	421.88	476.04	
Basil Callow	130	4.78	133	136		
Richard Kennett	108	3.97	114	117.12		
William Parkinson	54	1.99				
Total	2,720	100.00	1,768	1,804.8	1,712.32	1,468.64
Registered voters/turnout	3,793	–				

Garff
Candidate	First preferences				
Candidate	First preferences		Charles Kerruish	1,113	55.59
Edgar Mann	889	44.41			
Total	2,002	100.00			
Registered voters/turnout	2,550	–			

Malew and Santon
Candidate	First preferences				
Candidate	First preferences		Donald Gelling	695	52.97
John Qualtrough	247	18.83			
Tom Corlett	189	14.41			
Terry Duncan	181	13.80			
Total	1,312	100.00			
Registered voters/turnout	1,856	–			

Michael
Candidate	First preferences				
Candidate	First preferences		David Cannan	946	75.62
Michael James	156	12.47			
Derek Ellison	149	11.91			
Total	1,251	100.00			
Registered voters/turnout	1,722	–			

Middle
Candidate	First preferences		Subsequent counts	
Candidate	First preferences		2	3
Brian Barton	495	37.99	624	750
Brian Hampton	391	30.01	426	583
Paul Irving	305	23.41	353	
Albert Kelly	112	8.60		
Total	1,303	100.00	1,403	1,333
Registered voters/turnout	2,108	–		

Onchan
Candidate	First preferences		Subsequent counts		
Candidate	First preferences		2	3	4
Peter Karran	1,075	28.08			
Richard Leventhorpe	916	23.92	965		
Donald Maddrell	766	20.01	772	812.3	1,048.3
Fred Griffin	508	13.27	525	550	731
Roger Payne	477	12.46	492	530.8	
Frank Crompton	87	2.27			
Total	3,829	100.00	2,754	1,893.1	1,779.3
Registered voters/turnout	5,732	–			

Peel
Candidate	First preferences		Subsequent counts					
Candidate	First preferences		2	3	4	5	6	7
Hazel Hannan	664	31.76	671	704	734	762	857	1,002
Fred Crowe	361	17.26	367	407	475	506	537	639
Grant McPherson	358	17.12	366	379	389	431	512	
Malcolm Hartley	249	11.91	257	273	285	322		
Maurice Felton	147	7.03	154	160	169			
Stephen Pitts	140	6.70	140	147				
Eric Kelly	63	3.01	70					
Jackie Wade	63	3.01	66					
Robert Quayle	46	2.20						
Total	2,091	100.00	2,091	2,070	2,052	2,021	1,906	1,641
Registered voters/turnout	2,670	–						

Ramsey
Candidate	First preferences		Subsequent counts			
Candidate	First preferences		2	3	4	5
Allan Bell	1,212	41.84				
Norman Butler	755	26.06	840.6	852.4	875.6	889
Lionel Morrey	397	13.70	451	458.3	482.4	506.4
Percy Quirk	212	7.32	237.4	247.2	277.8	301
Robert Cowley	140	4.83	156.8	162.6		
Paul Lebiedzinski	113	3.90	154.6	186.2	224.6	
John Skinner	68	2.35	87			
Total	2,897	100.00	1,927.4	1,906.7	1,860.4	1,696.4
Registered voters/turnout	4,492	–				

Rushen
Candidate	First preferences		Subsequent counts						
Candidate	First preferences		2	3	4	5	6	7	8
Miles Walker	1,089	27.16							
John Orme	701	17.49	711.78	736.99	774.69	821.97	881.16	956.119	1,087.59
John Corrin	485	12.10	493.26	505.74	530.75	547.03	584.45	649.22	780.04
Cecil Price	436	10.88	443.77	466.12	477.47	517.24	544.38	587.5	
Noel Cringle	398	9.93	427.96	450.1	466.59	483.29	509.78	593.72	685.89
Ronald Corrin	290	7.23	298.33	311.89	334.24	361.52	405.43		
James Hall	179	4.46	182.99	186.2	208.41	233.62			
Roderick Skinner	173	4.32	175.66	183.73	193.94				
Tony Gunn	141	3.52	143.66	154.73					
John Gill	63	1.57	63.98						
Peter Ray	54	1.35	54.84						
Total	4,009	100.00	2,996.23	2,995.5	2,986.09	2,964.67	2,925.2	2,786.559	2,553.52
Registered voters/turnout	5,581	–							
