= Department of Health and Social Care (Isle of Man) =

Isle of Man government ministerial department

Department overview
- Formed: 1 April 2014
- Preceding agencies: Department of Health and Department of Social Care; Department of Health and Social Security
- Jurisdiction: Isle of Man
- Headquarters: Belgravia House, Circular Road, Douglas, Isle of Man
- Annual budget: 2023/24 Gross Income £53,724,000 Gross Expenditure £313,780,000, Net Expenditure £260,056,000
- Minister responsible: Alfred Cannan (Interim) MHK, Minister for Health and Social Care
- Department executive: Paul Richardson, Chief Officer
- Website: www.gov.im/dhsc

The Department of Health and Social Care (Manx: Rheynn Slaynt as Kiarail y Theay) is the largest (by number of personnel and budget) of the seven departments of the Isle of Man Government. It was created on 1 April 2014 as a result of a merger of health and social care services from the former Department of Health and Department of Social Care. The intention to merge the two Departments was announced on 2 December 2013 as part of the Council of Ministers' plans to modernise ministerial government. The move was by and large a reversal of one element of the restructuring of the Isle of Man Government in April 2010 which saw the former Department of Health and Social Security split to form the Department of Health and the Department of Social Care.

== Functions ==
- Acute Care
  - Noble’s Hospital
  - Referral to tertiary centres in the UK
- Community Care
  - Primary Health Care
  - Mental Health Care
  - Adult Social Care
  - Children and Families Social Care
- Public Health

== Current and previous Ministers and Members ==
=== Ministers for Health and Social Care (1 April 2014 - present) ===
- (Interim) Alfred Cannan MHK, October 2024 – present
- Lawrie Hooper MHK, November 2022 – October 2024
- Rob Callister MHK, September 2022-November 2022
- Lawrie Hooper MHK, October 2021–September 2022
- David Ashford MHK, 8 January 2018 - October 2021
- Kate Beecroft MHK, October 2016 - 4 January 2018
- Hon Howard Quayle MHK, 1 April 2014 – October 2016

=== Former Ministers for Health (1 April 2010 - 31 March 2014) ===
- Hon Howard Quayle MHK, 3–31 March 2014.
- Hon David Anderson MHK, 1 April 2010 – 3 March 2014.

=== Former Ministers for Social Care (1 April 2010 - 31 March 2014) ===
- Hon Howard Quayle MHK, 3–31 March 2014.
- Hon Chris Robertshaw MHK, 14 October 2011 – 3 March 2014.
- Hon Martyn Quayle MHK, 1 April 2010 – 14 October 2011.

=== Former Ministers for Health and Social Security (16 December 1986 - 31 March 2010) ===
- Hon Eddie Teare MHK, 15 December 2006 - 31 March 2010.
- Hon Steve Rodan MHK, 30 June 2004 - 15 December 2006.
- Hon Clare Christian MLC, 6 December 1996 - 30 June 2004.
- Hon Bernie May MHK, 18 December 1991 - 6 December 1996.
- Hon Jim Cain MHK, 19 December 1989 - 18 December 1991.
- Hon Tony Brown MHK, 16 December 1986 - 19 December 1989.

=== Former Chairmen of the Department of Health and Social Security (1 April 1986 - 16 December 1986) ===
- Arnold Callin MHK, 1 April 1986 - 16 December 1986.

=== Former Chairmen of the Health Services Board ===
- Arnold Callin MHK, 15 December 1981 - 31 March 1986.
- Bert Creer MHK, 1975 - 15 December 1981.
- Unknown 1971 - 1975.
- Cecil McFee MHK, 1967 - 1971.
- Sir Charles Kerruish MHK, 1955 - 1967.
- Thomas Cowin MHK, 6 July 1948 - 1955.

=== Former Members for Health ===
- Bill Henderson MHK - Member for Mental Health Services, 7 May 2013 - 3 March 2014.
- Leonard Singer MHK - Member for Mental Health Services, 1 August 2012 - 7 May 2013.
- Dudley Butt MLC - Member for Health Services, 1 April 2010 – 31 March 2014.
