= Department of Health (Isle of Man) =

Department overview
- Formed: 1 April 2010
- Preceding Department: Department of Health and Social Security
- Dissolved: 31 March 2014
- Superseding Department: Department of Health and Social Care
- Jurisdiction: Isle of Man
- Headquarters: Crookall House, Demesne Road, Douglas, Isle of Man

The Department of Health (Manx: Rheynn Slaynt) was a department of the Isle of Man Government. It was created on 1 April 2010, taking on the health services and public health functions of the former Department of Health and Social Security. On 1 August 2012 the Isle of Man's Mental Health Services were transferred from the Department of Social Care to the Department of Health, which also saw the creation of a post for a second Member for the Department with specific responsibility for Mental Health. On 2 December 2013 as part of the Council of Ministers' plans to modernize ministerial government it was announced that the Department of Health and the Department of Social Care (with the exception of Social Security, which would move to Treasury) would merge on 1 April, subject to the approval of Tynwald. The move was by and large a reversal of one element of the restructuring of the Isle of Man Government in April 2010 which saw the former Department of Health and Social Security split to form the Department of Health and the Department of Social Care.

During its existence, the Department of Health was the largest in terms of personnel, which is estimated to stand at 1,983.51 full-time equivalent employees at 31 March 2014, representing approx. 25% of central government's public sector workforce.

== Functions ==
- Acute Care
- Primary Care
- Public Health
- Mental Health
- Nurse and Medical Education and Training

== Former Ministers and Members ==
=== Former Ministers for Health ===
- Hon Howard Quayle MHK, 3 March 2014 - 31 March 2014.
- Hon David Anderson MHK, 1 April 2010 – 3 March 2014.

=== Former Ministers for Health and Social Security (16 December 1968 - 31 March 2010) ===
- Hon Eddie Teare MHK, 15 December 2006 - 31 March 2010.
- Hon Steve Rodan MHK, 30 June 2004 - 15 December 2006.
- Hon Clare Christian MLC, 6 December 1996 - 30 June 2004.
- Hon Bernie May MHK, 18 December 1991 - 6 December 1996.
- Hon Jim Cain MHK, 19 December 1989 - 18 December 1991.
- Hon Tony Brown MHK, 16 December 1986 - 19 December 1989.

=== Former Chairmen of the Department of Health and Social Security (1 April 1986 - 16 December 1986) ===
- Arnold Callin MHK, 1 April 1986 - 16 December 1986.

Health functions were part of the Department of Health and Social Security prior to the formation of the Department for Health on 1 April 2010.

=== Former Chairmen of the Health Services Board ===
- Arnold Callin MHK, 15 December 1981 - 31 March 1986.
- Bert Creer MHK, 1975 - 15 December 1981.
- Unknown 1971 - 1975.
- Cecil McFee MHK, 1967 - 1971.
- Sir Charles Kerruish MHK, 1955 - 1967.
- Thomas Cowin MHK, 6 July 1948 - 1955.

=== Former Members for Health ===
- Bill Henderson MHK - Member for Mental Health Services, 7 May 2013 - 3 March 2014.
- Dudley Butt MLC - Member for Health Services, 1 April 2010 – 31 March 2014.
- Leonard Singer MHK - Member for Mental Health Services, 1 August 2012 - 7 May 2013.
