= Department of Social Care (Isle of Man) =

Department overview
- Formed: 1 April 2010
- Preceding Department: Various functions from the Department of Health and Social Security and Department of Local Government and the Environment
- Dissolved: 31 March 2014
- Superseding Department: Department of Health and Social Care
- Jurisdiction: Isle of Man
- Headquarters: Markwell House, Market Street, Douglas, Isle of Man

The Department of Social Care (Manx: Rheynn Kiarail y Theay) was a department of the Isle of Man Government. It was created on 1 April 2010, taking on the social services and social security functions of the former Department of Health and Social Security as well as the social housing function of the former Department of Local Government and the Environment. On 2 December 2013 as part of the Council of Ministers' plans to modernize ministerial government it was announced that the Department of Health and the Department of Social Care (with the exception of Social Security, which would move to Treasury) would merge on 1 April, subject to the approval of Tynwald. The move was by and large a reversal of one element of the restructuring of the Isle of Man Government in April 2010 which saw the former Department of Health and Social Security split to form the Department of Health and the Department of Social Care.

During its existence, the Department of Social Care was the largest department of the Isle of Man Government in terms of budget.

== Functions ==
- Social Services
- Social Security Scheme
- National Insurance
- Housing: Regulation, Public Sector Housing, First and Second Time Buyer Housing
- Regulation of Care Homes

== Ministers responsible for Social Care ==
=== Ministers for Social Care (1 April 2010 - 31 March 2014) ===
- Hon Howard Quayle MHK, 3 March 2014 - 31 March 2014.
- Hon Chris Robertshaw MHK, 14 October 2011 – 3 March 2014.
- Hon Martyn Quayle MHK, 1 April 2010 – 14 October 2011.

=== Former Ministers for Health and Social Security (16 December 1968 - 31 March 2010) ===
- Hon Eddie Teare MHK, 15 December 2006 - 31 March 2010.
- Hon Steve Rodan MHK, 30 June 2004 - 15 December 2006.
- Hon Clare Christian MLC, 6 December 1996 - 30 June 2004.
- Hon Bernie May MHK, 18 December 1991 - 6 December 1996.
- Hon Jim Cain MHK, 19 December 1989 - 18 December 1991.
- Hon Tony Brown MHK, 16 December 1986 - 19 December 1989.

=== Former Chairmen of the Department of Health and Social Security (1 April 1986 - 16 December 1986) ===
- Arnold Callin MHK, 1 April 1986 - 16 December 1986.

=== Chairmen of the Board of Social Security (1970-1986) ===
- unknown, 1970-1986

=== Chairmen of the Board of Social Services (?-1970) ===
- Jack Nivison MHK, 1951-1976
- unknown, ?-1951
