= Tony Brown (Manx politician) =

Manx politician (born 1950)

Chief Minister of the Isle of Man
- In office 14 December 2006 – 11 October 2011
- Monarch: Elizabeth II
- Lieutenant Governor: Paul Haddacks; Adam Wood
- Preceded by: Donald Gelling
- Succeeded by: Allan Bell

Personal details
- Born: James Anthony Brown; 5 January 1950 (age 75); Castletown, Isle of Man
- Political party: Independent
- Spouse: Rachel Smith (m. 1979)
- Children: 1 son, 1 daughter
- Profession: Politician, electrician, businessman

James Anthony Brown OBE (born 5 January 1950) is a Manx politician and businessman who was the Chief Minister of the Isle of Man from 2006 until October 2011, when he stepped down from office following his decision to retire.

== Early life and career ==
Born on 5 January 1950, Brown was educated at Victoria Road Primary, Castletown and Castle Rushen High School and has since been an electrician, being the proprietor of Tony Brown Electrics in Castletown until its closure in 2010. He was elected as a member of Castletown Commissioners in 1976, becoming chairman in 1980 before being elected as the Castletown MHK in 1981 at his first attempt. In 2000, he was defeated in his attempt to become Speaker of the House of Keys by David Cannan but instead became the Deputy Speaker. Following the 2001 General Election, he was elected Speaker and in January 2002, Deputy President of Tynwald.

He was re-elected in November 2006 as MHK, beating Roy Redmayne by 915 votes to 335. He was again elected Speaker of the House of Keys after the general election in 2006. There was a great deal of rumour that he might run for Chief Minister, but when nominations were put forward his name was not on the list. Then followed an unsuccessful round of voting with neither Steve Rodan, John Shimmin nor David Cannan being elected. Nominations then reopened, with Tony Brown being the only candidate put forward. His nomination was confirmed by Tynwald on Thursday, 14 December 2006 receiving 27 votes and the Lieutenant Governor appointed him Chief Minister later in the day. He then resigned the Speakership of the House of Keys as required by law.

Brown was appointed Officer of the Order of the British Empire (OBE) in the 2013 Birthday Honours for public and political service.

Brown returned to politics 14 years after retirement topping the polls in the Castletown Commissioners election 2025. He was subsequently elected to Chair of the Commissioners.

== Personal life ==
Brown was married to Rachel (née Smith) since 1979 until her death in 2022. They had 2 children together and lived in Brown's hometown of Castletown.

== Governmental positions ==
- Minister of Health and Social Security, 1986–89
- Minister of Local Government and the Environment, 1989–94
- Minister of Tourism and Leisure, 1994–96
- Minister of Transport, 1996–2001
- Chief Minister, 2006–11

== Brown Council ==
Office	Name	Term
Chief Minister	Tony Brown	14 December 2006 – 11 October 2011
Minister for the Treasury	Allan Bell	6 December 2001 – 31 March 2010
	Annie Craine	1 April 2010 – October 2011
Minister for Home Affairs	Martyn Quayle	15 December 2006 – 11 August 2008
	Adrian Earnshaw	11 August 2008 – October 2011
Minister for Health and Social Security / Minister for Health	Eddie Teare	15 December 2006 – 31 March 2010
	David Anderson	1 April 2010 – October 2011
Minister for Education / Minister for Education and Children	Annie Craine	15 December 2006 – 31 March 2010
	Eddie Teare	1 April 2010 – October 2011
Minister for Trade and Industry	David Cretney	15 December 2006 – 31 March 2010
Minister of Economic Development	Allan Bell	1 April 2010 – October 2011
Minister for Tourism and Leisure	Adrian Earnshaw	15 December 2006 – 11 August 2008
	Martyn Quayle	11 August 2008 – 31 March 2010
Minister for Transport	David Anderson	15 December 2006 – 31 March 2010
Minister for Agriculture, Fisheries and Forestry	Phil Gawne	1 August 2005 – 31 March 2010
Minister for Local Government and the Environment	John Shimmin	15 December 2006 – 31 March 2010
Minister for Community, Culture and Leisure	David Cretney	1 April 2010 – October 2011
Minister for Infrastructure	Phil Gawne	1 April 2010 – October 2011
Minister for Environment, Food and Agriculture	John Shimmin	1 April 2010 – October 2011
Minister for Social Care	Martyn Quayle	1 April 2010 – October 2011

Political offices
Preceded by Donald Gelling	Chief Minister of the Isle of Man; 2006–11	Succeeded by Allan Bell
