= Department of Health and Social Security (Isle of Man) =

Department overview
- Formed: 1 April 1986
- Dissolved: 31 March 2010
- Superseding Department: Department of Health and Department of Social Care
- Jurisdiction: Isle of Man
- Headquarters: Markwell House, Market Street, Douglas, Isle of Man

The Department of Health and Social Security (Manx: Rheynn Slaynt as Shickyrys Y Theay) or DHSS provided healthcare (hospitals, doctors, dentistry, ambulance service), social services (mental health, social workers, and residential care), and social security (state pensions, child benefit, sickness benefit, and Jobseeker's Allowance).

Prior to the separation of its component parts on 1 April 2010, the DHSS was the largest employer on the Isle of Man, with over 3,000 members of staff. The DHSS was largely replaced by two new Departments, the Department of Health and the Department of Social Care, with some Social Security functions transferring to the Isle of Man Treasury.

== History ==
The original Department of Health and Social Security was formed by the merger of the Health Services Board and the Board of Social Security in 1986. Its first CEO was Ken Tomlinson who was replaced on 2 June 2003 by David Killip, who was formerly the CEO of the Department of Home Affairs.

From 1 April 2010, along with most other Isle of Man Government departments, the former DHSS was subject to major restructuring which saw the Department cease to exist, being replaced entirely by the separate Departments of Health and Social Care. Ministerial and political membership changes saw David Anderson MHK become Minister for Health, aided by Dudley Butt MLC as political member for Health. David Killip, former DHSS CEO, remained with the Department of Health. Martyn Quayle MHK became Minister for Social Care and Chris Corlett, previously CEO of the Department of Trade and Industry, became CEO of the Department of Social Care.

=== Former Ministers for Health and Social Security (16 December 1968 - 31 March 2010) ===
- Hon Eddie Teare MHK, 15 December 2006 - 31 March 2010.
- Hon Steve Rodan MHK, 30 June 2004 - 15 December 2006.
- Hon Clare Christian MLC, 6 December 1996 - 30 June 2004.
- Hon Bernie May MHK, 18 December 1991 - 6 December 1996.
- Hon Jim Cain MHK, 19 December 1989 - 18 December 1991.
- Hon Tony Brown MHK, 16 December 1986 - 19 December 1989.

=== Former Chairmen of the Department of Health and Social Security (1 April 1986 - 16 December 1986) ===
- Arnold Callin MHK, 1 April 1986 - 16 December 1986.

=== Chairmen of the Health Services Board (1954-1986) ===
- Arnold Callin MHK, 15 December 1981 - 31 March 1986.
- Bert Creer, MHK, 1975-1981
- Cecil McFee, MHK, ?-?
- Sir Charles Kerruish SHK, 1954-?

=== Chairmen of the Board of Social Security (1970-1986) ===
- see Department of Social Care
