= Health Services Board =

The Health Services Board was a former statutory board of the Isle of Man Government. It existed from 1954 to 1986 when it was merged with the Board of Social Security to form the Department of Health and Social Security (Isle of Man).

== Chairmen of the Health Services Board (1954-1986) ==
- Arnold Callin MHK, 15 December 1981 – 31 March 1986.
- Bert Creer, MHK, 1975–1981
- Cecil McFee, MHK
- Sir Charles Kerruish SHK, 1954–?
