= Ray Harmer =

Manx politician

The Honourable Ray Harmer

Minister for Policy and Reform
- Incumbent
- Assumed office 3 June 2020
- Chief Minister: Alfred Cannan
- Preceded by: Chris Thomas

Minister for Infrastructure
- In office 9 October 2016 – 3 June 2020
- Preceded by: Phil Gawne
- Succeeded by: Tim Baker

Member of the House of Keys for Glenfaba and Peel
- Incumbent
- Assumed office 22 September 2016

Member of the House of Keys for Peel
- In office 11 September 2015 – 21 September 2016
- Succeeded by: Constituency Abolished

Member of Peel Town Commissioners
- In office 9 December 2009 – 12 September 2015

Personal details
- Born: 1967 (age 58–59)
- Party: Independent
- Spouse: Adele Harmer
- Children: 1
- Education: University of Cambridge

Raymond Karl Harmer is a former Member of the House of Keys for Glenfaba & Peel in the Isle of Man, and the current Minister for Policy and Reform.

In 2015, he was elected an MHK in a by-election for Peel. In the 2016 general election, he contested the merged constituency of Glenfaba & Peel and was elected.

He was elected in the 2025 Manx local elections.

== Governmental positions ==
- Member, Department of Health and Social Care 2015–2016
- Member, Department of Infrastructure 2015–2016
- Minister for Infrastructure 2016–2020
- Minister for Policy and Reform 2020–present

=== 2015 ===
2015 By-Election: Peel
Party	Candidate	Votes	%
Independent	Ray Harmer	799	45.14%
Independent	Leslie Hanson	616	34.8%
Independent	Penelope Hardman	325	18.36%
Independent	Anthony Downall	30	34.8%
Total valid votes		1770	
Rejected ballots		7	0.45%
Turnout		1770	

=== 2016 ===
In 2014, Tynwald approved recommendations from the Boundary Review Commission which saw the reform of the Island's electoral boundaries.

Under the new system, the Island was divided into 12 constituencies based on population, with each area represented by two members of the House of Keys.

As a result, Peel's electoral boundaries were changed significantly to include the surrounding parishes of German and Patrick. These parishes had previously formed the constituency of Glenfaba.

2016 Manx General Election: Glenfaba and Peel
Party	Candidate	Votes	%
Independent	Raymond Harmer	2195	41.91%
Independent	Geoffrey Boot	1805	34.46%
Independent	Leslie Hanson	1238	23.63%
Total valid votes		5238	
Rejected ballots		24	0.73%
Registered electors		5,886	
Turnout		3309	56.22%

== Public service ==
- Peel Commissioner
- Treasurer of Peel Heritage Trust
