= Civil Aviation Administration (Isle of Man) =

Division of the government of the Isle of Man

Isle of Man Civil Aviation Administration
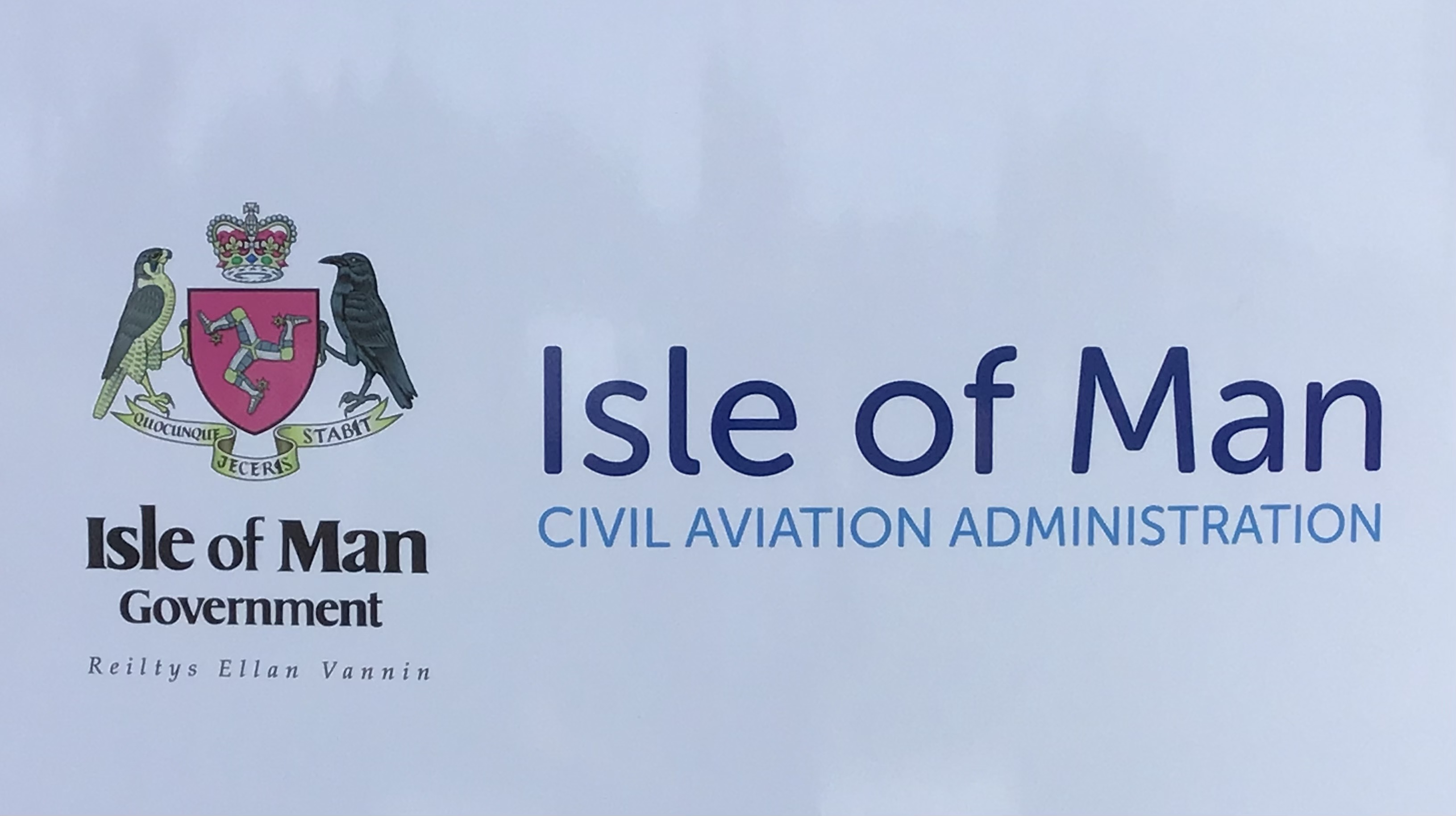
- Abbreviation: IOM CAA
- Formation: 2007
- Purpose: Aviation regulator
- Location: Headquarters: Viscount House, Ronaldsway Airport, Ballasalla, Isle of Man. IM9 2AS
- Region served: Isle of Man
- Director of Civil Aviation: Simon Williams
- Parent organization: Department for Enterprise
- Website: iomaircraftregistry.com

The Isle of Man Civil Aviation Administration (IOM CAA) is the division of the Isle of Man Government's Department for Enterprise that is responsible for regulating aviation safety and security in the Isle of Man. The Isle of Man Civil Aviation Administration's Headquarters are situated at Ronaldsway Airport and the current Director of Civil Aviation is Simon Williams.

== Responsibilities ==
The IOM CAA also administers the Isle of Man Aircraft Registry and is responsible for ensuring aviation legislation in the Isle of Man meets International Civil Aviation Organization (ICAO) Standards and Recommended Practices in addition to other relevant European aviation standards.

The IOM CAA is responsible for the development and application of the Isle of Man's aviation safety and security regulations, policies, procedures and ICAO compliance. Part of the IOM CAA's remit is to ensure appropriate day to day safety and security oversight of the Island's aviation activities. In addition to this the IOM CAA also regulates the Isle of Man's Airport.
