= LRQA Group =

LRQA Group Limited
- Formerly: Lloyd's Register Quality Assurance
- Industry: Risk management, Certification and inspection
- Founded: 1985; 41 years ago
- Headquarters: Birmingham, England
- Key people: Ian Spaulding (CEO)
- Revenue: £483 million (2025, pro forma)
- Number of employees: 3,500+ (2025)
- Website: www.lrqa.com

LRQA Group Limited is a British risk management and assurance company headquartered in Birmingham, England. The company was founded in 1985 as Lloyd's Register Quality Assurance, a subsidiary of Lloyd's Register. Lloyd's Register sold the business to funds managed by Goldman Sachs Alternatives in 2021.

== History ==
Lloyd's Register of Shipping established Lloyd's Register Quality Assurance in 1985 to assess the quality management systems of other organizations, and the subsidiary went on to certify companies against the ISO 9000 standards. It was incorporated in England on 21 January 1985. Roderick MacLeod, chairman and chief executive of Lloyd's Register from 1983 to 1993, was credited in his obituary with pioneering the venture. A 2002 doctoral study of the British quality consultancy market identified LRQA and BSI Quality Assurance as the assessors that registered most medium and large manufacturers in the early waves of ISO 9000 certification.

By 2021, the business operated as Lloyd's Register's Business Assurance & Inspection Services division, which also included the cyber security company Nettitude.

In April 2022, LRQA acquired ELEVATE, a Hong Kong-based supply chain sustainability and risk management firm, from EQT Private Equity. During 2025 and 2026, it acquired RESET Carbon, Core Business Solutions, EcoEngineers, and Partner Africa. As of March 2026, funds managed by Goldman Sachs Alternatives held an 83% equity stake in LRQA, with management holding the remaining 17%. In June 2026, Hillhouse Investment acquired a minority stake in the company from Goldman Sachs Alternatives.

== Operations ==
LRQA operated in about 150 countries. In 2025, assessment and certification accounted for 52% of revenue and inspection for 28%; pro forma revenue for the year was £483 million, and the company had more than 3,500 employees.

LRQA also acts as a conformity assessment body for the Marine Stewardship Council's fisheries certification. In early 2026, its draft assessment recommended recertifying the Antarctic krill fishery operated by Aker QRILL for five years, a recommendation that the Antarctic and Southern Ocean Coalition and WWF opposed and that the coalition formally challenged.
