= Lord Brennan =

Lord Brennan may refer to:

- Daniel Brennan, Baron Brennan (born 1942), English barrister
- Kevin Brennan, Baron Brennan of Canton (born 1959), Welsh Labour Party politician

== See also ==
- Kate Lord-Brennan, Manx politician
