= Clare Barber =

Manx politician

Clare Barber MHK

Minister for Environment Food and Agriculture
- In office 15 October 2021 – 16 October 2026
- Succeeded by: Rachel Glover MHK

Member of the House of Keys for Douglas East
- In office 22 September 2016 – 24 September 2026

Personal details
- Party: Independent

Clare Louise Barber is a Manx politician. She was a Member of the House of Keys (MHK) for Douglas East from 2016 until 2026.

== Career ==
She was re-elected in the 2021 Manx general election. She serves as Minister for Environment, Food and Agriculture.

== Elections ==
2016 Manx General Election: Douglas East
Party	Candidate	Votes	%
Independent	Clare Bettison	692	18.06%
Independent	Chris Robertshaw	487	1.55%
Independent	John Joughin	480	15.45%
Independent	Quentin Gill	415	13.36%
Independent	Amanda Walker	373	12.02%
Independent	Catherine Turner	324	10.43%
Independent	John McBride	303	9.76%
Manx Labour Party	Richard Halsall	163	5.25%
Total valid votes		1705	
Rejected ballots		4	0.12%
Registered electors		4251	
Turnout		1705	40.11%

2021 Manx General Election: Douglas East
Party	Candidate	Votes	%
Manx Labour Party	Joney Faragher	741	23.87%
Independent	Clare Barber	692	22.29%
Liberal Vannin Party	Michael Josem	508	16.37%
Independent	John Joughin	477	15.37%
Independent	Peter Gilmore	313	10.08%
Independent	Amanda Walker	217	6.99%
Independent	Christine Urquhart	152	4.9%
Total valid votes		1772	
Rejected ballots		4	0.23%
Registered electors		4,891	
Turnout		1772	47.74%

2026 Manx General Election: Douglas East
Party	Candidate	Votes	%
Independent	Andrew Saunders	820	27.26%
Manx Labour Party	Joney Faragher	682	22.67%
Independent	Dave Mackay	632	21.01%
Independent	Clare Barber	543	18.05%
Change Isle of Man	Andrew Forster	331	11%
Total valid votes		3008	
Rejected ballots		4	0.13%
Registered electors		4,938	
Turnout		1700	34.43%

== See also ==
- List of members of the House of Keys, 2016–2021
- List of members of the House of Keys, 2021–2026
