= Quintin Gill =

British politician (born 1959)

- Born: Quintin Bennett Gill; 27 November 1959 (age 66); Blackburn, Lancashire, England
- Occupation: Politician
- Years active: 1990–present
- Employer: Isle of Man Government
- Spouse: Joy McCaffrey (m. 1989)
- Children: 3

Quintin Bennett Gill (born 27 November 1959) is a Manx politician, who was a Member of the House of Keys (the lower house of parliament of the Isle of Man) for Rushen between 2001 and 2011.

He had been elected twice: in November 2001 (his first attempt) and in November 2006, before losing his seat in the September 2011 election, to Independent challenger Laurence Skelly. Before he was a politician, he was a social worker and a probation officer. Gill was the chairman of the Manx Electricity Authority until 2011.

== Governmental and parliamentary positions (selection) ==
- Chairman of the Isle of Man Office of Fair Trading, 2004–08
- Chairman of the Manx Electricity Authority, 2008–11
- Political Member of various government departments, 2002–11
- Deputy Speaker of the House of Keys, 2010–11

== Personal life ==
Gill has been married to Joy (née McCaffrey) since 1989, they have three daughters together and live in Port St Mary, Isle of Man.
