= Isle of Man Treasury =

Department of the Isle of Man Government

Department of the Treasury
Department overview
- Formed: 1986
- Preceding Department: Finance Board
- Jurisdiction: Isle of Man
- Headquarters: Government Office, Buck's Road, Douglas, Isle of Man
- Employees: 339
- Annual budget: GBP 18.9m for 2011-2012
- Minister responsible: Mr Chris Thomas MHK, Treasury Minister
- Department executive: Caldric Randall, Chief Financial Officer
- Website: www.gov.im/treasury

Footnotes
- Bonds: (LSE: 41OY); (LSE: 57QI)

The Treasury (Manx: Yn Tashtey) of the Isle of Man is the finance department of the Isle of Man Government. It prepares the annual budget for the Government, and also handles taxation, customs and excise, economic affairs, information systems, internal audit, currency and the census in the Isle of Man.

The incumbent Minister for the Treasury is Chris Thomas MHK.

== History ==
The Finance Board was established in 1962, although the Lieutenant Governor of the Isle of Man functioned as Chancellor of the Exchequer and gave the budget speech in Tynwald until the 1970s.

From 1765 to 1979, the collection of customs revenues in the Isle of Man was undertaken by UK Customs and Excise staff. From 1980, under the terms of the Customs and Excise Agreement of 1979 with the UK, the collection of customs revenue has been undertaken by Manx civil servants. The current Customs and Excise Agreement covers customs duties and many other (but not all) indirect taxes. The agreement, which is backed by both UK and Manx legislation, means that for VAT, customs and most (but not all) excise duty purposes the two territories are treated as one. Most of these indirect taxes and duties are pooled and shared. This negates the need for customs barriers between the two countries. Manx legislation exists which mirrors the equivalent UK law where required.

== Functions ==
- Budget
- Taxation
- National Insurance
- Investments and Banking
- Economic Advice and Statistical Analysis
- Capital Projects Unit
- Internal Audit
- Pay and Payments
- Insolvency Office
- Rates
- Valuations

== Isle of Man Customs and Excise ==
Customs and Excise operates from Douglas, near the steam railway station, with about 55 staff covering all aspects of Customs and Excise work. There are about 9,000 traders currently registered for VAT in the Isle of Man and this figure is steadily growing. On average more than 100 new applications to register are received per month. The service aims to register new traders within 7 days of application, provided all the relevant information has been provided.

Customs and Excise Division also has important law enforcement functions to perform, ranging from the investigation of local customs offences such as bootlegging of alcohol and tobacco and drug smuggling into and out of the Isle of Man through to assisting other jurisdictions with the investigation of international money laundering.

In the area of financial crime the Division works closely with the Financial Intelligence Unit (FIU) and currently there are intelligence officers and investigation officers working with their police colleagues at the FIU.

The Division's law enforcement work contributes to the Chief Minister's Drug and Alcohol Strategy, which complements its performance of the more traditional customs work including attendance at ports and the airport, dealing with passengers, examining freight, courier and postal packets, road fuel testing and excise visiting. In most of these areas officers seek to seize offending items and to disrupt those that try to bring into the island prohibited or restricted goods, which include drugs, alcohol, tobacco, weapons, paedophile materials and endangered species or meat products. Where prohibitions are broken the division has close working and intelligence sharing with the Isle of Man Constabulary.

The Division also operates a 7.5 metre trailer based rigid-hulled inflatable boat (RHIB) bought using the seized proceeds of illegal activities.

Previously the Division had a cutter Panther, but it was gifted to Sierra Leone to be used for fisheries enforcement.

In addition to its customs role relating to import and export prohibitions and restrictions, the Division is responsible for administration of export licensing and export controls, these being in addition to controls on the removal of cultural items administered by Manx National Heritage. It is also responsible for administering UN and EU sanctions, both trade-based and financial sanctions.

Below is a list of Assigned matters to the Division:

- Agricultural imports, controls Agency function on behalf of DEFA
- Air Passenger Duty, an excise duty on flights departing the island
- Anti-Dumping Duty (ADD), a customs duty on imports from outside the EU
- Anti-terrorism controls Preventive work, "port controls" as Examining Officers for persons entering the island
- Appeals Case work, on appeals against decisions, penalties, assessments concerning assigned matters to the independent VAT & Duties Tribunal
- Approval of wharves, airport cargo sheds, warehouses etc: Premises approved for use in, allowed duty suspension or some other special relief or concession
- AWRS Alcohol Wholesalers Registration Scheme, Control of wholesalers of alcoholic products
- Biosecurity Controls, plant and animal health as agency function for DEFA
- Boarding of Isle of Man flag vessels in customs and excise warehouses etc, Delegated responsibility for approval for other "Convention states" to board Manx vessels in connection with drugs trafficking
- "Bootleg goods" control (smuggling): Control of excise goods imported from EU Member States without UK/Manx excise duty being accounted for
- Cash declarations, Cash exceeding €10,000 must be declared when it enters/ leaves the Island (including postal, freight, carried by passengers etc)
- Chemical import/export, Including precursor chemicals for drugs and explosives
- CITES Import/export control relating to endangered species, Agency function on behalf of DEFA
- Counterfeit or pirated goods See “Intellectual property rights”
- Cultural items Import and Export controls
- Customs approvals, authorisations and reliefs
- Customs duties Import or export duties chargeable under EU customs law
- Drug trafficking Import/export of controlled drugs, trafficking of same (anywhere in world) and financing of/proceeds from such trafficking
- Drugs precursors Precursor chemicals, used in the production of illegal drugs
- Duty-/tax-free shopping Where permitted - control of operators, shops, warehouses etc
- Excise duties on oils, alcohol, tobacco
- Export controls and export licensing Advice on, assistance in application for, and preparation of licences for exports outside UK/EU. Also investigations and assurance of Island-based exporters. Includes exports of “cultural goods”.
- Explosives precursors Precursor chemicals used in the production of explosives Control of Explosives Precursors
- Financing of Terrorism
- Fireworks Import control requirements, as agency function for DEFA
- FLEGT See “Timber” EU action plan for Forest Law Enforcement, Governance and Trade Freeport control
- Intellectual property Control of imports, counterfeit and other goods infringing IP rights
- Intrastat, Trade statistics collection for intra-EU commerce
- Import/export control of trade in “conflict” or “blood” diamonds, as agency for FCO
- Light Dues Levy on vessels to pay for lighthouses and other aids; agency function for Trinity House
- Lottery Duty Excise duty on sales of National Lottery tickets
- Machine Games Duty (MGD) Excise duty on takings of gaming machines
- Maritime patrol work Patrol, boarding, surveillance at sea using patrol craft (and DEFA vessel), and in conjunction with Border Force
- Money laundering AML work associated with assigned matters, mutual assistance requests etc
- Mutual assistance and mutual recovery, Handling/responding to request from UK, other EU, other countries re customs, excise, VAT, sanctions etc matters; including mutual recovery possible for UK and EU
- NOVA (vehicle imports) Pre-clearance of all vehicles other than from UK before they can be registered/licensed in the island
- Oil Duties Excise duties Hydrocarbon Oil Duties Act 1986
- Online gambling
- Postal traffic control: Import and export controls, plus agency work for other agencies re goods prohibited in Isle of Man (including controlled drugs)
- Prohibitions and restrictions General name for goods the import into the Island (either from UK or elsewhere) is banned (prohibited) or restricted (subject to licensing or other control); general agency function for another Island/UK body
- Public health control: As part of preventive customs duties, agency function for DHSC
- Public Health Orders
- Registered Firearms Dealers See “Firearms”
- RFTU Road Fuel Testing Unit: control of road fuels liable to excise duties
- Sanctions Administration, implementation, investigation etc of UN and EU sanctions (plus domestic anti-terrorism legislation)
- Other financial sanctions including counter financing of terrorism
- Trade embargo controls: Controls include arms and other embargoes, and bans on technical assistance, financing etc UN and EU sanctions measures
- VAT

== Non-Governmental Agencies reporting to Treasury ==
- Financial Supervision Commission
- Insurance and Pensions Authority
- Gambling Supervision Commission
- General Registry
- Public Lottery Trust

== Ministers for the Treasury ==
- Chris Thomas MHK, 2026 - Present
- Alex Allinson MHK, 2022 - 2026
- David Ashford MHK, 2021–2022
- Alfred Cannan MHK, 2016–2021
- Eddie Teare MHK, 2011–2016
- Anne Craine MHK, 2010–2011
- Allan Bell MHK, 2001–10
- Richard Corkill MHK, 1996–2001
- Donald Gelling MLC, 1989–96
- David Cannan MHK MLC, 1986–91

=== Chairmen of the Finance Board ===
- David Moore MHK, 1985–86
- Dr Edgar Mann MLC, 1981–85
- Percy Radcliffe MLC 1977–81
- John Bolton MLC, 1967–77
- Norman Crowe, 1964–67
- Bert Stephen MHK, 1962–64
