= Laurence Skelly =

Manx politician (born 1961)

The Honourable Laurence Skelly OBE MLC
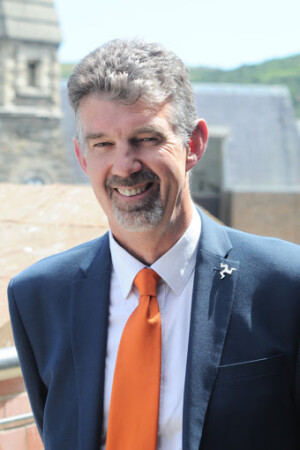
- Skelly in 2021

President of Tynwald
- In office 20 July 2021 – 21 July 2026
- Monarchs: Elizabeth II; Charles III
- Preceded by: Steve Rodan
- Succeeded by: Juan Watterson

Minister for Enterprise
- In office 24 November 2017 – October 2021
- Chief Minister: Howard Quayle
- Succeeded by: Howard Quayle

Minister for Economic Development
- In office 2 July 2014 – 24 November 2017
- Preceded by: John Shimmin

Minister for Infrastructure
- In office 3 March 2014 – 1 July 2014
- Preceded by: David Cretney
- Succeeded by: Phil Gawne

Member of the House of Keys for Rushen
- In office 29 September 2011 – 20 July 2021
- Succeeded by: Michelle Haywood

Personal details
- Born: 1961 (age 64–65)
- Party: Independent
- Spouse: Jackie Skelly
- Children: 2
- Education: Ramsey Grammar School

Laurence David Skelly OBE is a Manx politician, who served as President of Tynwald for five years, from July 2021 until July 2026.

== Political career ==
He was elected as one of the three MHKs for Rushen in 2011, with 19.4% of the vote and was re-elected in 2016 as one of the two members for the new Rushen constituency following the boundary review in 2013 with 21% of the vote.

In March 2014 he was appointed Minister for Infrastructure and following the resignation of John Shimmin in July of that year was appointed Minister for Economic Development.

Following the 2016 Manx general election, Skelly considered standing as Chief Minister but decided not to do so and instead continued to hold the Economic Development portfolio within the Howard Quayle administration.

In May 2021 he stated that he would not seek re-election in the 2021 Manx General Election but stated that he would stand for the position of President of Tynwald, the apolitical presiding officer of Tynwald Court and the Legislative Council.

In July 2021, Skelly was elected as President of Tynwald, succeeding Steve Rodan. He defeated Speaker of the House of Keys Juan Watterson by a vote of 20 to 12.

He did not seek re-election as President of Tynwald in 2026.

== Election results ==
=== 2011 ===
2011 Manx General Election: Rushen
Party	Candidate	Votes	%
Independent	Juan Watterson	3,080	29.57%
Independent	Laurence Skelly	2,021	19.40%
Independent	Phil Gawne	1,942	18.64%
Independent	Quintin Gill	1,722	16.53%
Independent	John Orme	1,195	11.47%
Independent	David Jones	457	4.39%
Total valid votes		10,417	
Rejected ballots		12	0.32%
Registered electors		5,789	
Turnout		3749	64.76%

=== 2016 ===
In 2014, Tynwald approved recommendations from the Boundary Review Commission which saw the reform of the Island's electoral boundaries.

Under the new system, the Island was divided into 12 constituencies based on population, with each area represented by two members of the House of Keys.

As a result of these changes the constituency was reduced in size and lost one of its three MHKs.

2016 Manx General Election: Rushen
Party	Candidate	Votes	%
Independent	Juan Watterson	2,087	36.19%
Independent	Laurence Skelly	1,212	21.02%
Independent	Mark Kemp	1,104	19.14%
Independent	James Hampton	1,033	17.91%
Independent	Leo Cussons	331	5.74%
Total valid votes		5,767	
Rejected ballots		13	0.41%
Registered electors		5,446	
Turnout		3173	58.26%

== Governmental positions ==
- Minister for Department of Economic Development, 2014–present
