= Chairman of the Executive Council =

The Chairman of the Executive Council of the Isle of Man was the executive head of the Isle of Man Government from 1961 to 1986. The title of the office was changed in 1986 to Chief Minister.

== Chairmen ==
No.	Portrait	Name (Lifespan)	Term	Party
1		Sir Charles Kerruish (1917–2003)	1961 – 1967	Independent
2		Norman Crowe (1905–1992)	1967 – 1971	Independent
(3)		Percy Radcliffe (1916–1991)	1971 – 1977	Independent
4		Clifford Irving (1914–2004)	1977 – 1981	Independent
3		Percy Radcliffe (1916–1991)	1981 – 1985	Independent
5		Lt Col Dr Edgar Mann (1926–2013)	1985 – 1986	Independent
Title changed to Chief Minister

== See also ==
- Executive Council of the Isle of Man
