= Isle of Man Office of Fair Trading =

The Isle of Man Office of Fair Trading (Manx: Oik Dellal Cair Ellan Vannin) is an independent Statutory Board of the Isle of Man Government. The purpose of the office is to enforce criminal consumer protection legislation and advice on civil consumer legislation however the office cannot enforce civil legislation. Such legislation provides consumers with certain rights when purchasing goods and services and these rights can ultimately only be enforced by the consumer through the Courts. Unsatisfactory goods and services, breaches of contracts for goods and services are examples of matters covered by civil legislation.

== Chairmen ==
- Martyn Perkins, 2016-
- David Quirk, 2011–2016
- Robert Henderson, 2008–2011
- Quintin Gill MHK, 2004–2008
- John Houghton MHK, 1999–2004
- Pamela Crowe MLC, 1997-2002
