= Ron Cretney =

Louis Ronald Cretney was a Minister in the Isle of Man Government.

Ron Cretney was born in Douglas and educated in Hanover Street School and Douglas High School before leaving the Island to train as a teacher at the Chester Diocesan Training College. He served in the Royal Artillery from 1942 to 1946 and saw duty in both India and Burma. On coming back from army service Ron returned to the classroom and following a few years teaching on the Wirral came back to the Isle of Man to teach in Rushen, Ballaugh, Willaston and Onchan primary schools, retiring as a headmaster.

Ron was elected to Onchan Village Commissioners in 1977, serving as their chairman in 1983. He was elected to the House of Keys for Onchan in the 1988 By Election, beating political heavyweight Edgar Mann and became Minister of Education in 1990, serving until 1991, when he retired from Tynwald.

He was a member of the Onchan Youth Club Management Committee, chaired the Onchan Silver Band and St George's AFC. He died in 2002.

== Governmental positions ==
- Minister of Education, 1990-1991
