= John Shimmin =

Manx politician (born 1960)

John Philip Shimmin (born 1 July 1960) is a former Member of the House of Keys for Douglas West.

== Early life ==
Shimmin was born in Douglas in 1960 and educated at St Ninian's High School and the Worcester College of Higher Education.

He was then a teacher (Physical Education, Mathematics, General Studies) from 1982 in several areas of the UK - Crewe, Tamworth, Knowsley before returning to teach in Douglas (St Ninian's High School) where he was also Head of Year from 1989 to 1996 until entering politics.

== Political career ==
Shimmin was elected as MHK for Douglas West in 1996 at his first attempt. He became Chairman of the Isle of Man Post Office in 1999 before becoming Minister of Transport in 2002.

In 2005, he swapped departments with the Minister of Home Affairs Phil Braidwood.

In November 2006, he was re-elected into Tynwald, alongside Geoff Corkish in West Douglas. He was appointed Local Government and the Environment Minister by newly elected Chief Minister Tony Brown in November 2006.

After the restructuring of Tynwald in 2010, he became Minister of Environment, Food and Agriculture before being promoted to Minister of Economic Development after the 2011 General Election.

He remained Minister of Economic Development of the Isle of Man Government until, following questions in regards to the Isle of Man Government's handling of the loans to the Manx-based Sefton Group, he resigned his ministerial post .

On 16 February 2015 he was appointed Minister for Policy and Reform, replacing Chris Robertshaw who had held the post for less than a year before resigning.

Following 20 years of service, Shimmin chose not to contest his seat at the 2016 General Election and subsequently stood down from politics (along with fellow long-standing members Allan Bell and Eddie Teare).

== Governmental positions ==
- Minister of Policy and Reform, 2015 - 2016
- Minister of Economic Development, 2011–2014
- Minister of Environment, Food and Agriculture, 2010 - 2011
- Minister of Local Government and the Environment, 2006–2010
- Minister of Home Affairs, 2005–2006
- Minister of Transport, 2002–2005
- Chairman of the Isle of Man Post Office, 1999–2002

== Personal life ==
Shimmin has been married to wife Maureen (née O'Hara) since 1986; they have two sons.
