= Clifford Irving (politician) =

Manx politician (1914–2004)

Clifford Irving (24 May 1914 – 13 July 2004) was an Isle of Man politician who, in a four-decade career lasting from 1955 to 1995, fulfilled a number of legislative and administrative duties, including those of Chairman of the Executive Council and Member of the Legislative Council.

Irving first stood for election to the House of Keys in 1955 and represented the constituencies of Douglas North and Douglas East from 1955 to 1962 and 1966 to 1981, rising, in 1977, to become Chairman of the Executive Council, the forerunner to the Chief Minister of the Isle of Man, a position he held until the end of his term of service in 1981. He returned to the House of Keys as MHK for Douglas West from 1984 to 1986. In 1987 he was elevated to the Legislative Council where he remained until 1995. During his earlier term of service as Chairman of the Tourist Board in 1971, he oversaw the Island's tourism flourish for a decade, famously offering a £10,000 reward to anyone finding a mermaid in Manx waters.

Irving lived for another nine years after the end of his public service career in 1995. He died shortly after his 90th birthday.

== Governmental positions ==
- Chairman of the Tourism Board, 1971–1981
- Chairman of the Executive Council, 1977–1981
