= David Anderson (Manx politician) =

Manx politician

- Born: David Moore Anderson; 6 February 1954 (age 72); Isle of Man
- Occupation: Politician
- Years active: 2001–2018
- Employer: Isle of Man Government
- Spouse: Jane Williams (m. 1982)
- Children: 1 son, 1 daughter

David Moore Anderson (born 6 February 1954) is a former Member of the House of Keys (MHK) for Glenfaba. He also served in a number of ministerial posts on the Isle of Man and is therefore a former member of the Council of Ministers.

== Political career ==
Anderson was elected as a Member of the House of Keys in 2001 for Glenfaba. He was re-elected in 2006 and 2011. He had previously served as a Commissioner for the parish of Patrick from 1992 until his election to the House of Keys.

He was elected to the Legislative Council in 2015, for what was intended to be a five-year term, but he announced his early retirement in 2018.

He was called to resign by protesters following his support of legislation which would have prohibited the advocacy of homosexuality in schools.

=== Ministerial positions ===
Anderson served in several ministerial posts while a member of the House of Keys:

- Minister for Education, 2004–06
- Minister for Transport, 2006–10
- Minister for Health, 2010–14

== Personal life ==
Anderson is the son of Ian Anderson, an Ulsterman who formerly served as President of the Legislative Council.

David Anderson received his secondary education at the Douglas High School for Boys. He later moved to Cumbria, where he studied at Newton Rigg Agricultural College.

He has been married to Jane (née Williams) since 1982; they have 2 grown up children together. He also has worked as a dairy and mixed farmer. He also served as the Vice-President of the Manx Farmers Union from 1999 until 2001.

He is a keen athlete, having competed in the Commonwealth Games in 1978. He was recently World Champion for Under 50s at 400m hurdles, and continues to race.

Preceded by Walter Gilbey	MHK for Glenfaba; 2001–2018	Ray Harmer
