= Betty Hanson =

Manx politician (1918–2008)

Betty Hanson (23 November 1918 – 25 June 2008) was a Manx politician and teacher. Hanson served as a Member of the House of Keys (MHK), the lower house of the Tynwald from 1974 until 1982 for the Douglas West constituency. She was elected to the Legislative Council of the Isle of Man, the upper house of the Tynwald, in 1982, becoming the first woman ever elected to that particular legislature. She remained a member of the Legislative Council (MLC) until 1988.

== Biography ==
=== Personal life ===
Betty Hanson was born Betty Lucas in Peel, Isle of Man on the 23rd of November 1918. At the age of 18 she went to Avery hill Teacher Training College in Elthom. She then won a scholarship to the Slade School of Fine Art, but due to the outbreak of WWII her father insisted that she attend Liverpool College of Art instead since it was closer to her home. After 6 months the blitz began and she started working as a teacher in a school in Scotland Road. She became a fire fighter at night and won a defence medal for her service. After the war she chose teaching as her profession. Betty Hanson taught at both St John's primary school and Douglas High School, where she taught art, history, home economics and English. Betty Hanson's late husband, Eric Hanson, a veteran of the Burma campaign, also pursued a career in education, serving as the head teacher of St Thomas's School for 27 years before joining the Albert Road Junior School in Ramsey.

=== Politics ===
Hanson entered the political realm when she joined the Isle of Man's Board of Education as a non-Tynwald member, where she served from 1971 until 1974. Following her election to the House of Keys in 1974, Hanson returned to chair the Board of Education as a full Tynwald member from 1976 until 1981. Hanson oversaw the creation of Queen Elizabeth II High School, the first secondary school in the western portion of the Isle of Man, and personally escorted the school's namesake, Queen Elizabeth II, on a tour of the facility in 1979.

She served as the chairman and chief planner of the Tynwald's Millennium Committee celebrations in 1979. In the weeks prior to the celebration, Hanson traveled to the United States as chairman, where she was instrumental in the establishment of the North American Manx Awards, which are still overseen by the Manx Board of Education. The awards were founded by Hanson and others as a way to acknowledge artistic achievements in Manx music, language, arts, culture and crafts.

Betty Hanson became the first woman ever elevated to the Legislative Council of the Isle of Man in 1982, a post she held until 1988. She continued to serve as governor of St Thomas's Café Primary School until her death in 2008. She was also the honorary vice president of the World Manx Association.

=== Death ===
Betty Hanson died on June 24, 2008, at the age of 89 at the Elder Grange Nursing Home in Douglas, Isle of Man. She had been in the care of the nursing home since February 2008. Hanson is survived by her children, Mark and Leslie.
