= Douglas East (ward) =

- Electoral ward
- Country: Isle of Man
- Local Authority: Douglas
- Created: July 2021

Government
  - Type: Unicameral
  - Body: Douglas Borough Council
  - Councillor: Andrew Bentley (Isle of Man Green Party)
  - Councillor: Devon Watson (Manx Labour Party)
  - Councillor: Ian Clague (Independent)

Douglas East is a Ward (electoral subdivision) in Douglas, Isle of Man whose boundaries are the same as the House of Keys constituency Douglas East. The ward was formed for the 2021 local authority elections following the abolition of Derby and Victoria Wards.

The ward contains much of the towns central business district including the town's main shopping streets, Strand Street, Duke Street, Castle Street and Victoria Street.

Douglas Promenade, and its horse tram service, runs along the length of the ward from the Sea Terminal to the Manx Electric Railway station at the former Summerland site.

Notable public buildings include the Manx Parliament building, The Sea Terminal, The Castle Mona and The Courts of Justice.

The Little Switzerland area of the ward contain numerous buildings in the Arts and Crafts style of architecture including numerous works by the notable architects Baillie Scott and Armitage Rigby.

The ward elects 3 members to Douglas Borough Council.

== Culture, Leisure and Sport ==
Nobles Park is home to the grandstand, fan zone and paddock areas at the start and finish line of the TT races. The park is also home to a number of playing fields, 3 crown green bowling pitches, BMX track, skate park, tennis courts, bandstand and the island's first splash park.

In addition to Nobles Park East Douglas is home to a number of public open spaces, the Marine Gardens on Loch Promenade, the Villa Marina Gardens, Summerhill Glen and the Victorian Squares of Derby Square, Hutchinson Square and Hillary Park.

Douglas East has the home ground of two of Douglas's football teams St Georges A.F.C.and Braddan A.F.C., there is a further crown green bowling pitch at the Villa Marina gardens and Douglas Snooker Club is located on Ballaquayle Road.

Many of the town's cultural facilities are located within the ward. The Manx Museum, Villa Marina, Gaiety Theatre, Palace Cinemas and the Isle of Man Arts Society are located in Douglas East.

== Electoral history ==
Douglas East Ward election, 22 July 2021
Party	Candidate	Votes	%
Green	Andrew Bentley (elected)	551	63.6
Manx Labour	Devon Watson (elected)	540	62.3
Independent	Ian Clague (elected)	373	43.0
Independent	Angela Joughin	324	37.4
Independent	Linda Coe	235	27.1
Majority		11	1.2
Turnout		867	17.84
Rejected ballots		5	0.6
