= Glenfaba & Peel =

House of Keys constituency

Glenfaba & Peel is a House of Keys constituency in the west of the Isle of Man. It was created for the 2016 general election and elects 2 MHKs; currently Kate Lord-Brennan and Tim Crookall.

== Elections ==
General election 2021: Glenfaba & Peel
Party	Candidate	Votes	%
Independent	Kate Alice Lord-Brennan	2,150	30.9
Independent	Timothy Mark Crookall	1,134	19.3
Independent	Raymond Karl Harmer	1,073	15.4
Independent	Leonard Trevor Cowin	1,070	15.4
Green	Leo Cussons	855	12.3
Independent	Geoffrey Boot	273	3.9
Independent	Michael William Lee	201	2.9
Total votes		6,756	
Total ballots		3,639	
Rejected ballots		6	
Turnout		3,645	57.1
Registered electors		6,380	

General election 2016: Glenfaba & Peel
Party	Candidate	Votes	%
Independent	Raymond Karl Harmer	2,195	41.9
Independent	Geoffrey Boot	1,805	34.5
Independent	Leslie Hanson	1,238	23.6
Total votes		5,237	
Total ballots		3,261	
Rejected ballots		24	
Turnout		3,285	55.8
Registered electors		5,886	
