= Kate Lord-Brennan =

Manx politician

Minister for the Cabinet Office
- In office October 2021 – 25 November 2024
- Succeeded by: David Ashford

Member of the House of Keys for Glenfaba & Peel
- In office September 2021 – 13 August 2026

Member of the Legislative Council
- In office March 2018 – September 2021

Personal details
- Education: University of Leeds
- Occupation: Politician

Kate Lord-Brennan is a Manx former politician who was a member of Tynwald from 2018 to 2026. She sat in the Legislative Council from 2018 to 2021 and represented Glenfaba & Peel in the House of Keys from the 2021 Manx general election until the house was dissolved ahead of the 2026 Manx general election, at which she did not stand. From 2021 to 2024 she was Minister for the Cabinet Office in the Council of Ministers.

== Early life ==
Lord-Brennan attended Ballakermeen High School. She graduated from the University of Leeds in 2005.

== Political career ==
Lord-Brennan was elected to the Legislative Council in March 2018. At the 2021 general election she stood in Glenfaba & Peel and topped the poll with 2,150 votes.

In October 2021 she was appointed by Chief Minister Alfred Cannan as Minister for the Cabinet Office. Alongside the ministerial post she chaired the Public Services Commission and was vice-chair of the Public Sector Pensions Authority. She resigned from the Council of Ministers on 25 November 2024, saying she wanted to focus on constituency matters, and was succeeded at the Cabinet Office by David Ashford.

She later sat on Tynwald's Economic Policy Review Committee, which in December 2025 published a report on the role of the Treasury, the structural deficit and the use of the island's reserves.

In July 2026 she announced that she would not seek re-election, saying she intended to return to the private sector. Her term in the House of Keys ended when it was dissolved on 13 August 2026.
