= President of the Legislative Council of the Isle of Man =

The President of the Legislative Council (Eaghtyrane y Choonceil Slattyssagh) is the principal officer of the Legislative Council of the Isle of Man. Until 1980, the Lieutenant Governor presided ex officio. From 1980 to 1990, the members elected a president from among their number. Since 1990, the President of Tynwald has been elected by the members of Tynwald from among their number and sits ex officio as the President of the Legislative Council.

The president of the council, as the presiding officer, remains impartial. but has casting vote; that is, in the case of a tied vote, the president breaks the tie.

The president is also responsible for controlling the procedure of the council and for the authoritative interpretation of its standing orders, and has the duty of nominating the member of the council to be responsible for promoting each bill which is to come before council.

== Presidents ==
- The Lieutenant Governor (ex officio), until 1980
- Mr Jack Nivison MLC CBE JP CP, 1980–1988
- Mr Ian Anderson MLC, 1988–1990
- The President of Tynwald (ex officio), from 1990
