= Claire Christian =

Claire Christian is the director of the Secretariat of the Antarctic and Southern Ocean Coalition (ASOC) based in Washington, D.C., US.

== Early life and education ==
Christian received an MA in International Affairs at American University (2008). Before joining the Antarctic and Southern Ocean Coalition, she held a post as Program Assistant at the US National Council for Science and the Environment.

== Career and impact ==
Christian began working for the Antarctic and Southern Ocean Coalition in 2009. She was acting director in 2016 and director by 2017. At ASOC Christian is responsible for developing policy and strategy on issues ranging from tourism and fishing to climate change, as well as writing papers for international governance meetings related to Antarctic environment and policy. She also regularly contributes articles on Antarctica to a range of platforms, generally focusing on environmental challenges. Her work has further helped to raise the profile of antarctic conservation efforts.
