= General Registry (Isle of Man) =

The General Registry (Manx: Oik-Reccortysse) is the department which administers –

- the civil and criminal Courts of the Isle of Man
  - the High Court of Justice of the Isle of Man
  - Courts of General Gaol Delivery
  - courts of summary jurisdiction
- the Registries
  - Deeds and Probate Registry
  - Land Registry
  - Civil Registry, responsible for registration of births, deaths and marriages
- registration of charities
- Legal Aid
- the Public Record Office
- criminal injuries compensation
- registration of legal practitioners (other than advocates)

The General Registry was established by the General Registry Act 1965. Its chief executive officer is the Chief Registrar.
