= David North (politician) =

Manx politician

David North MBIM (born 1942) is a British politician, a former Minister in the Isle of Man Government.

He was born in Bradford of Manx parents and educated at Douglas High School. He then pursued a career abroad before returning as managing director of John North Ltd, J Smylie & Sons Ltd, and chairman of House & Home Ltd. He was also the Isle of Man correspondent for the Financial Times. At the 1988 by election he was elected MHK for Middle and remained in post until the 2001 General Election when he retired. He held several ministerial positions under both Sir Miles Walker and Donald Gelling.

== Governmental positions ==
- Minister of Agriculture, Fisheries and Forestry, 1989–1991
- Minister of Highways, Ports and Properties, 1991–1994
- Minister of Transport, 1994–1996
- Minister of Trade and Industry, 1996–2001
