= Chris Robertshaw =

English-born Manx politician

Deputy Speaker of the House of Keys
- In office 25 September 2016 – 12 August 2021
- Chief Minister: Howard Quayle
- Succeeded by: Daphne Caine

Minister for Policy and Reform
- In office 5 April 2014 – 16 February 2015
- Preceded by: Position Established
- Succeeded by: John Shimmin

Minister for Community, Culture and Leisure
- In office 3 March 2014 – 1 April 2014
- Preceded by: Graham Cregeen
- Succeeded by: Position Abolished

Minister for the Social Care
- In office 14 October 2011 – 3 March 2014
- Preceded by: Martyn Quayle
- Succeeded by: Howard Quayle

Member of the House of Keys for Douglas East
- In office 28 May 2010 – 12 August 2021

Personal details
- Born: 1948 (age 77–78) Chester
- Party: Independent
- Spouse: Joan Robertshaw
- Children: 2

Christopher Roy Robertshaw is an English-born Manx politician who served as Member of the House of Keys for Douglas East until August 2021. He previously served as Deputy Speaker of the House of Keys, Minister of Social Care, Minister for Community, Culture and Leisure and Minister for Policy and Reform.

== Early life ==
Robertshaw was born in 1948 in Chester, and is married with two children and five grandchildren.

He was schooled in a Roman Catholic seminary and served in the British Army in Libya, Cyprus, Germany, England and Norway. In 2005 he retired as Managing Director, Company Secretary and Registrar of Sefton Hotel Plc after a 35-year career in hospitality. He is currently a director of the charity Kemmyrk and a member of the Douglas Regeneration Committee, of the Institute of Hospitality and of the Positive Action Group.

== Political career ==
In 2010, he replaced Phil Braidwood as MHK for Douglas East in a by-election, and was re-elected at the 2011 and 2016 general elections.

In 2015, he resigned as Minister for Policy and Reform after less than a year in post, to be replaced by John Shimmin.

Among other issues, he has campaigned for the island's government to become a single legal entity (at present each department has its own legal identity).

Following re-election in 2016, Robertshaw stated publicly that he would not contest the next election in 2021.

== Governmental positions ==
- Minister for Policy and Reform, 2014-2015
- Minister of Social Care, 2011–2014

== Election results ==
=== 2016 ===
2016 Manx General Election: Douglas East
Party	Candidate	Votes	%
Independent	Claire Bettison	561	18.06%
Independent	Chris Robertshaw	487	15.68%
Independent	Jon Joughin	480	15.45%
Independent	Quintin Gill	415	13.36%
Independent	Amanda Walker	373	12.01%
Independent	Cat Turner	324	10.43%
Independent	John McBride	303	9.76%
Independent	Richard Halsall	163	5.25%
Total valid votes		3106	
Rejected ballots		2	0.12%
Registered electors		4,251	
Turnout		1705	40.11%

=== 2011 ===
2011 Manx General Election: Douglas East
Party	Candidate	Votes	%
Independent	Chris Robertshaw	915	30.87%
Independent	Brenda Cannell	757	25.54%
Independent	Paul Moulton	490	16.53%
Independent	Geraldine O'Neill	441	14.88%
Independent	Richard Kissack	238	8.03%
Independent	John Karran	123	4.15%
Total valid votes		2964	
Rejected ballots		12	0.71%
Registered electors		4,136	
Turnout		1700	41.1%

=== 2010 ===
2010 Douglas East By-election
Party	Candidate	Votes	%
Independent	Chris Robertshaw	388	27.17%
Independent	Kate Beecroft	301	21.08%
Independent	Kevin Woodford	276	19.33%
Independent	Jon Joughin	146	10.22%
Independent	Christopher Heath	72	5.04%
Total valid votes		1428	
Registered electors		3792	
Turnout			37.82

=== 2006 ===
2006 Manx General Election: Douglas East
Party	Candidate	Votes	%
Independent	Phil Braidwood	777	28.63%
Independent	Brenda Cannell	728	26.82%
Independent	Chris Robertshaw	574	21.15%
Independent	William Platt	252	9.29%
Independent	Stephen Osborne	194	7.15%
Independent	Carol Jempson	189	6.96%
Total valid votes		2714	
Rejected ballots		8	0.78%
Registered electors		3,035	
Turnout		1540	50.74%
