= Julia Delaney =

Irish-born Manx politician (born 1934)

Julia Delaney (born 8 February 1934) is an Irish-born Manx politician who was a member of the House of Keys from 1986 to 1991. She was born in County Wexford on 8 February 1934, and was the wife of Dominic Delaney.
