= Antarctic and Southern Ocean Coalition =

Coalition of non-governmental organizations

- Founded: 1978
- Type: Non-governmental organization
- Purpose: Advocacy on species protection, Marine Protected Area and regulation of commercial activities in Antarctica and Southern Ocean
- Location: (United States) Washington, D.C., U.S.
- Method: Advocacy, Lobbying, Political campaign, Research (Scientific, Economic, Social), Speaking Engagements
- Key people: James Barnes, Executive Director and Co-Founder; Claire Christian, Director of the Secretariat
- Website: www.asoc.org

The Antarctic and Southern Ocean Coalition (ASOC) is a global coalition of environmental non-governmental organizations with more than 20 members in 15 countries worldwide. ASOC has worked since 1978 to ensure that the Antarctic Continent, its surrounding islands and the great Southern Ocean survive as the world's last unspoiled wilderness, a global commons for the heritage of future generations. ASOC is supported entirely through donations from individual supporters around the world, dues from its members and grants from foundations. The Secretariat of the Antarctic and Southern Ocean Coalition (ASOC), which includes 20 organizations in 15 countries, is based in Washington, D.C. The ASOC Council includes member groups that have paid dues or provided significant in-kind services to the ASOC campaign team.

== Campaign ==
ASOC aims to advocate on behalf of the Antarctic environment and ecosystems. Major campaigns include the Antarctic Krill Conservation Project, which works to protect the base of the Antarctic food web, regulating commercial tourism, protecting the Ross Sea, strengthening the Southern Ocean Whale Sanctuary, protecting seamounts, managing Southern Ocean fisheries sustainably, and implementing the Protocol on Environmental Protection to the Antarctic Treaty.

== History ==
ASOC was founded in 1978 by James Barnes, an environmental lawyer, and 25 other members from Friends of the Earth, World Wildlife Fund, and other environmental organizations. ASOC's initial objectives were to convince governments to conclude negotiation of the world's first "ecosystem as a whole" treaty on fishing; prevent oil, gas, and minerals development in the Antarctic by blocking the ratification of the proposed Minerals Convention; and to open up the Antarctic Treaty System to include participation by NGOs and specialist international bodies.

In 1991, ASOC was granted observer status in the Antarctic Treaty System, and began attending annual meetings. ASOC has expanded its portfolio to include issues such as tourism, shipping, and climate change.

In 2008, ASOC became a member of the International Union for Conservation of Nature.
