= Insurance and Pensions Authority =

Former Isle of Man insurance and pensions regulatory authority

The Insurance and Pensions Authority (Manx: Lught-reill Urryssaght as Penshynyn) or IPA was the statutory body responsible for the regulation and supervision of pensions and insurance businesses operated in or from the Isle of Man. In 2015, the IPA merged with the Financial Supervision Commission (FSC) to form the Financial Services Authority (IOMFSA).

== History ==
It was first established as the Insurance Authority in 1986. In 1997, its remit was expanded to include oversight of businesses providing pensions and similar products, and it was renamed the Insurance and Pensions Authority.

== Remit ==
Its remit was to authorise and supervise those businesses carrying on these activities, either in or from the Island. It also oversaw general insurance brokers. (Those brokers advising on or arranging "long term insurance", for example, life policies which offer investment benefits, were supervised by the island's other financial services regulator, the Financial Supervision Commission).

In addition the IPA administered the Isle of Man's compensation scheme, which is intended to provide protection for policyholders if a life assurance company should be unable to meet its liabilities.

== Chairmen ==
- Clare Christian MHK, 1986-1987
- Jim Cain FCA MHK, 1987-1988
- Norman Radcliffe MLC, 1988-2002
- Donald Gelling CBE, 2002-2012
- Peter Pell-Hilley, 2012-2015

== Chief Executives ==
- Dr Bill Hastings, 1987–2001
- David Vick, 2002–2015

== Legislative base ==
The primary legislation from which the IPA derived its powers included:

- The Insurance Act 1986
- The Retirement Benefits Schemes Act 2000

In addition the IPA oversaw implementation of the Anti Money Laundering Standards, secondary legislation which sets out how businesses regulated by it must conduct themselves in order to prevent their being used by money launderers or for terrorist finance.
