= Ian Anderson (Manx politician) =

Irish politician

Robert John Gurney Anderson (16 June 1925 – 11 January 2005), known as Ian Anderson, was a President of the Legislative Council of the Isle of Man.

Ian Anderson was born and raised in Glencross, a townland on the north-western outskirts of Rathmullan, a small town in the north of County Donegal in Ulster, the northern province in Ireland, in 1925. He left school at the age of 13 and joined the Belfast Technical College before moving to the Isle of Man in 1946. In 1963, Ian was elected as a member of Patrick commissioners and remained as such until being elected as member of the House of Keys for Glenfaba. In 1982 he was elevated to the Legislative Council and remained a member until retiring from Tynwald in 1993. In 1988 he was elected as the, second ever non-Governor, President of the Legislative Council. He served until 1990 when the constitution was altered and Sir Charles Kerruish became ex officio President. Ian Anderson also held many Ministerial-level appointments during his career. He died on 11 January 2005.

His son is David Anderson, a former MHK.

== Governmental positions ==
- Minister of Industry, 1986-1988
- Member of the Executive Council, 1971-1982
- Chairman of the Local Government Board
- Chairman of the Police Board
- Chairman of the Home Affairs Board
- Chairman of the Civil Service Commission
