= Douglas West (constituency) =

Coordinates: 54°09′37″N 4°29′24″W

Douglas West was a House of Keys constituency in Douglas, Isle of Man. It elected 2 MHKs.

== MHKs & elections ==
Year	Election	Turnout	Candidates	Elected
1946	General Election		Sir John Bolton, elected	
1951	General Election		Sir John Bolton, elected	
1956	General Election		Sir John Bolton, elected; James Mylchreest Cain, elected	
1962	General Election		James Mylchreest Cain; Sir John Bolton, elected; Victor Kneale, elected; ?	
1962	By-Election		?	James Mylchreest Cain
Called following the elevation to the LegCo of Sir John Bolton.
1966	General Election		Victor Kneale, elected; ?	
1971	General Election		Victor Kneale, elected; ?	
1976	General Election		?	Betty Hanson, elected; Edward Kermeen, elected
1981	General Election		?	Victor Kneale, elected; Betty Hanson, elected
1982	By-Election		?	Brian Gelling
Called following the elevation to the LegCo of Betty Hanson.
1984	By-Election		?	Clifford Irving, elected
1986	General Election	72.5%	James Cain (945 votes, elected); Victor Kneale SHK (632 votes, elected); CHA Flynn (454 votes); JAS Christian (397 votes); JB Callow (130 votes); RMB Kennett (108 votes); WA Parkinson (54 votes)	
1991	General Election		James Cain SHK (770 votes, elected); Alex Downie (616 votes, elected); Captain Andrew Douglas (482 votes); CHA Flynn (279 votes); JR Mitchell (164 votes); JB Callow (164 votes); RMB Kennett (98 votes); Rev. G Kenyon (68 votes)	
1996	General Election	60.3%	John Shimmin (1637 votes, elected); Alex Downie (1515 votes, elected); James Cain SHK (911 votes)	
Challenger John Shimmin topped the poll, unseating Speaker Cain.
2001	General Election	52.6%	Alex Downie (1528 votes, elected); John Shimmin (1506 votes, elected); Michael Percival (628 votes); Peter Murcott (253 votes)	
2005	By-Election		?	Dominic Delaney
Called following the elevation of Alex Downie to the Legislative Council.
2006	General Election	56.8%	John Shimmin, 1009 votes, elected; Geoff Corkish, 1248 votes, elected; Geoff Cannell, 692 votes; Roland Ardern-Corris, 518 votes	
2011	General Election	55.8%	John Shimmin, 1316 votes, elected; Geoff Corkish, 1017 votes, elected; Chris Thomas, 913 votes; John Skinner, 732 votes	
23 May 2013	By election	39.7%	Chris Thomas, 676 votes, elected; John Skinner, 399 votes; Clive Dawson, 300 votes; Quintin Gill, 229 votes	
