= Dominic Delaney =

Manx politician (born 1943)

Dominic Francis Kevin Delaney is a former member of the House of Keys and the Legislative Council of the Isle of Man, where he sat as a member of the Alliance for Progressive Government. He was once called "one of the Island's most outspoken politicians".

== Personal life ==
Delaney was born in Douglas in 1943 and attended St Mary's School. He is a retired member of the Parachute Regiment, has been employed as a PR consultant and has been a company director. He married Julia in 1969 and they have one daughter together and two sons and one daughter from Julia's previous marriage; Julia was MHK for Douglas North from 1986 to 1991.

== Politics ==
He became a member of the Douglas Town Council in 1972 and remained in that post until he stood for the Keys in 1976 in Douglas East. He remained a member of the Keys (MHK) until his elevation to the Legislative Council in 1995. He raised concerns about immigration and the settlement of asylum seekers in the Isle of Man in 2002.

In 2005 he sought re-election to the council for a third term, but after three rounds of unsuccessful voting the House of Keys elevated Hon Alex Downie instead. Delaney then fought the ensuing by-election in Douglas West and became a MHK again. He became the Member for Social Security in August 2005. He is also a former Minister in Sir Miles Walker's Council.

Delaney stood down from the House of Keys in October 2006 due to ill health.

== Governmental positions ==
- Chairman of the Board of Social Security, 1976-1980
- Chairman of the Civil Defence Commission, 1976-1981
- Chairman of the Manx Electric Railway Board, 1981-1983
- Chairman of the Isle of Man Passenger Transport Board, 1983-1985
- Minister of Local Government and the Environment, 1986-1989
