= Department of Infrastructure (Isle of Man) =

Department of the Isle of Man Government

Department overview
- Formed: 1 April 2010; 16 years ago
- Preceding Department: Mainly Department of Transport
- Jurisdiction: Isle of Man
- Headquarters: Sea Terminal, Douglas, Isle of Man
- Employees: 763
- Annual budget: GBP 77.0m for 2011–2012
- Minister responsible: Tim Crookall MHK, Minister for Infrastructure
- Department executive: Emily Curphey, Chief Executive Officer
- Website: www.gov.im/infrastructure

The Department of Infrastructure (Manx: Rheynn Bun-Troggalys) is a department of the Isle of Man Government.

== History ==
The department was created in April 2010 from the Department of Transport.

The Department of Transport was itself created in 1994 by the merger of the transport functions of the Department of Tourism, Leisure and Transport and the Department of Highways, Ports and Properties.

== Functions ==
- Highways
- Airports
- Harbours
- Works
- Quarries
- Planning
- Building control
- Government property
- Estates and architects
- Meat plant
- Animal waste
- Waste management operations
- Public transport

=== Non-governmental agencies reporting to the department ===
- Manx Electricity Authority
- Water and Sewerage Authority
- Local government
- Planning Authority
- Health and Safety Executive Authority
- Road Transport and Licensing Committee

== Previous ministers ==
=== Previous Ministers for Infrastructure ===
- Phil Gawne MHK, 2014–2016
- Laurence Skelly MHK, 2014
- David Cretney MHK, 2011–2014
- Phil Gawne MHK, 2010–2011

=== Previous Ministers for Transport ===
- David Anderson MHK, 2006–2010
- Phil Braidwood MHK, 2005–2006
- John Shimmin MHK, 2001–2005
- Tony Brown MHK, 1996–2001
- David North MHK, 1994–1996

=== Previous Ministers of Highways, Ports and Properties ===
- David North MHK, 1991–1994
- Arnold Callin, 1986–1991

== See also ==
- Isle of Man Transport
- Northern Lighthouse Board (the general lighthouse authority for the Isle of Man and Scotland)
