= Douglas East =

House of Keys constituency

Coordinates: 54°09′26″N 4°28′38″W

Douglas East is a House of Keys constituency in Douglas, Isle of Man. It elects 2 MHKs.

Since the 2021 local elections the constituency's area has been adopted for Douglas East (ward) which replaced most of Victoria and Derby wards. The ward elects 3 councilors to Douglas Borough Council.

== MHKs and elections ==
Year	Election	Turnout	Candidates	Elected	Notes
1962	General Election	?	?	Percy Coupe	
1971	General Election	?	Katherine Cowin (elected); Charles Burke; ?		
1976	General Election	?	?	Dominic Delaney; Katherine Cowin	
1981	General Election	?	?	Dominic Delaney; ?	
1986	General Election	?	?	Dominic Delaney; Phil Kermode	
1991	General Election	53%	Dominic Delaney (796 votes, elected); Phil Kermode (522 votes, elected); Brenda Cannell (306 votes); PT Bell (240 votes); A Shea (54 votes)		The two sitting MHKs held their seats.
1995	By-Election	39.9%	Phil Braidwood (611 votes, elected); Brenda Cannell (336 votes); Christian (289 votes); Freegard (161 votes)		By-election called by the elevation of Dominic Delaney to the LegCo.
1996	General Election	50.9%	Phil Braidwood (1289 votes, elected); Brenda Cannell (836 votes, elected); Phil Kermode (593 votes)		
2001	General Election	41%	Phil Braidwood (1168 votes, elected); Brenda Cannell (973 votes, elected); Colin Cain (474 votes); Philip White (201 votes)		The two sitting MHKs held their seats.
2006	General Election	51%	Phil Braidwood (777 votes, elected); Brenda Cannell (728 votes, elected); Carol Jempson (189 votes); Steve Osbourne (194 votes); Bill Platt (252 votes); Chris Robertshaw (574 votes)		The two sitting MHKs held their seats.
2010	By-election	n/a	Chris Robertshaw (388 votes, elected); Kate Beecroft, Liberal Vannin (381 votes); Kevin Woodford (276 votes); Colin Cain (245 votes); John Joughin (146 votes); Chris Heath (72 votes)		By-election called by the elevation of Phil Braidwood to the LegCo.
2011	General Election	40.7%	Chris Robertshaw (915 votes, elected); Brenda Cannell (757 votes, elected); Paul Moulton (490 votes); Geraldine O'Neill (441 votes); Richard Kissack (238 votes); John Karran (123 votes)		The two sitting MHKs held their seats.
2015	By-election		Jon Joughin (159 votes, elected); Clare Bettison (146 votes); Richard Falk (145 votes); Geraldine O'Neill (131 votes); Catherine Turner (108 votes); John McBride (90 votes); Kurt Buchholz (75 votes)		

== Election results since 2016 ==
In 2014, Tynwald approved recommendations from the Boundary Review Commission which saw the reform of the Island's electoral boundaries.

General election 2021: Douglas East
Party	Candidate	Votes	%
Manx Labour	Joney Leanne Faragher	741	24.1
Independent	Clare Louise Barber	692	22.5
Liberal Vannin	Michael Josem	508	16.5
Independent	Jonathan Joughin	477	14.6
Independent	Peter Roy Gilmour	313	10.2
Independent	Amanda Jane Walker	217	7.1
Independent	Christine Urquhart	152	5.0
Total votes		3,100	
Total ballots		1,772	
Rejected ballots		4	
Turnout		1,776	36.3
Registered electors		4,891	

General election 2016: Douglas East
Party	Candidate	Votes	%
Independent	Clare Barber	561	18.1
Independent	Christopher Roy Robertshaw	487	15.7
Independent	Jonathan Joughin	480	15.5
Independent	Quintin Bennett Gill	415	13.4
Independent	Amanda Jane Walker	373	12.0
Independent	Catherine Rose Turner	324	10.4
Independent	John Caley McBride	303	9.8
Manx Labour	Richard Frederick Halsall	163	5.2
Total votes		3,106	
Total ballots		1,703	
Rejected ballots		2	
Turnout		1,705	40.1
Registered electors		4,251	
