= Victor Kneale =

Manx politician (1918–2007)

George Victor Harris Kneale CBE (12 January 1918 – 8 April 2007) was a Manx politician and Speaker of the House of Keys and Education Minister.

Victor Kneale was elected MHK for Douglas West in 1962. He was Chairman of the Board of Education for 15 years, having been a non political member of the Board from 1951 until his election in 1962. He was then elevated to the Legislative Council of the Isle of Man in 1974 before resigning his seat to contest the 1981 General Election. He resigned because of his belief the Legislative Council members should be publicly elected. This was an issue he was still pursuing until a short time before his death having recently submitted his own system for such elections to the Council of Ministers for consideration. He won his old seat back and became Minister of Education until 1990 when he was elected Speaker of the House of Keys. He retired at the 1991 General Election.

Mr. Kneale became well known as a fierce critic at times of both the government and politicians in general. He was heavily involved in the Scouting movement, being an Island Vice President, and a President of the Isle of Man Branch of the Royal Artillery Association. He was appointed a CBE in 1989.

== Governmental positions ==
- Chairman of the Board of Education, 1962–1972, 1981–1986
- Education Minister, 1986–1990
