= Financial Supervision Commission =

Former financial regulatory body of the Isle of Man

The Financial Supervision Commission (FSC) (Manx: Barrantee Oaseirys Argidoil) was the financial regulator of the Isle of Man.

The commission was established in 1983. The Chairman was previously a Member of Tynwald until legislation forbade this in 2004.

In 2015, the FSC merged with the Insurance and Pensions Authority (IPA) to form the Financial Services Authority (IOMFSA).

== Chairpersons ==
FSC

- Col Edgar Mann, 1983-1985
- David Cannan MHK, 1986-1989
- Donald Gelling, 1989-1996
- Walter Gilbey, 1996-1999
- Phil Braidwood MHK, 1999-2001
- Alan Crowe MLC, 2001-2003
- Rosemary Penn, 2004-2012
- Geoff Karran, 2012-2015

IOMFSA

- Geoff Karran, 2015-2018
- Lillian Boyle, since 2018
