= Phil Braidwood =

Manx politician (born 1949)

- Born: Robert Philip Braidwood; 11 July 1949 (age 76); Bolton, England
- Occupation: Politician
- Years active: 1995–present
- Employer: Isle of Man Government
- Spouse: Lynda Donaldson (m. 1974)
- Children: 2

Robert Philip Braidwood (born 11 July 1949) is a Manx politician, who was formerly a Member of the Legislative Council; he was previously an MHK for Douglas East after winning the Douglas East by-election in 1995 and he continued to top the poll in every General Election since then until his elevation to the Legislative Council in 2010, which sparked a by-election won by Chris Robertshaw.

He has had a long political career and has held numerous government positions, notably Minister of Transport (2005–06) and Minister of Home Affairs (2001–05).

== Early life ==
Braidwood was born in Bolton (then in Lancashire, now Greater Manchester).

== Governmental positions ==
- Chairman of the Financial Supervision Commission, 1999–2001
- Minister of Home Affairs, 2001–05
- Chairman of the Communications Commission, 2001–05
- Minister of Transport, 2005–06
