= Department for Enterprise (Isle of Man) =

Isle of Man government agency

Department of Enterprise
Department overview
- Formed: 1 April 2010
- Preceding Department: Various functions from Department of Trade and Industry, Department of Tourism and Leisure, Isle of Man Treasury and Department of Education.
- Jurisdiction: Isle of Man
- Headquarters: 1st Floor, St. George's Court, Upper Church Street Douglas, Isle of Man
- Employees: 227
- Annual budget: GBP34.4m for 2011-2012
- Minister responsible: Robert Cowell, Minister for Enterprise
- Department executive: Mark Lewin, Chief Executive Officer
- Website: www.iomdfenterprise.im

The Department for Enterprise (Rheynn Gastid Dellal) is one of eight departments of the Isle of Man Government. It was created on 1 April 2010 as the Department for Economic Development, largely replacing the former Department of Trade and Industry as well as taking on the tourism function from the former Department of Tourism and Leisure and several other functions from the Isle of Man Treasury and the former Department of Education.

The department was renamed as the Department for Enterprise in November 2017 under Statutory Document No. 2017/0325.

The current Minister for Enterprise is Robert Cowell.

== Functions ==
Executive Agencies

- Finance Isle of Man
- Visit Isle of Man
- Digital Isle of Man
- Business Isle of Man

Registries

- Isle of Man Central Registry
- Isle of Man Aircraft Registry
- Isle of Man Ship Registry

Strategy & Policy

- Locate Isle of Man
- Economic Development
- Work Permits

=== Non Governmental Agencies reporting to the Department ===
- Isle of Man Post Office

== Ministers for Enterprise ==
- Robert Cowell MHK, October 2026 - present
- Tim Johnston MHK, February 2023 - September 2026
- Lawrie Hooper MHK, September 2022 - February 2023
- Alfred Cannan MHK, July 2022 - September 2022
- Tim Crookall MHK, June 2022 - July 2022
- Alfred Cannan MHK, May 2022 - June 2022
- Alex Allinson MHK, Oct 2021 – May 2022
- Laurence Skelly MHK, 2017-2021

== Ministers for Economic Development ==
- Laurence Skelly MHK, 2014–17
- John Shimmin MHK, 2011–14
- Allan Bell MHK, 2010–11
