= Percy Radcliffe =

Manx politician (1916–1991)

Percy Radcliffe CBE (14 November 1916 – December 1991) was a Member of the Legislative Council of the Isle of Man, and Chairman of the Executive Council from 1971 until 1977, and from 1981 to 1985. He was also the Chairman of the Finance Board in the 1970s. He was appointed CBE in the 1985 Birthday Honours.
