= Edgar Mann =

British politician (1926 – 2013)

Lieutenant Colonel Edgar Mann MB

Chairman of the Executive Council
- Monarch: Elizabeth II
- Governor: Nigel Cecil
- Preceded by: Percy Radcliffe
- Succeeded by: Miles Walker

Personal details
- Born: 24 June 1926 London, England, UK
- Died: 21 June 2013 (aged 86) Douglas, Isle of Man
- Party: Independent
- Spouse(s): Joan Redstone (m. 1951)
- Children: 7
- Profession: Politician

Lieutenant Colonel Edgar John Mann MB (24 June 1926 – 21 June 2013) was a British politician, and Chairman of the Executive Council of the Isle of Man, the then head of the island's Government.

== Early life and career ==
Born on 24 June 1926 in London, he was educated at the Friern Barnet Grammar School and King's College London. He went on to become a Medical Officer, a general practitioner and a lieutenant colonel in the RAMC, commanding field ambulances in the Territorial Army (TA).

On 9 July 1950, he was commissioned in Royal Army Medical Corps as a lieutenant to undertake his National Service. He was promoted to captain on 9 July 1951. He transferred to the TA on 2 August 1952. He was promoted to major 15 December 1958. Already an acting lieutenant colonel, he transferred to the Territorial Army Reserve of Officers on 15 January 1963, thereby ending his active service, and was granted the honorary rank of lieutenant colonel.

Upon moving to the Isle of Man, he became a village commissioner (similar to a parish councillor) at Laxey in 1974, before standing for the House of Keys for Garff in 1976. He was immediately appointed chairman of various government Boards (forerunners to the Departments). In 1981, he became Chair of the Finance Board, in effect the Treasury Minister, and then in 1985 was elevated to the Legislative Council and became Chairman of the Executive Council. In 1986, the ministerial system was brought in following the General Election. Dr Mann decided to stand for the House of Keys, as he knew ministers would be expected to be democratically accountable. He also resigned his seat in the Legislative Council on the eve of the election, although this was not legally required. He was not elected, and thus lost his seat in Tynwald, despite being favoured to become the new Chief Minister. At the 1990 by-election, he regained his Garff seat and held it until he was re-elevated to the Legislative Council in 1995. In 1992, he became acting Speaker of the House of Keys and in 1996 Minister of Education.

== Personal life ==
Mann was married to Joan (née Redstone) from 1951; they had five sons and two daughters together, as well as 16 grandchildren. Mann died on 21 June 2013 and his funeral was held in the Lonan Parish Church in the Isle of Man.

== Governmental positions ==
- Chairman of the Broadcasting Commission, 1978–80
- Member of the Executive Council of the Isle of Man, 1980–86
- Chairman of the Board of Agriculture and Fisheries, 1980–81
- Chairman of the Finance Board, 1981–85
- Chairman of the Financial Supervision Commission, 1983–85
- Chairman of the Executive Council, 1985–86
- Minister of Education, 1996–99.
