= Phil Gawne =

Manx politician and language activist

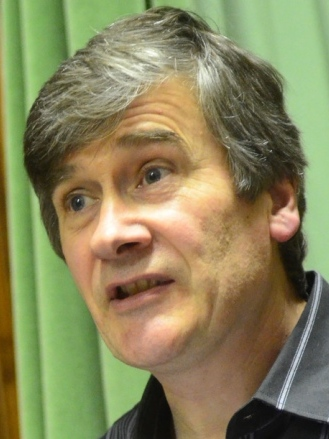
- Gawne in 2014
- Born: Philip Anderson Gawne; 19 February 1965 (age 61); Douglas, Isle of Man
- Education: Arbory Primary School; Castle Rushen High School; University of Liverpool
- Occupation: Former Politician
- Years active: 2001–2016
- Employer: Isle of Man Government
- Spouse: Catherine Kissack (m. 1991)
- Children: 2

Philip Anderson Gawne (born 19 February 1965) is a former Member of the House of Keys for Rushen, a constituency in the Isle of Man.

== Personal life ==
Gawne was born in Douglas to C. R. Gawne CP and E. Gawne (née Anderson). He attended his local primary school in Arbory, before joining Castle Rushen High School for his secondary education. As a young adult, Gawne moved to Liverpool to study Biochemistry in the University of Liverpool. On his return to the Isle of Man, he retrained as a chartered accountant.

Gawne has been married to Catherine (née Kissack) since 1991; they have two children and live in the hamlet of Surby, near Port Erin in the south of the island.

== Politics ==
Gawne has been involved with nationalist politics for much of his political career. In the 1980s he was a member of Mec Vannin, a small political party aimed at gaining full independence and establishing the Isle of Man as an independent sovereign state.

During the 1980s he was involved with a nationalist campaign that ended with an arson attack on an uncompleted luxury home in Tromode, Douglas. In 1988 he was sent to prison for 16 months, serving 8 months, for his part in this arson attack.

Gawne first became a Member of the House of Keys in 2003. He served as Minister of Agriculture, Fisheries and Forestry from 2005 until 2010, then as Minister for Infrastructure 2010–11 and 2014–16, and also as Minister for the Environment, Food and Agriculture 2011–14.

Following constituency boundary changes to the Isle of Man's political map, Gawne contested the newly formed Arbory, Castletown & Malew constituency at the 2016 Manx General Election. The seat was contested by a total of seven candidates with Gawne polling the third highest number of votes, thus losing his parliamentary seat. The contest was close, with Gawne losing by a total of 19 votes after two recounts.

== Manx language ==
Gawne is a fluent speaker of the Manx language and has been involved with the Manx language for decades. He served as the Manx Language Development Officer (Yn Greinneyder), and was the chairman of Culture Vannin (Manx Heritage Foundation) from 2004 to 2016. In 1996, Gawne also helped to found Feailley Ghaelgagh (Manx Language Festival), following a research trip to Scottish Gaelic development agencies in Inverness and the Isle of Skye. Feailley Ghaelgagh was later renamed The Cooish.

Gawne was instrumental in passing the 2001 Education Act that allowed for the Manx language to be taught on the island's schools:

I believe this is one of the things that I’ve been pretty strong on, if not the main person, it was getting Manx history, language and culture into the 2001 Education Act. Everybody from Mona Douglas right back to A. W. Moore had been trying to get culture and language and history taught in the schools. And everyone had failed. But the 2001 Act we actually finally got in a clause that required, as part of our curriculum, for these things to be taught.

Gawne is a director of Mooinjer Veggey, the Manx language pre-school organisation that aims to provide pre-school education with and through the Manx language. Mooinjer Veggey also contributes to the running of the Manx language primary school, Yn Bunscoill Ghaelgagh in St John's on the Isle of Man.
