= Dudley Butt =

Manx politician

Dudley Butt MLC (born 1946) was a Member of the Legislative Council and Tynwald in the Isle of Man. He is a former Detective Chief Inspector of the Isle of Man Constabulary.

== Early life and education ==
Dudley Michael William Butt is the son of Roger and Mary Butt. Butt attended Laxey Primary School and Ramsey Grammar School. He has an International Compliance Diploma and is a member of the International Compliance Association.

== Career ==
Dudley Butt joined the Isle of Man Constabulary in 1962 and he held various positions, mostly in CID, but also as a Court Prosecutor, and retired after 39 years service in 2001 with the rank of Detective Chief Inspector.

Dudley Butt was elected as a member of the Isle of Man Legislative Council and Tynwald, the Isle of Man Parliament in February 2005. During his time on the Council and as a member of Tynwald, Mr Butt has served as a member of the Department of Agriculture, Fisheries & Forestry, the Department of Trade & Industry, the Department of Local Government and the Environment, with responsibility for Waste Management and Recycling; the Department of Health and Social Security with responsibility for Social Services, the Department of Education, and Department of Tourism and Leisure. Dudley Butt was also until 2011 Chairman of the Whitley Council

In February 2010 at the conclusion of his first five years in Tynwald he was re-elected.

He became the political member with responsibility for the Health in the Department of Health and Social Care where he served for five years., Between 2009 and 2012 he was also the political member for the Department of Education and Children with responsibility for Children's Services and Special Needs. He resigned from the department in 2012 after disagreeing with the then minister Peter Karran's proposal to close pre-school nurseries and the Education Department Family Library.

His other roles in Government were as Children's Champion for Looked After Children, Chair of the Corporate Parenting Group, Chair of the Sport and Healthy Schools Partnership, and Chair of the Clinical Recommendations Committee.

His Parliamentary duties included being a member on the Select Committee investigating the affairs of the Manx Electricity Authority, a member of the Economic Scrutiny Committee, the Chair of the Environment and Infrastructure Scrutiny Committee, a member of the Public Accounts Committee for nine years and a member of the Tynwald Standards Committee.

Dudley Butt did not stand for re election for a third term in 2015 and retired from politics. He continued to work as the Children's Champion until November 2016.

Dudley Butt is the President of Laxey Football Club, having played for and represented the Club for many years, and captained the Police Cricket Team for a number of years. He is a regular competitor and finisher in the annual Isle of Man 85 mile Parish Walk. His interests include motorcycling, race walking, and writing.
