= Department of Environment, Food and Agriculture (Isle of Man) =

Department overview
- Formed: 1 April 2010
- Preceding Department: Department of Agriculture, Fisheries and Forestry and environment function of Department of Local Government and the Environment
- Jurisdiction: Isle of Man
- Headquarters: Thie Slieau Whallian, Foxdale Road, St Johns, Isle of Man
- Employees: 157
- Annual budget: GBP 15.2m for 2011-2012
- Minister responsible: Clare Barber MHK, Minister for Environment, Food and Agriculture
- Department executive: Richard Lole, Chief Executive Officer
- Website: www.gov.im/defa

The Department of Environment, Food and Agriculture is one of nine departments of the Isle of Man Government. It was created on 1 April 2010, taking over the former Department of Agriculture, Fisheries and Forestry along with the environment functions from the former Department of Local Government and the Environment.

The current Minister for Environment, Food and Agriculture is Clare Barber MHK.

== Functions ==
- Agriculture
- Animal Health
- Forestry
- Fisheries
- Biodiversity
- Protection of the Countryside
- Environmental Protection and Improvements
- Climate Change
- Coastline Protection Policy and Monitoring
- Waste Regulation
- Food Safety
- Environmental Public Health Government Analyst

== Ministers for Environment, Food and Agriculture ==
- Clare Barber MHK, 12 August 2021 - Present.
- Geoffrey Boot MHK, 13 October 2016 – 12 August 2021
- Richard Ronan MHK, 2 July 2014 – 12 October 2016
- Phil Gawne MHK, 14 October 2011 – 1 July 2014
- John Shimmin MHK, 1 April 2010 – 13 October 2011
