= Eddie Teare =

Manx politician (born 1948)

- Born: William Edward Teare; 10 May 1948 (age 78); Isle of Man
- Education: Kirk Andreas Primary School; Ramsey Grammar School
- Occupation: Politician
- Years active: 2004–2016
- Employer(s): Isle of Man Bank (1965–2004); Isle of Man Government (2004–present)
- Spouse: Irene Craig
- Children: 2

William Edward "Eddie" Teare, (born 10 May 1948) is a Manx politician, who was the Minister of the Treasury from 2011 to 2016 after holding other ministerial positions. He was MHK (Member of the House of Keys) for Ayre from 2004 to 2016, having first been elected to the House in a 2004 by-election. He was educated at Ramsey Grammar School.

He is an associate of the Chartered Institute of Bankers and has a distinction in the Finance of Foreign Trade. He worked for the Isle of Man Bank from 1965 to 2004, rising to risk manager and senior relationship manager. He has also worked as a conveyancing manager at Laurence Keenan Advocates.

== Governmental positions ==
- Chairman of the Manx Electricity Authority, 2005–07
- Minister of Health and Social Security, 2006–10
- Minister for Education and Children, 2010–11
- Minister of the Treasury, 2011–16
