= James Cain (Manx politician) =

Manx politician

The Honourable James Crookall Cain FCA (19 March 1927 – 5 May 2019) was a Manx politician, who was the Speaker of the House of Keys and former Minister of the Isle of Man Government and Member of the House of Keys for the constituency of Douglas West.

Cain was elected as MHK in 1986 and re-elected in 1991. Formerly he was a Chartered Accountant and Partner at Pannell Kerr Forster.

Cain became acting Speaker of the House of Keys in 1990, before taking on the role permanently in 1991. He served until 1999.

Jim Cain was born on 19 March 1927, and died on 5 May 2019, at the age of 92.

== Governmental position ==
- Chairman of the Insurance Authority, 1987-1988
- Minister of Health and Social Security, 1989–1991
