= Bernie May (politician) =

British entrepreneur and politician (born 1941)

- Born: Bernard May; 6 July 1941 (age 85); Hyde, (then Cheshire, now Greater Manchester), England
- Occupation: Politician
- Years active: 1985–present
- Employer: Isle of Man Government
- Spouse: Carol Mander (m. 1969)
- Children: 3 daughters

Bernard May MHK (born 6 July 1941) is a Manx politician and entrepreneur, who was a Member of the House of Keys in the Isle of Man and Government Minister.

== Early life and career ==
Born on 6 July 1941 to Harry Turner May and Lilian Freda (née Nicholl) in Hyde, Cheshire, he was raised on the Isle of Man and educated at Douglas High School. He later went on to own and operate a taxi company on the island and was also a member of Douglas Town Council before he was elected as a Member of the House of Keys for Douglas North in 1985 for the Manx Labour Party. He was re-elected in 1986 and 1991 before losing to John Houghton in 1996, following which he became a bus driver. In 1998, he unsuccessfully stood again.

== Personal life ==
He has been married to Carol (née Mander) since 1969, and they have 3 children together.

== Governmental positions ==
- Chairman of Isle of Man Post Office, 1986–88
- Minister of Industry, 1988–91
- Minister of Health and Social Security, 1991–96
