= Arnold Callin =

Alured Arnold Callin (25 August 1924 – 29 June 2015) was a Manx politician who served as a Member of the Legislative Council of the Isle of Man.

He was born in August 1924 and educated at Peel Clothworkers' School. He served in the Royal Navy during the Second World War and then became a businessman and auctioneer on the Isle of Man. Between 1956 and 1976 he served on Onchan Commissioners, twice being chairman.

In 1976 he was elected MHK for Middle. He was elevated to the legislative council in 1985 and served until standing down in 1995. He held many positions with government including minister of home affairs. He died in June 2015 at the age of 90.

== Governmental positions ==
- Chairman of the Civil Service Commission, 1976–1981
- Chairman of the Health Services Board, 1981–1986
- Minister of Highways, Ports & Properties, 1986–1991
- Minister of Home Affairs, 1991–1995
