= Isle of Man Government =

Government of the Isle of Man

Coordinates: 54°09′06.6″N 4°28′48.6″W

The Isle of Man Government (Manx: Reiltys Ellan Vannin) is the government of the Isle of Man. The formal head of the Isle of Man Government is the Lieutenant Governor, the personal representative of the Lord of Mann (currently Charles III). The executive head is the Chief Minister.

Douglas, the capital city in the Isle of Man, home to the seat of government, is where most Government offices and the parliament chambers (Tynwald) are located.

The Civil Service has more than 2,000 employees and the total number of public sector employees including civil servants, teachers, nurses, police, etc. was 7,413 full-time equivalent on 31 March 2019. This is just under 10% of the population of the Island and 21% of the working population. This does not include any military forces, as defence is the constitutional responsibility of the United Kingdom.

== Structure ==
The Government consists of eight departments, seven statutory boards, and numerous other governmental and quasi-independent agencies. The departments all report directly to the Council of Ministers through their respective minister. Departments 'sponsor' other public bodies to enable a conduit into the Council of Ministers. This arrangement extends to Tynwald and its branches for public bodies that do not have a member of Tynwald on their board.

- Council of Ministers
  - Attorney General's Chambers
  - General Registry (Isle of Man Courts and Tribunals)
  - Isle of Man Information Commissioner
  - Manx Industrial Relations Service (MIRS)
- Cabinet Office
  - Public Services Commission
  - Safeguarding Board
- Department of Education, Sport and Culture
  - Culture Vannin (Manx Heritage Foundation)
  - Isle of Man Arts Council
  - Isle of Man Sport (Isle of Man Sports Council)
  - Swimming Pool Authorities
- Department for Enterprise
  - Isle of Man Post Office
  - Manx National Heritage (Manx Museum and National Trust)
- Department of Environment, Food and Agriculture
  - Isle of Man Office of Fair Trading
  - Planning Committee
  - Road Transport and Licensing Committee
- Department of Health and Social Care
  - Manx Care
- Department of Home Affairs
  - Communications and Utilities Regulatory Authority
  - Financial Intelligence Unit
- Department of Infrastructure
  - Manx Utilities Authority
  - Local government
- The Treasury
  - Isle of Man Financial Services Authority
  - Isle of Man Gambling Supervision Commission
  - Manx Lottery Trust
  - Public Sector Pensions Authority

== Personnel ==
=== Departments ===
Chief Minister of the Isle of Man: Chris Thomas MHK

Chief Executive of Isle of Man Government: Mark Lewin

- Cabinet Office (Oik Coonceil ny Shirveishee)
  - Minister for the Cabinet Office: Chris Thomas MHK
  - Chief Operating Officer: Dr Megan Mathias MBE
- Department of Education, Sport and Culture (Rheynn Ynsee Spoyrt as Cultoor)
  - Minister for Education, Sport and Culture (Shirveishagh son Ynsee Spoyrt as Cultoor): Sarah Maltby MHK
  - Chief Officer: Graham Kinrade
- Department for Enterprise (Rheynn Gastid Dellal)
  - Minister for Enterprise (Shirveishagh son Gastid Dellal): Robert Cowell MHK
  - Chief Officer: Andy Stewart
- Department of Environment, Food and Agriculture (Rheynn Chymmyltaght, Bee as Eirinys)
  - Minister for Environment, Food and Agriculture (Shirveishagh son Chymmyltaght, Bee as Eirinys): Dr Rachel Glover MHK
  - Chief Officer: Tim Cowsill
- Department of Health and Social Care (Rheynn Slaynt as Kiarail y Theay)
  - Minister for Health and Social Care (Shirveishagh son Slaynt as Kiarail y Theay): Claire Christian MHK
  - Chief Officer: Professor Tim O'Neill
- Department of Home Affairs (Rheynn Cooishyn Sthie)
  - Minister for Justice and Home Affairs (Shirveishagh son Jeerys as Cooishyn Sthie): Jane Poole-Wilson MHK
  - Chief Officer: Dan Davies
- Department of Infrastructure (Rheynn Bun-troggalys)
  - Minister for Infrastructure (Shirveishagh son Bun-troggalys): Jason Moorhouse MHK
  - Chief Office: Emily Curphey
- The Treasury (Yn Tashtee)
  - Minister for the Treasury (Shirveishagh Tashtee): Michael Crowe MHK
  - Chief Financial Officer: Caldric Randall

=== Statutory boards ===
- Communications and Utilities Regulatory Authority (Lught-reill son Gurneil Chellinsh as Bun-shirveishyn)
  - Chair: Shirley Corlett
  - Non-voting Member of Tynwald: Ann Corlett
  - Chief Executive: Ivan Kiely
- Isle of Man Financial Services Authority (Lught-Reill Shirveishyn Argidoil Ellan Vannin)
  - Chair: Lillian Boyle
  - Chief Executive: Bettina Roth
- Isle of Man Gambling Supervision Commission
  - Chair: Gregory Pitts
  - Deputy Chair: Kevin Wilson
  - Chief Executive: Mark Rutherford
- Isle of Man Office of Fair Trading (Oik Dellal Cair Ellan Vannin)
  - Chair: Tim Glover
  - Vice Chair: Paul Craine MLC
- Isle of Man Post Office (Oik Postagh Ellan Vannin)
  - Chair: Stu Peters
  - Vice Chair: Diane Kelsey MLC
  - Chief Executive: Simon Kneen
- Manx Care (Kiarail Vannin)
  - Chair: Professor Wendy Reid
  - Chief Executive: Dr Chris Stockport
- Manx Utilities Authority (Bun Shirveishyn Vannin)
  - Chair (interim): Peter Greenhill MLC
  - Vice Chair: Peter Greenhill MLC
  - Chief Executive: Philip King
- Public Sector Pensions Authority
  - Chair: Ian Murray
  - Vice Chair and employer representative: Rob Callister MHK (ex-officio as Chair of the Public Services Commission)
  - Employer representative: Rob Mercer MLC (ex-officio as Vice Chair of the Public Services Commission)
  - Chief Executive: Kathryn Brondon

=== Offices ===
- Attorney General's Chambers
  - HM Attorney General: Walter Wannenburgh KC
  - HM Solicitor General: Elizabeth Smith
- General Registry (Isle of Man Courts and Tribunals)
  - Chief Registrar: Dr Stuart Quayle
- Isle of Man Information Commissioner (Barrantagh Fysseree)
  - Information Commissioner: Dr Alexandra Delaney-Bhattacharya

=== Other agencies ===
- Culture Vannin (Manx Heritage Foundation)
  - Chair: Chris Thomas MHK
  - Vice Chair: Daphne Caine
  - Director: Dr Breesha Maddrell
- Financial Intelligence Unit (Unnid Tushtag Argidoil)
  - Chair: HM Attorney General
  - Director: Ian MacMillan
- Isle of Man Arts Council
  - Chair: Sarah Maltby MHK
- Isle of Man Sport (Isle of Man Sports Council)
  - Executive Chair: Sarah Corlett
- Manx Industrial Relations Service
- Manx Lottery Trust
  - Chair: Sarah Kelly
- Manx National Heritage (Manx Museum and National Trust)
  - Chair: Jonathan Hall
  - Executive Director: Connie Lovel
- Public Services Commission
  - Chair: Rob Callister MHK
  - Vice Chair: Rob Mercer MLC
  - Secretary: Grace Eames
- Road Transport Licensing Committee (Bing Kied Carbid)
  - Chair: Graham Curphey
- Safeguarding Board
  - Independent Chair: Lesley Walker
- Swimming Pool Authorities
- Local Government

== Brief history ==
=== Lieutenant governor ===
Before modern times the government of the Isle of Man was in the hands of the Governor (or Lieutenant Governor), who was the representative of the Lord of Man, assisted by his Council, consisting of the other permanent officials (the Bishop, Archdeacon, Deemsters, Attorney General, etc.). The Council evolved into the Legislative Council, the upper chamber of Tynwald, the parliament of the Isle of Man.

After the Revestment in 1765, the Lieutenant Governor and his officials were the agents of the British Government, and not democratically responsible to the Manx people. Conflict between the House of Keys (popularly elected after 1866) and the Lieutenant Governor came to a head during the tenure of the 3rd Baron Raglan (1902–18).

=== Council of Ministers ===
After the First World War, the Lieutenant Governor gradually ceded control to Tynwald, a process guided by the reports of commissions and other bodies in 1911, 1959 and 1969. An Executive Council, chaired by him and including members of Tynwald, was established in 1949, and gradually thereafter became the effective government of the Island. Finance and the police came under local control between 1958 and 1976. The Lieutenant Governor ceased to chair the Executive Council in 1980, being replaced by a chairman elected by Tynwald, and the council was reconstituted in 1985 to include the chairmen of the eight principal Boards; in 1986 they were given the title 'Minister' and the chairman was styled 'Chief Minister'. In 1990 the council was renamed the 'Council of Ministers'.

=== Departments ===
During the 19th century several bodies, which came to be known as 'Boards of Tynwald', were created to exercise functions under democratic control. These included the Board of Education (1872), Highway Board (1874), Asylums Board (1888), Government Property Trustees (1891) and Local Government Board (1894). However, although direct taxation was levied by Tynwald, the Boards' freedom of action before the 1960s was limited by the Lieutenant Governor's control of the Island's budget and his power to appoint certain of their members.

The structure of the Boards of Tynwald, along with other bodies variously called 'Statutory Boards' and 'Commercial Boards', became increasingly unwieldy after the 1950s, and was eventually reformed in the 1980s, when a system of 'ministerial government' was set up.

The Departments and Statutory Boards which existed before the reorganisation in 2010, and their predecessors, are shown below:

- Treasury, 1985–present
  - Finance Board, 1961–1985
- Department of Agriculture, Fisheries and Forestry, 1986–2010
  - Board of Agriculture and Fisheries, 1946–86
    - Board of Agriculture, 1914–1946
    - Fisheries Board, 1927–1946
      - Fishery Conservators, 1882–1927
  - Forestry, Mines and Lands Board, 1950–86
    - Common Lands Board, 1915–50
      - Trustees of the Common Lands, 1866–1915
- Department of Education, 1987–2010
  - Isle of Man Board of Education, 1946–2009 (Note: The Board continued in existence as a popularly elected body, but with reduced functions, after the Department of Education was created in 1987; it was not finally dissolved until June 2009.)
    - Board of Education, 1872–99
    - Council of Education, 1899–1946
    - Isle of Man Education Authority, 1923–68
      - Isle of Man Central Education Authority, 1920–23
- Department of Health and Social Security, 1986–2010
  - Health Services Board, 1948–86
    - Mental Hospital Board, 1932–48
      - Asylums Board, 1888–1932
  - Board of Social Security, 1970–86
    - Board of Social Services, 1946–70
      - Health Insurance and Pensions Board, 1939–46
        - Old Age Pensions and National Health Insurance Board, 1920–39
- Department of Transport, 2004–2010
  - Department of Highways, Ports and Properties 1986–2004
    - Isle of Man Highway and Transport Board, 1946–86
      - Highway Board, 1874–1946
        - Committee of Highways, 1776–1874
    - Isle of Man Harbour Board, 1948–86
      - Isle of Man Harbour Commissioners, 1872–1948
        - Commissioners for Harbours, 1771–1872
    - Isle of Man Airports Board, 1948–86
    - Government Property Trustees, 1891–1986
- Department of Home Affairs, since 1986
  - Home Affairs Board, 1981–86
    - Isle of Man Police Board, 1962–81
    - Isle of Man Broadcasting Commission, 1965–81
    - Civil Defence Commission, 1955–81
- Department of Trade and Industry, 1996–2010
  - Department of Industry, 1986–1996
    - Industry Board, 1981–86
- Department of Local Government and the Environment, 1986–2010
  - Local Government Board, 1894–1986
- Department of Tourism and Leisure, 1994–2010
  - Department of Tourism and Transport, 1986–2004
    - Tourist Board, 1952–86
      - Publicity Board, 1931–52
        - Board of Advertising, 1904–31
          - Advertising Committee, 1897–1904
    - Isle of Man Passenger Transport Board, 1982–86
      - Manx Electric Railway Board, 1957–82
- Isle of Man Office of Fair Trading, since 1998
  - Board of Consumer Affairs (1981–1998)
    - Consumer Council (1972–1981)
- Financial Supervision Commission, since 1982
- Insurance and Pensions Authority, since 1996
  - Insurance Authority, 1986–96
- Isle of Man Post Office (1993)
  - Isle of Man Post Office Authority (1972–93)
- Isle of Man Water and Sewerage Authority, since 2010
  - Isle of Man Water Authority (1985–2010)
    - Isle of Man Water and Gas Authority (1974–1985)
      - Isle of Man Water Authority (1972–1974)
      - Isle of Man Gas Authority (1972–1974)
      - Isle of Man Water Board (1946–1972)
- Manx Electricity Authority, since 1983
  - Isle of Man Electricity Board (1932–1984)
- Communications Commission (1989)
  - Telecommunications Commission (1985–1989)
- Gambling Supervision Commission, up to present
