= Geography of the Isle of Man =

Isle of Man
Ellan Vannin (Manx)
- Topographic map of the Isle of Man

- Location within British Isles

Geography
- Location: Northwestern Europe
- Coordinates: 54°15′N 4°30′W
- Archipelago: British Isles
- Adjacent to: Irish Sea
- Area: 572 km^{2} (221 sq mi)
- Coastline: 160 km (99 mi)
- Highest elevation: 621 m (2037 ft)
- Highest point: Snaefell

Administration
- Isle of Man
- Largest town: Douglas (pop. 23,000)

Demographics
- Population: 79,805 (2006)
- Pop. density: 139.52/km^{2} (361.36/sq mi)
- Ethnic groups: Manx

The Isle of Man is an island in the Irish Sea, between Great Britain and Ireland in Northern Europe, with a population of almost 85,000. It is a British Crown dependency. It has a small islet, the Calf of Man, to its south. It is located at 54°15′N 4°30′W.

== Dimensions ==
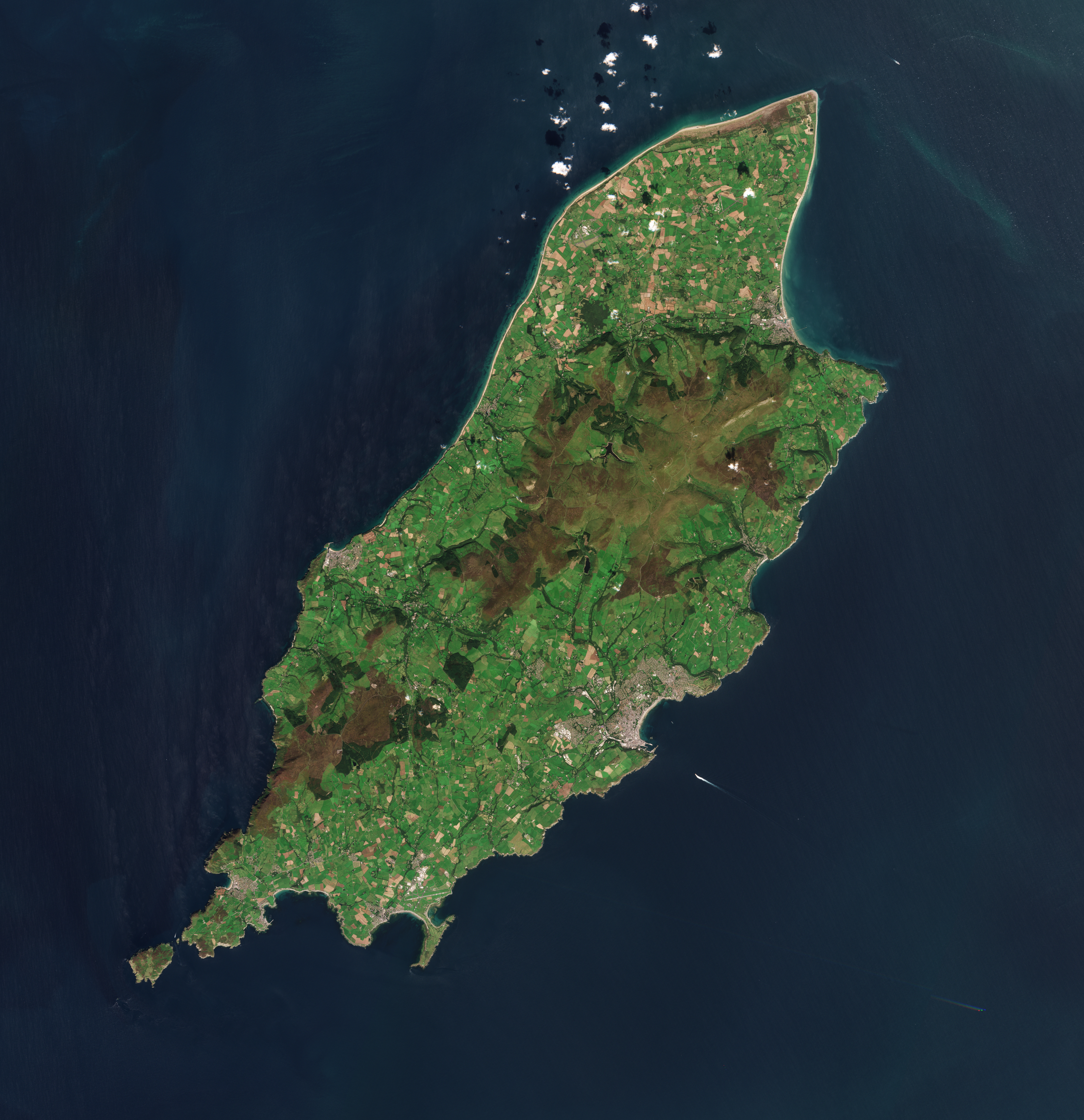
Satellite image

Area:

Land: 571 km^{2} (220 sq mi; 57,100 ha)
Water: 1 km^{2} (0.4 sq mi) (100 ha)
Total: 572 km^{2} (221 sq mi; 57,200 ha)

This makes it:

- slightly more than three times the size of Washington, D.C.
- slightly more than one-third the size of Hertfordshire
- slightly smaller than Saint Lucia.

== Coast and territorial sea ==
The Isle of Man has a coastline of 160 km (99 mi), and a territorial sea extending to a maximum of 12 nm from the coast, or the midpoint between it and other countries. The total territorial sea area is about 4000 km^{2} or 1500 sq miles, which is about 87% of the total area of the jurisdiction of the Isle of Man. The Isle of Man only holds exclusive fishing rights in the first 3 nm. The territorial sea is managed by the Isle of Man Government Department of Infrastructure.

The Raad ny Foillan long-distance footpath runs 153 km (95 mi) around the Manx coast.

== Climate ==
The Isle of Man enjoys a temperate climate, with cool summers and mild winters. Average rainfall is high compared to the majority of the British Isles, due to its location to the western side of Great Britain and sufficient distance from Ireland for moisture to be accumulated by the prevailing south-westerly winds. Average rainfall is highest at Snaefell, where it is around 1,900 mm (74.8 in) a year. At lower levels, it can fall to around 800 mm (31.5 in) a year.

Temperatures remain fairly cool, with the recorded maximum being 28.9 °C (84.0 °F) at Ronaldsway.

== Terrain ==
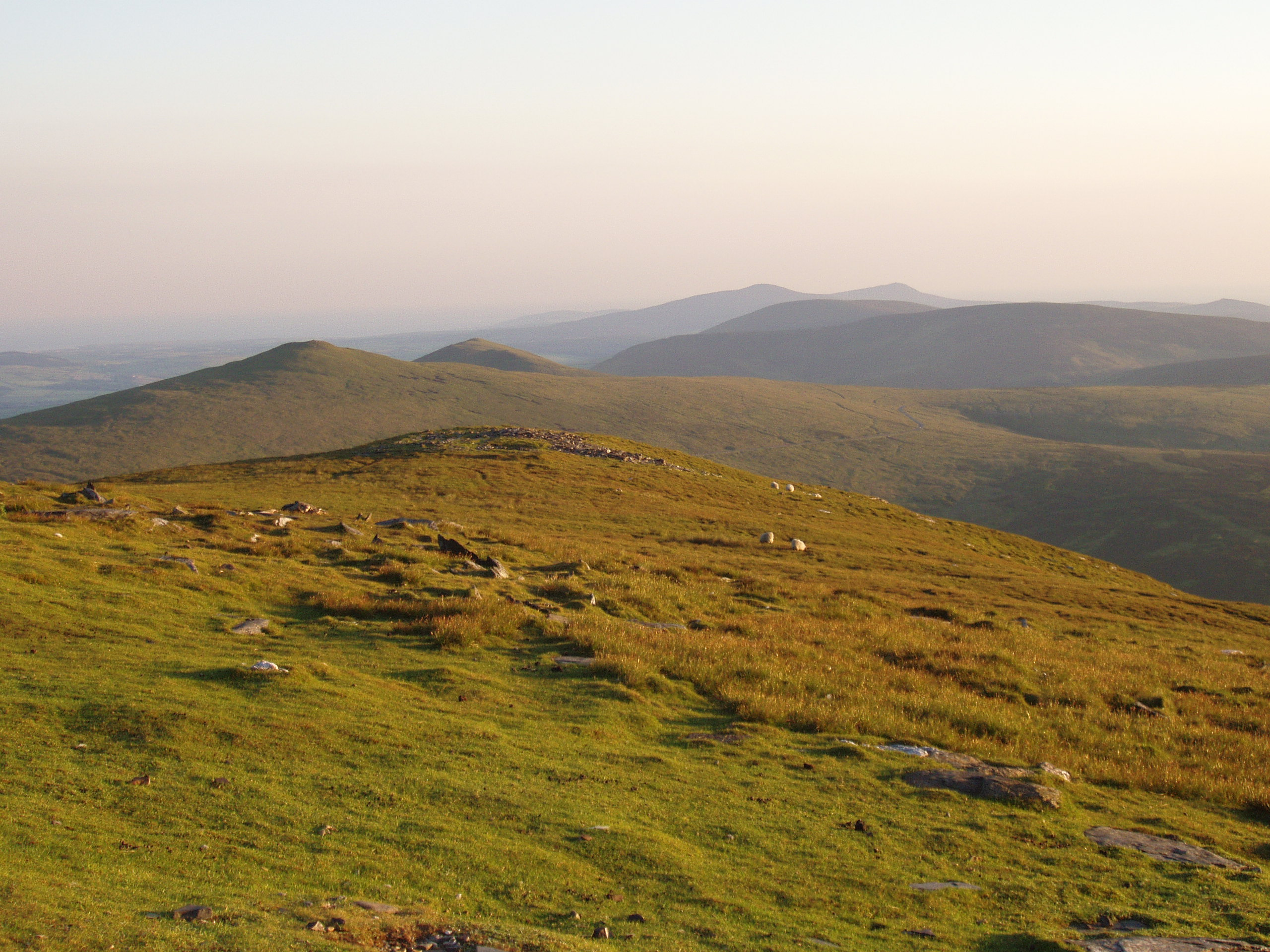
Some of the island's mountainous terrain as viewed from Snaefell, the island's highest peak.

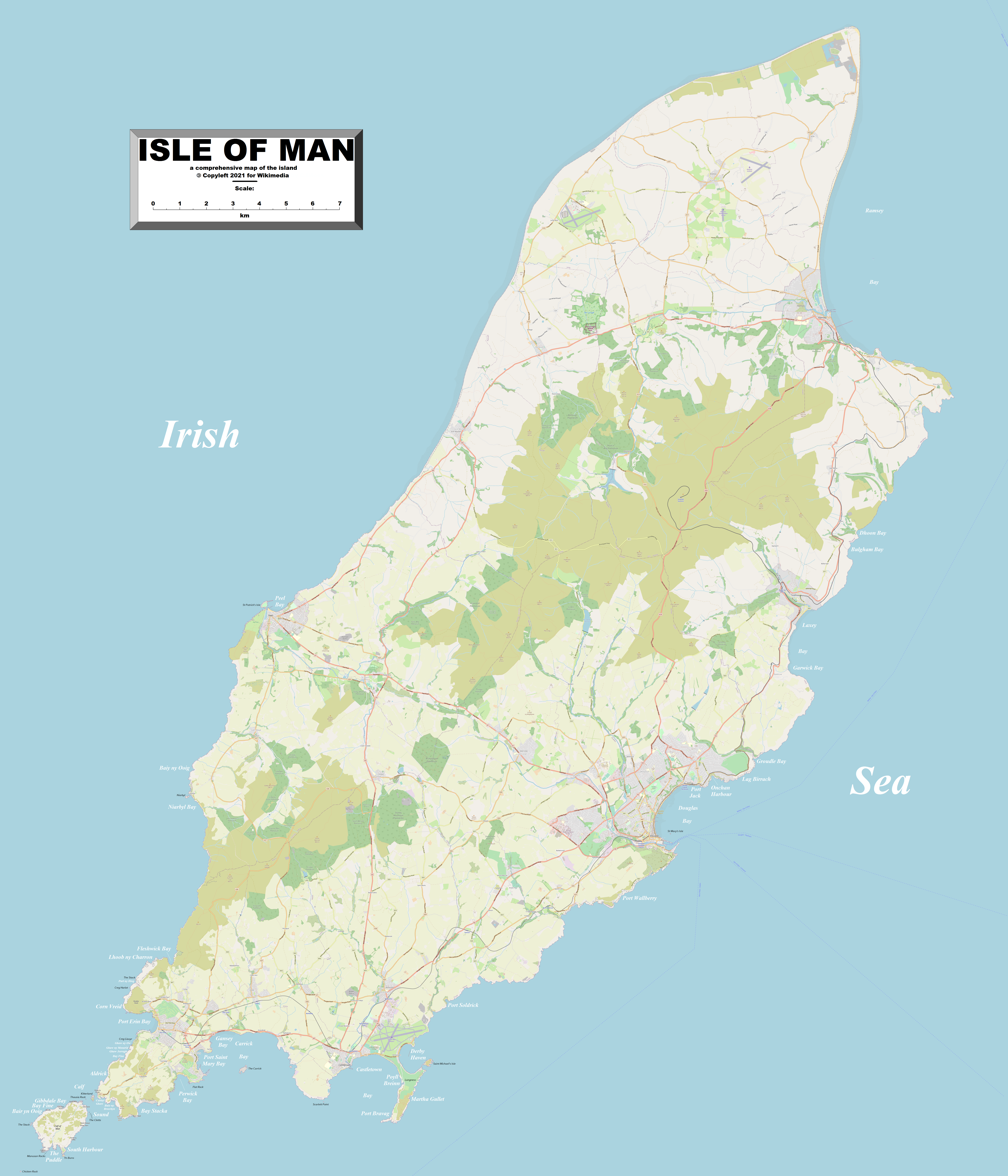
Enlargeable, detailed map of the Isle of Man

The island's terrain is varied. There are two mountainous areas divided by a central valley which runs between Douglas and Peel. The highest point in the Isle of Man, Snaefell, is in the northern area and reaches 620 metres (2,034 ft) above sea level. The northern end of the island is a flat plain, consisting of glacial tills and marine sediments. To the south, the island is more hilly, with distinct valleys. There is no land below sea level.

== Land use ==
- Arable land: 43.86%
- Permanent crops: 0%
- Other: 56.14% (includes permanent pastures, forests, mountain and heathland) (2011)

== Natural hazards and environmental issues ==
There are few severe natural hazards, the most common being high winds, rough seas and dense fog. In recent years there has been a marked increase in the frequency of high winds, heavy rains, summer droughts and flooding both from heavy rain and from high seas. Snow fall has decreased significantly over the past century while temperatures are increasing year-round with rainfall decreasing.

Air pollution, marine pollution and waste disposal are issues in the Isle of Man.

== Protected or recognised sites for nature conservation ==
In order of importance, international first, non-statutory last. Note that ASSIs and MNRs have equal levels of statutory protection under the Wildlife Act 1990.

=== UNESCO Biosphere Reserves ===
- The entire territory of the Isle of Man, including all land, sea, freshwater, airspace and seabed is a UNESCO Biosphere Reserve

=== Ramsar sites ===
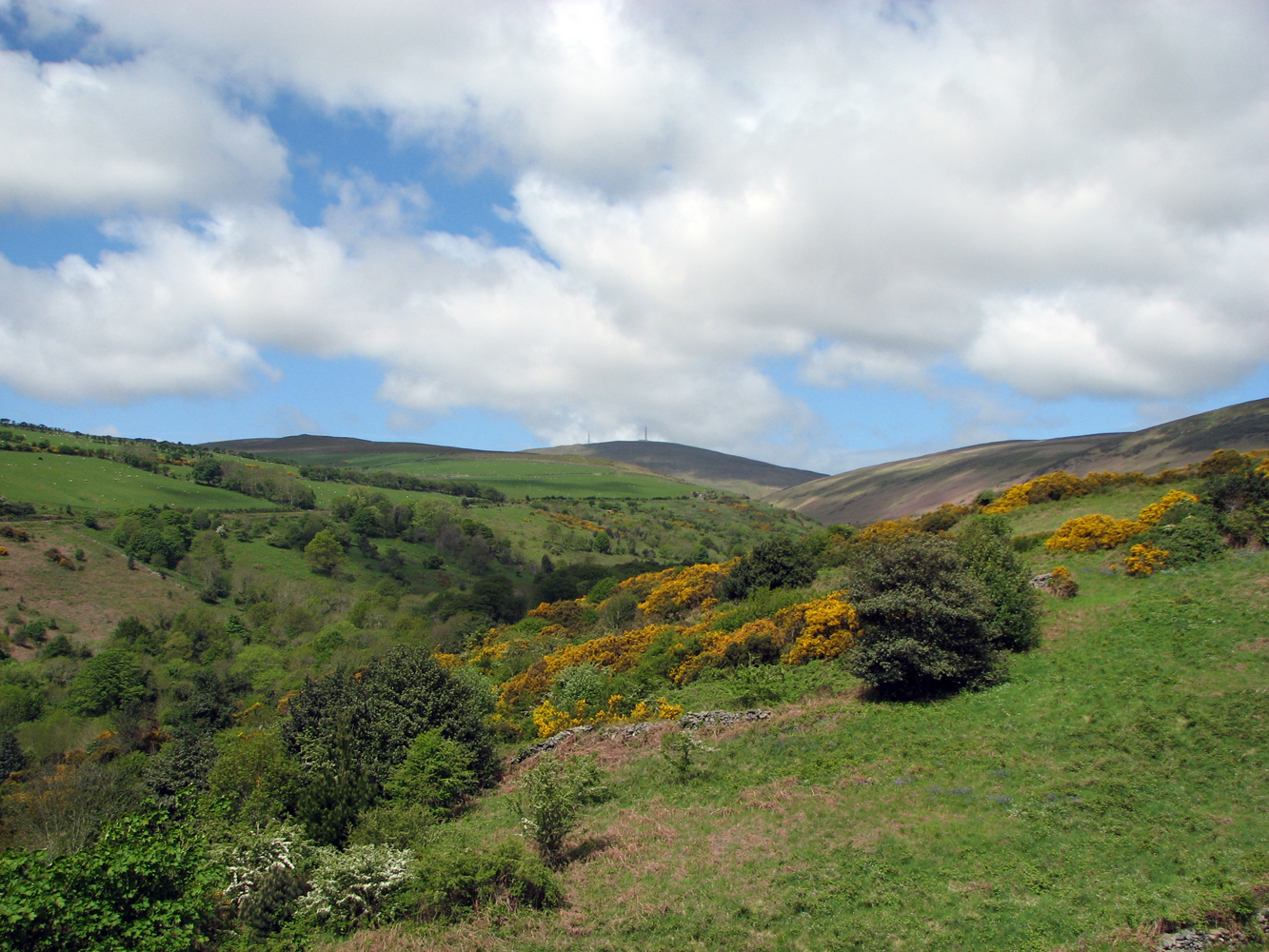
A view up a glen with Snaefell at the head

Designated:

- Ballaugh Curraghs UK21001 (2006, 193.4 ha). Has the same boundaries as the Ballaugh Curraghs ASSI.

Candidate:

- The Ayres UK21002 (Proposed in 2004 & 2005, 600 ha)
- Southern Coasts & Calf of Man UK21003 (Proposed in 2004 & 2005, 2326 ha)
- Central Valley Curragh UK21004 (Proposed in 2004 & 2005, 164 ha)
- Gob ny Rona, Maughold Head & Port Cornaa UK21005 (Proposed in 2004 & 2005, 209 ha)
- Dalby Peatlands UK21006 (Proposed in 2004 & 2005, 58 ha)

=== Important Marine Mammal Areas ===
In 2024, the IUCN Marine Mammal Protected Areas Task Force recognised that 17,610km2 of the central Irish Sea as being of global importance for marine mammals, known as the Central Irish Sea Important Marine Mammal Area. This includes about half of Manx marine territorial waters.

=== Important Shark and Ray Areas ===
Manx territorial waters support are globally important for sharks, skates and rays, with three (one in whole, two in part) globally significant Important Shark and Ray Areas which recognised by the IUCN Shark Specialist Group as follows:

- Calf of Man-Orrisdale ISRA - 205.5km2 for aggregations of Basking Shark Cetorhinus maximus
- Northwest Irish Sea ISRA - 2,476.2km2 for Spurdog Squalus acanthias
- Northeast Atlantic Corridor ISRA - 1,482,885 km2 for Porbeagle Lamna nasus and as migratory routes for Basking Shark Cetorhinus maximus

=== Important Bird Areas ===
The UK RSPB and UK JNCC have designated five areas of the Isle of Man which are of global significance to birdlife.

- Isle of Man Sea Cliffs – 97 km of the east and west coasts
- Calf of Man – 250 ha
- The Ayres – c. 800ha
- Ballaugh Curraghs – 374 ha
- Isle of Man Hills – 8650 ha

=== National Nature Reserves ===
- The Ayres (2000, 272 ha)
- Cronk y Bing (2026, 7.16 ha)

=== Areas of Special Scientific Importance ===
There are 25 ASSIs on the Isle of Man as of November 2022. One additional ASSI has been designated but later rescinded (Ramsey Estuary). Dates below refer to year of formal confirmation.

- Ballachurry Meadows (2010, 11.9 ha)
- Ballacrye Meadow (2005, 0.55 ha)
- Ballateare Meadow (2014, 0.96 ha)
- Ballaugh Curraghs (2005, 193.4 ha)
- Central Ayres (1996, 259.66 ha, extended 2008 by 98.68 ha, total 358.35 ha)
- Cronk y Bing (2006, 17.71 ha, also declared to be a National Nature Reserve on 14th July 2026)
- Cronk y King (2014, extended in 2021 to 3.02 ha)
- Curragh Pharrick (2022, 4.02 ha)
- Dalby Coast (2010, 62.1 ha)
- Dhoon Glen (2007, 20.92 ha)
- Douglas Head (2022)
- Eary Vane (2007, 3.96 ha)
- Glen Maye (2008, 15.92 ha)
- Glen Rushen (2007, 12.27 ha)
- Greeba Mountain & Central Hills (2009, 1,080.95 ha)
- Grenaby Gareys (2021, 74.82 ha)
- Jurby Airfield (2005, 63.04 ha)
- Langness, Derbyhaven & Sandwick (2001, 310 ha)
- Marine Drive (2021, 82.35 ha)
- Maughold Cliffs & Brooghs (2011, 53.63 ha)
- Port St Mary Ledges & Kallow Point (2011, 14.79 ha)
- Poyll Vaaish Coast (2007, 44.76 ha)
- Ramsey Estuary (designated but later rescinded in 2010; 15.8 ha)
- Ramsey Mooragh Shore (2006, 2.65 ha)
- Rosehill Quarry, Billown (2006, 1.37 ha)
- Santon Gorge & Port Soldrick (2012, 24.35 ha)

=== Marine Nature Reserves ===
The Island's first marine nature reserve was designated in Ramsey Bay in October 2011. In 2018, nine further Marine Nature Reserves were given statutory protection. The ten Marine Nature Reserves around the Isle of Man cover over 10% of the country's territorial waters, in accordance with international requirements.

- Ramsey Bay 2011
- Baie ny Carrickey 2018
- Calf and Wart Bank 2018
- Douglas Bay 2018
- Langness 2018
- Laxey Bay 2018
- Little Ness 2018
- Niarbyl Bay 2018
- Port Erin Bay 2018
- West Coast 2018

==== Eelgrass Conservation Zones (Statutory – within MNRs) ====
Eelgrass Zostera marina is a legally protected species on the Isle of Man. Between 2011 and 2018, four strictly protected Eelgrass Conservation Zones have been designated to protect this important species.

- Ramsey Bay MNR - Port Lewaigue & Ballure area (2011)
- Baie ny Carrickey MNR - east of Gansey Point (2018)
- Langness MNR - Fort Island Gully (2018)
- Laxey Bay MNR - east of Gob ny Silvas (2018)

==== Eelgrass Voluntary Zones (Non-statutory – both in and outside MNRs) ====
In 2023, three existing statutory Eelgrass Conservation Zones were expanded on a voluntary basis (noting that, regardless of this 'voluntary' status, the species is still legally fully protected from reckless disturbance), with a further new site identified.

- Ramsey Bay - a considerably larger area than the statutory zone (2023)
- Langness - Derbyhaven Bay, northwest of Fort Island, separate from the Fort Island Gully statutory site (2023)
- Laxey Bay - a considerably larger area than the statutory zone (2023)
- Bulgham Bay - discovered in 2021, the only Eelgrass Voluntary Zone outside of an MNR (2023)

=== Areas of Special Protection ===
- Ayres Gravel Pit designated 2001, 41 hectares. In 2019 this became a nature reserve managed by Manx BirdLife.

=== Bird Sanctuaries ===
Bird sanctuaries were formerly designated by that name under the Wild Birds Protection Act 1932. This designation was superseded by "Areas of Special Protection for Birds" under the Wildlife Act 1990; however, the following formerly designated Bird Sanctuaries remain protected:

- Barnell Reservoir (Patrick) (1979) 0.02 km^{2}
- Tynwald National Park and Arboretum (1982)
- Derbyhaven, Langness and Fort Island and foreshores adjoining (1936)
- Renscault and Ballachrink (West Baldwin) (1978) 0.18 km^{2}
- The Willows (Ballamodha, Malew) (1984) 0.01 km^{2}

=== Registered Heathland ===
Protected from unlicensed burning or destruction by the Heath Burning Act 2003.

- Ballacowin (part DEFA, part private: Glen Ruy, Slieau Lhost Area)
- Ballaugh Mountain (DEFA)
- Beary Mountain (including the Twelve Shares; private, multiple owners)
- Bienn y Phott (DEFA)
- Bradda (part DEFA, part private)
- Calf of Man (MNH)
- Carraghyn (Private)
- Central Hills ASSI (DEFA)
- Creg ny Baa (part DEFA, part private Slieau Lhost and Slieau Meayl)
- Cringle Great Park (DEFA)
- Cronk ny Arrey Laa (DEFA)
- Cross Vein, Watertrough Park and Glen Rushen (DEFA)
- Dalby Mountain (Private, multiple owners)
- Glen Auldyn (Private)
- Greeba Mountain (DEFA)
- Injebreck (Private)
- Lanagore and Eary Cushlin (DEFA and MNH)
- Maughold Mountain (DEFA)
- Michael Hills (DEFA)
- Mull (Meayll) Hill (Private)
- Mullagh Ouyr (Private)
- North Barrule (MUA)
- Peel Hill (Private and Peel Commissioners)
- Slieau Lhean (DEFA)
- Slieau Lhost and Slieau Ree (DEFA)
- Slieau Managh (DEFA)
- Slieau Whallian (Private)
- Snaefell (DEFA)
- South Barrule (DEFA)
- Surby (DEFA)
- Chasms and Spanish Head (MNH)
- The Rheast (DEFA)
- Windy Common (DEFA)

=== Nature Reserves and Wildlife Sites ===
Manx Wildlife Trust (MWT) was founded on 6th March 1973 and is the Isle of Man’s leading nature conservation charity.

As of May 2026, MWT manages 37 nature reserves, including the Calf of Man which is managed with and on behalf of Manx National Trust. These reserves total 1,103.00 ha (2,725.6 acres), or around 2% of the Isle of Man and include:

Name	Acquired	Area	Notes
Aust	2016	3.97 ha (9.8 acres)	
Ballachrink	2011	10.42 ha (25.7 acres)	Part of the Renscault & Ballachrink Bird Sanctuary
Ballachurry	2016	1.67 ha (4.1 acres)	
Ballamooar Meadow	1994	0.40 ha (0.99 acres)	
Ballanoa	2026	0.78 ha (1.9 acres)	
Barnell Reservoir	1974 & 1984	1.63 ha (4.0 acres)	Part of the Ballamoar Bird Sanctuary (Patrick)
Billown	2023	2.73 ha (6.7 acres)	Includes Rosehill Quarry ASSI
Breagle Glen & Cronk Aash	1988, 1991 & 2010	0.85 ha (2.1 acres)	
Calf of Man	N/A	262.34 ha (648.3 acres)	Owned by Manx National Trust, co-managed in partnership with Manx Wildlife Trust since 2006. Candidate Ramsar site and forms the "Calf of Man" Important Bird & Biodiversity Area
Close y Corvalley	2026	2.18 ha (5.4 acres)	
Close e Quayle	1994 & 2003	3.97 ha (9.8 acres)	
Close Sartfield	1987	12.34 ha (30.5 acres)	Part of the Ballaugh Curraghs ASSI and Ramsar Site
Close Umpson	1995, 2026	1.57 ha (3.9 acres)	Part of the Ballaugh Curraghs ASSI and Ramsar Site
Close y Vaillee	2026	1.44 ha (3.6 acres)	Part of the Ballaugh Curraghs ASSI and Ramsar Site
Cooildarry	1976 & 1979	7.77 ha (19.2 acres)	
Creg y Cowin	2023	44.32 ha (109.5 acres)	
Creggans	2025	19.02 ha (47.0 acres)	Part of the "Isle of Man Hills" Important Bird & Biodiversity Area
Cronk y Bing	1993	7.26 ha (17.9 acres)	An Area of Special Scientific Interest and a National Nature Reserve
Cronk y Chule	2026	46.18 ha (114.1 acres)	
Curragh Feeagh	1986	2.40 ha (5.9 acres)	
Curragh Kiondroghad (Onchan Wetlands)	1988 & 1990	0.54 ha (1.3 acres)	
Dalby Mountain	1995 & 2024	45.44 ha (112.3 acres)	Candidate Ramsar site, Part of the "Isle of Man Hills" Important Bird & Biodiversity Area
Dalby Mountain Fields	1995	4.27 ha (10.6 acres)	Part of the "Isle of Man Hills" Important Bird & Biodiversity Area
Dobbie's Meadow	2013	4.10 ha (10.1 acres)	
Earystane	1998	0.67 ha (1.7 acres)	
Fell's Field	1998	1.16 ha (2.9 acres)	
Glen Auldyn	2025	455.22 ha (1,124.9 acres)	Part of the "Isle of Man Hills" Important Bird & Biodiversity Area
Glen Dhoo	1995	10.04 ha (24.8 acres)	
Glion Darragh	2024	74.23 ha (183.4 acres)	
Goshen	1995, 1998, 2008 & 2023	18.93 ha (46.8 acres)	Part of Ballaugh Curraghs ASSI and Ramsar Site
Hairpin Woodland Park	2019, 2022, 2024 & 2025	32.89 ha (81.3 acres)	
Lough Cranstal	1989 & 2022	6.69 ha (16.5 acres)	Candidate Ramsar site
Lough Gat e Whing	2016	1.45 ha (3.6 acres)	
Miss Guyler's Meadow	1989	1.22 ha (3.0 acres)	
Moaney & Crawyn's Meadows	1995	0.96 ha (2.4 acres)	Part of the Ballaugh Curraghs ASSI and Ramsar Site
Mullen e Cloie	2008	1.15 ha (2.8 acres)	
The Keyllagh	2024	10.80 ha (26.7 acres)	
Total		1,103.00 ha (2,725.6 acres)	This represents approximately 2% of the Isle of Man's land area (57,198ha)

==== Designated Wildlife Sites ====
The Isle of Man has (as of March 2023) 92 non-statutory 'Wildlife Sites' covering 1,230.54 hectares (3,040.7 acres) in addition to the 10.4 km of coastline. As of 30 January 2009 this total was 45 wildlife sites, covering about 195 ha of land and an additional 10.5 km (6.5 mi) of inter-tidal coast. Wildlife Sites are not recognised in law, but are recognised in terms of Government policy, including planning and zonation (by the Isle of Man Strategic Plan) and agricultural policy (under Cross Compliance regulations). Wildlife Sites are shown on the MANNGIS Island Environment map.

==== Other Nature Reserves ====
- Ballalough Reedbeds: 1.4 ha (3.5 acres) managed by Castletown Commissioners
- Ballanette and Clay Head Brooghs: nature reserve, private but open to the public
- Snaefell Valley: nature reserve, private but open to the public
- Manx BirdLife Ayres National Reserve

=== Manx National Trust Landholdings ===
The following properties are under the protection of Manx National Heritage. The Manx National Trust owns properties in 15 of the 17 Manx parishes (all except Jurby and Michael).

- Andreas: Ballakeil, Kerroogarroo
- Arbory: Ballayack, building at the Friary
- Ballaugh: Ballaugh Curragh
- Braddan: Marine Drive, Braddan Pinfold
- Bride: The Ayres: Ballakesh, Ballawhannel
- Lezayre: Vollan Fort, The Grove, Killabrega, Sulby Glen
- Lonan: Ballacowle, Bulgham, Laxey Wheel, Gretch Veg, King Orry's Grave, Laxey Head, Cronk y Chule
- Malew: Silverdale Glen, Hango Hill, St Michael's Isle, Rushen Abbey, Castle Rushen
- Marown: Upper Ballaharry, The Braid
- Maughold: Maughold Head, Maughold Brooghs, Gob ny Rona, Maughold Green, Baldromma, Port Lewaigue, Ballaterson, Dhoon, Port e Vullen
- Onchan: Scollag Road
- Patrick: Eary Cushily, Ennin Moar, Creggan Mooar, Peel Castle, Niarbyl, Doarlish Mooar, Knockuskey
- Rushen: Cregneash, Chasms, Kitterland, Shenvalley, Meayll Hill, Sugarloaf, Calf of Man, Church Farm, Glen Chass, Rheast Mooar, Fistard, The Sound
- Santon: The Broogh Fort

== Geology ==
The majority of the island is formed from highly faulted and folded sedimentary rocks of the Ordovician period. There is a belt of younger Silurian rocks along the west coast between Niarbyl and Peel, and a small area of Devonian sandstones around Peel. A band of Carboniferous period rocks underlies part of the northern plain, but is nowhere seen at the surface; however similar age rocks do outcrop in the south between Castletown, Silverdale and Port St Mary. Permo- Triassic age rocks are known to lie beneath the Point of Ayre but, as with the rest of the northern plain, these rocks are concealed by substantial thicknesses of superficial deposits.

The island has significant deposits of copper, lead and silver, zinc, iron, and plumbago (a mix of graphite and clay). There are also quarries of black marble, limestone flags, clay schist, and granite. These are all modern, and there was no noticeable exploitation of metals or minerals before the modern era.

== Demographics ==
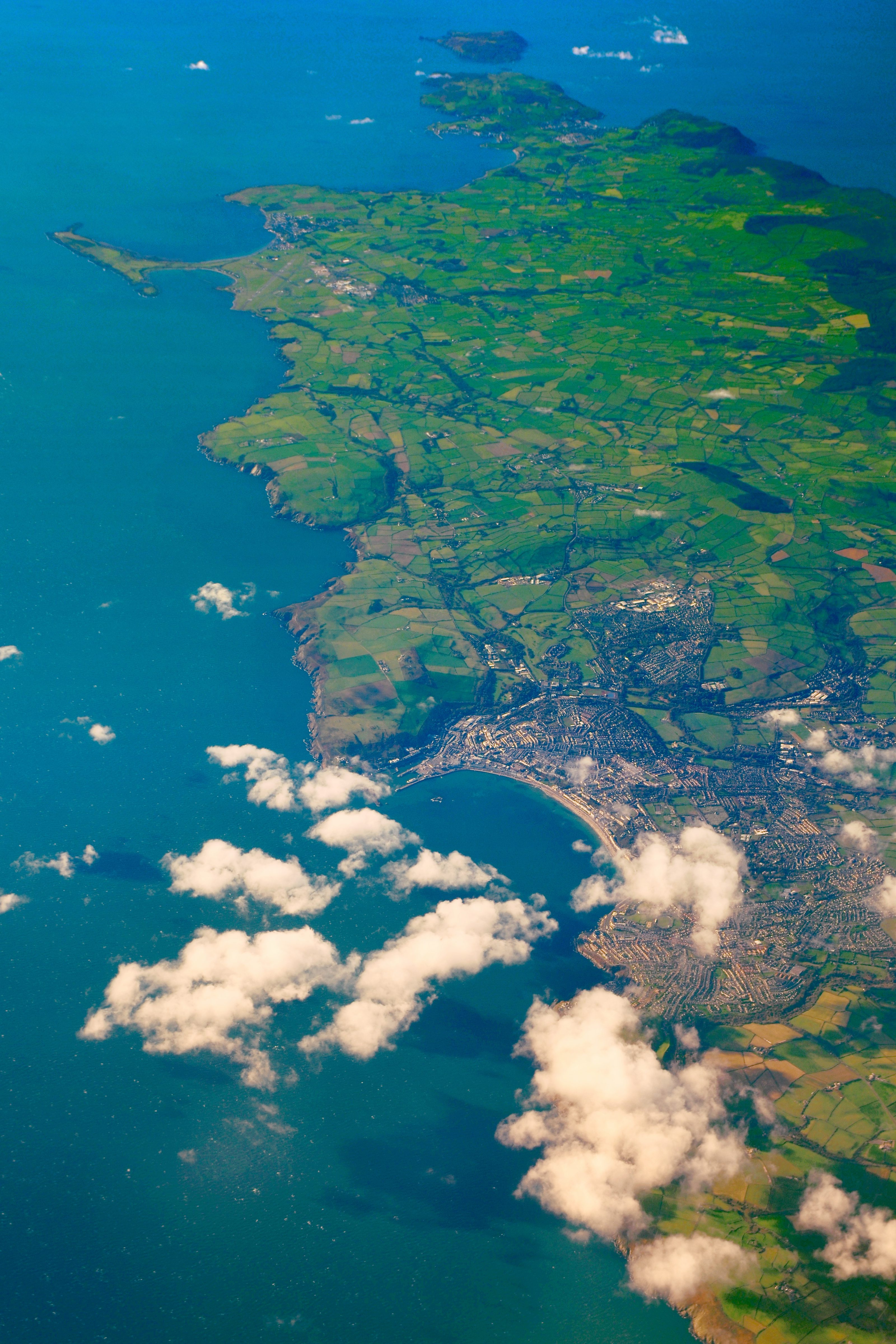
Aerial view of Douglas and the southern half of the Isle of Man

The island has a census-estimated population of 84,497 according to the most recent 2011 census: up from 79,805 in 2006 and 76,315 in 2001.

The island's largest town and administrative centre is Douglas, whose population is 23,000 – over a quarter of the population of the island. Neighbouring Onchan, Ramsey in the north, Peel in the west and the three southern ports of Castletown, Port Erin and Port St Mary are the island's other main settlements. Almost all its population lives on or very near the coast.

== See also ==
- Towns in the Isle of Man
- List of rivers of the Isle of Man
