= Sulby =

Sulby is a place name that may refer to:

- Sulby, Isle of Man
  - River Sulby, two rivers
  - Sulby Glen
  - Sulby Reservoir
- Sulby, Northamptonshire
  - Sulby Reservoir, Northamptonshire

== See also ==
- Soulby (disambiguation)
