= Lezayre =

Parish on the Isle of Man

Coordinates: 54.298°N 4.446°W

Lezayre: Manx: Creest ny h-Ayrey
- Parish of Lezayre, Isle of Man
- Population: 1,276
- OS grid reference: SC408919
- Sheading: Ayre
- Crown dependency: Isle of Man
- Post town: ISLE OF MAN
- Postcode district: IM7
- House of Keys: Ayre & Michael

Lezayre (/ləzˈɛər/ ləz-AIR; Manx: Creest ny h-Ayrey), formally Kirk Christ Lezayre, is one of the seventeen historic parishes of the Isle of Man.

It is located in the north of the island (part of the traditional North Side division) in the sheading of Ayre.

Administratively, part of the historic parish of Lezayre is now part of the town of Ramsey.

Other settlements in the parish include Glen Auldyn and Sulby.

== Local government ==
For the purposes of local government, most of the historic parish forms a single parish district with Commissioners.

Since 1865, an area in the east of the historic parish of Lezayre has been part of the separately administered town of Ramsey, with its own town commissioners.

The Captain of the Parish (since 2005) is Denis Duggan.

== Politics ==
Lezayre parish is part of the Ayre & Michael constituency, which elects two Members to the House of Keys. Before 2016 it was in the Ayre constituency, and since 1867 Ramsey has formed its own constituency.

== Geography ==
The parish is bounded by Michael and Ballaugh to the west, Andreas and Bride to the north, the town of Ramsey and the parishes of Lonan and Maughold to the east, and Braddan to the south. Its area is about 57 square kilometres (22 sq mi).

The name means "of", "at" or "towards" the Ayre.

Lezayre is primarily rural and mountainous, and includes the summit of Snaefell, the highest point of the island, and much of the mountain sections of the TT course. It also includes most of the course of the Sulby river, the longest river on the island; Tholt-y-Will Glen; and part of Sulby Reservoir. Most of the settlement in the parish is stretched along the main road from Ramsey towards Peel, including the village of Sulby and the small village of Churchtown centred on the parish church. Much of the northern part of the Millennium Way passes through the parish.

== Demographics ==
The Isle of Man census of 2016 returned a parish population of 1,276, a decrease of 0.5% from the figure of 1,282 in 2011.

Lezayre (census)
Year	1996	2001	2006	2011	2016	2021
Pop.	1,047	1,134	1,237	1,282	1,276	1,230
±%	—	+8.3%	+9.1%	+3.6%	−0.5%	−3.6%

== Churches ==
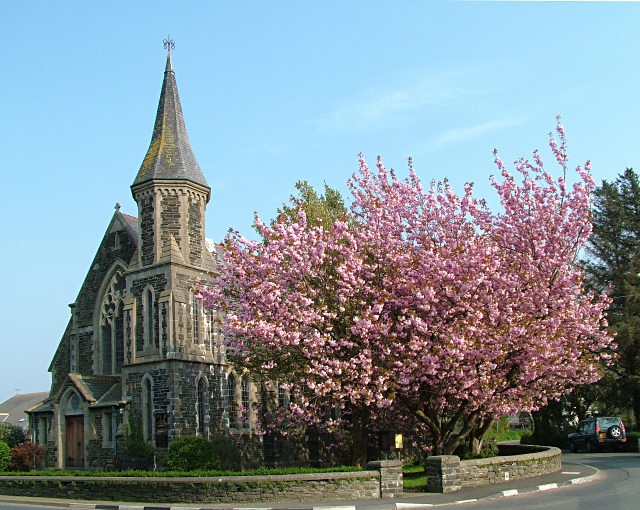
Sulby Methodist Church

The Church of England parish church of Kirk Christ, Lezayre was built in 1835. It is likely that it is so called to disambiguate it from the other Kirk Christ, located in the sheading of Rushen, and known as Kirk Christ Rushen. (Both churches are dedicated to the Holy Trinity.) It is the source of the name of the administrative parish. One of its windows was erected by stained glass painter and art dealer Daniel Cottier, whose father and grandfather were born in the parish. In 2013, it was closed and the diocese was looking to sell the building. There are two other Church of England churches in the parish: St. Stephen's, Sulby and St. Fingan's, a small converted Methodist chapel in Glen Auldyn.

Sulby has a prominent Methodist church.

== Sources ==
- Lezayre Parish community and local government information
- Manxnotebook - Lezayre with full description of the parish
- Isle of Man Building Control Districts showing parish boundaries
- Glenology - Manx Glens An ongoing study of Manx glens, their locations and meanings.
