= Glen Auldyn =

Valley and village on the Isle of Man

Coordinates: 54°18′12″N 4°25′17″W

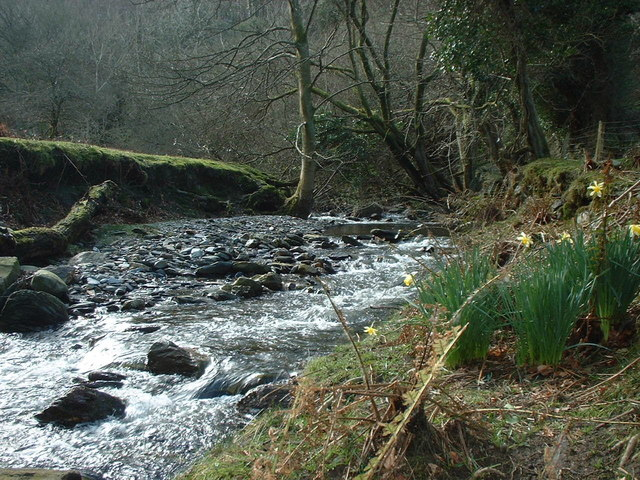
Spring, 2005

Glen Auldyn is a narrow valley about 6 kilometres (3.7 mi) long on the Isle of Man, with a river of the same name. This flows in a NNE direction and flows into the River Sulby not far from its estuary, near Ramsey. It is entirely within the parish of Lezayre. The lower one-third of the valley is inhabited and is partly followed by the B16 road. This section is overlooked by Sky Hill.

The middle section of the valley contains a ribbon of mature oak woodland.

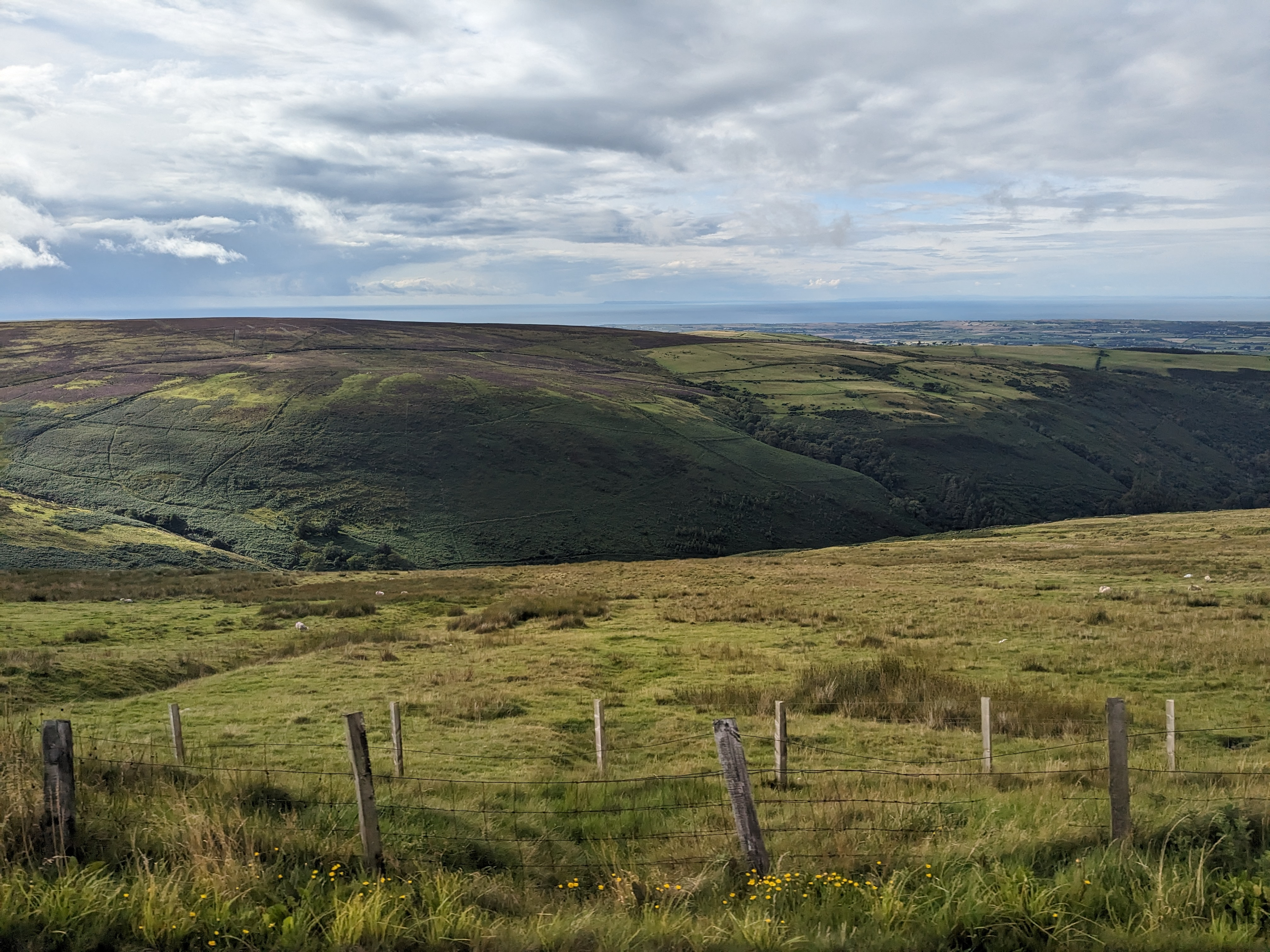
The glen from above

The valley contains the small church of St Fingan.

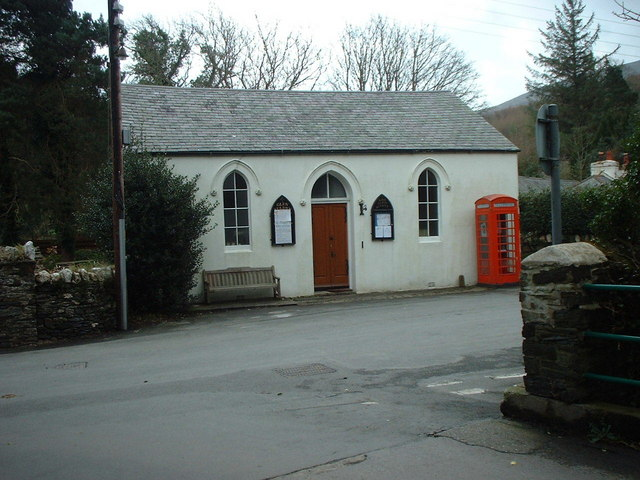
St Fingan Chapel, Glen Auldyn

In the valley is an underground reservoir with a capacity of around 6,800 cubic metres (240,000 cu ft) which supplies the north and east of the island.

In May 2025, Manx Wildlife Trust announced that they had purchased 455 hectares (1124 acres) of land in the upper parts of Glen Auldyn, including the moorland to the west, to create a new nature reserve where temperate rainforest will be restored. This forms Manx Wildlife Trust's 32nd and largest Manx nature reserve.
