= Ballaugh =

Village in the Isle of Man

Coordinates: 54.311°N 4.544°W

Ballaugh: Manx: Balley ny Loughey
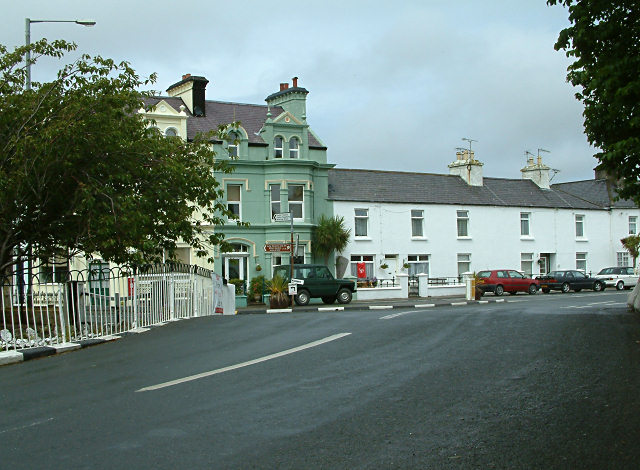
- Main road at Ballaugh Bridge

- Location within the Isle of Man
- Population: 1,032 (2016 Census)
- OS grid reference: SC345936
- Parish: Ballaugh
- Sheading: Michael
- Crown dependency: Isle of Man
- Post town: ISLE OF MAN
- Postcode district: IM7
- Dialling code: 01624
- Police: Isle of Man
- Fire: Isle of Man
- Ambulance: Isle of Man
- House of Keys: Ayre & Michael

Ballaugh (/bəˈlæf/ bə-LAF; from Manx Balley ny Loghey 'town of the lake', IPA: [b(alən)əˈlaf]) is a small village in the Isle of Man in the parish of the same name, in the sheading of Michael. It is the only village in the parish.

The parish adjoins Jurby to the north, Lezayre to the east, Michael to the south and south-west, and the Irish Sea to the west. It stretches about 5 miles or 8 km from north to south: at the extreme southern end it includes part of Sulby Reservoir, and to the west, it includes part of Bishopscourt, the former house of the Island's Bishop.

== History ==
The name 'Ballaugh' derives from the Manx Balley ny Loghey or "the place of the lake" cognate with loch and lough. The Ballaugh Curraghs is all that remains of this lake. The lake, which measured up to a mile in length, was drained by the excavation about 300 years ago of the silted-up Lhen Trench which, during the last ice age, is believed to have been a meltwater channel flowing north to south from the melting ice front.

In 1819 a nearly fully intact skeleton of an Irish Elk was discovered in bog land by Thomas Kewish and James Taubmann in Ballaugh. The Ballaugh Elk is currently housed at the National Museum of Scotland in Edinburgh.

An elaborate runic cross dated to the 10th century was discovered in Ballaugh in 1891. It can be viewed in Ballaugh Old Church.

Ballaugh was only connected to the water mains in the early 1950s; until then most residents used the local wells, including one situated in the rear yard of Ellan Vannin, a former coach house with stabling beside the yard.

In recent years the village has expanded, with new housing estates to the north of the village centre.

== Access and facilities ==
=== Road links ===
The village is situated on the main A3 Castletown to Ramsey road about seven miles west of Ramsey. The road crosses Ballaugh Bridge, a hump-backed bridge, in the village. It is accessible via the A10 road and A13 road when the TT Course is closed for racing.

=== Rail links ===
The village was served by Ballaugh Station which was part of the Manx Northern Railway that ran between St. John's and Ramsey. The station operated from 1879 until 1968. The station has since been demolished and the tracks lifted. A popular walking path now follows the route that the railway line once took.

=== Education ===
The village has one primary school, Ballaugh School, for children between the ages of 4 and 11. Currently the school has about 80 pupils. After year six pupils generally attend either Queen Elizabeth II High School in Peel or Ramsey Grammar School in Ramsey.

=== Entertainment ===
The Raven public house

There is one pub in Ballaugh – the "Raven" – and one convenience store, operated by Spar, which incorporates a post office.

A mile east of the village is the Curraghs Wildlife Park, situated in the Ballaugh Curraghs wetland, which is recognised by the Ramsar Convention. The park consists of several different animal exhibits and enclosures. After a mating pair of wallabies escaped the park in the 1960s, there are at least 160 living wild in the Manx countryside.

The village is situated on the Snaefell Mountain Course. During the annual TT and Manx Grand Prix races the village is a favourite spectator spot as Ballaugh Bridge, a hump-backed bridge is located at the village.

== Churches and chapels ==
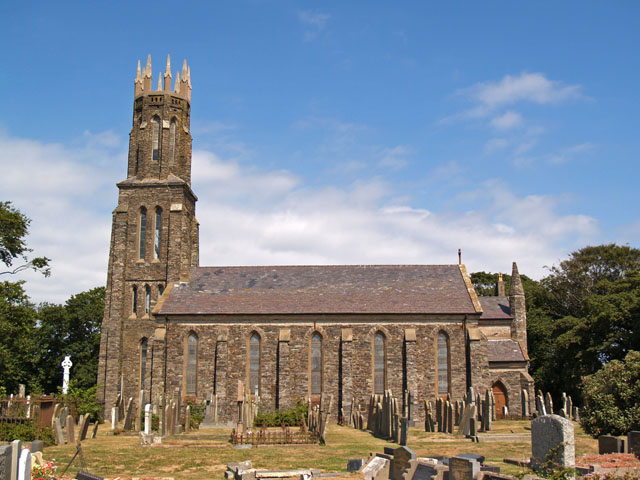
New parish church

The Church of England parish church is St Mary's Church located in the village, although there are two churches, the old and the new.

The old parish church of Ballaugh was located in what is now the hamlet of The Cronk, about 1.5 miles or 2.5 km north of the current village, on the treen (a subdivision of the parish) of Ballamona. In 1717, Thomas Wilson who was then the Bishop of Sodor and Man, added a simple baroque front and the church was lengthened by 21 feet (6 m) with a gable topped by a Bell-Cote added to the west end. Between 1757 and 1777, rear and side galleries were added.

On 24 March 1830 the parishioners of the old Ballaugh church held a vestry meeting to vote on whether to relocate and build a new larger church closer to the village. The Bishop of Sodor and Man presided at the meeting. It was decided by a vote of 110 to 84 to relocate the church. The foundation stone was laid for the new church on Ballatersson just one month later by Bishop Ward; the cost of building the church was £1,714.

With the building of the new church, the old church fell into disrepair. It was restored in 1849 with a new roof, although the galleries and chancel extension were removed. It was further restored in 1877 and 1955 and has since been used regularly for services. The new church was last renovated in 1893.

There have been a number of Methodist chapels in Ballaugh. Ballaugh (Ballaterson) Primitive Methodist Chapel closed in 1969 and since been demolished. The land on which the first Ballaugh Village Wesleyan Methodist Chapel stood was sold in 1778 to Thomas Clark for £2. He conveyed the property to a group of trustees on 19 December 1791. After the chapel was built, it was soon found to be too small, and in 1806 additional land was provided to expand the chapel. In 1868 a new village Wesleyan Methodist Chapel was built and the first chapel was then used as a Sunday school and hall. However, in 1999 the second chapel was closed and services reverted to the hall. Ballaugh New (Ballakinnag) Wesleyan Methodist Chapel was built in 1898. It is now a garage. (Ballaugh) Curragh Wesleyan Methodist Chapel was originally built in 1815 and closed in 1971.
