= Ramsey Town Hall, Isle of Man =

Municipal building in Ramsey, Isle of Man

Ramsey Town Hall and Library
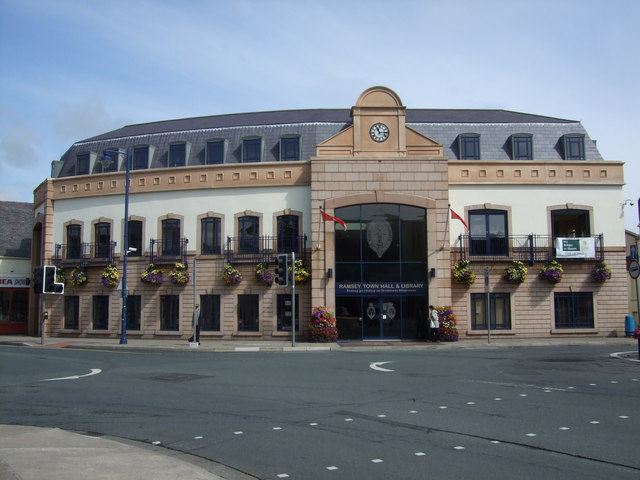
- The building in July 2009

- Shown in Isle of Man
- 54.3224°N 4.3865°W
- Location: Parliament Street, Ramsey

History
- Built: 2002

Site notes
- Architect: Cornerstone Architects
- Architectural style: Modern style

Ramsey Town Hall is a municipal building on Parliament Street, Ramsey, Isle of Man. It accommodates a public library as well as the offices and meeting place of the Ramsey Town Commissioners.

== History ==
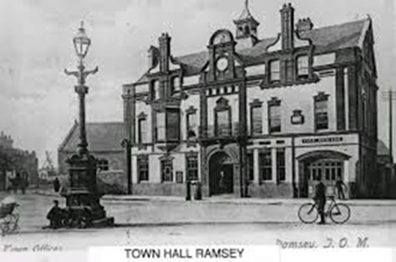
The first town hall

After significant population growth, largely associated with the seaside tourism industry, town commissioners were appointed in Ramsey in 1865. In the mid-1880s, the town commissioners decided to commission a town hall for the area and arranged a design competition. The site they selected was on the north side of Parliament Street. The new building was designed by a Mr Berrington in the Victorian style, built in brick with a cement render and was completed in August 1889.

The design involved an asymmetrical main frontage of seven bays facing onto Parliament Street. The central bay featured a round headed opening flanked by pilasters with imposts supporting a moulded surround with a keystone. On the first floor, there was a casement window with a balcony, flanked by pilasters supporting a cornice. Above the central bay, there was a clock flanked by pilasters supporting a round headed pediment. The second bay on the left featured a oriel window and the right-hand bay contained a segmental headed opening for the horse-drawn fire engine. At attic level, above the second and sixth bays, there were pairs of casement windows surmounted by chimneys which were flanked by Dutch gables. Internally, the principal room was the council chamber.

King George V, accompanied by Queen Mary, visited Ramsey and greeted the crowd from a platform in front of the town hall on 15 July 1920.

In the early 1970s, the town commissioners decided to demolish the first town hall and to erect a new town hall on the same site. The new building was designed in the modern style, built by Grimshaw Builders in concrete and glass and was officially opened in April 1974.

By the late 1990s, the second town hall was already dilapidated and the town commissioners decided to replace it. The current building, the third town hall, was designed by Cornerstone Architects in the modern style, built by contractors McCard in brick and stone, and was officially opened on 29 April 2002. The design involved an asymmetrical main frontage of ten bays facing onto Parliament Street. The third bay on the right featured a double-height glass entrance with a segmental head and a keystone. Above the central bay, there was a clock flanked by pilasters supporting a round headed pediment, recalling the features of the first town hall. The other bays were fenestrated by square headed casement windows on the ground floor, by segmental headed windows on the first floor and, above a parapet punctuated by small square shapes, by dormer windows at attic level. Internally, the principal spaces included the council chamber and the local public library. The civil registry, the benefits office, the local job club and the local coroner's office also subsequently established themselves in the building.
