= IUCN Species Survival Commission =

Special commission of IUCN

- Type: Commission
- Industry: Nature conservation
- Headquarters: Gland, Switzerland
- Area served: Worldwide
- Key people: Vivek Menon (chair)
- Products: IUCN Species Action Plans
- Services: Endangered species assessment, planning, implementation, networking and communication
- Parent: IUCN
- Website: website

The IUCN Species Survival Commission (IUCN SSC) is one of the six commissions of the International Union for Conservation of Nature (IUCN). The Species Survival Commission, the largest of the IUCN's six commissions, is a science-driven network consisting of 9,000 volunteer experts working in more than 160 Specialist Groups, including 17 invertebrate groups, Red List Authorities, and Task Forces. The IUCN Species Strategic Plan outlines conservation priorities, with the current plan covering the period from 2021 to 2025.

Vivek Menon is the chair of the commission.

== Specialist Groups ==
SSC Specialist Groups are primarily taxon-specific volunteer organizations made up mostly of research biologists and natural historians. Some groups focus on conservation issues specific to certain plants, animals, and fungi, while others work on broader goals like species reintroduction into former habitats, addressing climate change, wildlife health, and promoting sustainable use and trade.

National Species Specialist Groups are also another type of specialists groups promoted by the SSC to create national species expert networks aimed at reversing biodiversity loss and addressing emerging sustainability challenges related to nature.

== Species Actions Plans ==
Since 1986 the SSC has been publishing Species Action Plans. Action Plans are developed by SSC Specialist Groups. The plans evaluate the conservation status of species and their habitats, and establish conservation priorities.

== See also ==
- IUCN Red List
- World Commission on Protected Areas (WCPA)
- Important Shark and Ray Areas (ISRA)
- Endangered species recovery plan
