= Sulby Reservoir =

Reservoir on the Isle of Man, Britain

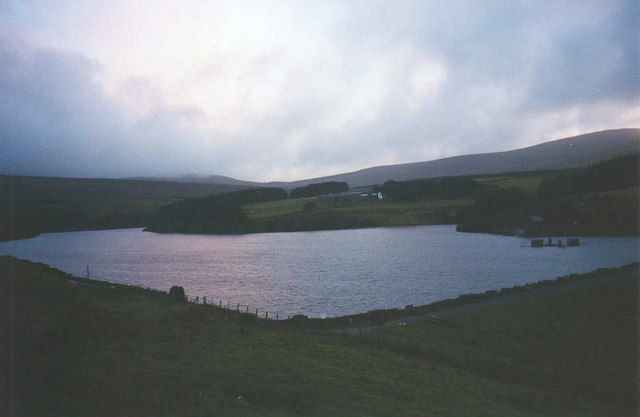
- Dusk at Sulby Reservoir, 2009

- Location within Isle of Man Location within the United Kingdom
- Interactive map of Sulby Reservoir
- Location: Sulby Glen
- Coordinates: 54°16′17″N 4°30′00″W
- Type: Reservoir
- Primary inflows: Sulby River
- Primary outflows: Sulby River
- Catchment area: 16.2 square kilometres (4,000 acres)
- Basin countries: Isle of Man
- Surface area: 62.3 hectares (154 acres)
- Average depth: 25 m (82 ft)
- Water volume: 4.832×10^{6} m^{3} (3,917 acre⋅ft)

The Sulby Reservoir is the largest reservoir or lake in the Isle of Man, with an area of 154 acres (62 ha).

== The reservoir ==
Sulby is an impounding reservoir. The dam was completed in 1982 and has a rock-fill embankment 73 metres (240 ft) high. The reservoir's capacity is 4,832,000 m^{3} (170,640,470 ft^{3}) and the maximum depth 73 m (240 ft). The water flows to Sulby Water Treatment Works, from where it is pumped to consumers.

== Geography ==
The reservoir is located at the top of Sulby Glen near the source of the Sulby River, the longest river on the island. It is at the foot of Druidale; Glen Crammag; the valley of the upper part of the Sulby River; and a fourth, unnamed minor valley, receiving water from all these rivers. It is at the junction of three parishes: Michael, Lezayre and Braddan. Sulby Reservoir is also about 1.5 miles (2.4 km) west of the summit of Snaefell, the island's highest peak. It is operated by the Isle of Man Water Authority.

== Use ==
The reservoir supplies the northern half of the island, St Johns, Peel, Kirk Michael, Ballaugh, Andreas, Bride, Ramsey and Laxey. Water can also be pumped to the West Baldwin Reservoir which supplies Douglas and the southern half of the island.

The reservoir also powers a hydro-electric power station one mile (1.6 kilometres) downstream. Water flows through a pipeline from the reservoir to the power station. The power station is also fed by another, smaller reservoir, Block Eary. An energy recovery system was installed at the Sulby Water Treatment Works in 2013, to generate hydro-electric power from the incoming water, which is then purified before being pumped on to customers.

Trout fishing is available and there is a large car park. It is also a registered dark sky discovery site.
