= Soulby (disambiguation) =

Soulby is a village and civil parish near Kirkby Stephen, in the county of Cumbria, England

Soulby may also refer to:

- Soulby, Dacre a hamlet in the civil parish of Dacre in the county of Cumbria, England
- William Soulby, a 14th Century English Member of Parliament who has been murdered

== See also ==
- Sulby (disambiguation)
- Soulby Fell, a hill in the Lake District, England
- Soulbury, Aylesbury Vale, Buckinghamshire, England
