= Paul Lebiedzinski =

Manx poet

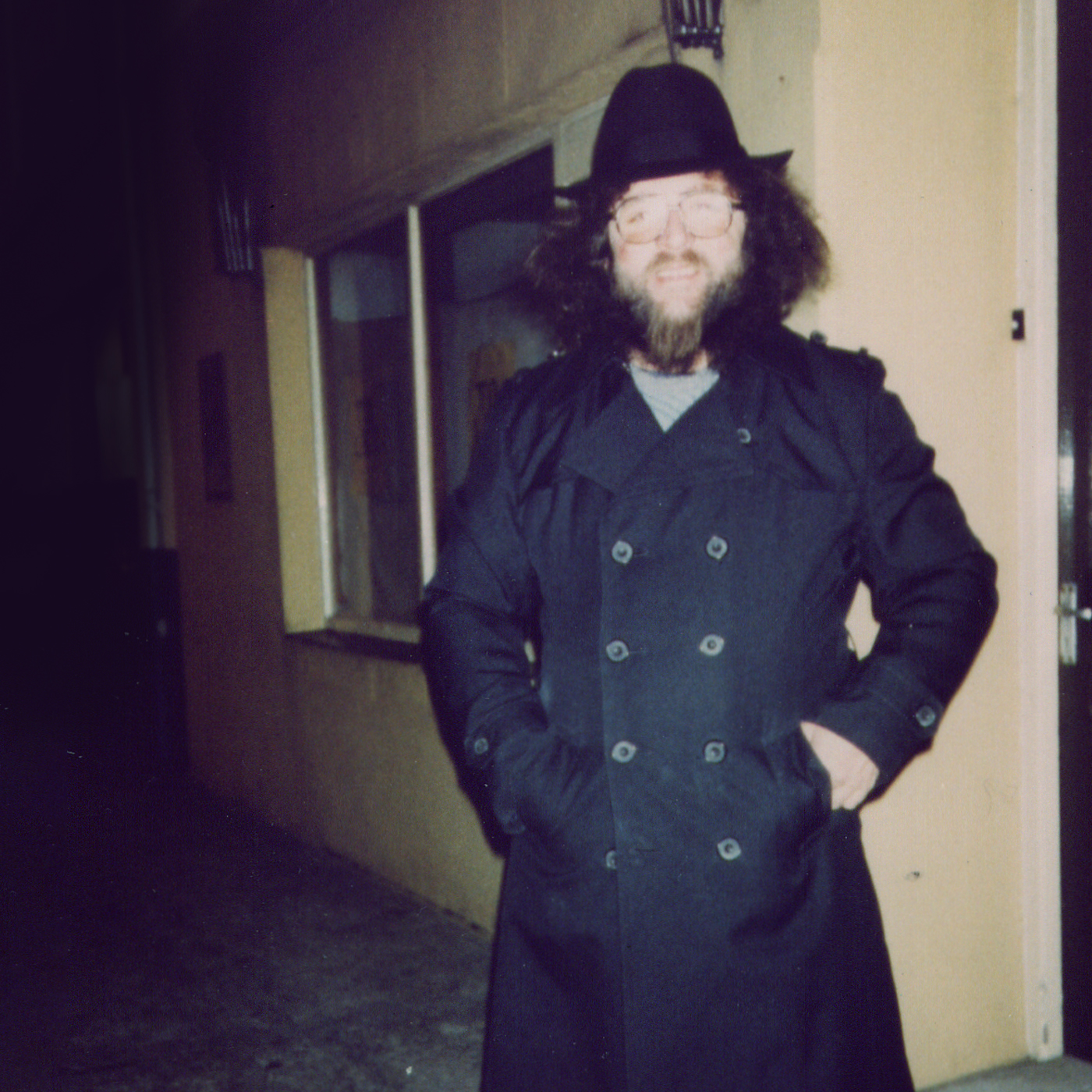
- Paul Lebiedzinski in 1991, photographed by Enid Church (née Broderick)
- Born: Paul Alexsander Lebiedzinski; 17 August 1951; Ramsey, Isle of Man
- Died: 30 April 1995 (aged 43); Nobles Hospital, Isle of Man
- Occupations: Gardener and poet
- Writing career
- Genres: Poetry, songs

Paul Lebiedzinski (17 August 1951 – 30 April 1995) was a Manx poet best known for his politically-charged poetry of the 1970s and 80s. He has been described as 'one of the finest poets the Island has produced in modern times.'

== Childhood ==
Lebiedzinski's father, Aleksander Lebiedzinski, came to the Isle of Man during World War II as a Flight Lieutenant in the Polish Air Force. He married Kathleen (née Dempsey) in February 1947, and they set up business as hairdressers at 14 Lezayre Road, Ramsey, where they were living at the time of Paul Lebiedzinski's birth on 17 August 1951.

Lebiedzinski's parents divorced when he was four, at which point he moved with his mother to Forest View on Bowring Road, north Ramsey. Due to the demands of running her own hairdressing business, Lebiedzinski's mother sent Paul to live with his grandmother at 44 Church Street, south Ramsey. From here he attended St. Maughold's Catholic School until the age of eleven, when he transferred to Ramsey Grammar School. He did not enjoy school and left at the earliest possible point at the age of fifteen.

== Professional life ==
Lebiedzinski tried numerous jobs, including: hairdresser, builder's labourer, upholsterer, shop proprietor, farm labourer, die-caster, pottery worker, laundry worker and supermarket assistant. In 1977 he became a self-employed gardener, an occupation which ‘suited him more than any other.’ He also took up traditional Manx thatching, which he learnt in 1972 from master thatcher, Thomas Brew of Sulby, who was also responsible for encouraging Lebiedzinski to take up the melodeon.

Lebiedzinski also took up politics, serving on the Ramsey Town Commissioners during 1976–9 and 1988–90. Although his initiation into local politics came about through an uncontested seat becoming available, friends still saw this move as 'very surprising,' as he was generally viewed as 'a natural challenge to many people in authority.'

== Poetry ==
Lebiedzinski first began writing poetry at the age of twelve, and published his first poem as a teenager in the 1960s in the Isle of Man Examiner. By the 1970s he had become a prolific poet, publishing regularly in the Manx papers and becoming very popular for his performances of his own poetry at folk evenings.

Lebiedzinski's poetry has been characterised as frequently satirical and full of invective, reflecting his anger and sadness at the loss of the old Manx way of life. These elements appear frequently in his work and it is well represented in the opening lines of 'Colonel Pimp', a poem about a fictional property developer who moves to the Isle of Man:

I’ll give you a farmhouse a day, dear,
I’ll give you a farmhouse a day;
I’ll grab all until I own every green hill
And the Manxmen are driven away.

Other of his poems display a more tender, nostalgic or emotional side. Poems such as 'Hung Goodbyes' are a good example of this:

Don’t worry; when the time comes for farewells
I shall not cup your face within my hands
And kiss you until the stars fade in a glowing dawn
Nor will I ask a fond embrace from you
To appease the solitary hours
Upon this earth when you are gone.

Lebiedzinski was the subject of a film, Yn Gareyder ('The Gardener' in Manx), made by George Broderick and Peter Maggs and produced by Foillan Films in 1986. It was also with George Broderick, Brian Stowell and Freddie Cowle that he formed a loosely-knit group, Yn Ravvalyn ('The Rebels').

== Later years ==
In the 1990s Lebiedzinski began to struggle with alcoholism, entering a period friends described as 'a very dark one for him.' He died on 30 April 1995 at the age of 43.

== Legacy ==
Lebiedzinski's place as an important figure in Manx literature came to be asserted by friends and organisations after his death. Yn Chruinnaght organised a lecture on Lebiedzinski's life and work in 1995, wherein George Broderick spoke of him as 'one of the finest poets the Island has produced in modern times.' A Paul Lebiedzinski prize for Manx Affairs was created at his former school, Ramsey Grammar, in 1995, where it is awarded annually to the pupil who has made the most significant contribution on the subject of Manx politics. In 1998 Culture Vannin released a cassette tape of recordings of Lebiedzinski performing at various events between the 1970s and 1990s. This set of recordings, titled Six Foot Under, was re-released in digital form in August 2018. In 2020 the first ever book of Paul's poetry, Until the Manxmen are driven away: The selected poems of Paul Lebiedzinski, was published by Culture Vannin, which brought together poems from his recorded archive and the previously private manuscripts held by the poet's family.
