= Manx Wildlife Trust =

Nature conservation charity in the Isle of Man

Manx Wildlife Trust (MWT) was founded on 6th March 1973 and is the Isle of Man’s leading nature conservation charity.

As of May 2026, MWT manages 37 nature reserves, including the Calf of Man which is managed with and on behalf of Manx National Trust. These reserves total 1,102.96 ha (2,725.5 acres), or around 2% of the Isle of Man and include:

Name	Acquired	Area	Notes
Aust	2016	3.97 ha (9.8 acres)	
Ballachrink	2011	10.42 ha (25.7 acres)	Part of the Renscault & Ballachrink Bird Sanctuary
Ballachurry	2016	1.67 ha (4.1 acres)	
Ballamooar Meadow	1994	0.40 ha (0.99 acres)	
Ballanoa	2026	0.78 ha (1.9 acres)	
Barnell Reservoir	1974 & 1984	1.63 ha (4.0 acres)	Part of the Ballamoar Bird Sanctuary (Patrick)
Billown	2023	2.73 ha (6.7 acres)	Includes Rosehill Quarry ASSI
Breagle Glen & Cronk Aash	1988, 1991 & 2010	0.85 ha (2.1 acres)	
Calf of Man	N/A	262.34 ha (648.3 acres)	Owned by Manx National Trust, co-managed in partnership with Manx Wildlife Trust since 2006. Candidate Ramsar site and forms the "Calf of Man" Important Bird & Biodiversity Area
Close y Corvalley	2026	2.18 ha (5.4 acres)	
Close e Quayle	1994 & 2003	3.97 ha (9.8 acres)	
Close Sartfield	1987	12.34 ha (30.5 acres)	Part of the Ballaugh Curraghs ASSI and Ramsar Site
Close Umpson	1995, 2026	1.57 ha (3.9 acres)	Part of the Ballaugh Curraghs ASSI and Ramsar Site
Close y Vaillee	2026	1.44 ha (3.6 acres)	Part of the Ballaugh Curraghs ASSI and Ramsar Site
Cooildarry	1976 & 1979	7.77 ha (19.2 acres)	
Creg y Cowin	2023	44.32 ha (109.5 acres)	
Creggans	2025	19.02 ha (47.0 acres)	Part of the "Isle of Man Hills" Important Bird & Biodiversity Area
Cronk y Bing	1993	7.26 ha (17.9 acres)	An Area of Special Scientific Interest and from July 2026 a National Nature Reserve
Cronk y Chule	2026	46.18 ha (114.1 acres)	
Curragh Feeagh	1986	2.40 ha (5.9 acres)	
Curragh Kiondroghad (Onchan Wetlands)	1988 & 1990	0.54 ha (1.3 acres)	
Dalby Mountain	1995 & 2024	45.44 ha (112.3 acres)	Candidate Ramsar site, Part of the "Isle of Man Hills" Important Bird & Biodiversity Area
Dalby Mountain Fields	1995	4.27 ha (10.6 acres)	Part of the "Isle of Man Hills" Important Bird & Biodiversity Area
Dobbie's Meadow	2013	4.10 ha (10.1 acres)	
Earystane	1998	0.67 ha (1.7 acres)	
Fell's Field	1998	1.16 ha (2.9 acres)	
Glen Auldyn	2025	455.22 ha (1,124.9 acres)	Part of the "Isle of Man Hills" Important Bird & Biodiversity Area
Glen Dhoo	1995	10.04 ha (24.8 acres)	
Glion Darragh	2024	74.23 ha (183.4 acres)	
Goshen	1995, 1998, 2008 & 2023	18.93 ha (46.8 acres)	Part of Ballaugh Curraghs ASSI and Ramsar Site
Hairpin Woodland Park	2019, 2022, 2024 & 2025	32.89 ha (81.3 acres)	
Lough Cranstal	1989 & 2022	6.69 ha (16.5 acres)	Candidate Ramsar site
Lough Gat e Whing	2016	1.45 ha (3.6 acres)	
Miss Guyler's Meadow	1989	1.22 ha (3.0 acres)	
Moaney & Crawyn's Meadows	1995	0.96 ha (2.4 acres)	Part of the Ballaugh Curraghs ASSI and Ramsar Site
Mullen e Cloie	2008	1.15 ha (2.8 acres)	
The Keyllagh	2024	10.80 ha (26.7 acres)	
Total		1,103.00 ha (2,725.6 acres)	This represents approximately 2% of the Isle of Man's land area (57,198ha)

== Nature Discovery Centres ==
Manx Wildlife Trust also operates seasonal "Nature Discovery Centres" at both the Ayres National Nature Reserve and Scarlett (Malew), along with one co-located with their Gift Shop beneath the Manx Wildlife Trust offices in Peel.
