= Sulby Glen =

Partly wooded glen in the Isle of Man

Coordinates: 54.2951°N 4.4877°W

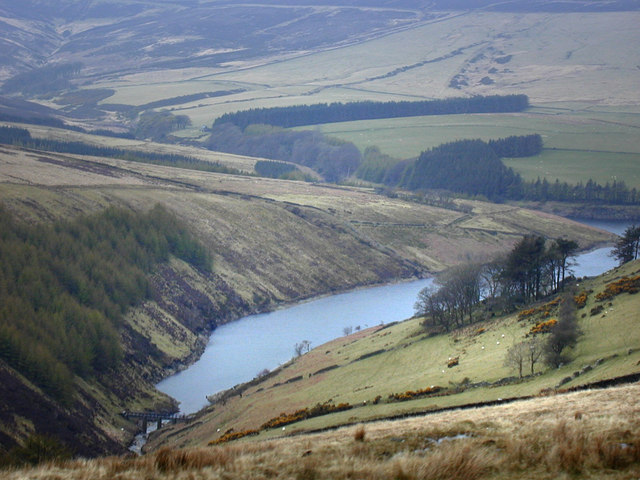

Sulby Glen is a partly wooded glen in the parish of Lezayre in the Isle of Man. It runs north to south and is about 5 km (3 miles) long. In places the floor of the glen is only 50 metres wide, with steep sides.

The Sulby River rises in the nearby Snaefell Mountain foothills and flows through the glen, and it also contains the A14 road. At the top of the glen the river emerges from the Sulby Reservoir (the largest reservoir in the island, created in 1982). At the bottom of the glen, about 1 km south of the village of Sulby, the river emerges into the island's northern plain. By the riverside just below this point is Sulby Claddagh, a local beauty spot and camp site.

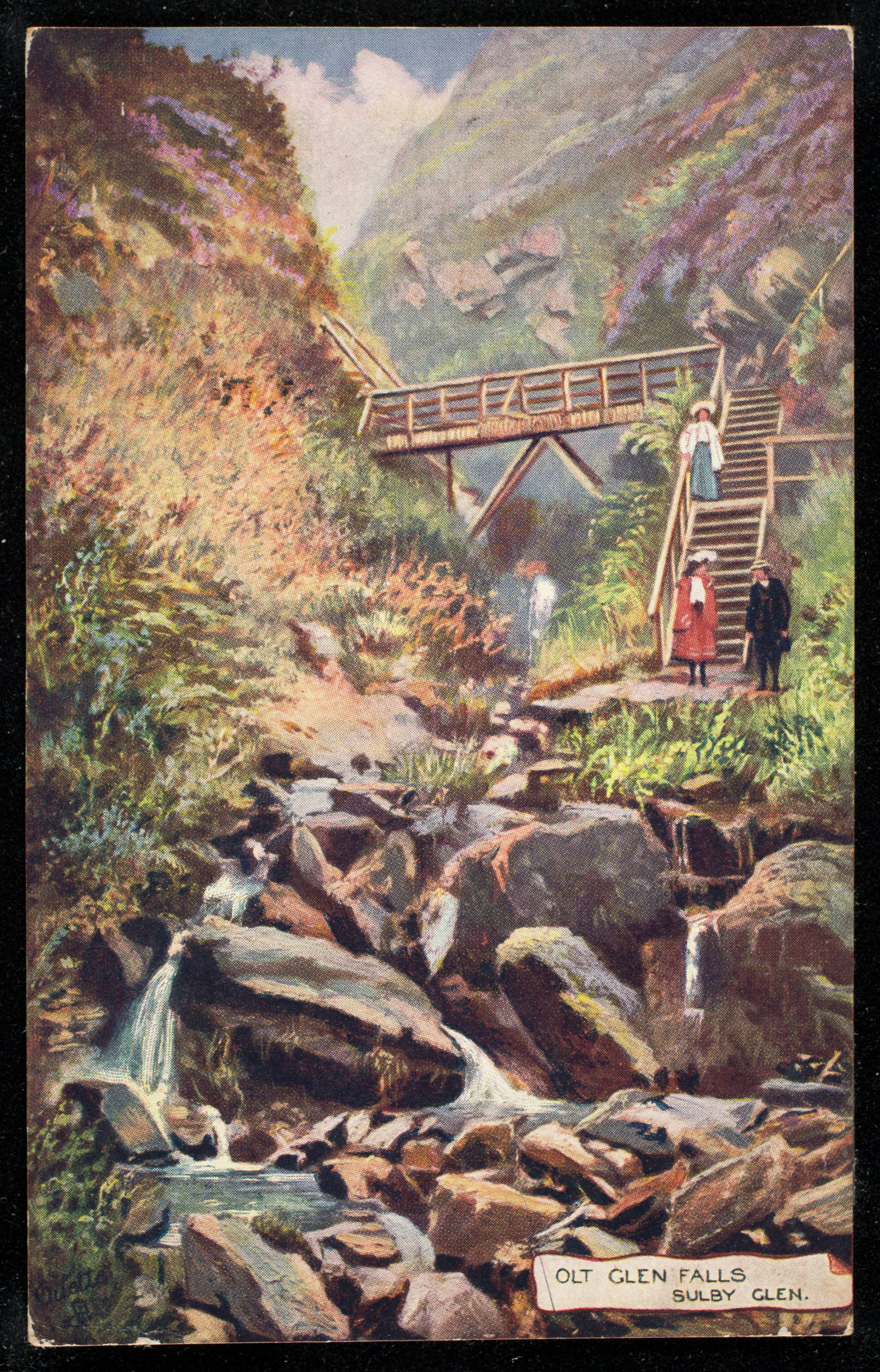
Olt Falls, within Tholt-y-Will Glen, in early 1900s postcard image

A small side valley branching from Sulby Glen near Sulby Reservoir is occupied by Tholt-y-Will Glen, one of the officially-listed Manx National Glens and the only one of these which is located in the mountainous centre of the island. This is managed, preserved and maintained in a semi-natural state by a government agency: the Forestry Amenity and Lands Directorate of the Department of Environment, Food and Agriculture. As at October 2017, access to Tholt-y-Will Glen was restricted due to a damaged bridge. At the entrance to Tholt-y-Will Glen is a small car park and picnic area.
