= Important Shark and Ray Area =

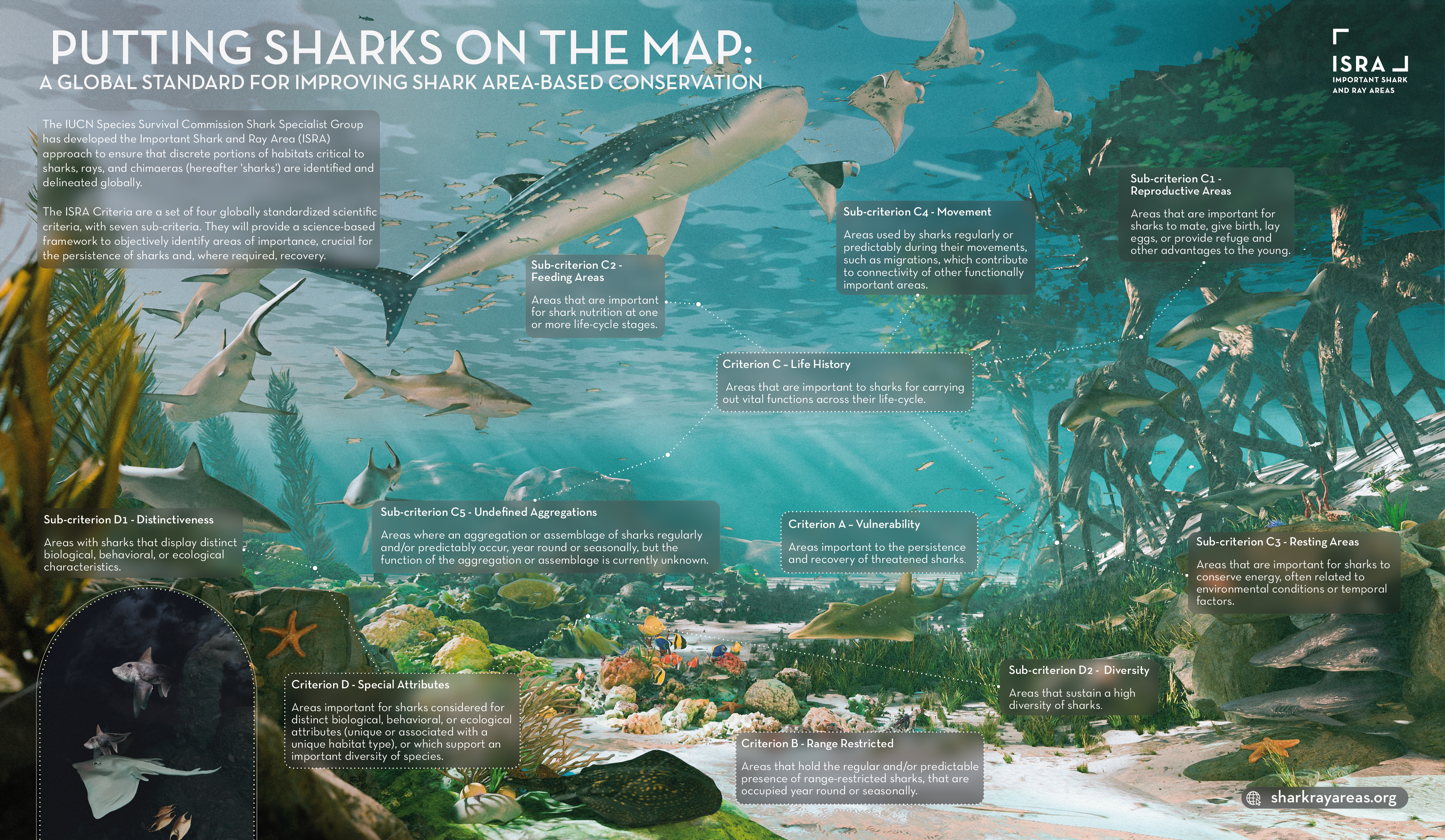
The ISRA criteria take into account the complex biological and ecological needs of sharks. There are four criteria and seven sub-criteria.

Important Shark and Ray Areas (ISRA) are discrete three-dimensional portions of habitat that are important for one or more species of chondrichthyans (sharks, rays and chimaeras) and have the potential to be managed for conservation. This project is led by the Shark Specialist Group of the International Union for Conservation of Nature (IUCN) Species Survival Commission.

The identification of ISRA is a purely biocentric, fact-based process founded on the application of scientific criteria supported by the best available scientific evidence. This makes the ISRA identification process completely independent of political pressures. The main objective of ISRA is to attract the attention of politicians and decision-makers to the need to maintain a favourable conservation status of sharks in those specific areas, through the implementation of appropriate management measures, which could include the designation of a marine protected area or other area-based management measures. The project is funded by the Shark Conservation Fund, among others.

There are four criteria for a marine habitat to be considered an ISRA, which are related to its vulnerability, its three-dimensional geographic distribution, its life history, and special attributes of the species. Once the ISRA zones are approved and declared, they are incorporated into an electronic map on the project page.

== ISRA by region ==
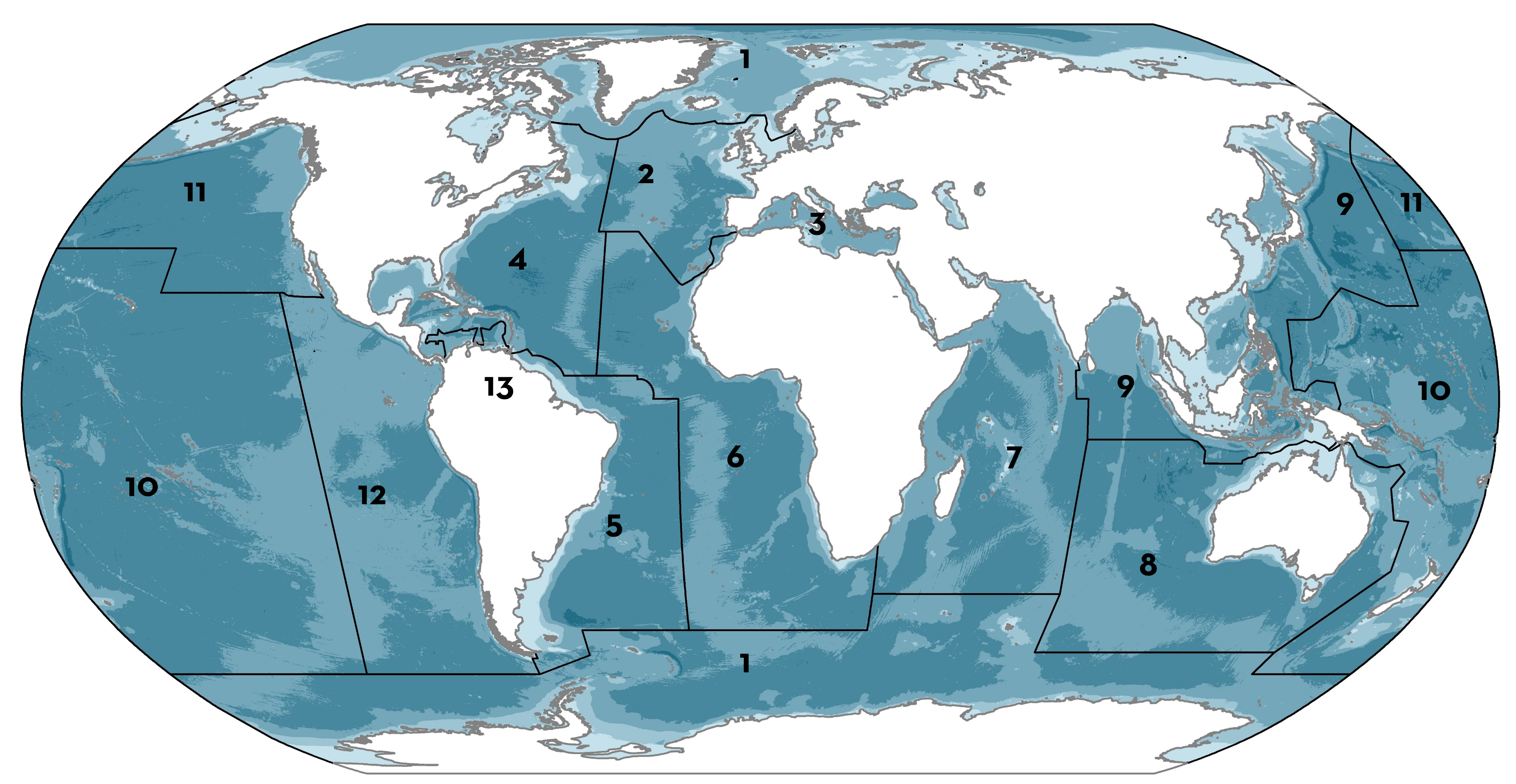
ISRAs are identified through an expert-led process planned over a series of 13 regional workshops.

As of May 2024, 694 ISRAs, 19 Candidate ISRAs and 132 Areas of Interest have been identified. Candidate ISRAs and Areas of Interest are areas where more information is needed but have the potential to become ISRAs.

ISRAs are identified through an expert-led process planned over a series of 13 regional workshops covering global waters. The thirteen regions are:

1. Polar waters
2. European Atlantic
3. Mediterranean and Black Sea
4. North America and Caribbean Atlantic
5. South American Atlantic
6. African Atlantic
7. Western Indian Ocean
8. Australian and South-Eastern Indian Ocean
9. Asia
10. New Zealand and Pacific Islands
11. North American Pacific
12. Central and South American Pacific
13. South American Inland Waters.

At the first regional workshop, October 2022, the ISRA project team and local specialists identified 65 ISRAs in the Pacific region of Central and South America (from the Gulf of California in Mexico to southern Chile, including the oceanic islands of Revillagigedo, Easter Island, among others).

At the second regional workshop, May 2023, 65 ISRAs were identified for the Mediterranean and Black Sea region.

At the third regional workshop, September 2023, 125 ISRAs have been identified for the Western Indian Ocean region.

At the fourth regional workshop, January 2024, 122 ISRAs were identified for the Asia region.

At the fifth regional workshop, May 2024, 34 ISRAs were identified for the Polar Waters region.

At the sixth regional workshop, August 2024, 179 ISRAs were identified for the New Zealand and Pacific Islands region.

At the seventh regional workshop, January 2025, 21 ISRAs were identified for the South American Inland Waters region, and 81 ISRAs for the South American Atlantic region.

== ISRA criteria ==
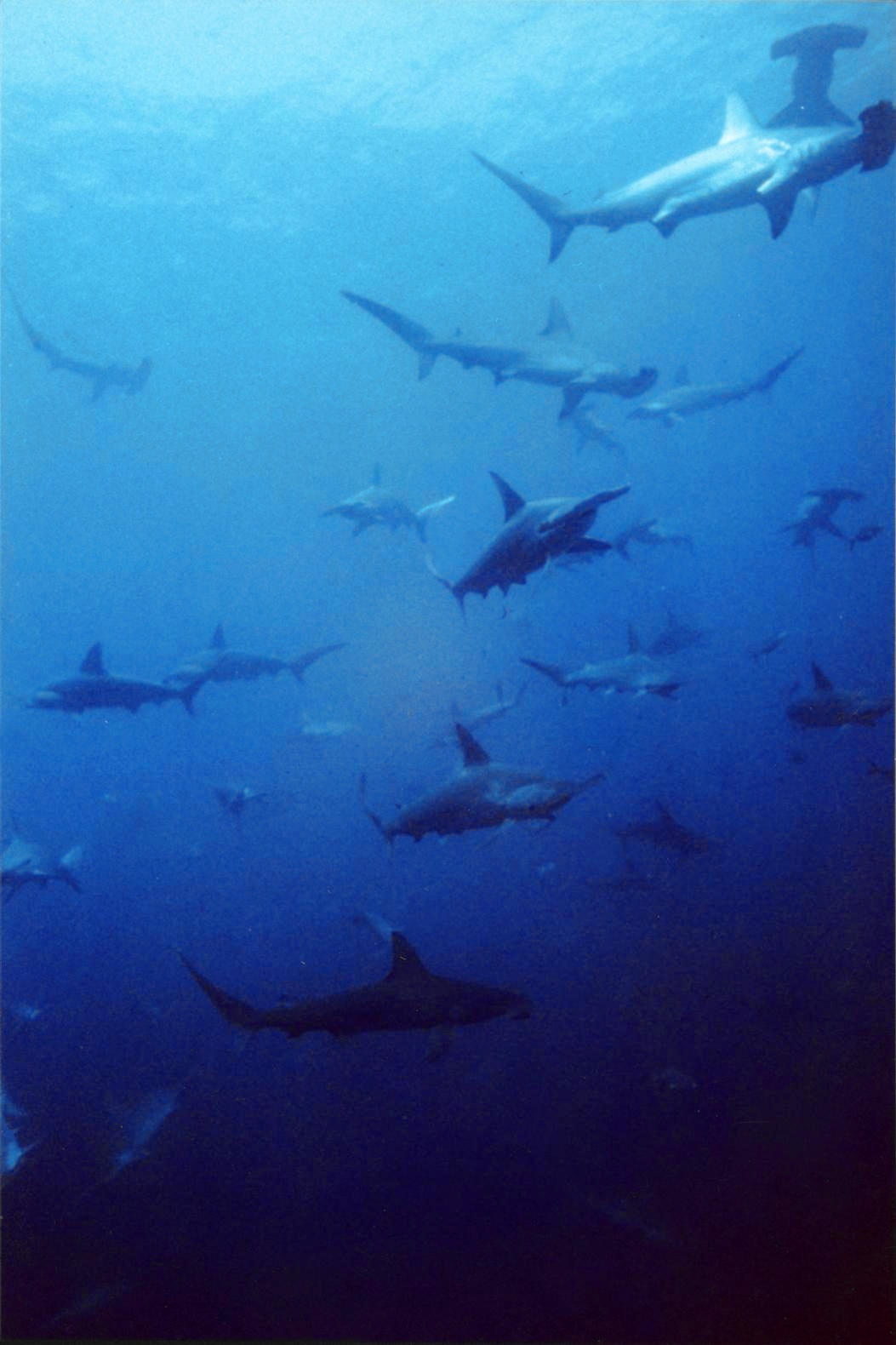
Hammerhead shark aggregation in the Galapagos Islands

The identification of ISRAs is achieved through the application of scientifically-based criteria. The definition of these ISRA criteria is of vital importance for the effectiveness of the tool in terms of its application, standardization and consistency across all identified areas, as well as to ensure comparability between ISRAs at national, regional, and international scales. The criteria are designed to cover important aspects of shark biology (e.g., age, growth and reproduction), ecology and population structure, and include multiple aspects of species vulnerability, distribution and movement patterns, abundances, specific habitat requirements and key life-cycle activities, as well as areas of high diversity and endemism.

Criterion A - Vulnerability are important areas for the persistence and recovery of sharks, rays, and/or chimaeras that are endangered according to the IUCN Red List of Threatened Species or national listings.

Criterion B - Restricted Distribution are areas that contain the regular and/or predictable presence of sharks, rays and/or chimaeras with a restricted distribution and that are occupied permanently or seasonally.

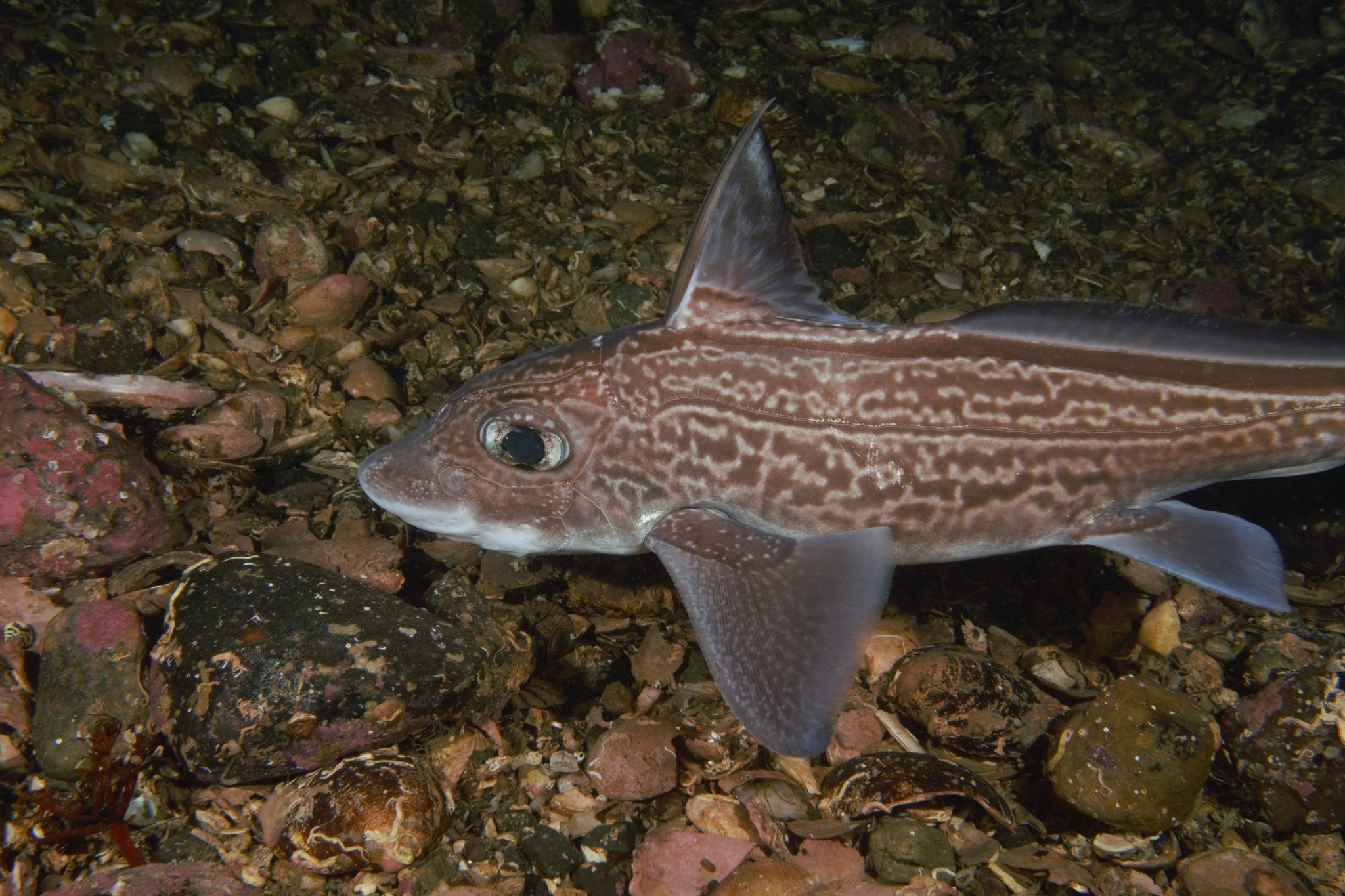

Criterion C - Life History are important areas for sharks, rays and/or chimaeras where they carry out key functions throughout their life cycle (including reproduction, feeding, resting, movement or indefinite aggregations). Sub-criterion C1 - Reproductive Areas are important areas for mating, giving birth, laying eggs or that provide shelter and other benefits to newborn or under-yearling sharks. Subcriterion C2 - Feeding Areas are areas important for shark nutrition during one or more life cycle stages. Subcriterion C3 - Resting Areas are areas important for energy conservation in sharks and are often related to environmental conditions or temporal factors. Subcriterion C4 - Movement are areas regularly or predictably used by sharks during movements, such as migrations, which contribute to the connectivity of important areas. Subcriterion C5 - Indefinite Aggregations are areas where regular and/or predictable aggregations or groupings of sharks occur, year-round or seasonally, but their function is currently unknown.

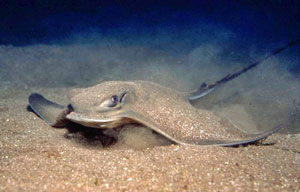
Eagle ray feeding.

Criterion D - Special Attributes are areas important for sharks that are considered distinctive for biological, behavioral, or ecological attributes (unique or associated with a unique habitat type), or that support significant species diversity. Subcriterion D1 - Distinctive are areas where sharks display distinctive biological, behavioral, or ecological characteristics. Subcriterion D2 - Diversity are areas that contain significant shark diversity.

== Importance of ISRA ==
Chondrichthyans (sharks, rays, and chimaeras) face a global extinction crisis. According to the IUCN Red List of Threatened Species, over one third of chondrichthyans are currently estimated to be threatened with extinction. Over the past century, fishing has had a significant and cumulative impact on chondrichthyans and this threat has been exacerbated by habitat loss and climate change. Threat levels are highest in coastal areas where 75% of threatened species are found. This makes sharks one of the most threatened taxa in the marine environment, second only to amphibians globally.

== See also ==
- List of threatened rays
- List of threatened sharks
