= River Sulby =

River on the Isle of Man

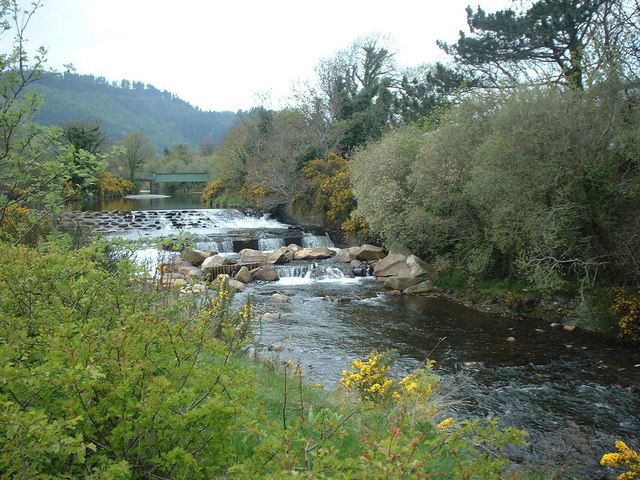

River Sulby or Sulby River can refer to one of two rivers on the Isle of Man:

- The longest river on the island, rising on Snaefell near the Sulby Reservoir and running north through Sulby Glen and then east, for 11 miles (18 km), before reaching the coast at Ramsey (54°19′25″N 4°22′45″W). It is crossed in Ramsey by the Victorian Ramsey swing bridge, built in 1892.
- A tributary which rises to the west of Creg-ny-Baa, and flows south-west for about 4 km before joining the River Glass. 54.18539°N 4.50061°W

== See also ==
- List of rivers in the Isle of Man
