= Ramsey, Isle of Man =

Town on the Isle of Man

Coordinates: 54.321111°N 4.384444°W

Ramsey: Manx: Rhumsaa
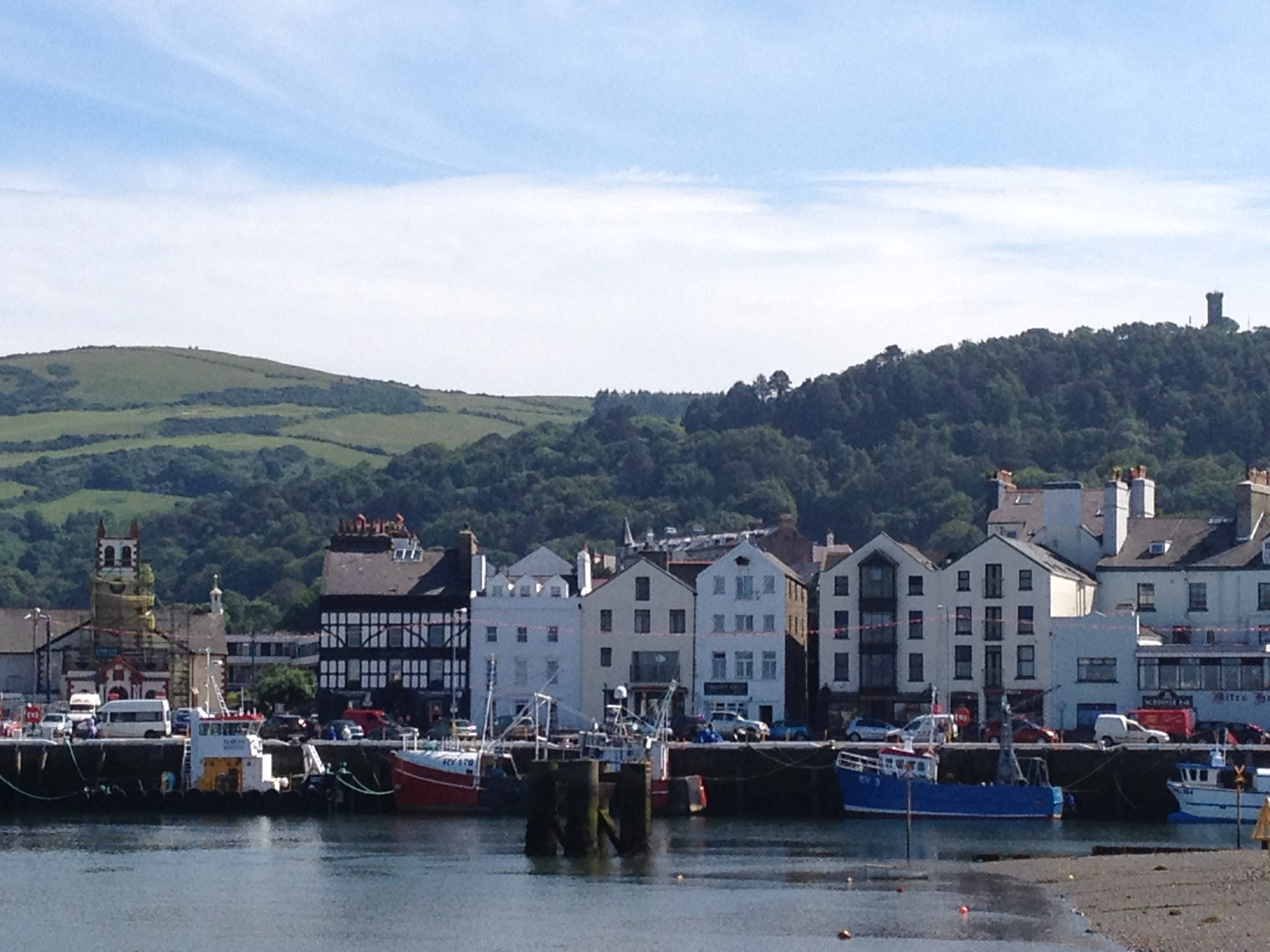
- Ramsey Quayside and fishing boats with Albert Tower seen in the top-right

- Location within the Isle of Man
- Population: 8,288 (2021 census)
- OS grid reference: SC449943
  - Douglas: 15 miles (24 km)
- Parish: Ramsey
- Sheading: Ayre, Garff
- Crown dependency: Isle of Man
- Post town: ISLE OF MAN
- Postcode district: IM8
- Dialling code: 01624 / 07624
- Police: Isle of Man
- Fire: Isle of Man
- Ambulance: Isle of Man
- House of Keys: Ramsey Town

Ramsey (Manx: Rhumsaa) is a coastal town in the north of the Isle of Man. It is the island's largest town after Douglas was granted city status in 2024. (Note: Although Onchan has a higher population, unlike Ramsey it is not considered to be a town.) Ramsey's population is 8,288 according to the 2021 Census. It has one of the biggest harbours on the island, and has a prominent semi-derelict pier, called the Queen's Pier (currently under restoration). It was formerly one of the main points of communication with Scotland. Ramsey has also been a route for several invasions by the Vikings and Scots.

Ramsey is also known as "Royal Ramsey" due to royal visits by Queen Victoria and Prince Albert in 1847 and by King Edward VII and Queen Alexandra in 1902.

== History ==
The name of the town derives from the Old Norse hrams-á, meaning "wild garlic river", More specifically, it refers to the plant known as ramsons, buckrams or wild garlic, in Latin Allium ursinum.

The Isle of Man has been an important strategic location in conflicts between the Norse rulers of Man and the Isles, and the Scots and English. Smugglers and pirates were also common at many times in Manx history.

Ramsey was the landing place of the Viking warrior Godred Crovan around 1079: he was determined to subjugate the island and make it his kingdom. On Sky Hill, two miles (3 kilometres) inland, an important battle was fought; this resulted in a period of Viking rule, influencing the development of the Manx nation and many of the traditions that continue today.

Godred's son, King Olaf, was murdered by his nephew Reginald near Ramsey harbour in 1154, and two years later the Chronicle of Man states that the ships of Somerled came to Ramsey during a conflict which would lead to the division of the kingdom of Man and to Somerled taking the Kingship of the Isles (the Hebrides).

On 17 May 1313 Robert the Bruce landed at Ramsey "with a multitude of ships" from the fleet of his friend, Angus Og Macdonald, Lord of the Isles, on his way to capturing Castle Rushen.

Captain François Thurot, a then-famous French privateer, and notorious scourge of the British fleet, was defeated off the north-west of the island in February 1760. His badly damaged, captured ship was brought into Ramsey Bay after the battle. Thurot's actions had been part of a planned French invasion of Britain. In previous years Thurot had traded between Ireland and the Isle of Man and had been well liked by many Manx people, and regarded as an intelligent gentleman. Several cottages and bridges were built using timbers from the wrecked ship: hence Thurot Cottage and Thurot Bridge.

Pirate radio station Radio Caroline North was based in Ramsey Bay from 1964–68 and supplied with provisions from Ramsey.

During World War II, thirty boarding houses on the North Shore were requisitioned for the Mooragh Internment Camp.

== Climate and geography ==
Ramsey is in the sunniest area of the Isle of Man, with relatively low rainfall. This is because Ramsey is in a 'rain shadow' just to the north-east of the hills at North Barrule, on the edge of the northern plain of the island. Rain clouds coming from the prevailing wind direction, the south-west, tend to lose most of their moisture over the hills before they reach Ramsey.

Ramsey is built mostly on sandy ground and has miles of sandy beaches. To the north of Ramsey the beaches run continuously to the north tip of the island. On the southern edge of Ramsey, at the edge of the hills, are a network of woods and glens: Ballure Walk, Lhergy Frissel and Elfin Glen. The Millennium Way and other paths and roads lead up to and across the upland heath ('the tops' and 'the hills').

== Transport and infrastructure ==
=== Shipping ===
Ramsey is home to the second busiest port on the island, handling a wide range of general cargo. The port was formerly used as an operating base by the Isle of Man Steam Packet Company for both cargo and passenger services. The company operated scheduled services to Liverpool and Whitehaven in addition to which during the summer months steamers would call at the Queen's Pier whilst en-route to Douglas from Belfast and Ardrossan.

The port is the headquarters of the local shipping line Mezeron, as it was formerly for the Ramsey Steamship Company, until it ceased trading in 2014.

Star of India is an iron-hulled sailing ship, built in 1863 in Ramsey, Isle of Man, as the full-rigged ship Euterpe.

=== Buses ===
Ramsey serves as the main terminus for the northern network of Bus Vannin, providing local services to Andreas, Ballaugh, Jurby, Sulby and Bride. In addition it provides an on-demand service to Ronaldsway Airport and main services to Peel and to Douglas via Laxey.

=== Rail ===
At one time, the town was served by both the Manx Electric Railway and the Isle of Man Railway. The first rail link was established by the Isle of Man Railway in 1879, transferring to the Manx Northern Railway in 1880. The line ran via Sulby, Ballaugh and Kirk Michael to St John's, where it connected to the main Douglas – Peel line and with the Foxdale Railway. The railway was largely financed by the prosperity of the Foxdale Mines, for which it was used to haul ore trains from Foxdale to the Ramsey quayside for shipment. Return trains would haul coal back to Foxdale to power the pumping houses of the mines.

Ramsey is also the northern terminus of the Manx Electric Railway. Initially linking Douglas to Laxey, the line from Laxey to Ramsey was opened on 2 August 1898 by the Lieutenant Governor, John Henniker-Major, 5th Baron Henniker. At that date the line ran as far as Ballure, on the outskirts of Ramsey. The final extension to the centre of Ramsey was opened on 24 July 1899.

=== Air ===
For a period between 1935 and 1937, Hall Caine Airport, just outside the town, operated scheduled air services to English, Scottish and Irish airports. Both Sir Thomas Henry Hall Caine's sons, Gordon Hall Caine and Derwent Hall Caine, were particularly keen on the development of an aerodrome on the site, as they saw it as another memorial to their late father. They also wished to involve the Ramsey town commissioners in the project, as they felt the aerodrome would bring immense benefit to the town. Hall Caine Airport officially came into being on 30 April 1935.

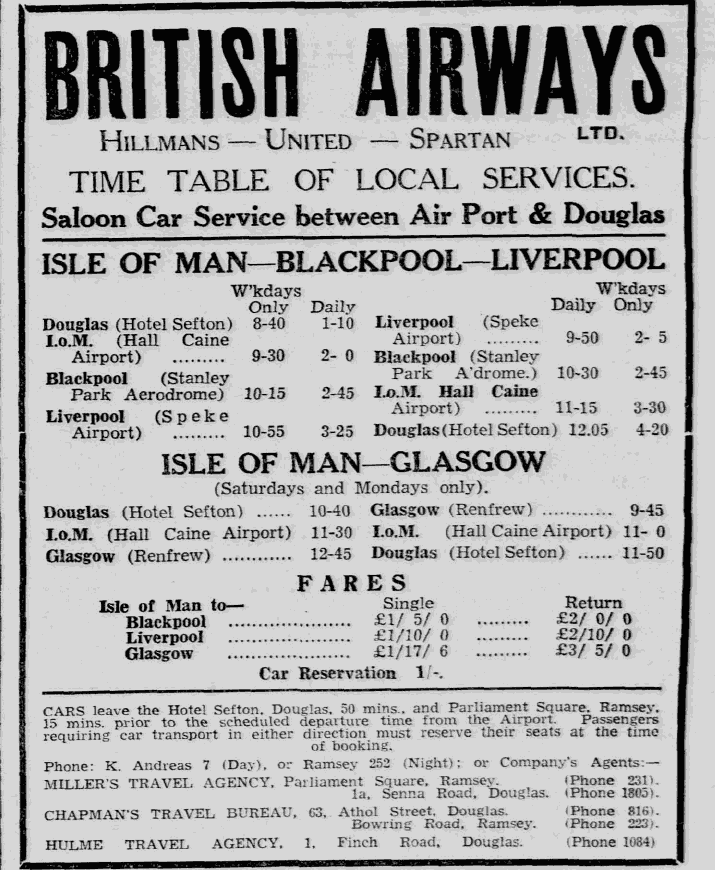
British Airways Ltd's Hall Caine Schedule, summer 1936

Scheduled services proved successful in 1935 and 1936, with Hillman's Airways and later British Airways Ltd and Northern and Scottish Airways providing scheduled services to Belfast, Glasgow, Blackpool and Liverpool, where passengers could connect with services to London. There was also an air link between Hall Caine and Ronaldsway Airport for air mail. The primary reason for the cessation of services from Hall Caine was a y of services operated by Northern and Scottish. Northern and Scottish and Manx Airways Ltd entered into an undertaking at Ronaldsway. This resulted in Manx Airways covering the schedules to Liverpool, Blackpool, Carlisle and Belfast which were formerly operated by Northern and Scottish, leaving only the Glasgow service being operated from Hall Caine. This was a severe blow to Ramsey, coming as it did at the beginning of the tourist season. Services from Hall Caine to Glasgow resumed in early June, aimed primarily at the increased traffic as a result of the TT Races, which continued throughout the month.

The Ramsey Ratepayers Association petitioned the Lieutenant Governor of the Isle of Man, Sir Montague Butler, with a view to his intervening to preserve commercial air operations from Hall Caine. The cancellation by Northern and Scottish Airways also led to a special meeting of the Ramsey Commissioners. It was hoped that Railway Air Services would have commenced operations from Hall Caine, but any hope proved unfounded.

Piloted by Capt. McGeow, the final commercial flight from Hall Caine Airport departed at 4:15 pm on Saturday, 2 October 1937.

== Sights ==
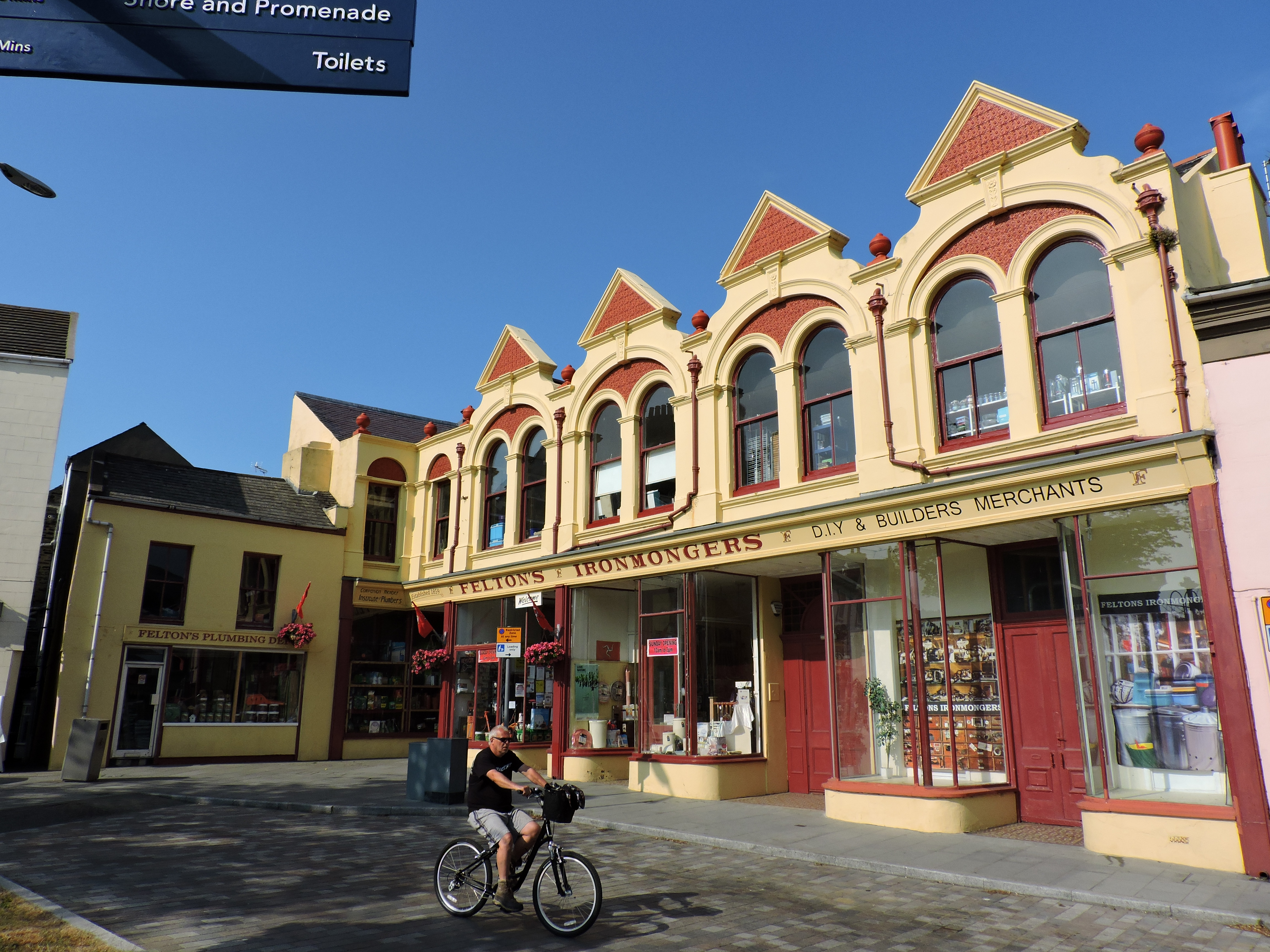
Felton's Ironmongers, Ramsey

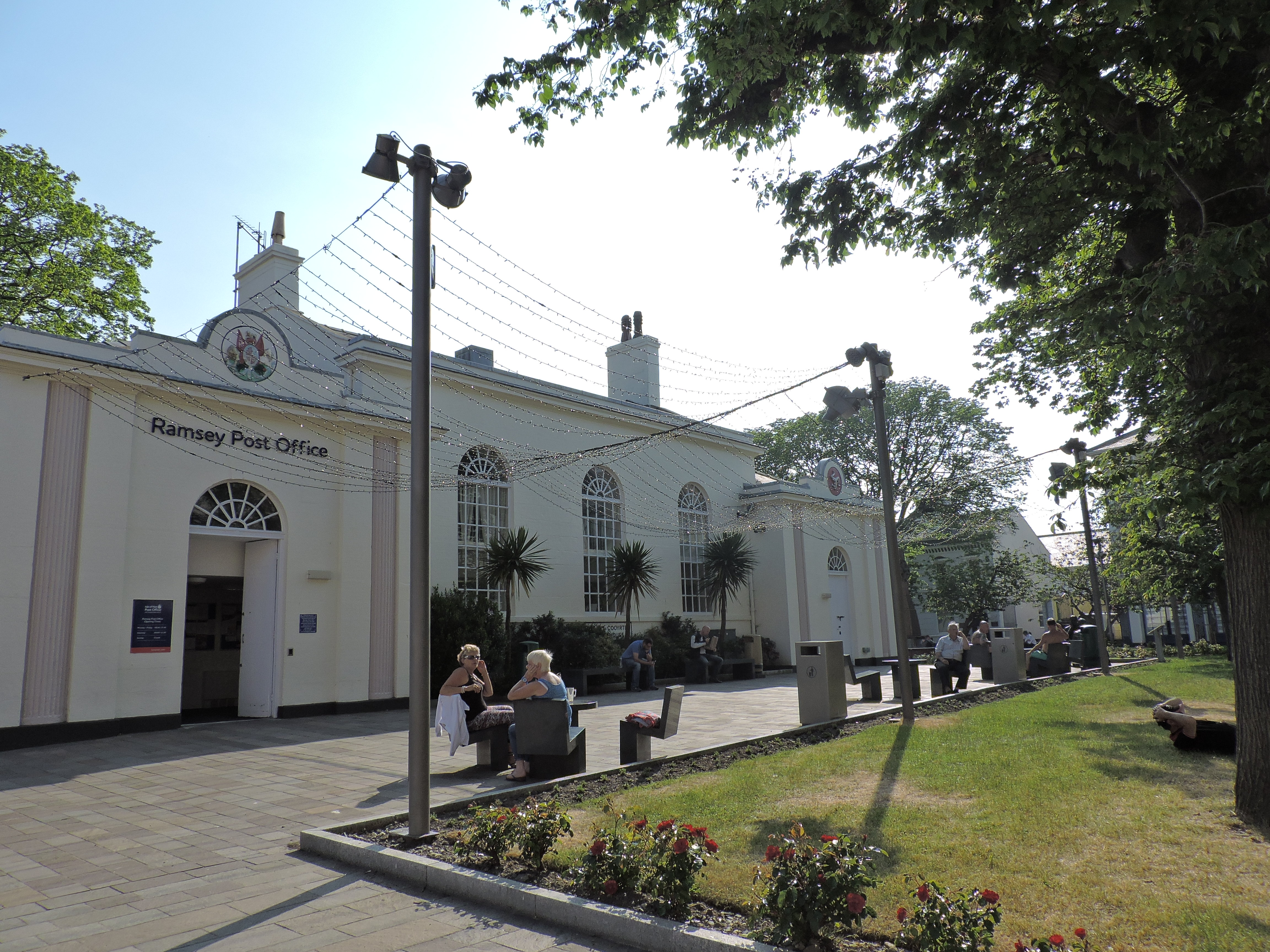
Ramsey 'Courthouse'

Ramsey (Plaza) tram station is the northern terminus of the Manx Electric Railway, and Ramsey is the start of the mountain section of the Snaefell Mountain Course used for the annual Isle of Man TT and Manx Grand Prix motorcycle races. A popular vantage point is Ramsey Hairpin, where enthusiasts gather to watch the racers. Another popular spot is Parliament Square in the middle of town. There are also opportunities for walking, cycling, kayaking, and other outdoor activities.

The Millennium Way footpath ends 1 mi (1.6 km) from the centre of the town on the A3 road at the foot of Sky Hill.

Mooragh Park, on the north side of the Sulby river, is a 19th-century park with a large boating lake where boats (canoes, pedaloes etc) are available for hire. It was originally part of a salt marsh but was purchased and developed by the town to encourage visitors. Mooragh Park has a small water park, two cafés, a BMX club, skate park, tennis courts, basketball area, outdoor exercise equipment, and a children's playground. The park is mostly on the level and has disabled toilets.

Ramsey's original swimming pool in the town centre was converted into a ten-pin bowling alley in 2010. The new Northern Swimming Pool opened in January 2009 on the Mooragh Promenade.

The Albert Tower was built to commemorate the royal visit of Prince Albert on 20 September 1847. Queen Victoria's Royal Yacht anchored in the bay, when heavy seas made it impossible to enter Douglas Harbour. Recovering from seasickness, Victoria remained on the yacht, leaving Prince Albert to venture ashore. He climbed to the top of the hill, from where he viewed the town of Ramsey and the northern plain. The hill was renamed Albert Mount and a year later the tower's foundation was laid. The tower is made of granite and rises 45 feet (14 m) high. It is a landmark not only for the town of Ramsey, but also for the north of the Isle of Man. There is a public path leading up the hill for people to visit the tower.

Another distinctive landmark of the town is the Queen's Pier, an iron pier which was built in 1886. It is about 650 metres or 700 yards long. As well as recreational purposes, the pier had a landing stage for visiting ships. It has been closed for many years due to health and safety concerns, although subject to many re-opening appeals. It had its own tramway. The Queen's Pier has had significant renovation work, and is open for visitors on Sunday afternoons in the summer. The lease has been taken on by the Queens Pier Restoration Trust, who aim to restore it gradually.

The Grove Museum of Victorian Life (Manx National Heritage) is located in the northern suburbs on the A9 (Andreas Road).

== Leisure amenities and sport ==
Among the various leisure venues in Ramsey are a swimming pool, bowling alley, a rural museum (the Grove Museum of Rural Life), and Milntown House at the western edge of the town.

There are several sports clubs, including a rugby club, a football club and Ramsey Youth Centre and Old Boys F.C., a hockey team, a Gaelic football team, Ramsey Ravens swimming team and a golf club. There is an active sailing club, the Manx Sailing and Cruising Club, which promotes an annual Round the Island sailing race as well as regularly scheduled dinghy and cruiser races. Ramsey Angling Club holds regular sea angling competitions.

== Health and education ==
Ramsey has a modern junior school, a secondary comprehensive school, and the Ramsey Cottage Hospital.

== Places of religious worship ==
The town has a number of churches, including Our Lady, Star of the Sea & St Maughold Church and St Paul's.

== Industry and commerce ==
Ramsey has an active shipyard and industrial workshops. The main street has a range of independent shops, including a butcher, ironmonger, and shops selling clothes, gifts and homewares. There are several pubs, cafes, restaurants and a Farmers' Market every Saturday. The town's Mooragh Park area has a 3-star hotel.

The harbour is used by fishing and small leisure boats, and small freight boats from the Mezeron shipping company. There is a swing bridge for pedestrians and vehicles, built in 1892, that crosses the harbour.

== Wildlife and nature ==
Wildlife around Ramsey reflects the mix of landscape: with sandy coast and estuary at Ramsey, wooded glens and rocky coasts just to the south-east, and hills and moors to the south-west, plus Ballaugh Curragh (wooded swamp) and productive farmland inland, and isolated sandy shores and dunes to the north.

Ramsey Bay was the island's first Marine Nature Reserve, set up to protect fisheries and marine wildlife. The protected area acts as a 'nursery area' for fish and other creatures and plants, which can then move out to restock surrounding areas.

Ramsey shore and estuary provide a feeding area for birds, including oystercatcher, redshank and ringed plover on the shore, and geese, swans and ducks in the harbour. The inner harbour footpath (toward Mooragh Park) is a scrap of rich original saltmarsh habitat plus many land plants (also a sun trap). There is a big patch of salt marsh in Poyll Dooey park up the harbour.

Just south-east of Ramsey, in Maughold, are rugged wooded glens open to the public, and rocky coasts, headlands and beaches, with much of the area accessible by road, footpath, and electric tram.

Inland wildlife areas include Sulby Glen (a rugged grassy glen full of bluebells in spring) and Ballaugh Curragh: a wildlife-rich patchwork of semi-wilderness, swamp, woodland and agriculture, continuous since the last Ice Age.

=== Wildlife hotspots around Ramsey ===
Maughold Head

Seals, cormorants, chough, wildfowl and seabirds, coastal wildflowers.

The Ayres/Point of Ayre

Lichen heath, sand-dunes, little terns, Arctic terns, winter migratory geese, divers, gannets, other wildfowl, basking sharks, seals, lizards, various butterflies and moths. Includes the Manx Wildlife Trust Ayres Nature Discovery Centre and Nature Trail, and the Manx BirdLife Point of Ayre National Reserve which includes areas of open water.

== Music, culture and events ==
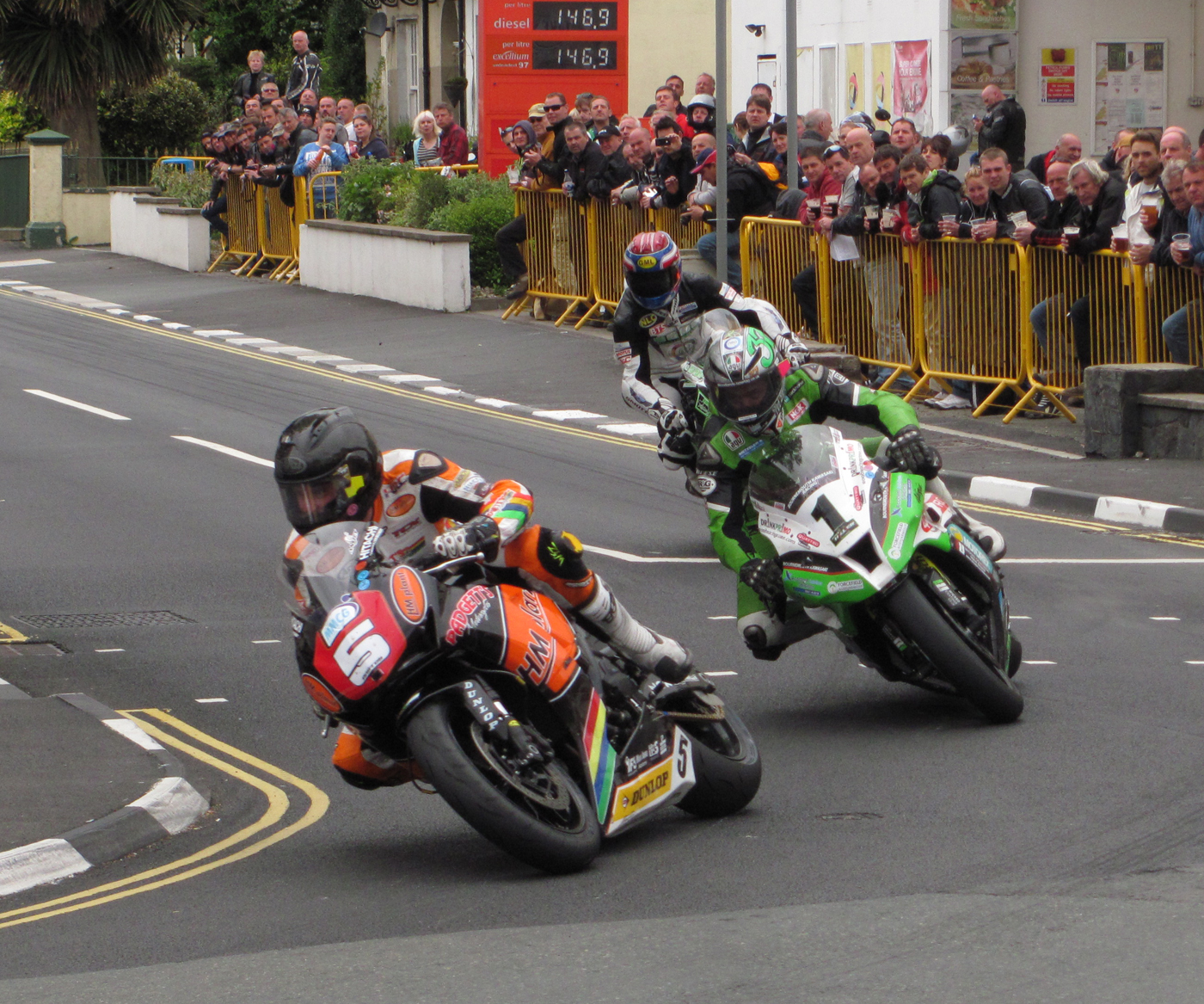
2013 TT races through Parliament Square

Ramsey has been a centre for the revival of Manx traditional music and culture. 'Shennaghys Jiu' ("Tradition Today") Celtic music festival runs in springtime, usually late March. There are two separate live folk music nights at the Mitre Hotel, on Thursdays (singaround) and Fridays (Irish session).

The busiest times of year are Shennagys Jiu in March, Cyclefest in May, TT fortnight in late May / early June, (especially Ramsey Sprint Day, when thousands of biking fans visit to watch motorbike drag sprints on Mooragh Promenade), Manx Grand Prix/ Manx Classic motorbike race fortnight in late August, Ramsey National Week in early July, with many music and culture events, and 'Ramsey Rocks' held on the Quayside one Friday in summer.

== Politics, civic authority and local government ==
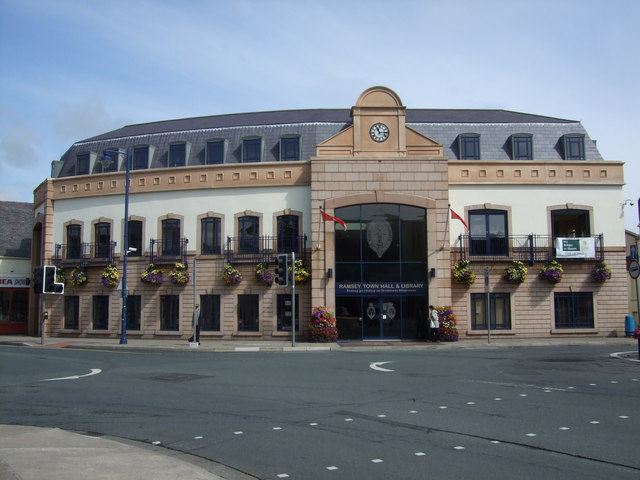
Ramsey Town Hall

The local authority is the Ramsey Town Commissioners. Ramsey is also a House of Keys constituency, electing two MHKs. As of 2021, these were Alex Allinson (independent) and Lawrie Hooper (Liberal Vannin). Ramsey Town Hall was completed in 2002.

=== MHKs and Elections ===
This information is incomplete.

Year	Election	Turnout	Candidates
1867	General Election		Rev William Bell Christian, elected; ?
1875	General Election		Rev William Bell Christian, elected; ?
1881	General Election		Rev William Bell Christian, elected; ?
[many years]		Mr. Cowell elected (ca. 1900 moved to Red Deer, Alberta)	
1901	By-Election	?	Sir Hall Caine CH KBE, 458 votes, elected; Philip Kermode, 191 votes
1903	General Election	?	Sir Hall Caine CH KBE, 503 votes, elected; P M C Kermode, 291 votes
1929	General Election	?	Albert Teare; William Alcock, elected; ?
1934	General Election	?	?; William Alcock
1946	General Election	?	Spencer Kelly (elected)
1951	General Election	?	Spencer Kelly (elected)
2 MHKs now elected for Ramsey. Had been 1 since first election in 1867.
1956	General Election	?	Spencer Kelly (elected)
1962	General Election	?	Spencer Kelly (elected); Sir Henry Sugden (elected)
1981	General Election	?	Charles A Cain (elected); Dr Hugo Douglas Teare (elected)
1984	By-Election	?	Allan Bell (elected)
1986	General Election	66%	Allan Bell (1212 votes, elected); Brigadier Norman Butler (755 votes, elected); SL Morrey (397 votes); PJ Quirk (212 votes); RC Cowley (140 votes); PA Lebiedzinski (113 votes); JE Skinner (68 votes)
1991	General Election	70.6%	Allan Bell (1023 votes, elected); Terry Groves (909 votes, elected); RB Quine (744 votes); WJ Irving (185 votes); SJ Quigley (178 votes); FJA Hughes (145 votes); OD Hibbert (99 votes)
1996	General Election	66.5%	Leonard Singer (2059 votes, elected); Allan Bell (2056 votes, elected); Terry Groves (1763 votes); Ray Kniveton (1702 votes); Richard Leventhorpe (1372 votes); David Quirk (1143 votes); Ellis Killey (775 votes); Mark Kermode (559 votes)
2001	General Election	66%	Allan Bell, 2260 votes, elected; Leonard Singer, 2048 votes, elected; Annie Craine, 1794 votes; Brian Beattie, 564 votes; Joseph Rooney, 116 votes
Following the elevation to the Council of Leonard Singer.
2003	By-Election	66.5%	Annie Craine, 1509 votes, elected; Kevin Mayne, 752 votes; Myles Hardman, 634 votes
2006	General Election		Annie Craine, 1969 votes, elected; Allan Bell, 1768 votes, elected; Leonard Singer, 1621 votes; Captain Nigel Malpass RN (Liberal Vannin), 673 votes
2011	General Election		Allan Bell, 1988 votes, elected; Leonard Singer, 1911 votes, elected; Annie Craine, 1817 votes; Linda Bowers-Kasch (Liberal Vannin), 427 votes; Lawrie Hooper, 310 votes; John McDonough, 243 votes

== Election results since 2016 ==
In 2014, Tynwald approved recommendations from the Boundary Review Commission, which saw the reform of the island's electoral boundaries.

General election 2021: Ramsey
Party	Candidate	Votes	%
Liberal Vannin	Lawrie Lee Hooper	1,657	26.3
Independent	Alexander John Allinson	1,557	24.7
Independent	Robert Douglas Cowell	679	10.8
Independent	Luke Parker	664	10.5
Independent	Simon Edgar Mann	555	8.8
Independent	Erica Lesley Spencer	438	7.0
Independent	Leonard Ian Singer	405	6.4
Independent	Jonathan David Kinrade	345	5.5
Total votes		6,300	
Total ballots		3,367	
Rejected ballots		4	
Turnout		3,371	53.6
Registered electors		6,288	

General election 2016: Ramsey
Party	Candidate	Votes	%
Independent	Alexander John Allinson	2,946	47.1
Liberal Vannin	Lawrie Lee Hooper	1,471	23.5
Independent	Leonard Ian Singer	886	14.2
Independent	Nicholas Lyndon Crowe	716	11.4
Independent	John David McDonough	236	3.8
Total votes		6,255	
Total ballots		3,485	
Rejected ballots		15	
Turnout		3,500	61.1
Registered electors		5,726	

== Notable people ==
- William Gill (1795 in Ramsay – 1858 in Douglas) was a Manx merchant navy officer who served as commanding officer of numerous Isle of Man Steam Packet Company vessels. Gill was the first recognised captain of the line, retiring with the rank of Commodore
- Andrew Roche (born 1971), road cyclist
- Beckii Cruel (born 1995), businesswoman, YouTuber, singer and dancer

== See also ==
- 54 Air-Sea Rescue Marine Craft Unit RAF
- Ramsey Grammar School
