= Curraghs =

Wetland on the Isle of Man

Designations

Ramsar Wetland
- Official name: Ballaugh Curragh
- Designated: 6 September 2006
- Reference no.: 1642

The Curragh or Ballaugh Curragh is a wetland in Ballaugh parish in the north-west of the Isle of Man. The area has a rich and varied biodiversity and is also the location of the Curraghs Wildlife Park, a zoo and nature reserve that incorporates the wetlands.

== History ==
During the last ice age the area was covered in sheets of ice. When this ice retreated, a depression was left at the bottom of the northern hills and the wetlands were formed in this basin.

Over the years the land has been used to graze animals and grow hay, one of the few exploitable crops suited to the conditions of the wetlands. The Curraghs has also been a valuable resource for humans, as well as providing aesthetic appeal; the area is rich in peat, which was used as a fuel in the island's homes. The nearby village of Kirk Michael was a great consumer of the peat in the Curraghs.

It was the exploitation of peat that made the land slightly drier than it is today. When the practice of peat cutting was discontinued, the ditches in the area filled with water and bogs were formed.

In the 1930s, the Manx government intended to make a profit by growing New Zealand flax on the Curraghs. This plan failed, but in the 1950s the government pressed ahead with another plan to drain the Curraghs, so that the area could be extensively farmed. However, with the land 15 m above sea level, it was decided that it was not economically viable to drain the wetlands.

In 1963, much of the area came under the control of the Manx government, and two years later the 26-acre (11 ha) Curraghs Wildlife Park was opened. In 1990, protection of the government-controlled area was transferred to Manx National Heritage; and in 2006 about 477 acres, or 193 hectares, of the Curragh became a designated Ramsar site. This means that the site is a globally important area of wetland habitat.

== Ecosystem ==
=== Fauna ===
The area is deemed important as it is inhabited by the second-largest roost of hen harriers in Europe; a bird that descends on the area during the winter months. Other birds include peregrine falcons, merlins, robins, willow warblers, song thrushes and dunnocks among others. There is also a subspecies of wren, possibly unique to the island.

The area is also notable for its diversity of butterflies, and the Wildlife Park, whilst home to over 100 animals from around the world (including pelicans, gibbons, otters and penguins), also features a butterfly walk, an opportunity for visitors to see the insects in an environment designed for them. One notable species is the orange tip.

Ballaugh Curraghs has a persistent breeding colony of wild wallabies, said to be the largest in the British Isles, descended from two that escaped from the wildlife park some years ago. They seem to occupy a similar ecological niche to hares.

=== Flora ===
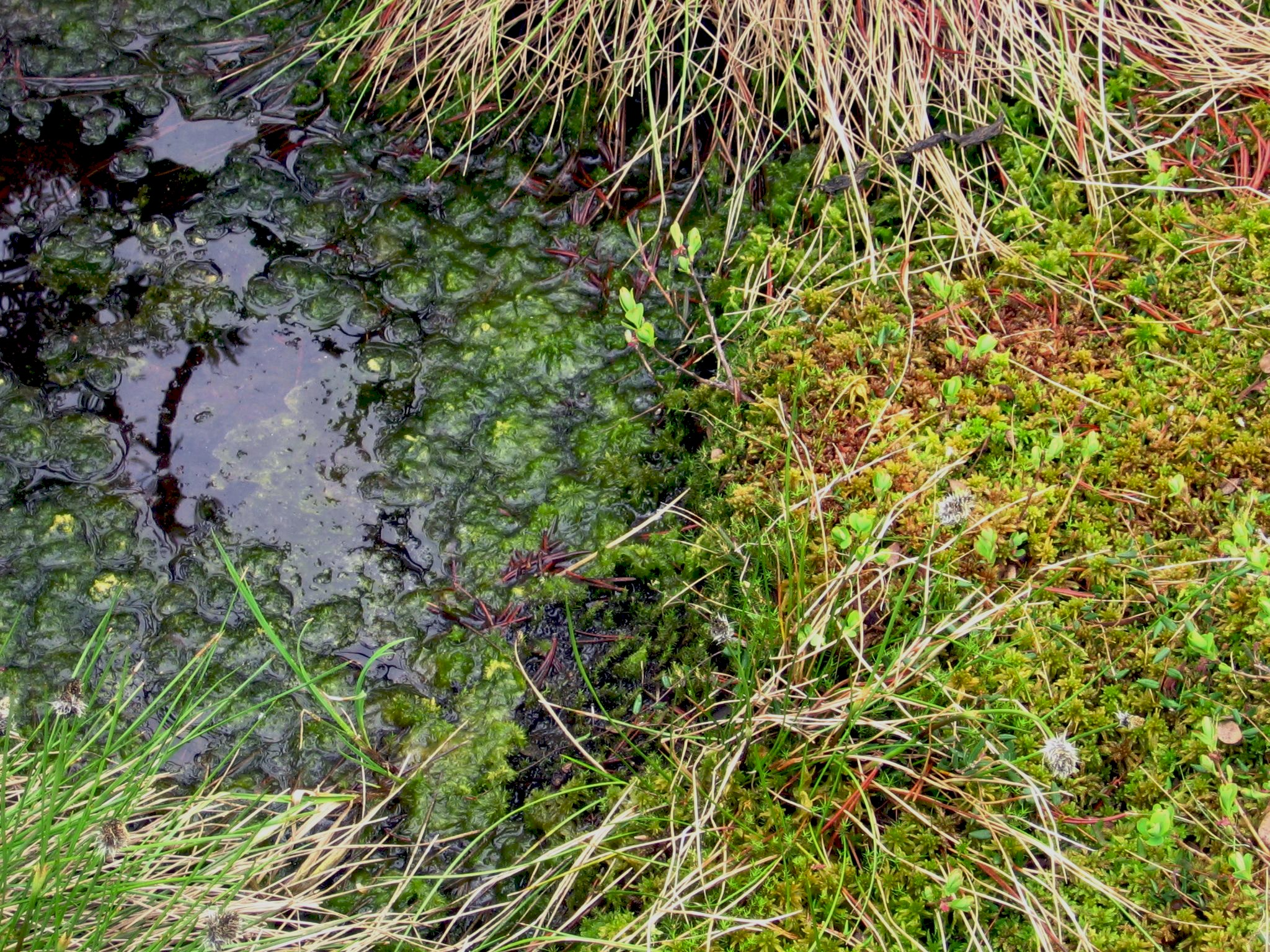
A Sphagnum bog, not located at the Curraghs

The Curraghs are a varied scrubland, including willow and bog myrtle scrub. Sphagnum moss, a common species, is responsible for the high levels of peat in the area. The peat and wetland topography of the area combine to create a series of bogs. The abundance of peat has had a direct effect on the island's human inhabitants over the years, with the peat being used as fuel in people's homes.

The Curraghs are also home to six different species of orchid, including the heath spotted orchid.

== Etymology ==
In Manx Gaelic, a curragh originally referred to open wetland or mites habitats; however as the Ballaugh Curragh has dried up and transitioned from open mire into willow carr and scrub habitat, now widely found in the Isle of Man, the meaning of the word curragh has changed accordingly.
