= Baldrine =

Village on the Isle of Man

Coordinates: 54.20211°N 4.41190°W

Baldrine: Manx: Balley drine
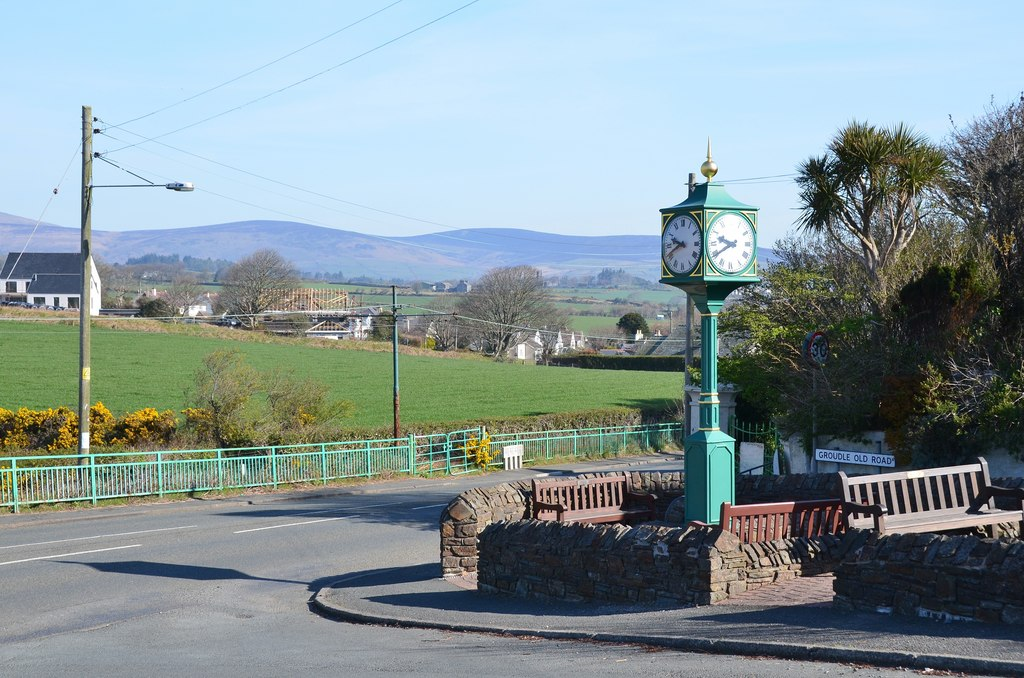
- Baldrine Millennium Clock

- Location within the Isle of Man
- Parish: Lonan
- Sheading: Garff
- Crown dependency: Isle of Man
- Postcode district: IM
- Police: Isle of Man
- Fire: Isle of Man
- Ambulance: Isle of Man

Baldrine (Manx: Balley drine 'blackthorn town') is a village in the Isle of Man. It is close to the east coast of the island, about 3 km south of Laxey and 6 km NE of Douglas. It is in the historic parish of Lonan, in the sheading of Garff. For administrative purposes it is in the parish district of Garff, and it is also in the House of Keys constituency of Garff.

== Geography ==
Baldrine is located on the A2 road, the coast road between Douglas and Ramsey and the area includes three halts (or stations) on the Manx Electric Railway: Baldrine, Sunnycott and Garwick Glen. The River Gawne flows through the village and then through Garwick Glen down towards Garwick Beach at Garwick Bay (part of Laxey Bay).

Also within the bounds of Baldrine is Ballannette Country Park, a nature reserve which includes a group of lakes and bird watching locations. The country park is a registered Dark Sky Park, where light pollution is restricted.

== History ==
The name of the village dates back to at least 1643 and comes from the Manx words balley drine, which translates to "town of the blackthorn".

It has had two Primitive Methodist chapels, the first was built in 1843, under the direction of Anne Kelly, a resident of nearby Barroose. Her husband, Thomas Kelly, sold 150 square yards (130 m^{2}) of land for the chapel for 2 shillings. Anne Kelly laid the first stone, and prayed upon it for the head of the church to bless the building. The building would cost £100 to erect.

The second chapel was built in 1883 when the congregation started to exceed the first chapel's capacity, at a cost of £383. The new chapel could seat 118, and included a Sunday school for the local children.

In 1850, the Liverpool Arms public house was opened in the village. The pub was shut in 2017, and the brewery that owned it put it up for sale, on the understanding that it would no longer be a pub. However, the local council did not allow the change of use, stating that the building should remain a pub.

In 2018 Laxey Bay was designated as a Marine Nature Reserve.

== Other places of worship ==
Baldrine has a Methodist church and a Buddhist Theravada temple and monastery.
