= Ballabeg, Lonan =

Coordinates: 54.212°N 4.406°W

Ballabeg: Manx: Balley Beg
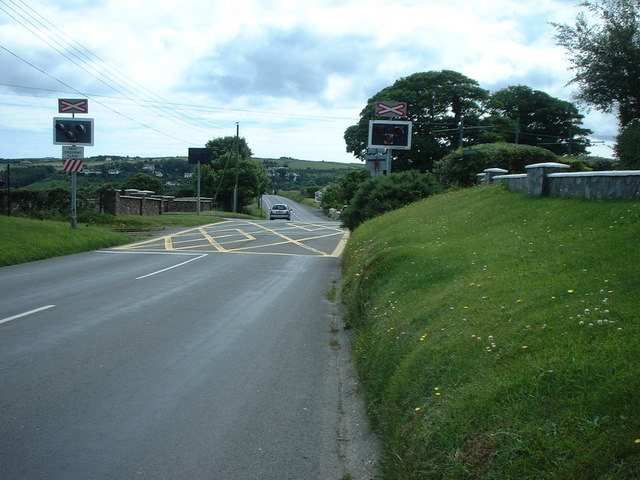

- Location within the Isle of Man
- Population: <40
- OS grid reference: SC431822
  - Douglas: 9 km
- Parish: Lonan
- Sheading: Garff
- Crown dependency: Isle of Man
- Post town: ISLE OF MAN
- Postcode district: IM4 7HB
- Dialling code: 01624
- Police: Isle of Man
- Fire: Isle of Man
- Ambulance: Isle of Man
- House of Keys: Garff

There are about eight small places on the Isle of Man with the name Ballabeg. The name Ballabeg derives from the Manx Balley Beg which means small homestead; although the spelling is different, it is pronounced approximately the same as the English name.

This article is about the hamlet of Ballabeg in the parish of Lonan, on the east of the island, overlooking Laxey Bay. The settlement dates from at least 1643, when a Ballabegg was recorded on the Castle Rushen Manorial Roll, under the ownership of Furness Abbey. It is about 300 metres from the sea shore.

Ballabeg in Lonan is located 9 km or nearly 6 miles NE of the capital, Douglas, and 2 km south of the village of Laxey. The hamlet only consists of a farm and a handful of houses, but also is home to the small Ballabeg tram stop which celebrated its centenary in 2005. When the Manx Electric Railway was built through Ballabeg in 1894 an ancient Celtic keeill and adjoining burial ground were discovered. The keeill was known as Keeill Killane (with many spelling variations), shortened to Kilkillane, and gives its name to a nearby stream known as Strooan ny Carlane / Kilane and a house in the hamlet called Kilan. No traces of the keeill survive today. Many lintel graves, buried in triplets, were found at the site. It is believed that the bodies were exhumed and removed, while a large wooden cross and plaque, since removed, marked the site for many years.

A small white cottage, known as the schoolhouse, still stands in Ballabeg next to the site of the former keeill. The building was used as a schoolhouse, religious chapel and social cottage where the locals would gather to play music and tell stories. It is currently being used as a warehouse.

The landscape of Ballabeg is mainly agricultural land used for the grazing of sheep. There are areas of mature and newly planted woodland (including a nationally important cliff-side ancient oak forest remnant), gorse, brooghs (headlands) and small dubs or ponds. The A2 Douglas to Ramsey road bisects the settlement. The Manx Electric Railway runs through the settlement and has a level crossing there. The Raad ny Foillan long-distance path also passes through Ballabeg.

The settlement has no defined boundaries but is said to be bounded by the Raad Ballagawne in the south, the Irish Sea (Laxey Bay) in the east, Church Road in Ballacannel to the north and the old road from Lonan Church to Raad Ballagawne in the west.

In 2018 Laxey Bay was designated as a Marine Nature Reserve.
