= John Quine =

Manx writer and clergyman (1857–1940)

Canon John Quine
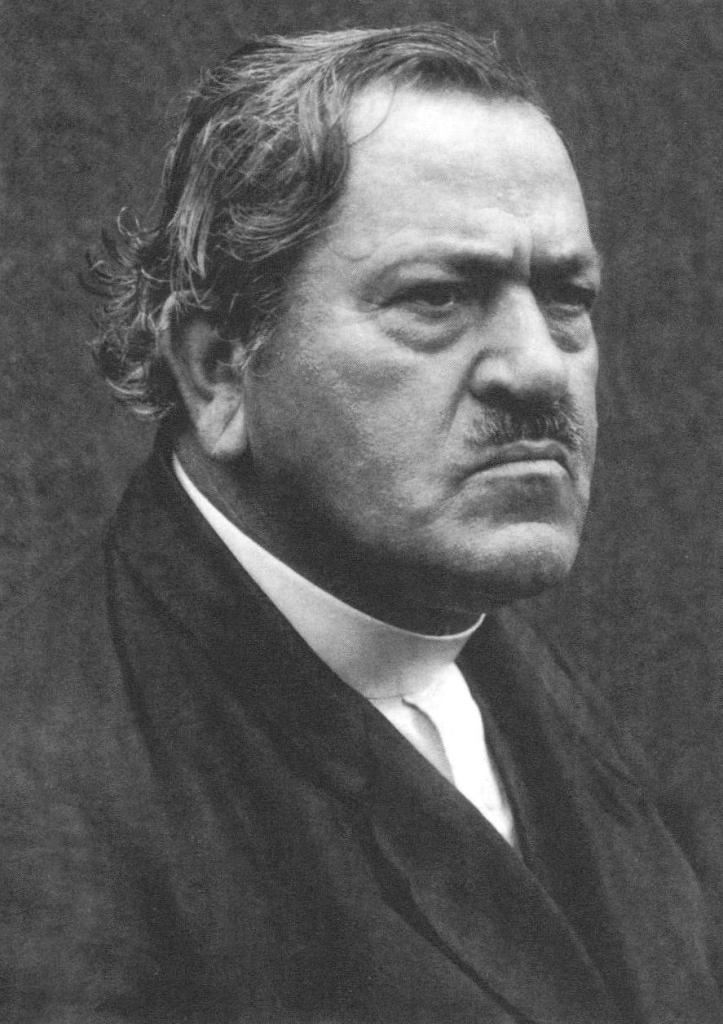
- Born: 5 May 1857; Glenmoar Mill, German, Isle of Man
- Died: 29 February 1940 (aged 82); Lonan, Isle of Man

John Quine (5 May 1857 – 29 February 1940) was a Manx clergyman, scholar, novelist, and playwright. He is perhaps best remembered for his 1897 novel, The Captain of the Parish.

== Early life ==
Third son of a Foxdale miller, William Quine and Christian (née Callister), John Quine was introduced to Latin and the classics from an early age. He attended King William's College, near to which the family moved when Quine was twelve years old, when they settled in Ballasalla. After winning numerous prizes at the school, Quine won an open scholarship to study Mathematics at Merton College, Oxford, in 1877.

Quine proved to be a popular and successful student at Oxford, being elected Postmaster (senior undergraduate scholar) at Merton whilst gaining great popularity amongst his peers thanks to his conversational brilliance. His enjoyment of Oxford was hampered only by the occasional consequences of his quick tongue and a lack of funds that he attributed to his father's miserliness. He gained his Bachelor of Arts in 1881 and his MA shortly afterwards, as well as taking his Holy orders.

Despite gaining his degree in mathematics, Quine developed his early interest in the classics into a passion which would last throughout his life. At Oxford he pursued courses in Greek and Latin literature as well as divinity. Upon graduation it was expected that he would go on to a successful career in the Church or the British Museum, but instead he returned to the Isle of Man, being by this time a staunch Manx Nationalist.

== Life on the Isle of Man ==
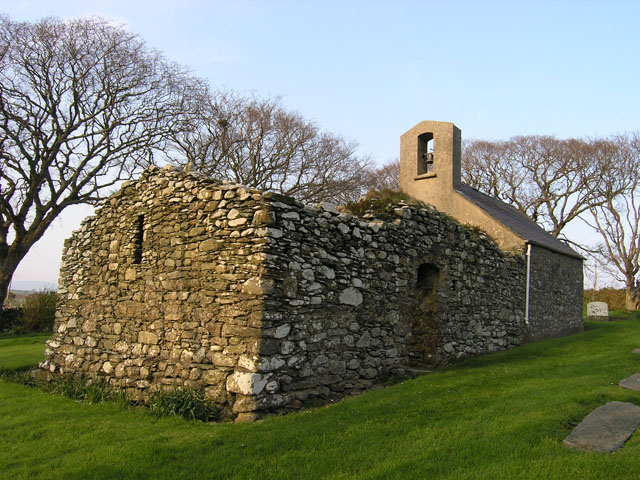
Old Lonan Church (St Adamnan's)

Upon leaving university in 1881, Quine became curate of Kirk Michael. Early in 1883 he became the Domestic Chaplain to Bishop Rowley Hill. In July 1883 Quine took up teaching, being appointed the headmaster of Douglas Grammar School. The art teacher at this time was Archibald Knox, who Quine has been credited with influencing with his interest in Celtic art.

In 1884 Quine married Mary Lindsay, the sister of the Bishop's Chaplain, who was described at the time as being a lady of great dignity and beauty. They first lived in the School House at 2 Dalton Road, but as their family grew circumstances forced them to move to a larger house at 52 Derby Square, Douglas. They would go on to eventually have eleven children, all of whom had their mother's maiden name as their middle name.

In 1895 Quine left his position as Headmaster to take up the Vicarage of Lonan, including the Chaplaincy of All Saints Church, Laxey, a position that he would hold until his death in 1940. He proved to be popular and successful in this role, despite his "sharp and occasional sarcastic tongue." Perhaps the most significant of his achievements in Lonan was his rescuing of Lonan Old Church from disrepair. Today it is a listed building of recognised national importance.

== Writing ==
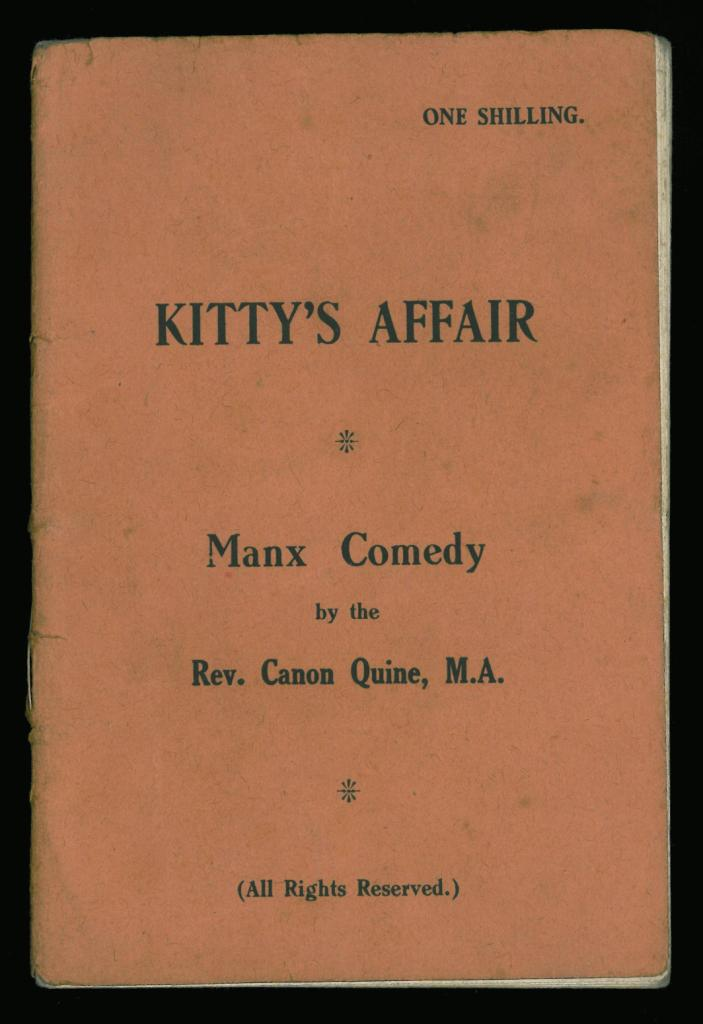
The front cover of Quine's 1909 play, Kitty's Affair

Quine's novel, The Captain of the Parish, was published in 1897 by Heinemann. It was well received by critics and public, with Mona Douglas commenting in the 1960s that the novel is a "classic of its genre" and that it "is accounted by many people the best Manx novel ever written." This is of particular note as Heinemann was also the publisher of Hall Caine, who has come to be considered as the Manx national novelist, not least because his Isle of Man-based novels, The Deemster (1887) and The Manxman (1894), established him as one of the most successful and well-respected novelists of the day.

Quine’s novel was greatly praised by the Manx national poet, T.E. Brown, whose poetry is quoted ahead of each and every section of the novel. Brown expressed his admiration in a personal letter written to Quine on 26 April 1897:

My blessings on you! you speak of inspiration, encouragement, what not, coming from me. With The Captain of the Parish I am supremely contented, I can die happy. To have had anything to do with the endeavour of such a work makes me very proud. Perhaps I have leavened you and my barm may stir in your young and vigorous veins. All right but, however that may be, I have got what I longed for, and, ever since I came to the island, conjectured a new Manx writer honestly suckled at a Manx breast. You will be faithful to us, and continue, and expand, and heighten the tradition, the sacred deposit. . . . You see I am excited, but how can I help it?

Quine was also the author of a comic play entitled Kitty's Affair. It was written in the Anglo-Manx dialect and it features a number of Manx types, including smugglers, farmers and maids. It was published in 1909 and received performances by several companies on the island.

He also published a number of guidebooks to aspects of the Isle of Man, including its Electric Railway, geography and history.

== Manx archaeology and history ==
Quine continued his great interest in ancient history and archaeology during his later life on the Isle of Man. He was twice president of the Isle of Man Natural History and Antiquarian Society and carried out much original research. His theories about Manx history were marked by their inventiveness and rejection of the accepted history of the Island. Most notable is his theory that the Isle of Man was "an integral part of the Roman Kingdom." Reports of one of his presentations to the IOMNHAS in 1917 states:

[Quine] claimed that the Cronks, hitherto believed to have been burial places or fortifications; were really artificial mounds used by the Roman engineers to assist in the triangulation and plotting out of lands; they were found at regular distances of Roman miles in proper alignment, and the connecting lines formed regular parallelograms and triangles when tested on the Ordnance Map. He regarded certain Manx place-names as corruptions of old Latin designations derived from Roman emperors, goddesses and heroes.

His other notable theories included the idea that Phoenician mariner merchants visited the island, and that Saint Patrick was born on the Isle of Man. It was generally considered that these theories were based on very little evidence and they have not been taken very seriously by the academic establishment. However, Mona Douglas was to later praise his skill in Manx archaeology and its early documents, writing that "there is hardly a branch of these subjects on which he has not written papers of profound scholarship and original thought."

== Later life ==
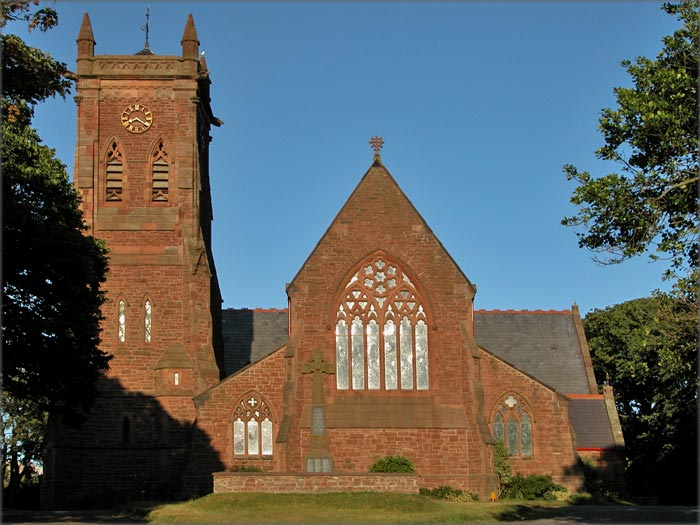
Peel Cathedral

In 1906 Quine was elected Chaplain to the House of Keys, a post he held until 1924. In 1909 he became the Canon of St. German's Church. His other positions of responsibility included being Chairman of the Lonan School Board and the Chairman of Lonan Board of Guardians. In 1916 he was elected Worshipful Master of the Maughold Freemason's Lodge.

Even unto the end of his life, Quine didn't own a car but was a keen walker. In contrast to his scanty knowledge of Manx Gaelic, Quine was fluent in French – it was in this language that he kept detailed diaries.

He remained a good friend with Archibald Knox throughout his life, commissioning works by him for his church in Lonan, including the war memorial and some silverware. It was Knox who created Quine's large slate headstone (although Knox was not able to finish it due to his own death). Quine died at the age of 82 on 29 February 1940.

== Publications ==
- The Captain of the Parish, London: Heinemann, 1897
- Isle of Man Illustrated, Mates of Bournemouth Illustrated Guides, 1899 and 1900
- Memorials of Manxland, Baume and Son, 1906
- Handbook en Route – 'Isle of Man': A Souvenir of Coast and Mountain Electric Railway, London: Joseph Causton, 1906
- Kitty's Affair, Douglas: Broadbent Ltd., 1909
- The Isle of Man. Cambridge County Geographies. 1911.
- Scenes of Manx History – 12th Century, Isle of Man: Clucas and Fargher, 1920
- Early Scribed Rocks of the Isle of Man with Notes on the Early Pottery, 1923 (from a lecture delivered 22 February 1922)
- Balnahawin: Including Flos Elleray's Holiday (edited by Julie Quine), 2014 (from previously unpublished papers)
- Cross's Folly (edited by Julie Quine), 2014 (from previously unpublished papers)
