= Baldrine railway station =

Railway station in Isle of Man, the UK

Baldrine Balley Drine
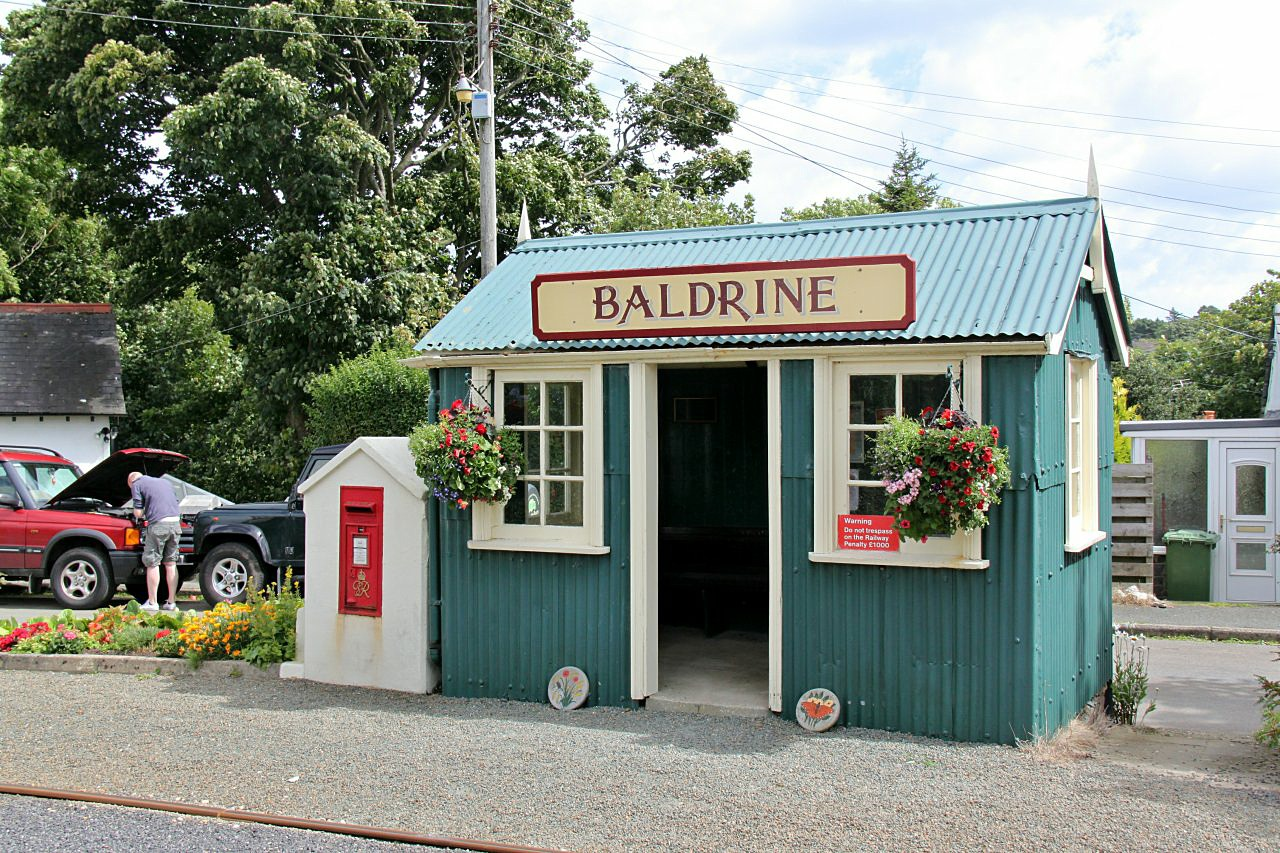

General information
- Location: Lonan, Isle Of Man
- Coordinates: 54.202266°N 4.412315°W
- Pole Nos.: 215-216
- System: Manx Electric Railway
- Owner: Isle Of Man Railways
- Platforms: Ground Level
- Tracks: Two Running Lines

Construction
- Structure type: Waiting Shelter
- Parking: None

History
- Opened: 1899
- Former names: Manx Electric Railway Co.
Location

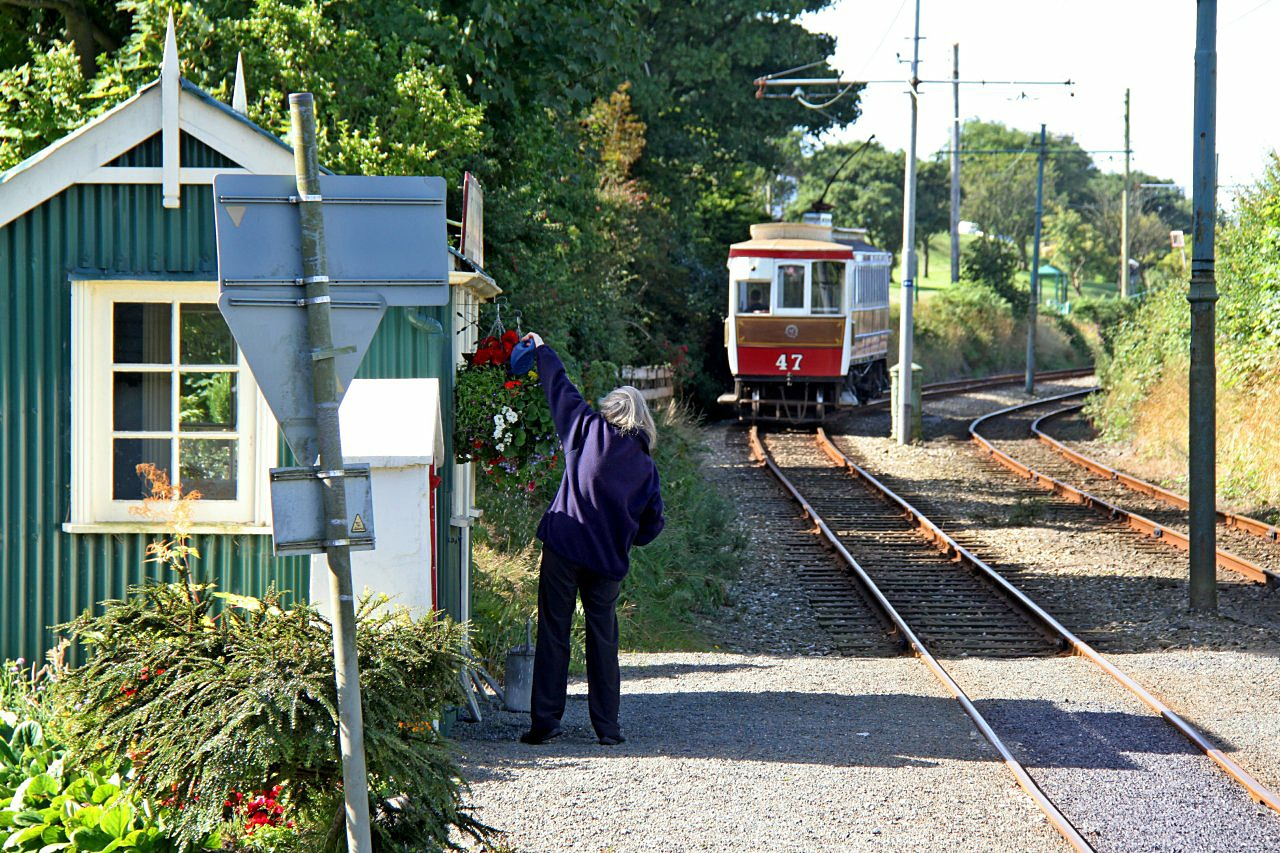
The station

Baldrine Station (Manx: Stashoon Raad Yiarn Valley Drine) is a railway halt in the Isle of Man. It is an intermediate request stop on the east coast route of the Manx Electric Railway in the village of Baldrine in the parish of Lonan, on the route to Ramsey.

== Location ==
This halt can be found between Onchan and Laxey. It lies behind the local chapel and serves the small village of the same name. Nearby is the local Methodist Chapel and meeting room, the tramway passes to the rear of this building.

== Facilities ==
The halt has a small corrugated iron shelter in typical Manx Electric Railway style which is regularly tended by locals who provide flower displays and keep the area smart. The station is on the main coast road between Douglas and Ramsey. To the north side of the station there is also a minor road. The site is a typical rural railway scene, unchanged for many years.

== Sponsorship ==
The station is tended to by a local group from the Women's Institute who look after the general cleanliness of the station and add flower beds and baskets to the station in the summer months.

== Route ==
Preceding station	Manx Electric Railway	Following station
Ballamenagh towards Derby Castle	Douglas–Ramsey	Sunnycott towards Ramsey Station

== Also ==
Manx Electric Railway Stations

== Sources ==
- Manx Electric Railway Stopping Places (2002) Manx Electric Railway Society
- Island Images: Manx Electric Railway Pages (2003) Jon Wornham
- Official Tourist Department Page (2009) Isle Of Man Heritage Railways
