= Scarffe's Crossing =

Railway station in Isle of Man, UK

Scarffe's Crossing Crossag Scarroo
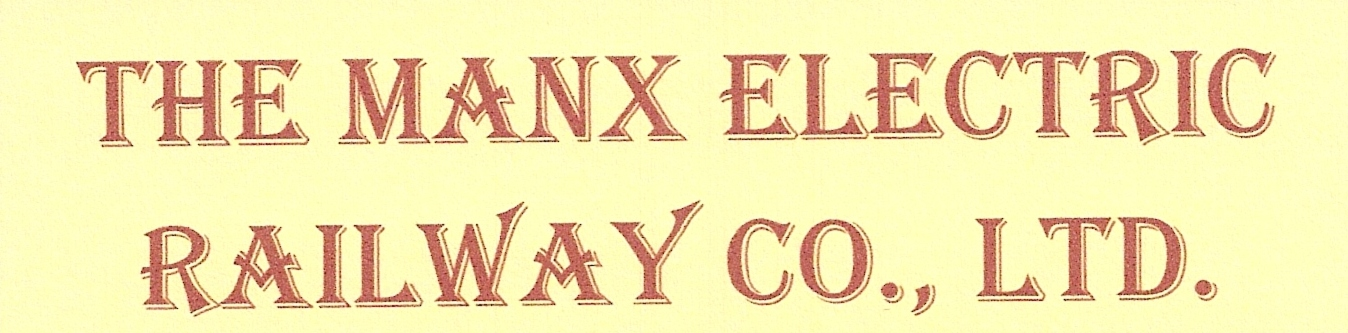

General information
- Location: Lonan, Isle of Man
- Coordinates: 54.196719°N 4.4198101°W
- System: Manx Electric Railway
- Owner: Isle of Man Railways
- Platforms: 2 (Ground Level
- Tracks: 2 (Running Lines)

Construction
- Structure type: None
- Parking: None

History
- Opened: 1894
- Former names: Manx Electric Railway Co.
Location

Scarffe's Crossing (Manx: Crossag Scarroo) is a diminutive and little-used request stop on the Manx Electric Railway on the Isle of Man.

== Location ==
The halt is located off the main Douglas to Laxey road and is positioned on a farm crossing providing resident access only. It is one of many rural request stops along the line still known by their colloquial name (usually named after the farmer who farms nearby.)

== Facilities ==
Until 1999 the stop never had an "official" stop board in place. Despite being unofficially named the halt has a simple bus stop-type sign affixed to the overhead pole.

Preceding station	Manx Electric Railway	Following station
Eskadale towards Derby Castle	Douglas–Ramsey	Ballamenagh towards Ramsey Station

== See also ==
- Manx Electric Railway Stations

== Sources ==
- Manx Manx Electric Railway Stopping Places (2002) Manx Electric Railway Society
- Island Island Images: Manx Electric Railway Pages (2003) Jon Wornham
- Official Official Tourist Department Page (2009) Isle of Man Heritage Railways
