= Preston's Crossing =

Railway station on the Isle of Man

Preston's Crossing Crossag Preston
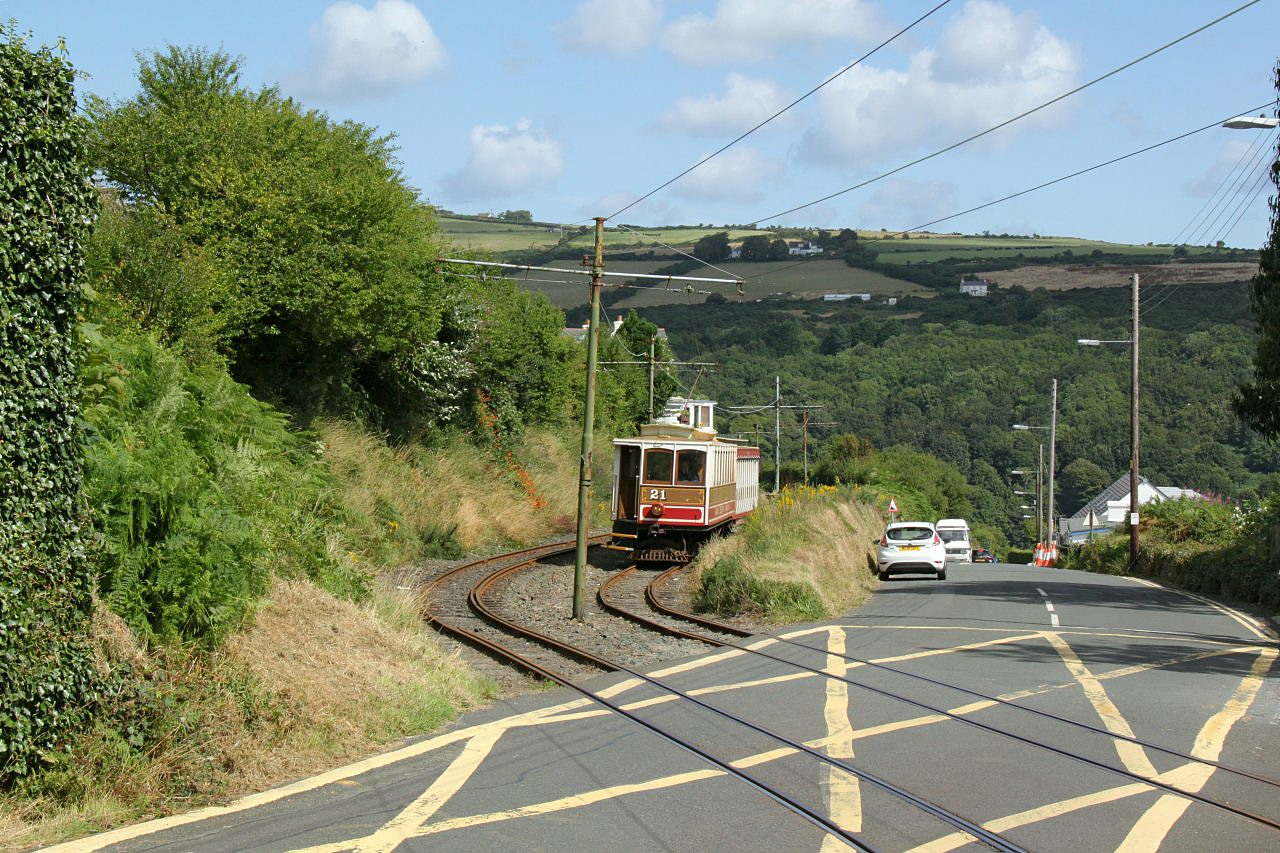
- Tram approaching Preston's Crossing

General information
- Location: Lonan, Isle of Man
- Coordinates: 54°13′21″N 4°23′49″W
- System: Manx Electric Railway
- Owner: Isle Of Man Heritage Railways
- Platforms: Ground Level
- Tracks: Two Running Lines

Construction
- Structure type: None
- Parking: None

History
- Opened: 1894
- Former names: Manx Electric Railway Co., Ltd.
Location

Preston's Crossing (Manx: Crossag Preston) is a diminutive intermediate request stop on the outskirts of Laxey on the Isle of Man, forming part of the Manx Electric Railway route to the northern town of Ramsey.

== Location ==
The line crosses a small "B" road and provides local pick-up and drop-off points for resident passengers. It is not normally used for holiday traffic, as the following station is the main drop-off point connecting to the nearby beach.

== Route ==
Preceding station	Manx Electric Railway	Following station
Fairy Cottage towards Derby Castle	Douglas–Ramsey	South Cape towards Ramsey Station

== See also ==
- Manx Electric Railway stations
