= St Adamnan's Church, Lonan =

Church in Lonan, Isle of Man

Coordinates: 54.1860°N 4.4115°W

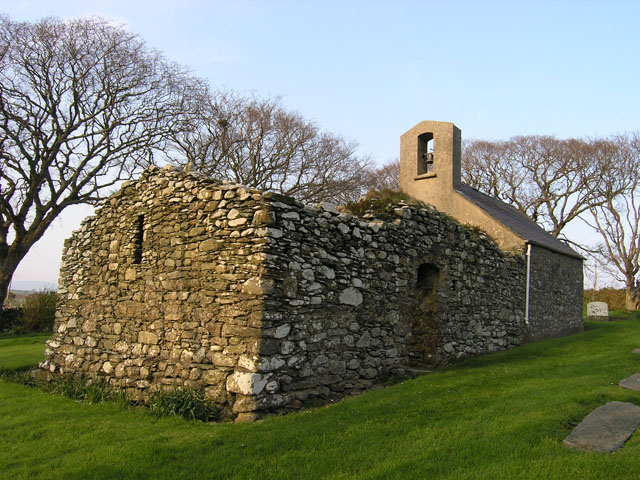
St Adamnan's Church, Lonan

St Adamnan's Church (also known as "Lonan Old Church" and originally known in Manx as Keeill ny-Traie, or "the chapel by the shore") is the former parish church of Lonan in the Isle of Man. The church is situated in an isolated position, surrounded by open farmland on the eastern coast of the island, between Groudle Glen and Baldrine. The eastern (and oldest) part of the church has been restored, but it is otherwise in a ruinous, though well-tended, condition. Adomnán was the Abbot of Iona Abbey between 679 and 704.

== Early history ==
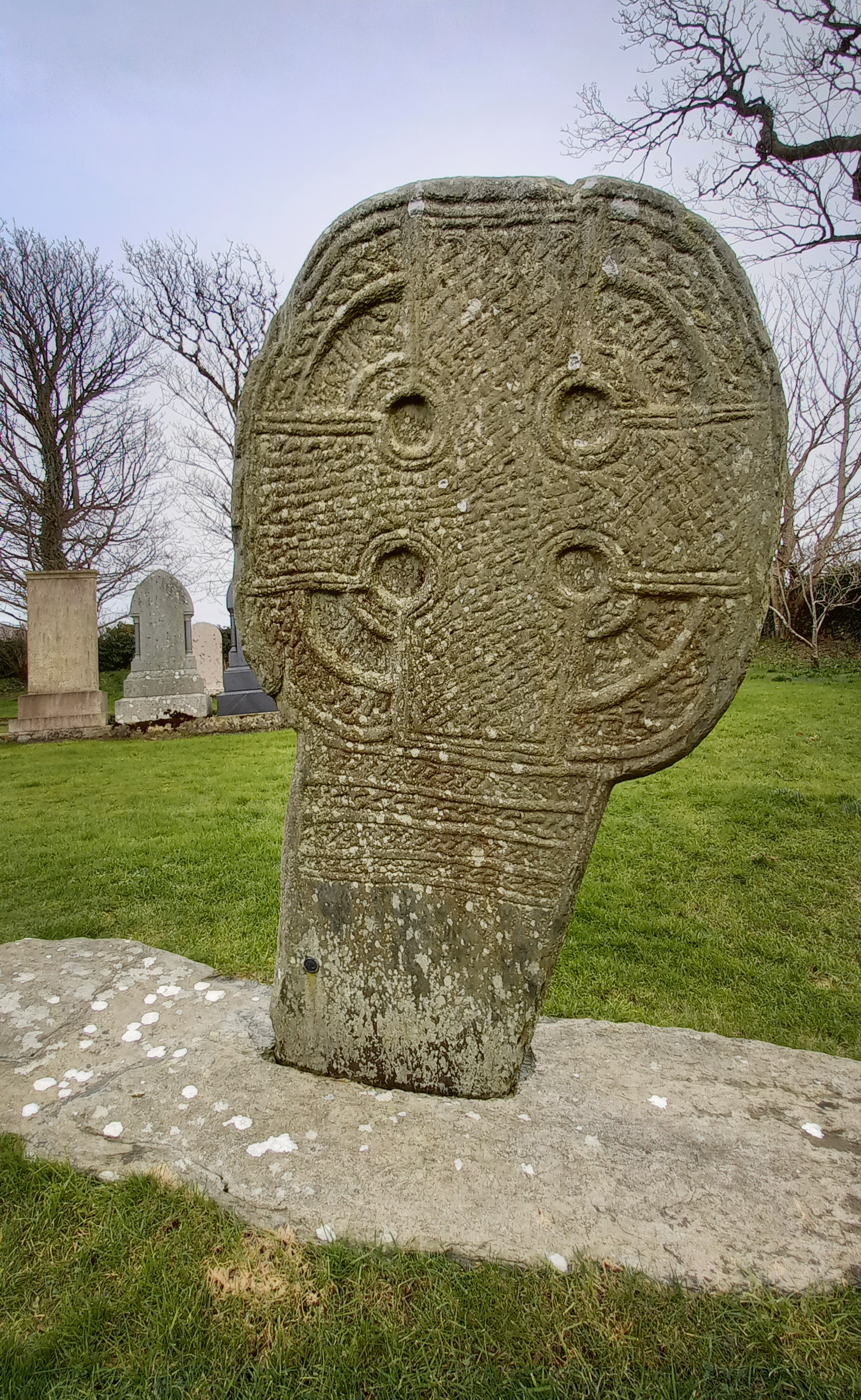
Celtic Cross within the churchyard

The site on which the church stands is of ancient religious significance. The church yard contains Celtic crosses, the oldest of which dates backs to the 5th century AD - evidence of an early keeill. In about 1190, King Reginald of the Isle of Man gave a grant of the land of Escadala, in the Isle of Man to St Bees Priory, in Cumbria. It is likely that the site of the church was included in the grant, to which fact its subsequent reconstruction and selection as the parish church (despite its remoteness) are attributable.

== Supersession ==
On 25 June 1733, an Act of Tynwald was passed for the building of a new parish church at Boilley Veen, in a more convenient part of the parish, but the new church was not in fact completed until a hundred years later. This 19th-century church closed in October 2014 owing to lack of funds for maintenance, leaving Lonan without a parish church.

== Later history ==
St Adamnan's fell into disrepair, but was restored by the Reverend John Quine, who became vicar of Lonan in 1895.

The Friends of St Adamnan's were formed in 1968 to keep the old church in good repair and ensure it remained as a working church and historical site.

It is one of Registered Buildings of the Isle of Man.
