= Ballabeg tram stop =

Railway station in Isle of Man, the UK

Ballabeg Balley Beg
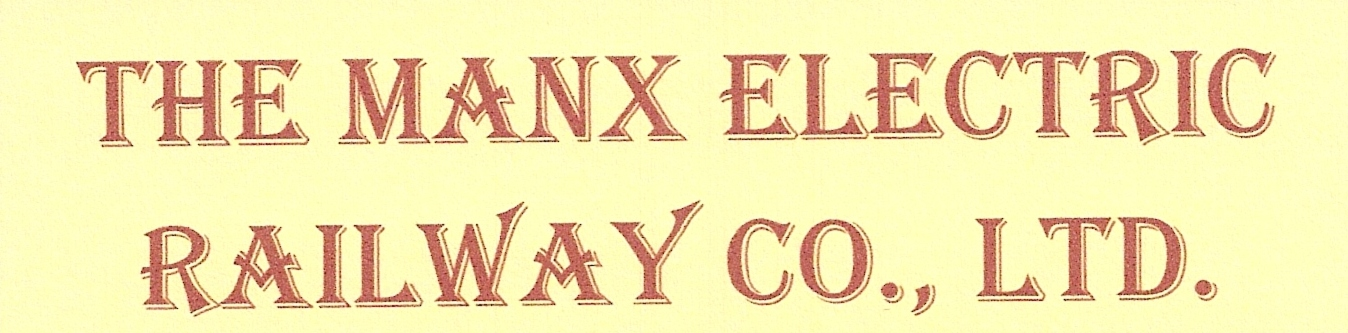

General information
- Location: Lonan, Isle Of Man
- Coordinates: 54°12′48″N 4°24′20″W
- Pole Nos.: 282-283
- System: Manx Electric Railway
- Owner: Isle Of Man Heritage Railways
- Platforms: Ground Level
- Tracks: Two Running Lines

Construction
- Structure type: Waiting Shelter
- Parking: None

History
- Opened: 1894
- Former names: Manx Electric Railway Co., Ltd.
Location

Ballabeg Station (Manx: Stashoon Raad Yiarn Valley Beg) is a rural intermediate request stop on the coastal route of the Manx Electric Railway on the Isle of Man with a small station house constructed in 1905.

== Location ==
The station can be found between Onchan and Laxey on the island's eastern coast. It serves the small hamlet of Ballabeg; it is on the main coast road between Douglas and Ramsey.

== Facilities ==
In 1905 a small hut (the "station house") was built here in typical style from corrugated iron with a pitched roof, and painted in standard green livery. After some years of neglect this was restored by local residents from 2005 to 2008. It largely serves local traffic, being on the outskirts of the residential area of the village.

== Route ==
| Preceding station | Manx Electric Railway | Following station |
|---|---|---|
| Ballagawne towards Derby Castle | Douglas–Ramsey | Lamb's Crossing towards Ramsey Station |

== See also ==
- List of Manx Electric Railway stations

== Sources ==
- Manx Electric Railway Stopping Places (2002) Manx Electric Railway Society
- Island Images: Manx Electric Railway Pages (2003) Jon Wornham
- Official Tourist Department Page (2009) Isle Of Man Heritage Railways
- Ballabeg (2009) Isle of Man Steam Railway Supporters Association
