= Lonan =

Parish on the Isle of Man

Coordinates: 54.212°N 4.406°W

Kirk Lonan: Manx: Skyll Lonan
- Parish of Lonan, Isle of Man
- Population: 1,579
- OS grid reference: SC431822
- Sheading: Garff
- Crown dependency: Isle of Man
- Post town: ISLE OF MAN
- Postcode district: IM4
- House of Keys: Garff

- Parish Church: None (formerly Kirk Lonan Parish Church)
- Industry: Agriculture, Dormitory district
- Main Peaks: Slieau Ree (316 m)
- Main Glens: Laxey Glen and Garwick Glen
- Treens: Rigg, Morest, Shonest, Swarthawe, Brandall, Amogary, Alia Colby, Colby, Hegnes, Greste, Abbeyland, Grawe, Rauffe, Raby, Alia Raby

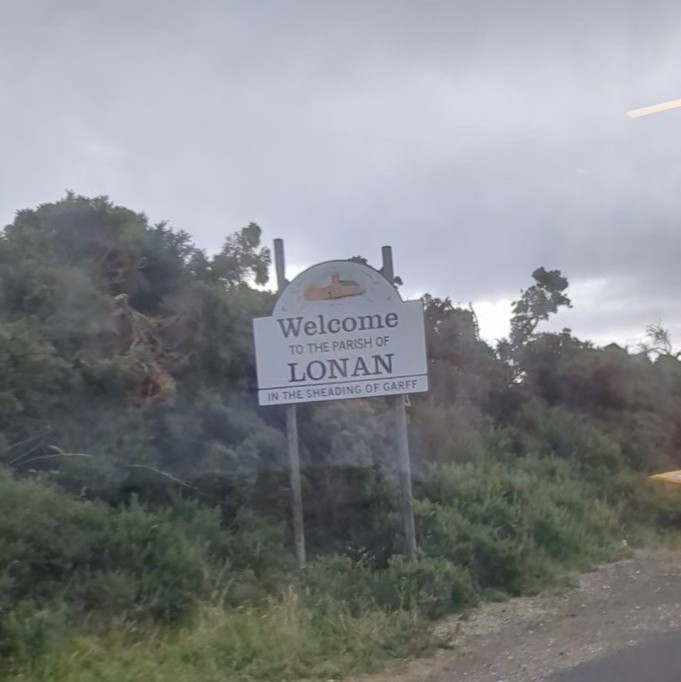

Lonan (/ˈlɒnən/ LONN-ən; Manx: Lonan) is one of the 17 parishes of the Isle of Man.

It is located on the east of the island (part of the traditional South Side division) in the sheading of Garff.

Other settlements in the parish include Baldrine and Ballabeg.

== Local government ==
For the purposes of local government, since May 2016 the historic parish of Lonan has been part of a single Garff local authority, formed by merging the former village district of Laxey with the parish districts of Lonan and Maughold.

Until this amalgamation, the village district of Laxey had been separated from its surrounding parish of Lonan since 1895. Laxey, Lonan and Maughold are still separate wards of the combined district of Garff.

The Captain of the Parish (as of 2019) is Stephen Patrick Carter.

== Politics ==
Lonan parish is part of the Garff constituency, which elects two Members to the House of Keys.

== Geography ==
The parish extends from near Port Groudle in the south to the Snaefell mines and Brandywell Corner (on the TT course to the east of Beinn-y-Phott), a distance of some 6 miles (10 km), and has an area of 15 square miles (39 km^{2}). It is an upland district, being hilly and barren in parts, and dropping sharply into the sea, with the exception of a few small deep, sheltered glens. The highest point in the parish is Mullagh Ouyr (near Snaefell) at 491 metres (1,611 ft). Its coastline is high and rocky, and broken by several headlands and small bays; although there is a stretch of mostly sandy beach from Laxey to Garwick Bay. The main headlands are Laxey Head and Clay Head; and the bays are Bulgham Bay, Laxey Bay, and Garwick Bay. The only significant valleys are Laxey Glen, a popular tourist site extending from the Snaefell mines to the sea, and Glen Roy, which leads into Laxey Glen at Laxey village.

== History ==
Henry Skillicorne, a Bristol sea captain who was later instrumental in developing the spa waters at Cheltenham, was born at Ballaragh in this parish in 1678 or 1679.

According to the Garff Commissioners' road sign, Lonan is the home of the Lonan Gentlemen's Fellowship, "world motor cycle land speed record holders" (at Bonneville Salt Flats).

In 2018 Laxey Bay was designated as a Marine Nature Reserve for its important wildlife and habitats.

== Religion ==
The parish church, All Saints Church, is at Boilley Veen (not marked on small-scale maps, but grid reference 430830). It was built in the 19th century as a more conveniently located substitute for the ancient structure of St Adamnan's Church. This 19th century church closed in October 2014 owing to lack of funds for maintenance, leaving Lonan with no parish church.

== Demographics ==
The Isle of Man census of 2016 returned a parish population of 1,579, an increase of 2.9 per cent from the figure of 1,533 in 2011.
