= Fairy Cottage Halt =

Railway station on the Isle of Man

Fairy Cottage Bwaane ny Ferrishyn
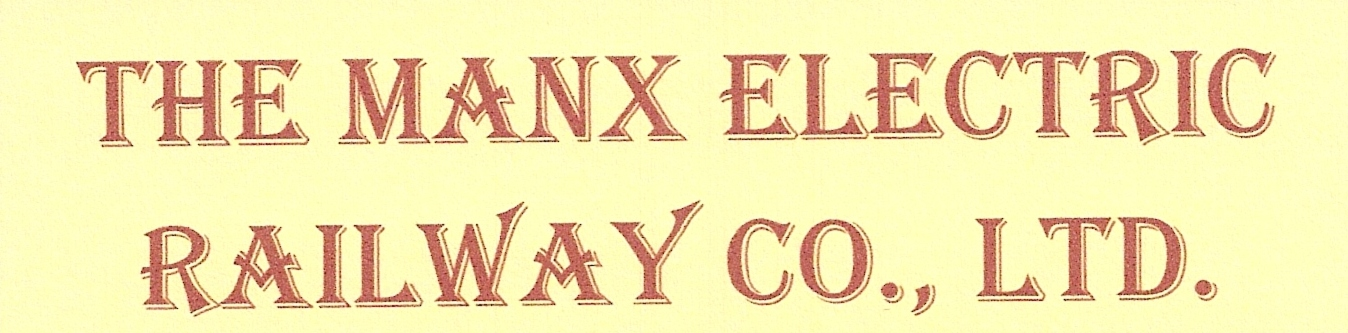

General information
- Location: Lonan, Isle Of Man
- Coordinates: 54°13′16″N 4°23′57″W
- Pole Nos.: 307–208
- System: Manx Electric Railway
- Owner: Isle Of Man Heritage Railways
- Platforms: Ground Level
- Tracks: Two Running Lines

Construction
- Structure type: Waiting Shelter
- Parking: None

History
- Opened: 1894
- Former names: Manx Electric Railway Co., Ltd.
Location

Fairy Cottage Halt (Manx: Stadd Bwaane ny Ferrishyn) is an intermediate stopping place on the Manx Electric Railway on the Isle of Man on the outskirts of the village of Laxey.

== Location ==
The stop is situated on the coast of Laxey Bay. It is only 500 yards from South Cape Halt, and this is the shortest distance between two main stations on the line. Access to the station is gained from the roadside behind a small local filling station and the halt caters almost exclusively for localised traffic.

== Unusual usage ==
In 1998, as part of the year-long Steam 125 event on the island marking the milestone anniversary of the Isle of Man Railway, this tranquil setting served as the terminating point for steam locomotive No. 1 Sutherland of 1873, which operated a number of special workings throughout summer to commemorate the birthday. There was some historical precedent for this, as the railway loaned out locomotives for use in conjunction with the construction of the electric line between 1893 and 1899.

== Facilities ==
Today, the halt sees little traffic but remains complete with its corrugated iron shelter.

== Route ==
| Preceding station | Manx Electric Railway | Following station |
|---|---|---|
| Lamb's Crossing towards Derby Castle | Douglas–Ramsey | Preston's Crossing towards Ramsey Station |

== See also ==
- Manx Electric Railway stations

== Sources ==
- Manx Manx Electric Railway Stopping Places (2002) Manx Electric Railway Society
- Island Island Images: Manx Electric Railway Pages (2003) Jon Wornham
- Official Official Tourist Department Page (2009) Isle Of Man Heritage Railways
