= Miller's Crossing Halt =

Railway station in Isle of Man, UK

Coordinates: 54°13′29″N 4°23′42″W

Miller's Crossing Crossag Miller
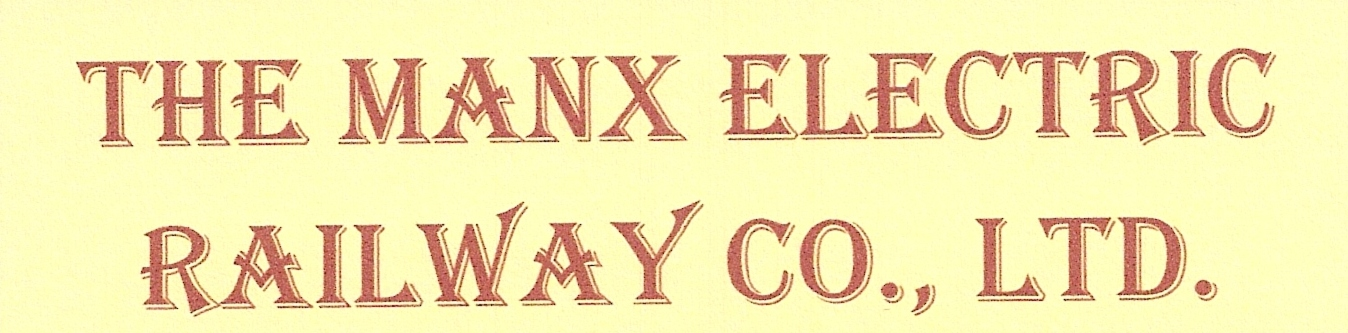

General information
- Location: Pole Nos. 325-326, Laxey, Isle Of Man
- System: Manx Electric Railway
- Owner: Isle Of Man Heritage Railways
- Platforms: Ground Level
- Tracks: Two Running Lines

Construction
- Structure type: None
- Parking: None

History
- Opened: 1894
- Former names: Manx Electric Railway Co., Ltd.
Location

Miller's Crossing (Manx: Crossag Miller) is a small request stop on outskirts of Laxey on the route of the Manx Electric Railway on the Isle of Man.

== Location ==
Like several other unofficial stopping places, it is placed on the intersection of a narrow access road and is mostly used by localised traffic only. The main station for the village is a few minutes tram ride away and the halt as such is not officially named, being known by its colloquial name.

| Preceding station | Manx Electric Railway | Following station |
|---|---|---|
| South Cape towards Derby Castle | Douglas–Ramsey | Car Sheds towards Ramsey Station |

== Also ==
Manx Electric Railway Stations

== Sources ==
- Manx Manx Electric Railway Stopping Places (2002) Manx Electric Railway Society
- Island Island Images: Manx Electric Railway Pages (2003) Jon Wornham
- Official Official Tourist Department Page (2009) Isle Of Man Heritage Railways
