= Eunice Lubega Posnansky =

Eunice Lubega posnansky
- Died: 2003; Los Angeles
- Citizenship: Uganda
- Education: Makerere University Oxford University University of Ghana
- Occupations: Educator, librarian, President of the Uganda Association of University Women and director of Women's Education in 1965
- Years active: 1955–1994
- Spouse: Merrick Posnansky (1931 –2024)

Eunice Lubega Posnansky was the first African woman to graduate from Makerere University, in 1955; she was a pioneer in women's education in Uganda and served as a librarian. She also plays a role in education and library development in Ghana and the United States of America.

== Background and education ==
Eunice Lubega Posnansky was born in Uganda, she was an educator and librarian and the first African woman to receive a degree at Makerere University in 1955, also studied education at Oxford University, in 1967 she took a degree in Library Studies from Ghana.

== Career ==
Eunice was the first African President of the Uganda Association of University Women and in 1965 director of Women's Education.

Eunice taught at Gayaza High School, Lubiri secondary school, she was also an assistant librarian at the University of Ghana, she worked in several California UCLA libraries from 1977 and also taught for the Los Angeles Unified School District until retirement in 1994.

== See also ==
- Rhoda Kalema
- Sarah Ntiro
- Joyce Mpanga
