= Ballamenagh Halt =

Railway station in Isle of Man, the UK

Coordinates: 54.19761°N 4.41751°W

Ballamenagh Balley Meanagh
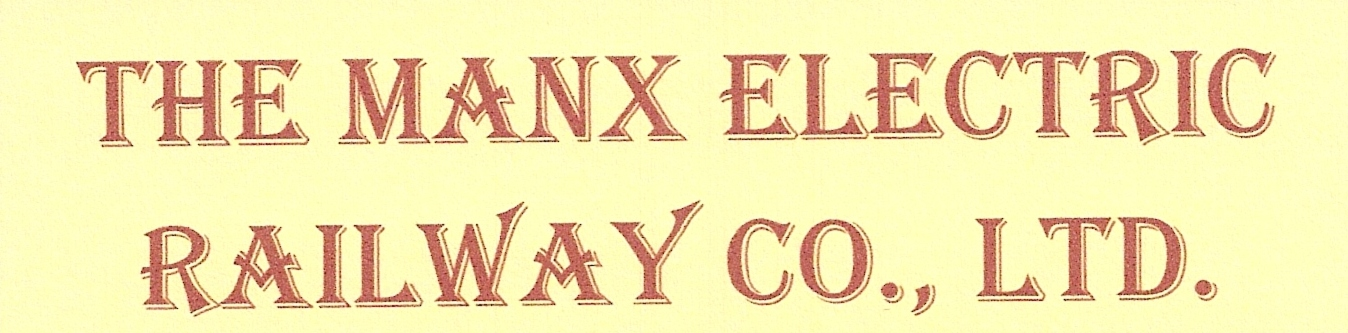

General information
- Location: Pole Nos. 198-199, Lonan, Isle Of Man
- System: Manx Electric Railway
- Owner: Isle Of Man Railways
- Platforms: Ground Level
- Tracks: Two Running Lines

Construction
- Structure type: Bus Shelter
- Parking: None

History
- Opened: 1894
- Former names: Manx Electric Railway Co.
Location

Ballamenagh Halt (Manx: Stadd Valley Meanagh) is a request stop on the Manx Electric Railway on the Isle of Man.

== Location ==
The halt is located at the side of the main Douglas to Laxey road which runs parallel along this particular section of the tramway. Nearby is a local housing estate which the stop serves.

== Facilities ==
This stop doubles up as a bus stop in connection with the island's Bus Vannin services which are operated by the same government department as the tramway. Despite being a little-used rural halt, it was equipped with a modern bus shelter in 2000 with the dual purpose of providing shelter to bus customers also; it is in close proximity to the next official station on the line and sees little use for this reason.

Preceding station	Manx Electric Railway	Following station
Scarffe's Crossing towards Derby Castle	Douglas–Ramsey	Baldrine towards Ramsey Station

== Also ==
Manx Electric Railway Stations

== Sources ==
- Manx Manx Electric Railway Stopping Places (2002) Manx Electric Railway Society
- Island Island Images: Manx Electric Railway Pages (2003) Jon Wornham
- Official Tourist Department Page (2009) Isle Of Man Heritage Railways
