= Henry Hurd Swinnerton =

British geologist

Henry Hurd Swinnerton (1875–1966) was a British geologist. He was professor of geology at University College Nottingham from 1910 to 1946.

Swinnerton was educated at the Royal College of Science, and earned a doctorate in zoology (D.Sc.) from the University of London in July 1902.

In the 1930s Swinnerton was a member of the Fenland Research Committee, contributing valuable knowledge of the geomorphology of the Lincolnshire coast. In 1937 he served as President of the Lincolnshire Naturalists' Union; he gave his presidential address on "The Problem of the Lincoln Gap". In 1942 he was awarded the Murchison Medal of the Geological Society of London.

== See also ==
- Merrick Posnansky

== Selected bibliography ==
- Swinnerton H.H. (1910) Nottinghamshire, Cambridge County Geographies.
- Swinnerton H.H. (1912) The palmistry of the rocks. Rep Trans Notts Nat Soc; 60: 65–68.
- Swinnerton H.H.; Trueman, A.E. (1917). The Morphology and Development of the Ammonite Septum. Quarterly Journal of the Geological Society, London 73, 26–58
- Swinnerton H.H. (1923) Outlines of Palaeontology. Third edition. London, Edward Arnold, 1958.
- Swinnerton H.H. (1935) The Rocks Below the Red Chalk of Lincolnshire, and Their Cephalopod Faunas. Quarterly Journal of the Geological Society, London 91, 1–46.
- Swinnerton H.H. (1937). A monograph of British Lower Cretaceous belemnites. Part 2. Monograph of the Palaeontological Society, 90 (for 1936): xvii-xxxii + 17–30.
- Swinnerton H.H. (1938). Presidential Address. The Problem of the Lincoln Gap. Transactions of the Lincolnshire Naturalists' Union 9, 145–153.
- Swinnerton H.H. (1941). Further observations on the Lower Cretaceous rocks of Lincolnshire. Proceedings of the Geologists’ Association 52, 198–207.
- Swinnerton H.H. (1943) Belemnites from East Greenland. Ann. Mag. Nat. Hist. Ser. II 10 (66), 406–410.
- Swinnerton H.H. (1936–1955) A Monograph of British Cretaceous Belemnites. Lower Cretaceous. Palaeontographical Society, London 1–5, 1–86.
- Swinnerton H.H. & Kent P.E. (1949) The Geology of Lincolnshire (Lincolnshire Natural History Brochure No. 1.) Lincoln, Lincolnshire Naturalists' Union 1949 (2nd Ed, 1981).
- Swinnerton H.H. (1958) The Earth Beneath Us Harmondsworth: Pelican .
- Swinnerton H.H. (1960) Fossils (New Naturalist Series). London: Collins.
