= Ballagawne Halt =

Railway station in Isle of Man, the UK

Coordinates: 54.207389°N 4.407003°W

Ballagawne Balley Gawne
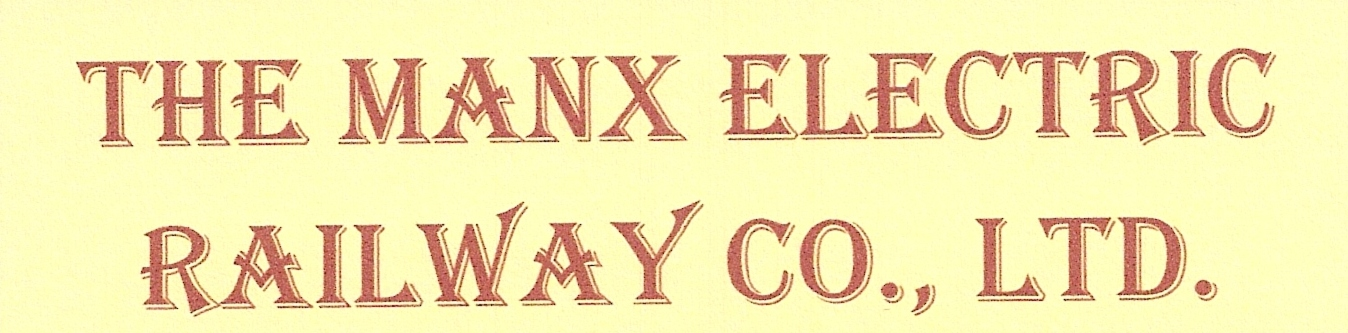

General information
- Location: Pole Nos. 256-257, Lonan, Isle Of Man
- System: Manx Electric Railway
- Owner: Isle Of Man Heritage Railways
- Platforms: 2 (Ground Level
- Tracks: 2 (Running Lines)

Construction
- Structure type: None
- Parking: None

History
- Opened: 1894
- Former names: Manx Electric Railway Co., Ltd.
Location

Ballagawne Halt (Manx: Stadd Valley Gawne) is a rural request stop on the Manx Electric Railway on the Isle of Man.

== Location ==
Like several other halts on the line that run parallel with a main road between Douglas and Laxey on the coastal section above the nearby glen at Garwick.

== Facilities ==
Located quite remotely, this station sees little use.

In recent years it has been equipped with a dual-purpose shelter, providing a waiting area for Bus Vannin customers, as well as tramway passengers.

Preceding station	Manx Electric Railway	Following station
Garwick Glen towards Derby Castle	Douglas–Ramsey	Ballabeg towards Ramsey Station

== See also ==
Manx Electric Railway Stations

== Sources ==
- Manx Manx Electric Railway Stopping Places (2002) Manx Electric Railway Society
- Island Island Images: Manx Electric Railway Pages (2003) Jon Wornham
- Official Tourist Department Page (2009) Isle Of Man Heritage Railways
