= Cambridge County Geographies =

Cambridge County Geographies is a book series published by Cambridge University Press.

== Volumes ==
- Aberdeenshire by Mackie, Alexander
- Argyllshire and Buteshire by MacNair, Peter (wikisource)
- Ayrshire by Foster, John
- Banffshire by Barclay, W.
- Bedfordshire by Chambers, C. Gore
- Berkshire by Monckton, H. W. (wikisource)
- Berwickshire and Roxburghshire by Crockett, W. S. (wikisource)
- Breconshire by Evans, Christopher J. (wikisource)
- Buckinghamshire by Morley Davies, A.
- Caithness and Sutherland by Campbell, H. F.
- Cambridgeshire by McKenny Hughes, T.
- Carnarvonshire by Lloyd, J. E.
- Cheshire by Coward, T. A.
- Clackmannan and Kinross by Day, J. P.
- Cornwall by Baring-Gould, S.
- Cumberland by Marr, J. E.
- Derbyshire by Arnold-Bemrose, H. H. (wikisource)
- Devonshire by Knight, Francis A. and Knight Dutton, Louie M.
- Dorset by Salmon, Arthur L.
- Dunbartonshire by Mort, F. (wikisource)
- Dumfriesshire by Hewison, James K.
- Durham by Weston, W. J.
- East London by Bosworth, G. F.
- East Lothian by Muir, T. S.
- East Riding of Yorkshire by Hobson, Bernard
- Essex by Bosworth, George F.
- Fifeshire by Valentine, Easton S. (wikisource)
- Flintshire by Edwards, J. M.
- Forfarshire by Valentine, Easton S.
- Glamorganshire by Wade, J. H.
- Gloucestershire by Evans, Herbert A.
- Hampshire by Varley, Telford (wikisource)
- Herefordshire by Bradley, A. G.
- Hertfordshire by Lydekker, R.
- Huntingdonshire by Noble, W. M.
- Isle of Man by Quine, John
- Isle of Wight by Varley, Telford
- Kent by Bosworth, George F.
- Kincardineshire by Kinnear, George H.
- Kirkcudbrightshire and Wigtownshire by Learmonth, William
- Lanarkshire by Mort, Frederick
- Leicestershire by Pingriff, G. N.
- Lincolnshire by Mansel Sympson, E.
- Linlithgowshire by Muir, T. S.
- Merionethshire by Morris, A.
- Middlesex by Bosworth, G. F.
- Midlothian by McCallum, Alex
- Monmouthshire by Evans, Herbert A.
- Moray and Nairn by Matheson, Charles
- Norfolk by Dutt, W. A.
- Northamptonshire by Brown, M. W.
- North Lancashire by Marr, J. E.
- North Riding of Yorkshire by Weston, W. J.
- Northumberland by Rennie Haselhurst, S.
- Nottinghamshire by Swinnerton, H. H.
- Orkney and Shetland by Moodie Heddle, J. G. F. and Mainland, T.
- Oxfordshire by Ditchfield, P. H.
- Peebles and Selkirk by Pringle, George C. (wikisource)
- Perthshire by MacNair, Peter
- Radnorshire by Davies, Lewis
- Renfrewshire by Mort, Frederick
- Ross and Cromarty by Watson, William J.
- Rutland by Phillips, G.
- Somerset by Knight, Francis A.
- South Lancashire by Wilmore, A.
- Staffordshire by Smith, W. Bernard (wikisource)
- Stirlingshire by Simpson, W. Douglas
- Suffolk by Dutt, W. A.
- Surrey by Bosworth, George F.
- Sussex by Bosworth, George F.
- Warwickshire by Bloom, J. Harvey
- West London by Bosworth, G. F.
- Westmorland by Marr, J. E.
- West Riding of Yorkshire by Hobson, Bernard
- Wiltshire by Bradley, A. G.
- Worcestershire by Wills, Leonard J.

== See also ==
- Victoria County History
