= South Cape Halt =

Railway station in Isle of Man, the UK

South Cape Rheynn Yiass
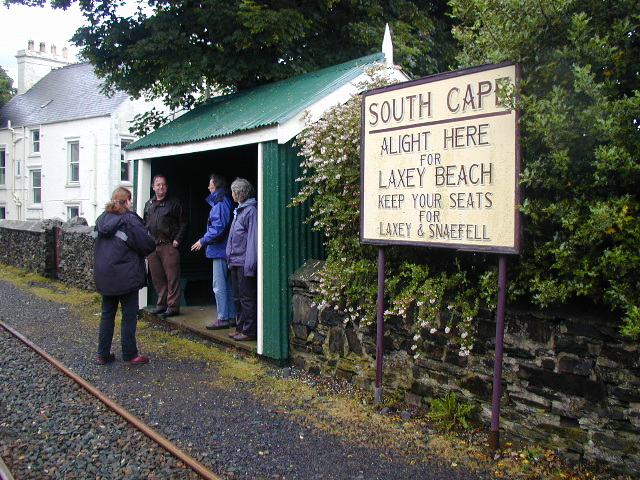

General information
- Location: Laxey, Isle Of Man
- Coordinates: 54°13′29″N 4°23′42″W
- Pole Nos.: 320-321
- System: Manx Electric Railway
- Owner: Isle Of Man Railways
- Platforms: Ground level
- Tracks: Two running lines

Construction
- Structure type: Waiting shelter
- Parking: None

History
- Opened: 1894
- Former names: Manx Electric Railway Co.
Location

South Cape Halt (Manx: Stadd Rheynn Yiass) is an intermediate stopping place on the easterly section of the Manx Electric Railway on the Isle of Man.

== Location ==
The halt is located on the outskirts of Laxey and it serves the area of the village known as Old Laxey and lies above the beach. It acts as a useful drop-off point for visitors wishing to access the beach rather than the village itself.

== Facilities ==
The station is notable for its substantial corrugated iron shelter with perimeter seating and a sign is displayed outside advising passengers to alight here for the beach, and keep their seats for the village, the Snaefell Mountain Railway and Ramsey.

== Route ==
Preceding station	Manx Electric Railway	Following station
Preston's Crossing towards Derby Castle	Douglas–Ramsey	Miller's Crossing towards Ramsey Station

== Also ==
Manx Electric Railway Stations

== Sources ==
- Manx Electric Railway Stopping Places (2002) Manx Electric Railway Society
- Island Images: Manx Electric Railway Pages (2003) Jon Wornham
- Official Tourist Department Page (2009) Isle Of Man Heritage Railways
