= Garwick Glen Halt =

Railway station in Isle of Man, the UK

Garwick Glen Glion Garwick
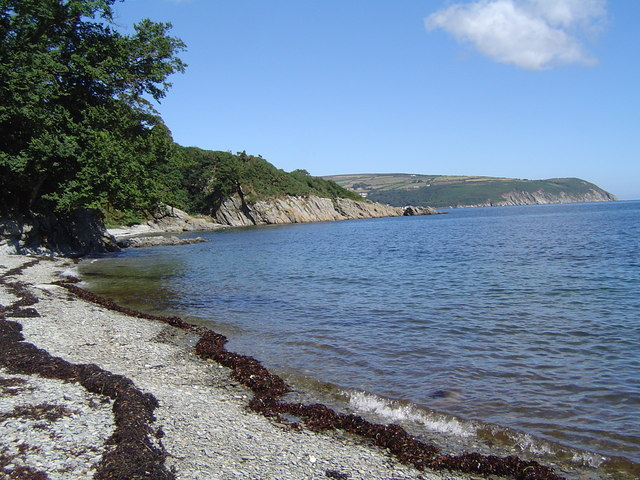

General information
- Location: Lonan, Isle Of Man
- Coordinates: 54.2070369°N 4.4103224°W
- Pole Nos.: 243-244
- System: Manx Electric Railway
- Owner: Isle Of Man Railways
- Platforms: Ground level
- Tracks: 2 (Running Line and Crossover)

Construction
- Structure type: Demolished
- Parking: None

History
- Opened: 1894
- Closed: 1965
- Former names: Manx Electric Railway Co.
Location

Garwick Glen Halt (Manx: Stadd Ghlion Garwick) is a rural intermediate request stop on the east coast route of the Manx Electric Railway on the Isle of Man.

== Location ==
The station lies between Douglas and Laxey and is situated in a small valley of the same name which opens into Garwick Bay. The place name derives from the Manx Gaelic meaning "pleasant bay", derived from an old Celtic word.

== History ==
The station was once one of the busiest on the railway, being home to sprawling pleasure gardens of the same name that operated successfully until the close of the 1965 summer season, when the station became privately owned. The station once had its own station master and covered waiting shelter for passengers as well as a rustic souvenir stand similar to those found at Laxey Station. The glen, with its topiaries and well-kept gardens, led down to a beach, where shoreline caves were marketed in contemporary literature for the station. At the turn of the 20th century, the area was marketed as featuring "smugglers' cove", "hermit's archway" and many other romantic names, and the site was dominated by a hotel of the same name (now a private dwelling and unavailable for public viewing). There is also a large lake in the grounds, which are home to the island's only maze.

== Decline ==
Despite closure, the station remained open but was seldom used, and the structures were not demolished until 1978, when the site was cleared. There remains in situ a crossover set of points to facilitate short workings to and from Derby Castle, but this has been unused for years. From the passing tram, a solitary overgrown section of brick wall is the only reminder of this once-busy station. The glen and its grounds were once open to the public on special days, but this practice ended.

== Route ==
Preceding station	Manx Electric Railway	Following station
Sunnycott towards Derby Castle	Douglas–Ramsey	Ballagawne towards Ramsey Station

== See also ==
- Manx Electric Railway Stations

== Sources ==
- Manx Manx Electric Railway Stopping Places (2002) Manx Electric Railway Society
- Island Island Images: Manx Electric Railway Pages (2003) Jon Wornham
- Official Official Tourist Department Page (2009) Isle Of Man Heritage Railways
