= Lamb's Crossing =

Railway station in Isle of Man, the UK

Lamb's Crossing Crossag Eayn
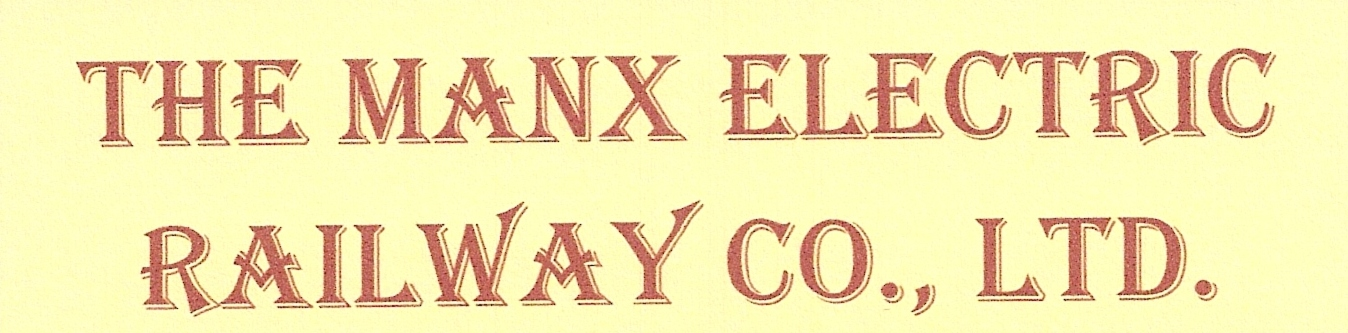

General information
- Location: Lonan, Isle Of Man
- Coordinates: 54.197092°N 4.418702°W
- Pole Nos.: 304-305
- System: Manx Electric Railway
- Owner: Isle Of Man Heritage Railways
- Platforms: Ground Level
- Tracks: Two Running Lines

Construction
- Structure type: None
- Parking: None

History
- Opened: 1894
- Former names: Manx Electric Railway Co., Ltd.
Location

Lamb's Crossing (Manx: Crossag Eayn) is a stop on the Manx Electric Railway on the Isle of Man.

== Location ==
The diminutive halt can be found on the descent from Garwick into the village of Laxey, and serves a residential community in the upper part of the valley.

== Facilities ==
Being a little-used rural request stop, this halt has no passenger facilities but is marked by a traction pole-mounted totem sign.

Preceding station	Manx Electric Railway	Following station
Ballabeg towards Derby Castle	Douglas–Ramsey	Fairy Cottage towards Ramsey Station

== Also ==
Manx Electric Railway Stations

== Sources ==
- Manx Manx Electric Railway Stopping Places (2002) Manx Electric Railway Society
- Island Island Images: Manx Electric Railway Pages (2003) Jon Wornham
- Official Official Tourist Department Page (2009) Isle Of Man Heritage Railways
