= Billy Redmayne =

Manx soldier and motorcycle racer

Billy Redmayne with the Junior Manx Grand Prix trophy at a dinner at the Palace Hotel in Douglas, January 2016

Billy Redmayne (6 February 1991 – 19 April 2016) was a Manx soldier and motorcycle racer.

A native of Laxey, Redmayne served in the Parachute Regiment and completed three tours in Afghanistan. He won the Newcomers Manx Grand Prix in 2014 and the Junior Manx Grand Prix a year later.

On 17 April 2016, Redmayne was involved in an accident at the Oliver's Mount Spring Cup in Scarborough, North Yorkshire. He was taken by ambulance to Scarborough hospital then airlifted to James Cook University Hospital in Middlesbrough. He died aged 25, with his family around him and on his second anniversary with partner Hannah Wright, who said that he had died doing what he loved. His brain injuries were too severe for him to recover, and his partner and family made a decision for his life support to be switched off and his organs donated.

Redmayne was due to debut at the Isle of Man TT in the summer of 2016.
