= King Orry's Grave =

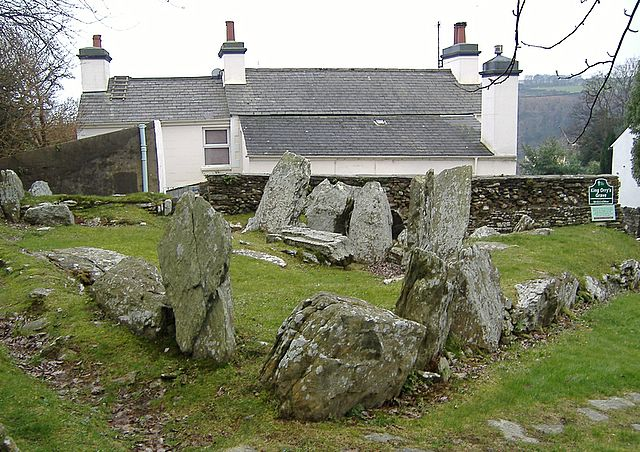
- King Orry's Grave seen from the north

- Isle of Man with location of King Orry's Grave
- Interactive map of King Orry's Grave
- 54.231413°N 4.396447°W
- Type: Chambered cairn
- Periods: Neolithic
- Location: Isle of Man
- OS grid reference: SC 43894 84396

Site notes
- Elevation: 79 m (259 ft)
- Excavation dates: 1930
- Owner: Manx National Heritage
- Public access: Yes

King Orry's Grave is the largest megalithic tomb on the Isle of Man. It is situated in Minorca, in the northern part of the village of Laxey, partly in a private cottage garden. It is some 4000 to 5000 years old; however the reference to King Orry is to the 11th century local ruler Godred Crovan, who has a number of supposed burial places. The modern name likely dates to the early 19th century.

King Orry's Grave is a Manx National Heritage site.

== Description ==
The Neolithic tomb comprises two separate chambered sections. Like Cashtal yn Ard, the structure is a multi-chambered Clyde cairn of coloured sandstone.

The north-eastern facing eastern part of the tomb is semi-circular with a diameter of 12 m and a depth of 4 m. The eastern section is a row of three burial chambers covered by a trapezoidal-shaped cairn. A U-shaped forecourt and slab façade are linked by dry stone walls and two portal stones. The chamber may have been larger, but was destroyed in the 19th century during the construction of a road and a house.

At the western end there is a separate cist-like structure, excavated in 1930, with a menhir. As the central section is not extant, it is unclear whether this is part of the same structure as the construction of modern housing has made excavation difficult. The massive stone slabs that make up the chambers were of local stone. A second chamber was later built and at the south-west end, a horseshoe shaped forecourt was added. Only stumps of the original standing stones survive, except for one remaining tall stone. These standing stones likely formed part of a cairn of rubble that covered the burial chambers, similar to those found in the north of Ireland and south-west Scotland.
