= Merrick Posnansky =

British archaeologist (1931–2024)

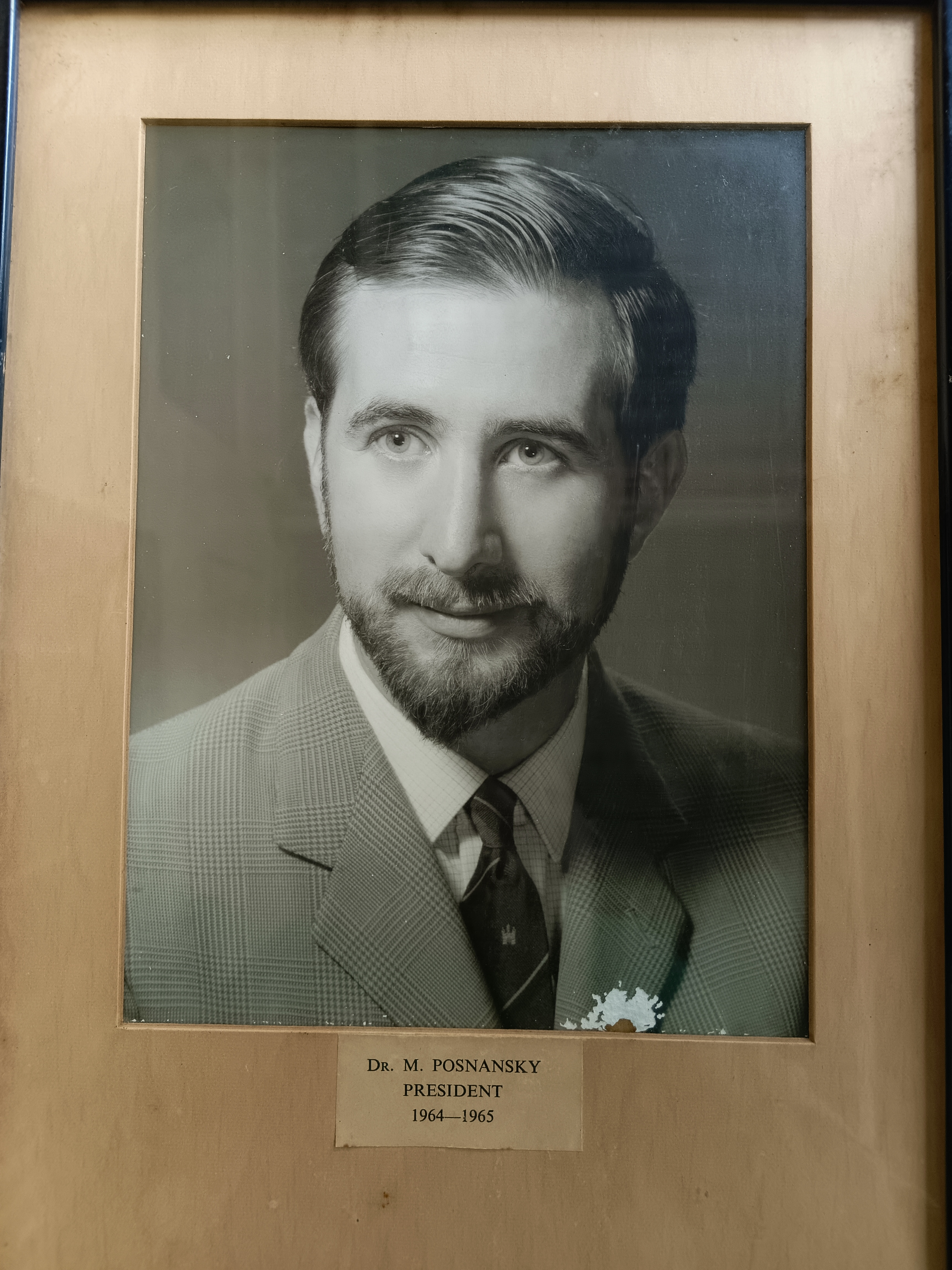
- Born: 8 March 1931
- Died: 29 September 2024 (aged 93)
- Education: University of Nottingham
- Occupation: Historical archaeologist
- Title: President of the Uganda Society
- Term: 1964–1965
- Predecessor: B.E.R Kirwan
- Successor: Dr W.B Banage
- Spouse: Eunice Nalubega

Merrick Posnansky (8 March 1931 – 29 September 2024) was a British archaeologist. He worked as a curator for the Uganda Museum and also served as the 31st president of the Uganda Society between 1964 and 1965

== Education ==
Posnansky completed a Bachelor of Arts in History and Geography at the University of Nottingham in 1952 and later a diploma in Prehistoric Archaeology at Peterhouse, University of Cambridge in 1953.

Under the supervision of Henry Hurd Swinnerton, he obtained his PhD in Archaeology from the University of Nottingham in 1956. According to his profile in the Historical ArchaeologyJournal, his research dealt with "the Pleistocene chronology and prehistoric archaeology of the English East Midlands while his dissertation covered some of the archaeology of more recent periods".

== Career ==
=== Kenya ===
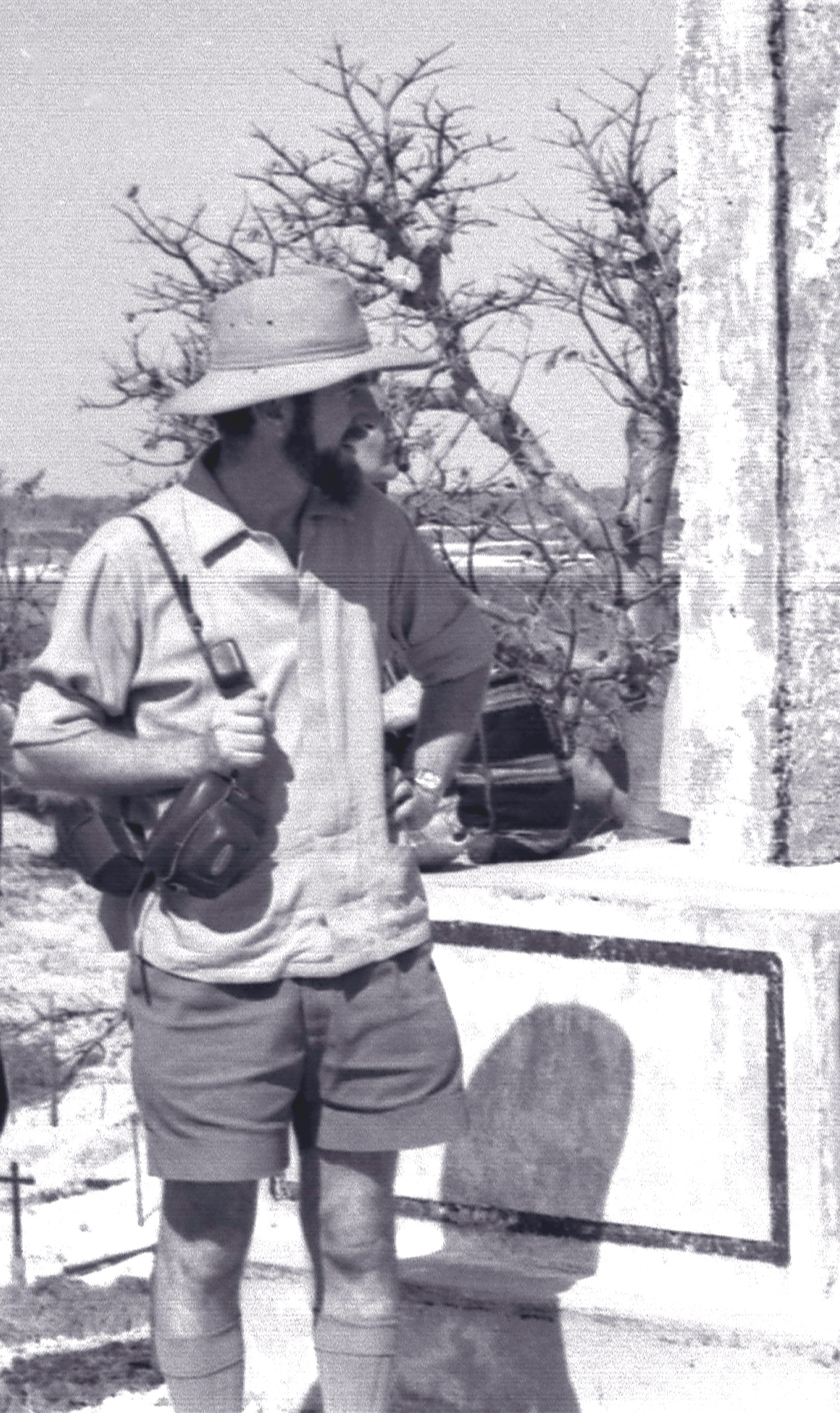
Dr. Merrick Posnansky at the Fadiouth shell-island cemetery, Sénégal (West Africa) 1967

Upon the suggestion of Grahame Clark, Posnansky first travelled to Africa in 1956 to work for the Royal National Parks of Kenya as the Warden of Prehistoric Sites. During this time, he excavated at the archaeological sites of Olorgesailie and Lanet while also conducting research

=== Uganda ===
In 1958, Posnansky worked as curator at the Uganda Museum. He held that position for four years. He worked as a Director of the African Studies Program at Makerere University College, Uganda.

Upon his retirement in 1994, he returned to Uganda to conduct research and dug at Egyptian fort at Dufile

=== Ghana ===
In 1967, Merrick moved to Ghana as a professor and chair of the Archaeology Department at the University of Ghana, Legon.

He was Director of the Institute of Archaeology and the James S. Coleman African Studies Centre.

== Awards ==
- 2003: J.C Harrington Medal in Historical Archaeology

== Publications ==
Selected Articles

- Posnansky, Merrick. (2010). "Aspects of Early West African Trade". World Archaeology. Volume 5, 1973, Issue 2: Trade. https://doi.org/10.1080/00438243.1973.9979562
- Posnansky, Merrick. (2010). "African archaeology comes of age." World Archaeology. Volume 13, 1982, Issue 3: Regional traditions of archaeological research II. https://doi.org/10.1080/00438243.1982.9979838
- Posnansky, Merrick. (2009). "Pottery Types from Archaeological sites in East Africa." The Journal of African History. Volume 2, Issue 2, July 1961, pp.177–98. https://doi.org/10.1017/S0021853700002401
- Posnansky, Merrick., & McIntosh, Roderick. (2009). "New Radiocarbon Dated for Northern and Western Africa". The Journal of African History. Volume 17, Issue 2, April 1976, pp.161–195. https://doi.org/10.1017/S0021853700001286
