= Arthur Granville Bradley =

British historian

Arthur Granville Bradley (11 November 1850, Rugby, Warwickshire – 11 January 1943) was a British historian and an author of numerous books. His father was George Granville Bradley, Dean of Westminster.

== Biography ==
A. G. Bradley was educated at Marlborough College and Trinity College, Cambridge. He spent several years farming in Virginia. Upon his return to England, he became a colonial agent in Westminster. From 1897 to 1926 he was a prolific author of books. In 1874 he married a surgeon's daughter Florence Rackham; they had one daughter.

== Works ==
- Wolfe. 1895.
- Sketches from Old Virginia. 1897.
- Highways and Byways in North Wales. 1898.
- The Fight with France for North America. A. Constable and co. 1900.
- Highways and Byways in the Lake District. 1901.
- Owen Glyndwr and the Last Struggle for Welsh Independence. Heroes of the nationsv. 33. Putnam. 1901.
- Highways and Byways in South Wales. 1903.
- Canada in the Twentieth Century. 1903.
- "Chapter IV. The Conquest of Canada (1744–1761)". The Cambridge Modern History, vol. 7. 1903.
- Life of Guy Carleton, Lord Dorchester. 1905.
- Captain John Smith. 1906.
- In the March and Borderland of Wales. Houghton. 1906.
- Round about Wiltshire. 1907.
- Lord Dorchester. 1907.
- The Making of Canada. 1908.
- The Rivers and Streams of England. Adam and Charles Black 1909.
- The Romance of Northumberland. A. C. McClure. 1909.
- Wiltshire. Cambridge County Geographies. 1909.
- The Avon and Shakespeare's Country. 1910.
- Britain across the Seas, America. 1911.
- The Gateway of Scotland. 1912.
- Herefordshire. Cambridge County Geographies. 1913.
- Other Days, Recollections of Rural England and Old Virginia, 1860–1880. Constable and company. 1913.
- Clear Waters. Houghton Mifflin company. 1914.
- An Old Gate of England. 1918.
- A Book of the Severn. 1920.
- In Praise of North Wales. Houghton, Mifflin. 1925.
- Exmoor Memories. 1926.
