= Sunnycott Halt =

Railway station in Isle of Man, the UK

Sunnycott Sunnycott
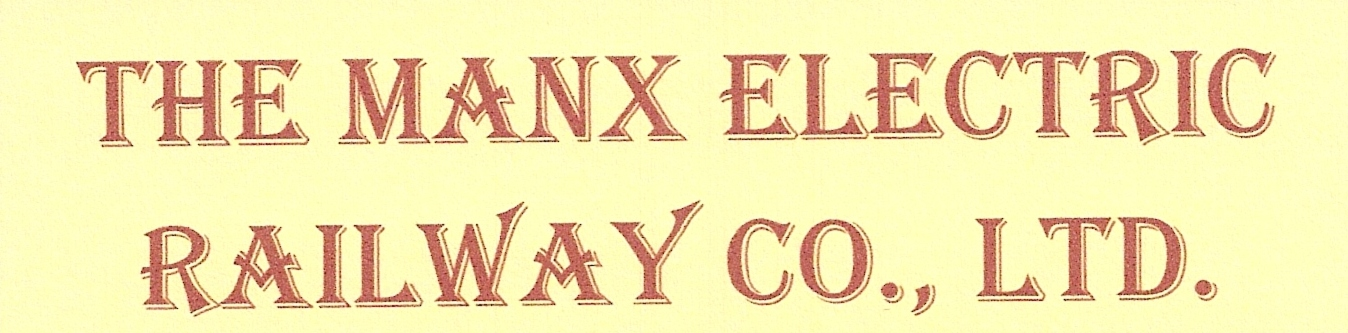

General information
- Location: Lonan, Isle Of Man
- Coordinates: 54.203479°N 4.41229°W
- Pole Nos.: 220-221
- System: Manx Electric Railway
- Owner: Isle Of Man Railways
- Platforms: Ground Level
- Tracks: Two Running Lines

Construction
- Structure type: None
- Parking: None

History
- Opened: 1894
- Former names: Manx Electric Railway Co.
Location

Sunnycott Halt (Manx: Stadd Sunnycott) is a wayside request stop on the Manx Electric Railway on the Isle of Man.

== Location ==
The halt is situated on a small "B" road, Packhorse Lane, gaining its name from that of a nearby private dwelling. As part of the nature of the line, it has in the past been a stopping place for local travellers because the inter-urban line runs with no platformed-stations they can stop anywhere within reason. This area, over a period of time became established as a regular stopping place.

Preceding station	Manx Electric Railway	Following station
Baldrine towards Derby Castle	Douglas–Ramsey	Garwick Glen towards Ramsey Station

== Also ==
Manx Electric Railway Stations

== Sources ==
- Manx Manx Electric Railway Stopping Places (2002) Manx Electric Railway Society
- Island Island Images: Manx Electric Railway Pages (2003) Jon Wornham
- Official Official Tourist Department Page (2009) Isle Of Man Heritage Railways
