= Laxey Bay =

Bay in the Isle of Man

Laxey Bay (Manx: Baie Laksaa) is a coastal feature and Marine Nature Reserve on the east coast of the Isle of Man in the north Irish Sea. Geographically it is bounded by Laxey Head (Manx: Kione Laksaa) to the north and Clay Head (Manx: Kione ny Cleigh) to the south.

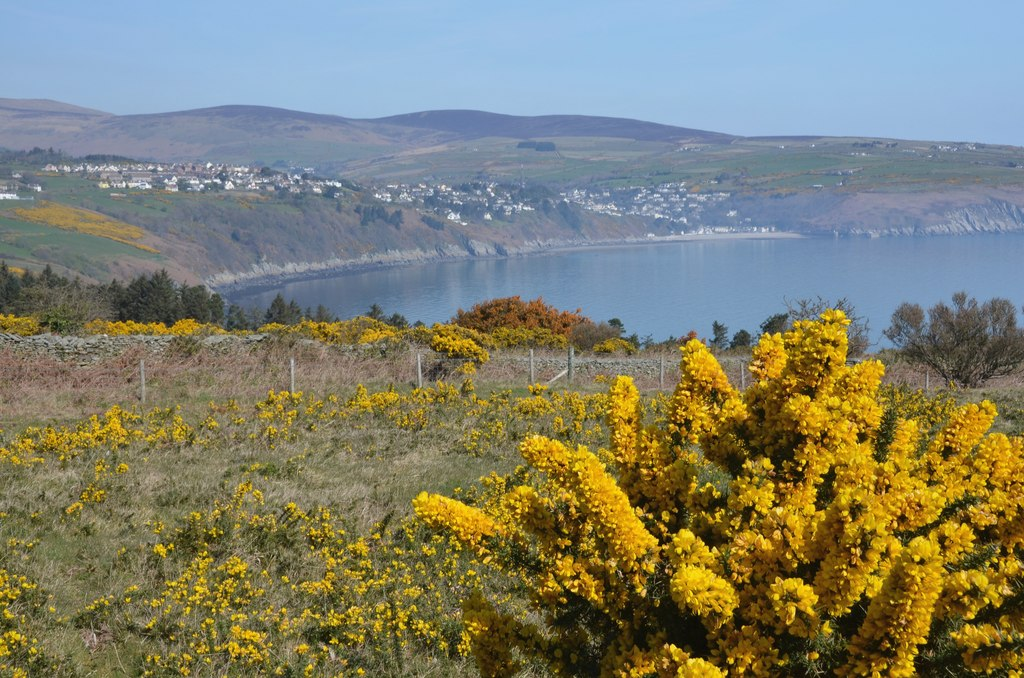
Laxey Bay from the south

The bay is home to eelgrass Zostera marina which is a highly protected species in Manx law, therefore a large part of the bay is closed to potting and anchoring, with fines of £10,000 for infringement.

== Marine nature reserves ==
Laxey Bay was first protected as a "Fisheries Restricted Area" in 2009 to facilitate king scallop ranching, whereby the areas could be seeded with scallops, protected from fishing and then harvested at a later date. The bay was seeded with young scallops, however subsequent surveys indicated that densities remained very low (among the lowest of sites surveyed in Manx waters), likely owing to limited good scallop habitat within the bay.

A Bangor University survey in 2016 surveyed the habitats within the bay. On the basis of the presence of habitats of conservation importance, including maerl and eelgrass (Zostera marina), the survey recommended that the bay remain closed to mobile fishing in the long term. The Department of Environment, Food and Agriculture thereafter consulted the public and stakeholders on making the bay a Marine Nature Reserve.

Tynwald granted Laxey Bay full statutory protection as a Marine Nature Reserve (MNR) under the Wildlife Act 1990 from 1 September 2018. It is now one of ten Marine Nature Reserves found around the Isle of Man, covering over 10% of the country's territorial waters.

The reserve lies west of a line drawn between two points at the following co-ordinates: Carrick Roayrt by Bulgham Bay (54° 14.3742’ N, 04° 21.9420’ W) and Kione ny Cleigh / Clay Head (54° 11.8044’ N, 04° 23.2338’ W), up to and including the shore to the level of the Highest Astronomical Tide. The reserve encompasses an area of 3.97 km^{2} which equates to 0.48% of the Island’s territorial seas in the 0-3 nautical mile zone. Laxey Bay MNR also includes a highly protected Eelgrass Conservation Zone within Garwick Bay.

The reserve is managed by the Department of Environment, Food and Agriculture in collaboration with its fisheries science advisors and other stakeholders including the fishing industry and recreational users.

The Manx Marine Nature Reserves Byelaws 2018 prohibit the extraction of sand, gravel or rock, the deposition of any substance or articles, the use of mobile fishing gear (dredges and trawls) and long lines and the taking of either queen or king scallops whilst diving.

Within the Eelgrass Conservation Zone even anchoring and the use of static fishing gear (pots) is prohibited to protect eelgrass, a protected Manx species and important marine habitat.

While there is currently no speed restrictions for vessels in the reserve, the Isle of Man Government requests mariners have consideration of the impact of high speed on marine animals and other users.

The bay is a "core marine area" of the Isle of Man's UNESCO Biosphere Reserve.

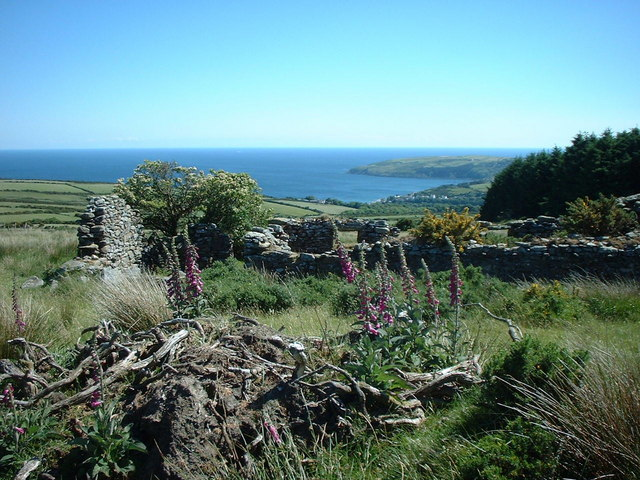
Ruined farm buildings above Laxey. Laxey Bay and Clay Head in the distance.

The rocky coast of Kione ny Cleigh/Clay Head is listed as one of the top 40 geological sites in the Isle of Man and is a candidate Regionally Important Geodiversity Site.

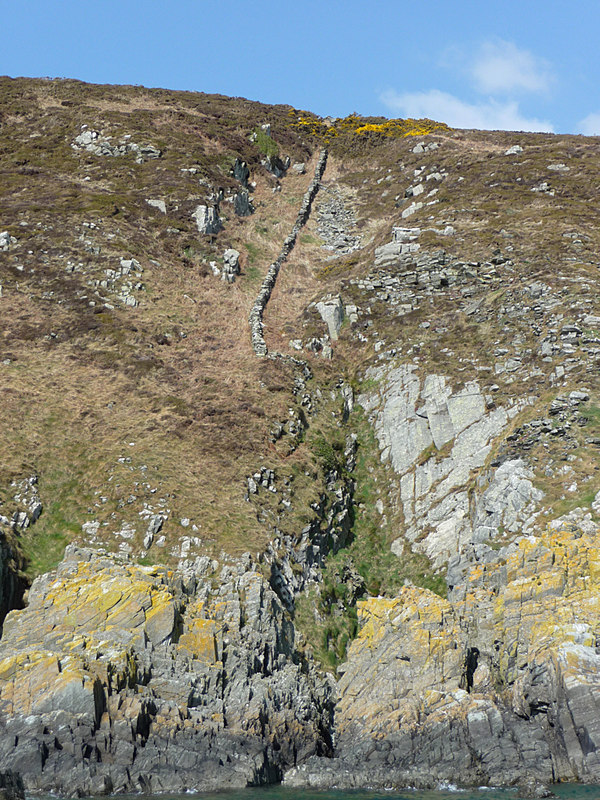
A Quarter wall, on Clay Head

== Wildlife and habitats ==
The primary marine conservation features of Laxey Bay are maerl beds to the north and east, eelgrass meadows in Garwick Bay, kelp forest, rocky reef, the dog whelk (Nucella lapillus) population and relatively large numbers of the long-lived bivalve, the ocean quahog (Arctica islandica). Thornback ray, spotted ray and small-spotted catshark eggcases are regularly found on Garwick Beach, suggesting nearby breeding populations.

Laxey Bay is also notable for its seabird populations, including breeding shag, black guillemot, Eurasian eider, herring gull, great black-backed gull and small numbers of lesser black-backed gull. red-billed chough, peregrine, Eurasian oystercatcher, Eurasian curlew, great cormorant, grey heron and northern fulmar are also commonly seen. Within the bay small numbers of gannet can be seen spectacularly diving for fish, as can large groups (50+) of feeding shag.

Harbour porpoise regularly use the area and occasionally grey seals may be spotted. Between October and March large pods (up to 200 individuals) of bottlenose dolphins and small groups of minke whales (in the autumn) can also be found. Less commonly small pods of Risso’s dolphin and the occasional large pod (over 100) of short-beaked common dolphin can be seen.

== Environmental issues ==
Historically the bay was overfished by the scallop industry, a very environmentally destructive form of fishing, however it is expected the bay will recover in time. Several fish species in the wider Irish Sea, such as cod, herring and skate species have undergone population collapse or decline, which will have impacted populations within the bay.

As of 2025, raw, untreated and unfiltered sewage is still discharged into Garwick Bay, bringing with it large amounts of plastic waste. Both the Laxey River and Gawne River also bring agricultural runoff into the bay, which combined with the sewage, results in both Garwick and Laxey Beaches often failing to achieve minimum bathing water standards during monthly testing.
