= Marine nature reserve =

Type of marine protected area

Marine nature reserve (MNR) is a conservation designation officially awarded by a government to a marine reserve of national significance.

== Republic of Ireland ==
Lough Hyne, a marine lake off of County Cork, is Ireland's only marine nature reserve.

== United Kingdom ==
Marine nature reserves were introduced in the UK by the Wildlife and Countryside Act 1981, and were designed to conserve marine life and geological or physiographical features of special interest. They have similar status and protection to national nature reserves, but were specifically concerned with a marine environment, including both the sea and seabed.

In the UK, there are only three statutory MNRs: Lundy Marine Nature Reserve at Lundy Island (Bristol Channel), Skomer Marine Nature Reserve (Pembrokeshire) and Strangford Lough (County Down).

There is a non-statutory voluntary MNR at St Abbs Head, Berwickshire.

=== Marine conservation zones ===
Schedule 12 of the Marine and Coastal Access Act 2009 allows the conversion the existing MNRs into the newer designation Marine Conservation Zones.

== Isle of Man ==
The Isle of Man government has designated ten marine nature reserves under the Wildlife Act 1990, including Ramsey Bay, Laxey Bay, the West Coast Marine Nature Reserve, Douglas Bay, Little Ness, Niarbyl Bay, Port Erin Bay, Calf and Wart Bank Marine Nature Reserve, and Langness.
