= List of members of the House of Keys, 2021–2026 =

This is a list of members of the House of Keys (the lower house of the Isle of Man parliament), elected at the election held on 23 September 2021.

Constituency	MHKs
Arbory, Castletown & Malew	Jason Moorhouse
Arbory, Castletown & Malew	Tim Glover
Ayre & Michael	Alfred Cannan
Ayre & Michael	Tim Johnston
Douglas Central	Ann Corlett
Douglas Central	Chris Thomas
Douglas East	Joney Faragher
Douglas East	Clare Barber
Douglas North	David Ashford
Douglas North	John Wannenburgh
Douglas South	Claire Christian
Douglas South	Sarah Maltby
Garff	Daphne Caine
Garff	Andrew Smith
Glenfaba & Peel	Kate Lord-Brennan
Glenfaba & Peel	Tim Crookall
Middle	Jane Poole-Wilson
Middle	Stu Peters
Onchan	Julie Edge
Onchan	Rob Callister
Ramsey	Alex Allinson
Ramsey	Lawrie Hooper
Rushen	Juan Watterson
Rushen	Michelle Haywood
