= 2026 Manx general election =

- 24 September 2026

All 24 seats in the House of Keys
- Registered: 66,146
- Turnout: 32,095 (48.52%)
| | First party | Second party |
|---|---|---|
| Leader | | Joney Faragher |
| Party | Independents | Manx Labour |
| Leader's seat | | Douglas East (won) |
| Seats won | 22 | 2 |
| Seat change | ▲1 | Steady |
| Popular vote | 52,455 | 2,849 |
| Percentage | 89.41% | 4.86% |
| Swing | ▲3.12pp | ▼0.22pp |
- Results by constituency
Chief Minister before election
Alfred Cannan
Elected Chief Minister
Chris Thomas

General elections were held on the Isle of Man on 24 September 2026.

== Electoral system ==
The 24 members of the House of Keys are elected from 12 constituencies, each of which returns 2 members. Election is by multiple non-transferable vote in each constituency, with voters having two votes (although voters are not required to use both) for the two seats.

The Chief Minister is appointed after a general election on nomination by the House of Keys.

Following the 2021 Manx general election, the Isle of Man Electoral Commission in January 2024 recommended ways to improve the electoral system which included publishing a study on the practicality of electronic voting. It also recommended reducing the size of the constituencies of Glenfaba & Peel and Ramsey (whose populations had risen) to increase voter equality. Some of the more controversial changes include the "pre-certification" of postal votes and a requirement for candidates to declare their relevant interests before standing for a seat.

Manx elections have long been non-partisan with the Manx Labour Party, Liberal Vannin, and Isle of Man Green Party, all struggling to break into the House of Keys in significant numbers. A newly created right-wing populist party, Isle of Man First, intended to field candidates for the first time on the Isle of Man, fielding 24 candidates across all 12 constituencies, but did not appear on ballot papers.

== Rejected referendum ==
MHK Stu Peters called for a referendum to be held during the general election on the Manx government's commitment to net zero by 2050 to "establish a reliable public mandate and reinforce government's commitment to net zero." Peters has a history of attempting to vote down government environmental regulations in the House of Keys, pushing for the date to be moved back in 2024. He was supported by fellow MHK Julie Edge who stated there was "public support" for Peters' initiative. The proposal was denounced by the government, with Clare Barber, Environment, Food and Agriculture Minister, stating that the general election itself should be a vote on net-zero, with the issue being one of many issues voters will be considering. Similarly Infrastructure Minister Michelle Haywood said net-zero was "not a simple, definable issue" while MLC Gary Clueit called the proposal that of "conspiracy." The government rejected Peters' proposal, and instead passed an amendment to their net-zero bill stating it was "to be democratically considered" as part of the general election.

== Results ==
| Party | Votes | % | Seats | +/– |
|---|---|---|---|---|
| Manx Labour Party | 2,849 | 4.86 | 2 | 0 |
| Liberal Vannin Party | 1,649 | 2.81 | 0 | –1 |
| The Change Movement | 1,539 | 2.62 | 0 | New |
| Transform Isle of Man | 177 | 0.30 | 0 | New |
| Independents | 52,455 | 89.41 | 22 | +1 |
| Total | 58,669 | 100.00 | 24 | 0 |
| Valid votes | 31,995 | 99.69 | | |
| Invalid/blank votes | 100 | 0.31 | | |
| Total votes | 32,095 | 100.00 | | |
| Registered voters/turnout | 66,146 | 48.52 | | |
Source: Isle of Man Today

=== By constituency ===
Arbory, Castletown and Malew
| Candidate | Party | Votes | % | Notes |
|---|---|---|---|---|
| Kirrie Jenkins | Independent | 1,839 | 52.44 | Elected |
| Jason Moorhouse* | Independent | 1,481 | 42.23 | Re-elected |
| Steve Crowther | Independent | 1,251 | 35.67 | |
| Juan Christian | Independent | 794 | 22.64 | |
| Geoff Sutcliffe | Independent | 588 | 16.77 | |
| Mark Firth | Independent | 336 | 9.58 | |
| Abby Quirk | Independent | 175 | 4.99 | |
| Total | | 6,464 | 100.00 | |
| Valid votes | | 3,507 | 99.77 | |
| Invalid/blank votes | | 8 | 0.23 | |
| Total votes | | 3,515 | 100.00 | |
Source: Elections and Voting Isle of Man

Ayre and Michael
| Candidate | Party | Votes | % | Notes |
|---|---|---|---|---|
| Stephen Broad | Independent | 1,680 | 53.55 | Elected |
| Alfred Cannan* | Independent | 1,090 | 34.75 | Re-elected |
| Julia Bell | Independent | 794 | 25.31 | |
| Tim Johnston* | Independent | 746 | 23.78 | Unseated |
| Phil Corkill | Independent | 742 | 23.65 | |
| Steve Curphey | Independent | 279 | 8.89 | |
| Paul Weatherall | Liberal Vannin Party | 238 | 7.59 | |
| Mary Phillips | Independent | 226 | 7.20 | |
| Total | | 5,795 | 100.00 | |
| Valid votes | | 3,137 | 99.68 | |
| Invalid/blank votes | | 10 | 0.32 | |
| Total votes | | 3,147 | 100.00 | |
Source: Elections and Voting Isle of Man

Douglas Central
| Candidate | Party | Votes | % | Notes |
|---|---|---|---|---|
| Peter Shimmin | Independent | 1,382 | 55.66 | Elected |
| Chris Thomas* | Independent | 1,143 | 46.03 | Re-elected |
| Ann Corlett* | Independent | 683 | 27.51 | Unseated |
| Devon Watson | Manx Labour Party | 651 | 26.22 | |
| Andrea Krüger | Independent | 357 | 14.38 | |
| Sharon Lee Bridgens | Change | 181 | 7.29 | |
| George Hargreaves | Transform Isle of Man | 120 | 4.83 | |
| Creena Mason | Transform Isle of Man | 57 | 2.30 | |
| Total | | 4,574 | 100.00 | |
| Valid votes | | 2,483 | 99.88 | |
| Invalid/blank votes | | 3 | 0.12 | |
| Total votes | | 2,486 | 100.00 | |
Source: Elections and Voting Isle of Man

Douglas East
| Candidate | Party | Votes | % | Notes |
|---|---|---|---|---|
| Andrew Saunders | Independent | 820 | 48.24 | Elected |
| Joney Faragher* | Manx Labour Party | 682 | 40.12 | Re-elected |
| Dave Mackey | Independent | 632 | 37.18 | |
| Clare Barber* | Independent | 543 | 31.94 | Unseated |
| Andrew Forster | Change | 331 | 19.47 | |
| Total | | 3,008 | 100.00 | |
| Valid votes | | 1,700 | 99.77 | |
| Invalid/blank votes | | 4 | 0.23 | |
| Total votes | | 1,704 | 100.00 | |
Source: Elections and Voting Isle of Man

Douglas North
| Candidate | Party | Votes | % | Notes |
|---|---|---|---|---|
| David Ashford* | Independent | 1,121 | 57.14 | Re-elected |
| Damian Ciappelli | Independent | 798 | 40.67 | Elected |
| Jason Cheetham | Independent | 594 | 30.28 | |
| Hugo Yates | Independent | 351 | 17.89 | |
| Peter Washington | Manx Labour Party | 271 | 13.81 | |
| Janet Thommeny | Independent | 239 | 12.18 | |
| Denis J Staunton | Change | 194 | 9.89 | |
| Total | | 3,568 | 100.00 | |
| Valid votes | | 1,962 | 99.75 | |
| Invalid/blank votes | | 5 | 0.25 | |
| Total votes | | 1,967 | 100.00 | |
Source: Elections and Voting Isle of Man

Douglas South
| Candidate | Party | Votes | % | Notes |
|---|---|---|---|---|
| Sarah Maltby* | Manx Labour Party | 1,245 | 65.08 | Re-elected |
| Claire Christian* | Independent politician | 1,064 | 55.62 | Re-elected |
| Dean Bolton | Change | 518 | 27.08 | |
| Livia Lenarduzzi | Independent | 399 | 20.86 | |
| Arwid Hall | Independent | 204 | 10.66 | |
| Total | | 3,430 | 100.00 | |
| Valid votes | | 1,913 | 99.69 | |
| Invalid/blank votes | | 6 | 0.31 | |
| Total votes | | 1,919 | 100.00 | |
Source: Elections and Voting Isle of Man

Garff
| Candidate | Party | Votes | % | Notes |
|---|---|---|---|---|
| Richard Henthorn | Independent | 1,167 | 39.95 | Elected |
| Vicki Hewison | Independent | 968 | 33.14 | Elected |
| Aishlinn Creer | Independent | 891 | 30.50 | |
| Martyn Perkins | Independent | 836 | 28.62 | |
| Seán Boström | Independent | 542 | 18.56 | |
| Daphne Caine* | Independent | 389 | 13.32 | Unseated |
| Anthony Allen | Independent | 315 | 10.78 | |
| Nigel Dunmore | Independent | 286 | 9.79 | |
| Peter Kermeen | Independent | 79 | 2.70 | |
| Total | | 5,473 | 100.00 | |
| Valid votes | | 2,921 | 99.83 | |
| Invalid/blank votes | | 5 | 0.17 | |
| Total votes | | 2,926 | 100.00 | |
Source: Elections and Voting Isle of Man

Glenfaba and Peel
| Candidate | Party | Votes | % | Notes |
|---|---|---|---|---|
| Katryna Baptist | Independent | 1,232 | 36.56 | Elected |
| Daniel Davison | Independent | 1,147 | 34.04 | Elected |
| James Hampton | Independent | 1,073 | 31.84 | |
| Geoffrey Pugh | Independent | 987 | 29.29 | |
| Ray Harmer | Independent | 654 | 19.41 | |
| Colleen Dale-Beeton | Independent | 629 | 18.66 | |
| Mark Cleator | Change | 315 | 9.35 | |
| Alex Perriam | Independent | 262 | 7.77 | |
| Total | | 6,299 | 100.00 | |
| Valid votes | | 3,370 | 99.59 | |
| Invalid/blank votes | | 14 | 0.41 | |
| Total votes | | 3,384 | 100.00 | |
Source: Elections and Voting Isle of Man

Middle
| Candidate | Party | Votes | % | Notes |
|---|---|---|---|---|
| Jane Poole-Wilson* | Independent | 1,134 | 48.80 | Re-elected |
| James Cochrane | Independent | 816 | 35.11 | Elected |
| Alfred Caine | Independent | 655 | 28.18 | |
| Simon Sinclair | Independent | 563 | 24.23 | |
| Andre Risha | Independent | 490 | 21.08 | |
| Jason Moore | Independent | 437 | 18.80 | |
| Graham Taylor | Independent | 161 | 6.93 | |
| Total | | 4,256 | 100.00 | |
| Valid votes | | 2,324 | 99.57 | |
| Invalid/blank votes | | 10 | 0.43 | |
| Total votes | | 2,334 | 100.00 | |
Source: Elections and Voting Isle of Man

Onchan
| Candidate | Party | Votes | % | Notes |
|---|---|---|---|---|
| Rachel Glover | Independent | 1,245 | 47.56 | Elected |
| Rob Callister* | Independent | 1,103 | 42.13 | Re-elected |
| Julie Edge* | Independent | 866 | 33.08 | Unseated |
| Peter Karran | Liberal Vannin Party | 738 | 28.19 | |
| Gabriella Corkish | Independent | 725 | 27.69 | |
| Oliver Lockwood | Independent | 50 | 1.91 | |
| Total | | 4,727 | 100.00 | |
| Valid votes | | 2,618 | 99.62 | |
| Invalid/blank votes | | 10 | 0.38 | |
| Total votes | | 2,628 | 100.00 | |
Source: Elections and Voting Isle of Man

Ramsey
| Candidate | Party | Votes | % | Notes |
|---|---|---|---|---|
| Juan McGuinness | Independent | 1,703 | 60.91 | Elected |
| Robert Cowell | Independent | 1,395 | 49.89 | Elected |
| Peter Whiteway | Independent | 1,218 | 43.56 | |
| Lawrie Hooper* | Liberal Vannin Party | 489 | 17.49 | Unseated |
| Janine Shimmin | Independent | 325 | 11.62 | |
| Nigel Dunmore | Independent | 162 | 5.79 | |
| Total | | 5,292 | 100.00 | |
| Valid votes | | 2,796 | 99.82 | |
| Invalid/blank votes | | 5 | 0.18 | |
| Total votes | | 2,801 | 100.00 | |
Source: Elections and Voting Isle of Man

Rushen
| Candidate | Party | Votes | % | Notes |
|---|---|---|---|---|
| Michael Crowe | Independent | 1,878 | 57.54 | Elected |
| Mark Kemp | Independent | 1,120 | 34.31 | Elected |
| Simon Williams | Independent | 1,040 | 31.86 | |
| Michelle Haywood* | Independent | 790 | 24.20 | Unseated |
| Laurence Vaughan-Williams | Independent | 592 | 18.14 | |
| Helen Sheppard | Independent | 258 | 7.90 | |
| Gary Chambers | Liberal Vannin Party | 184 | 5.64 | |
| Total | | 5,862 | 100.00 | |
| Valid votes | | 3,264 | 99.63 | |
| Invalid/blank votes | | 12 | 0.37 | |
| Total votes | | 3,276 | 100.00 | |
Source: Elections and Voting Isle of Man
