= List of members of the House of Keys, 2016–2021 =

This is a list of members of the House of Keys (the lower house of the Isle of Man parliament), elected at the election held on 22 September 2016.

Constituency	MHKs
Arbory, Castletown & Malew	Jason Moorhouse
Arbory, Castletown & Malew	Graham Cregeen
Ayre & Michael	Alfred Cannan
Ayre & Michael	Tim Baker
Douglas Central	Ann Corlett
Douglas Central	Chris Thomas
Douglas East	Claire Bettison
Douglas East	Chris Robertshaw
Douglas North	David Ashford
Douglas North	Ralph Peake
Douglas South	Kathleen Beecroft
Douglas South	William Malarkey
Garff	Martyn Perkins
Garff	Daphne Caine
Glenfaba & Peel	Ray Harmer
Glenfaba & Peel	Geoffrey Boot
Middle	Bill Shimmins
Middle	Howard Quayle
Onchan	Julie Edge
Onchan	Rob Callister
Ramsey	Alex Allinson
Ramsey	Lawrie Hooper
Rushen	Juan Watterson
Rushen	Laurence Skelly
