= 2021 Manx general election =

- 23 September 2021

All 24 seats in the House of Keys
	First party	Second party	Third party
Leader		Joney Faragher	Lawrie Hooper
Party	Independents	Manx Labour	Liberal Vannin
Leader's seat		Douglas East (won)	Ramsey
Seats won	21	2	1
Seat change	Steady	▲2	▼2
Popular vote	51,015	3,006	3,138
Percentage	86.29%	5.08%	5.31%
Swing	▼6.70pp	▲3.71pp	▼1.05pp
- Most voted candidate represented by the colour of the constituency. Second most voted candidate represented by the additional circle.
Chief Minister before election
Howard Quayle
Independent
Elected Chief Minister
Alfred Cannan
Independent

General elections were held in the Isle of Man on 23 September 2021. A record ten women were elected, twice as many as the five elected at the previous election. For the first time, in two constituencies, both elected MHKs were women. Four government ministers failed to be re-elected.

== Electoral system ==
The 24 members of the House of Keys are elected from 12 constituencies, each of which returns 2 members. Election is by multiple non-transferable vote in each constituency, with voters having two votes (although voters are not required to use both) for the two seats.

The Chief Minister is appointed after a general election on nomination by the House of Keys.

== Candidates ==
A total of 65 candidates ran. The incumbent Chief Minister, Howard Quayle (MHK for Middle) did not stand for re-election.

== Results ==
Over 85% of candidates ran without party affiliation, and the largest elected party contingent, the Manx Labour Party, consisted of two MHKs. The Manx Labour Party ran three candidates, Liberal Vannin ran four, and the Isle of Man Green Party ran two. The 2021 election was the first election in which the Green Party fielded candidates, having previously only stood in local elections.

Party	Votes	%	Seats	+/–
Liberal Vannin Party	3,138	5.33	1	–2
Manx Labour Party	3,006	5.10	2	+2
Isle of Man Green Party	1,964	3.33	0	New
Independents	50,806	86.24	21	0
Total	58,914	100.00	24	0
Valid votes	32,812	99.75		
Invalid/blank votes	81	0.25		
Total votes	32,893	100.00		
Registered voters/turnout	64,744	50.80		
Source: gov.im

=== By constituency ===
Arbory, Castletown & Malew
Candidate	Party	Votes	%	Notes
Jason Moorhouse	Independent	1,988	58.83	Re-elected
Tim Glover	Independent	1,818	53.80	Elected
Steve Crowther	Independent	1,488	44.04	
Graham Cregeen	Independent	730	21.60	Unseated
Total		6,024	100.00	
Valid votes		3,379	99.76	
Invalid/blank votes		8	0.24	
Total votes		3,387	100.00	
Registered voters/turnout		5,990	56.54	
Source: Manx Radio, Isle of Man Government

Ayre & Michael
Candidate	Party	Votes	%	Notes
Alfred Cannan	Independent politician	2,117	66.07	Re-elected
Tim Johnston	Independent politician	1,203	37.55	Elected
Tim Baker	Independent politician	709	22.13	Unseated
Paul Weatherall	Liberal Vannin Party	540	16.85	
Duncan Livingstone	Independent politician	517	16.14	
Phil Corkill	Independent politician	378	11.80	
Dr Sos Boussougou	Independent politician	189	5.90	
Madeleine Westall	Independent politician	168	5.24	
Total		5,821	100.00	
Valid votes		3,204	99.81	
Invalid/blank votes		6	0.19	
Total votes		3,210	100.00	
Registered voters/turnout		5,127	62.61	
Source: Manx Radio,

Douglas Central
Candidate	Party	Votes	%	Notes
Ann Corlett	Independent politician	1,400	61.35	Re-elected
Chris Thomas	Independent politician	1,319	57.80	Re-elected
Damien Ciappelli	Independent politician	951	41.67	
Sara Hackman	Independent politician	369	16.17	
Total		4,039	100.00	
Valid votes		2,282	99.69	
Invalid/blank votes		7	0.31	
Total votes		2,289	100.00	
Registered voters/turnout		5,327	42.97	
Source: Manx Radio, Isle of Man Government

Douglas East
Candidate	Party	Votes	%	Notes
Joney Faragher	Manx Labour Party	741	41.82	Elected
Clare Barber	Independent politician	692	39.05	Elected
Michael Josem	Liberal Vannin Party	508	28.67	
Jon Joughin	Independent politician	477	26.92	
Peter Gilmour	Independent politician	313	17.66	
Amanda Walker	Independent politician	217	12.25	
Christine Urquhart	Independent politician	152	8.58	
Total		3,100	100.00	
Valid votes		1,772	99.77	
Invalid/blank votes		4	0.23	
Total votes		1,776	100.00	
Registered voters/turnout		4,891	36.31	
Source: Manx Radio, Isle of Man Government

Douglas North
Candidate	Party	Votes	%	Notes
David Ashford	Independent politician	1,567	79.06	Re-elected
John Wannenburgh	Independent politician	753	37.99	Elected
Ralph Peake	Independent politician	682	34.41	Unseated
Kevin Oliphant-Smith	Independent politician	492	24.82	
Total		3,494	100.00	
Valid votes		1,982	99.55	
Invalid/blank votes		9	0.45	
Total votes		1,991	100.00	
Registered voters/turnout		4,713	42.24	
Source: Manx Radio, Isle of Man Government

Douglas South
Candidate	Party	Votes	%	Notes
Sarah Maltby	Manx Labour Party	1,244	54.20	Elected
Claire Christian	Independent politician	1,242	54.12	Elected
Paul Quine	Independent politician	1,094	47.67	Unseated
Gerard Higgins	Independent politician	552	24.05	
Total		4,132	100.00	
Valid votes		2,295	99.83	
Invalid/blank votes		4	0.17	
Total votes		2,299	100.00	
Registered voters/turnout		4,897	46.95	
Source: Manx Radio, Isle of Man Government

Garff
Candidate	Party	Votes	%	Notes
Daphne Caine	Independent politician	1,122	41.28	Re-elected
Andrew Smith	Independent politician	1,112	40.91	Elected
Gareth Young	Manx Labour Party	1,021	37.56	
Martyn Perkins	Independent politician	971	35.72	Unseated
Jamie Smith	Independent politician	576	21.19	
Total		4,802	100.00	
Valid votes		2,718	99.74	
Invalid/blank votes		7	0.26	
Total votes		2,725	100.00	
Registered voters/turnout		5,292	51.49	
Source: Manx Radio, Isle of Man Government

Glenfaba & Peel
Candidate	Party	Votes	%	Notes
Kate Lord-Brennan	Independent politician	2,150	59.08	Elected
Tim Crookall	Independent politician	1,134	31.16	Elected
Ray Harmer	Independent politician	1,073	29.49	Unseated
Trevor Cowin	Independent politician	1,070	29.40	
Leo Cussons	Isle of Man Green Party	855	23.50	
Geoffrey Boot	Independent politician	273	7.50	Unseated
Mikey Lee	Independent politician	201	5.52	
Total		6,756	100.00	
Valid votes		3,639	99.84	
Invalid/blank votes		6	0.16	
Total votes		3,645	100.00	
Registered voters/turnout		6,380	57.13	
Source: Manx Radio, Isle of Man Government

Middle
Candidate	Party	Votes	%	Notes
Jane Poole-Wilson	Independent politician	1,788	74.19	Elected
Stu Peters	Independent politician	965	40.04	Elected
Alison Lynch	Independent politician	792	32.86	
Keiran Hannifin	Independent politician	553	22.95	
David Fowler	Independent politician	163	6.76	
Total		4,261	100.00	
Valid votes		2,410	99.71	
Invalid/blank votes		7	0.29	
Total votes		2,417	100.00	
Registered voters/turnout		4,755	50.83	
Source: Manx Radio, Isle of Man Government

Onchan
Candidate	Party	Votes	%	Notes
Rob Callister	Independent politician	1,600	68.52	Re-elected
Julie Edge	Independent politician	1,363	58.37	Re-elected
James Cherry	Independent politician	570	24.41	
Peter Willers	Liberal Vannin Party	433	18.54	
Michael Leather	Independent politician	177	7.58	
Total		4,143	100.00	
Valid votes		2,335	99.53	
Invalid/blank votes		11	0.47	
Total votes		2,346	100.00	
Registered voters/turnout		5,200	45.12	
Source: Manx Radio, Isle of Man Government

Ramsey
Candidate	Party	Votes	%	Notes
Lawrie Hooper	Liberal Vannin Party	1,657	49.21	Re-elected
Alex Allinson	Independent politician	1,557	46.24	Re-elected
Robert Cowell	Independent politician	679	20.17	
Luke Parker	Independent politician	664	19.72	
Simon Mann	Independent politician	555	16.48	
Erica Spencer	Independent politician	438	13.01	
Leonard Singer	Independent politician	405	12.03	
Jonathan Kinrade	Independent politician	345	10.25	
Total		6,300	100.00	
Valid votes		3,367	99.88	
Invalid/blank votes		4	0.12	
Total votes		3,371	100.00	
Registered voters/turnout		6,288	53.61	
Source: Manx Radio, Isle of Man Government

Rushen
Candidate	Party	Votes	%	Notes
Juan Watterson	Independent politician	2,384	69.52	Re-elected
Dr Michelle Haywood	Independent politician	1,386	40.42	Elected
Mark Kemp	Independent politician	1,163	33.92	
Andrew Langan-Newton	Isle of Man Green Party	1,109	32.34	
Total		6,042	100.00	
Valid votes		3,429	99.77	
Invalid/blank votes		8	0.23	
Total votes		3,437	100.00	
Registered voters/turnout		5,884	58.41	
Source: Manx Radio, Isle of Man Government

== See also ==
- List of members of the House of Keys, 2021–2026
- List of political parties on the Isle of Man
- Politics of the Isle of Man
