= 2006 Manx general election =

- 23 November 2006

All 24 seats in the House of Keys
	First party	Second party	Third party
Party	Independents	Liberal Vannin	Manx Labour
Seats won	21	2	1
Seat change	▼1	New	▼1
Popular vote	41,613	7,323	2,561
Percentage	80.81%	14.22%	4.97
Swing	▼1.49pp	New	▼4.10pp
Chief Minister before election
Donald Gelling
Independent
Elected Chief Minister
Tony Brown
Independent

General elections were held on the Isle of Man on Thursday, 23 November 2006. The voting age was lowered to 16 at this election. As usual, the election was dominated by independents, who took 21 of the 24 seats.

== Background ==
In the previous elections in 2001, independents won 22 out of the 24 seats and the Manx Labour Party won two seats.

== Results ==
Party	Votes	%	Seats
Liberal Vannin Party	7,323	14.22	2
Manx Labour Party	2,561	4.97	1
Independents	41,613	80.81	21
**Total**	**51,497**	**100.00**	**24**
Valid votes	30,386	99.62	
Invalid/blank votes	116	0.38	
Total votes	**30,502**	**100.00**	
Registered voters/turnout	49,855	61.18	
Source: Isle of Man Government, Manx Radio

=== By constituency ===
The winners in bold. Several constituencies have more than one member elected. Independent Eddie Teare was elected unopposed in Ayre.

Castletown
Candidate	Party	Votes	%
**Tony Brown**	Independent	915	73.20
Roy Redmayne	Liberal Vannin Party	335	26.80
**Total**		**1,250**	**100.00**
Valid votes		1,250	99.44
Invalid/blank votes		7	0.56
Total votes		**1,257**	**100.00**
Registered voters/turnout		2,022	62.17

Douglas East
Candidate	Party	Votes	%
**Phil Braidwood**	Independent	777	28.63
**Brenda Cannell**	Independent / (APG)	728	26.82
Chris Robertshaw	Independent	574	21.15
William Edward Platt	Liberal Vannin Party	252	9.29
Stephen Alan Osborne	Independent	194	7.15
Carol Ann Jempson	Independent	189	6.96
**Total**		**2,714**	**100.00**
Valid votes		1,540	99.48
Invalid/blank votes		8	0.52
Total votes		**1,548**	**100.00**
Registered voters/turnout		3,035	51.00

Douglas North
Candidate	Party	Votes	%
**Bill Henderson**	Independent	1,627	38.55
**John Houghton**	Independent	1,615	38.27
Michael Ronald Coleman	Manx Labour Party	688	16.30
Mark Atherton	Independent	290	6.87
**Total**		**4,220**	**100.00**
Valid votes		2,248	99.60
Invalid/blank votes		9	0.40
Total votes		**2,257**	**100.00**
Registered voters/turnout		4,149	54.40

Douglas South
Candidate	Party	Votes	%
**David Cretney**	Manx Labour Party	1,873	41.13
**Bill Malarkey**	Liberal Vannin Party	873	19.17
David Buttery	Independent	829	18.20
Philip William Kermode	Independent	399	8.76
Rodney Clarke	Independent	361	7.93
Frank Schuengel	Independent	219	4.81
**Total**		**4,554**	**100.00**
Valid votes		2,504	99.52
Invalid/blank votes		12	0.48
Total votes		**2,516**	**100.00**
Registered voters/turnout		4,372	57.55

Douglas West
Candidate	Party	Votes	%
**Geoff Corkish**	Independent	1,248	36.00
**John Shimmin**	Independent	1,009	29.10
Geoff Cannell	Independent	692	19.96
Roland Stanley Arden-Corris	Liberal Vannin Party	518	14.94
**Total**		**3,467**	**100.00**
Valid votes		1,945	99.54
Invalid/blank votes		9	0.46
Total votes		**1,954**	**100.00**
Registered voters/turnout		3,440	56.80

Garff
Candidate	Party	Votes	%
**Steve Rodan**	Independent	1,400	72.77
Nigel Anthony Dobson	Liberal Vannin Party	524	27.23
**Total**		**1,924**	**100.00**
Valid votes		1,924	99.59
Invalid/blank votes		8	0.41
Total votes		**1,932**	**100.00**
Registered voters/turnout		3,010	64.19

Glenfaba
Candidate	Party	Votes	%
**David Anderson**	Independent	760	58.96
Geoffrey Boot	Independent	529	41.04
**Total**		**1,289**	**100.00**
Valid votes		1,289	99.00
Invalid/blank votes		13	1.00
Total votes		**1,302**	**100.00**
Registered voters/turnout		1,733	75.13

Malew and Santon
Candidate	Party	Votes	%
**Graham Cregeen**	Independent	573	45.12
Andrew Cowin Douglas	Independent	439	34.57
Carol Kermode	Independent	258	20.31
**Total**		**1,270**	**100.00**
Valid votes		1,270	99.37
Invalid/blank votes		8	0.63
Total votes		**1,278**	**100.00**
Registered voters/turnout		2,103	60.77

Michael
Candidate	Party	Votes	%
**David Cannan**	Independent	1,062	76.35
Ronald Paul Berry	Independent	329	23.65
**Total**		**1,391**	**100.00**
Valid votes		1,391	99.29
Invalid/blank votes		10	0.71
Total votes		**1,401**	**100.00**
Registered voters/turnout		2,180	64.27

Middle
Candidate	Party	Votes	%
**Martyn Quayle**	Independent	963	50.05
Kathleen Joan Beecroft	Liberal Vannin Party	548	28.48
Andrew Charles Richard Jessop	Independent	413	21.47
**Total**		**1,924**	**100.00**
Valid votes		1,924	99.64
Invalid/blank votes		7	0.36
Total votes		**1,931**	**100.00**
Registered voters/turnout		3,345	57.73

Onchan
Candidate	Party	Votes	%
**Peter Karran**	Liberal Vannin Party	2,600	28.07
**Adrian Earnshaw**	Independent	2,078	22.43
**David Quirk**	Independent	1,565	16.89
Brian Stowell	Independent	1,373	14.82
Stephen Richard James Babb	Independent	1,047	11.30
Andrew James Dossor	Independent	601	6.49
**Total**		**9,264**	**100.00**
Valid votes		3,789	99.95
Invalid/blank votes		2	0.05
Total votes		**3,791**	**100.00**
Registered voters/turnout		6,143	61.71

Peel
Candidate	Party	Votes	%
**Tim Crookall**	Independent	839	44.82
Hazel Hannan	Independent	712	38.03
Rodger Mark Gimbert	Independent	321	17.15
**Total**		**1,872**	**100.00**
Valid votes		1,872	99.36
Invalid/blank votes		12	0.64
Total votes		**1,884**	**100.00**
Registered voters/turnout		2,970	63.43

Ramsey
Candidate	Party	Votes	%
**Annie Craine**	Independent	1,969	32.65
**Allan Bell**	Independent	1,768	29.32
Leonard Singer	Independent / (APG)	1,621	26.88
Nigel Howard Malpass	Liberal Vannin Party	673	11.16
**Total**		**6,031**	**100.00**
Valid votes		3,427	99.80
Invalid/blank votes		7	0.20
Total votes		**3,434**	**100.00**
Registered voters/turnout		5,154	66.63

Rushen
Candidate	Party	Votes	%
**Juan Watterson**	Independent	2,430	23.53
**Phil Gawne**	Independent	1,794	17.37
**Quintin Gill**	Independent	1,689	16.36
Philip Henry Crellin	Independent	1,432	13.87
John Rimington	Independent	1,048	10.15
Anthony Stuart Wright	Liberal Vannin Party	1,000	9.68
Adrian Tinkler	Independent	934	9.04
**Total**		**10,327**	**100.00**
Valid votes		4,013	99.90
Invalid/blank votes		4	0.10
Total votes		**4,017**	**100.00**
Registered voters/turnout		6,199	64.80
