= 2011 Manx general election =

- 29 September 2011

All 24 seats in the House of Keys
	First party	Second party	Third party
Party	Independents	Liberal Vannin	Manx Labour
Seats won	20	3	1
Seat change	▼1	▲1	Steady
Popular vote	42,543	11,679	1,749
Percentage	76.01%	20.87%	3.12%
Swing	▼4.79pp	▲6.65pp	▼1.85pp
Chief Minister before election
Tony Brown
Independent
Elected Chief Minister
Allan Bell
Independent

General elections were held on the Isle of Man on 29 September 2011 to elect 24 members to the island's lower house, the House of Keys. 60,000 residents were eligible to vote, including 16- and 17-year-olds. Successful candidates were sworn in on 4 October 2011. A total of about 34,000 people voted in the elections, some of whom were in multi-member constituencies and cast more than one vote.

== Results ==
Party	Votes	%	Seats	+/–
Liberal Vannin Party	11,679	20.87	3	+1
Manx Labour Party	1,749	3.12	1	0
Independents	42,543	76.01	20	–1
Total	55,971	100.00	24	0
Valid votes	34,369	99.65		
Invalid/blank votes	120	0.35		
Total votes	34,489	100.00		
Registered voters/turnout	60,382	57.12		
Source: Isle of Man Government, Manx Radio

=== By constituency ===
Ayre; 1 return
Party	Candidate	Votes	
Party	Candidate	Count	Of total (%)
Independent	Eddie Teare	1,060	65.3
Independent	Andrew Newington-Bridges	429	26.4
Liberal Vannin	Patrick Ayres	134	8.3
Total votes		1,623	
Total ballots		1,623	
Rejected ballots		9	
Turnout		1,632	67.4
Registered electors		2,423	

Castletown; 1 return
Party	Candidate	Votes	
Party	Candidate	Count	Of total (%)
Independent	Richard Ronan	520	35.5
Independent	Jason Moorhouse	479	32.7
Independent	Mahendra Patel	280	19.1
Independent	Colin Leather	108	7.4
Independent	Carol Quine	43	2.9
Independent	David Pownall	33	2.3
Total votes		1,463	
Total ballots		1,463	
Rejected ballots		3	
Turnout		1,470	65.7
Registered electors		2,237	

Douglas East; 2 returns
Party	Candidate	Votes	
Party	Candidate	Count	Of total (%)
Independent	Chris Robertshaw	915	30.9
Independent	Brenda Cannell	757	25.5
Independent	Paul Moulton	490	16.5
Independent	Geraldine O'Neill	441	14.9
Independent	Richard Kissack	238	8.0
Independent	John Karran	123	4.1
Total votes		2,964	
Total ballots		1,688	
Rejected ballots		12	
Turnout		1,700	41.1
Registered electors		4,136	

Douglas North; 2 returns
Party	Candidate	Votes	
Party	Candidate	Count	Of total (%)
Independent	John Houghton	1,376	32.6
Independent	Bill Henderson	1,257	29.8
Independent	Theo Fleurbaay	869	20.6
Liberal Vannin	Peter Hill	722	17.1
Total votes		4,224	
Total ballots		2,392	
Rejected ballots		9	
Turnout		2,401	50.4
Registered electors		4,761	

Douglas South; 2 returns
Party	Candidate	Votes	
Party	Candidate	Count	Of total (%)
Manx Labour	David Cretney	1,749	44.2
Liberal Vannin	Kate Beecroft	1,191	30.1
Independent	Bill Malarkey	1,019	25.7
Total votes		3,959	
Total ballots		2,402	
Rejected ballots		4	
Turnout		2,406	46.6
Registered electors		5,165	

Douglas West; 2 returns
Party	Candidate	Votes	
Party	Candidate	Count	Of total (%)
Independent	John Shimmin	1,316	33.1
Independent	Geoff Corkish	1,017	25.6
Liberal Vannin	Chris Thomas	913	23.0
Independent	John Skinner	732	18.4
Total votes		3,978	
Total ballots		2,252	
Rejected ballots		4	
Turnout		2,256	55.8
Registered electors		4,044	

Garff; 1 return
Party	Candidate	Votes	
Party	Candidate	Count	Of total (%)
Independent	Steve Rodan	1,725	92.7
Liberal Vannin	Nigel Dobson	136	7.3
Total votes		1,861	
Total ballots		1,861	
Rejected ballots		10	
Turnout		1,871	55.1
Registered electors		3,397	

Glenfaba; 1 return
Party	Candidate	Votes	
Party	Candidate	Count	Of total (%)
Independent	David Anderson	649	46.5
Independent	Geoffrey Boot	557	39.9
Independent	Matthew Wadsworth	189	13.5
Total votes		1,395	
Total ballots		1,395	
Rejected ballots		11	
Turnout		1,406	69.7
Registered electors		2,016	

Malew & Santon; 1 return
Party	Candidate	Votes	
Party	Candidate	Count	Of total (%)
Independent	Graham Cregeen	877	71.5
Independent	Gareth Kelly	262	21.4
Independent	John Hanson	87	7.1
Total votes		1,226	
Total ballots		1,226	
Rejected ballots		21	
Turnout		1,247	54
Registered electors		2,309	

Michael; 1 return
Party	Candidate	Votes	
Party	Candidate	Count	Of total (%)
Independent	Alfred Cannan	1,014	64.1
Independent	David Talbot	325	20.5
Independent	Paul Heavey	244	15.4
Total votes		1,583	
Total ballots		1,583	
Rejected ballots		7	
Turnout		1,590	62.6
Registered electors		2,540	

Middle; 1 return
Party	Candidate	Votes	
Party	Candidate	Count	Of total (%)
Independent	Howard Quayle	922	41.9
Independent	Paul Craine	560	25.5
Independent	Martyn Quayle	466	21.2
Liberal Vannin	Juan Cottier	250	11.4
Total votes		2,198	
Total ballots		2,198	
Rejected ballots		8	
Turnout		2,206	56.1
Registered electors		3,930	

Onchan; 3 returns
Party	Candidate	Votes	
Party	Candidate	Count	Of total (%)
Liberal Vannin	Peter Karran	2,704	26.8
Liberal Vannin	Zac Hall	1,812	18.0
Independent	David Quirk	1,594	15.8
Independent	Adrian Earnshaw	1,543	15.3
Independent	June Kelly	1,339	13.3
Independent	Brian Stowell	1,093	10.8
Total votes		10,085	
Total ballots		4,016	
Rejected ballots		1	
Turnout		4,017	57.5
Registered electors		6,982	

Peel; 1 return
Party	Candidate	Votes	
Party	Candidate	Count	Of total (%)
Independent	Tim Crookall	646	28.1
Independent	Leslie Hanson	615	26.7
Independent	Raymond Harmer	522	22.7
Independent	Arran Kaighin	265	11.5
Independent	Rodger Gimbert	252	11.0
Total votes		2,300	
Total ballots		2,300	
Rejected ballots		6	
Turnout		2,321	58.6
Registered electors		3,693	

Ramsey; 2 returns
Party	Candidate	Votes	
Party	Candidate	Count	Of total (%)
Independent	Allan Bell	1,988	29.7
Independent	Leonard Singer	1,911	28.5
Independent	Anne Craine	1,817	27.1
Liberal Vannin	Linda Bowers-Kasch	427	6.4
Independent	Lawrie Hooper	310	4.6
Independent	John McDonough	243	3.6
Total votes		6,696	
Total ballots		3,737	
Rejected ballots		12	
Turnout		3,749	64.8
Registered electors		5,789	

Rushen; 3 returns
Party	Candidate	Votes	
Party	Candidate	Count	Of total (%)
Independent	Juan Watterson	3,080	29.6
Independent	Laurence Skelly	2,021	19.4
Independent	Phil Gawne	1,941	18.6
Independent	Quintin Gill	1,722	16.5
Independent	John Orme	1,195	11.5
Liberal Vannin	David Jones	457	4.4
Total votes		10,416	
Total ballots		4,214	
Rejected ballots		3	
Turnout		4,217	60.6
Registered electors		6,960	
