= Claire Christian (politician) =

Manx politician

The Honourable Claire Christian MHK

Minister for Health and Social Care
- Incumbent
- Assumed office 25 November 2024
- Chief Minister: Alfred Cannan and Chris Thomas
- Preceded by: Lawrie Hooper

Member of the House of Keys for Douglas South
- Incumbent
- Assumed office 28 August 2020 Serving with Sarah Maltby

Personal details
- Born: 1973/1974 Douglas, Isle of Man
- Party: Independent
- Education: University of East London; University of Sunderland

Claire Sarah Beverley Christian (born c. 1973/1974) is a Manx politician. She had careers in fashion and teaching before going into politics.

== Early life ==
Christian was born in Douglas. She completed her A Levels at Ballakermeen High School and pursued a year-long foundation course at the Isle of Man College. She graduated from the University of East London in 1998 with a Bachelor of Arts (BA) in Fashion Design and Marketing. She later obtained a GTP teaching qualification in Design and Technology and pursued a Masters in Education (MEd) at the University of Sunderland.

== Career ==
For a decade, Christian worked for the fashion brand Burberry in various operational and management positions. She was then Head of Womenswear at Hardy Amies before joining Melissa Odabash as Head Designer.

In 2010, Christian relocated to Northumberland to become a secondary school teacher. In 2012, she moved back to the Isle of Man, where she started her own fashion business.

She was elected in a 2020 by-election. In February 2024, she resigned from the Department of Education, Sport and Culture.

In November 2024, she was appointed to the Department of Health and Social Care.

== See also ==
- List of members of the House of Keys, 2016–2021
- List of members of the House of Keys, 2021–2026
