= Joney Faragher =

Manx politician and Leader of Manx Labour Party

Joney Faragher MHK

Member of the House of Keys for Douglas East
- Incumbent
- Assumed office 23 September 2021 Serving with Andrew Saunders

Leader of the Manx Labour Party
- Incumbent
- Assumed office 29 June 2021
- Deputy: Devon Watson
- Preceded by: David Cretney

Personal details
- Born: Douglas, Isle of Man
- Party: Labour
- Education: University of Liverpool; University of Sheffield; University of Chester / University College Isle of Man

Joney Faragher is a Manx politician who is the leader of the Manx Labour Party and, since 2021, a member of the House of Keys for the constituency of Douglas East.

== Early life and education ==
Faragher was born and raised in Douglas. She attended Ballacloan Infants' School, Fairfield Junior School and Ballakermeen High School. Faragher graduated with a Bachelor of Arts (BA) from the University of Liverpool and a Master of Arts (MA) from the University of Sheffield. She completed a PGCE in a partnership between the University of Chester and University College Isle of Man.

== Political History ==
Faragher was elected leader of the Manx Labour Party in June 2021 and was elected to represent Douglas East in the 2021 Manx general election. In Tynwald, she served as a departmental member for Health and Social Care from 2021 until 2024 and departmental member for Infrastructure from 2024 to 2026.

In 2024, she brought forward a Private Member's Bill to introduce free period products in public toilets. The Period Products (Free Provision) Act 2026 approved by Tynwald and was given Royal Assent in 2026.

She was re-elected in the 2026 Manx general election with a reduced share of the vote. She currently serves as the second Tynwald member on the Board of Culture Vannin.

== Elections ==
2021 Manx General Election: Douglas East
Party	Candidate	Votes	%
Manx Labour Party	Joney Faragher	741	23.87%
Independent	Clare Barber	692	22.29%
Liberal Vannin Party	Michael Josem	508	16.37%
Independent	John Joughin	477	15.37%
Independent	Peter Gilmore	313	10.08%
Independent	Amanda Walker	217	6.99%
Independent	Christine Urquhart	152	4.9%
Total valid votes		3100	
Rejected ballots		4	0.13%
Registered electors		4,891	
Turnout		1772	47.74%

2026 Manx General Election: Douglas East
Party	Candidate	Votes	%
Independent	Andrew Saunders	820	27.26%
Manx Labour Party	Joney Faragher	682	22.67%
Independent	Dave Mackay	632	21.01%
Independent	Clare Barber	543	18.05%
Change Isle of Man	Andrew Forster	331	11%
Total valid votes		3008	
Rejected ballots		4	0.13%
Registered electors		4,938	
Turnout		1700	34.43%
