= Paul Quine =

Manx politician and pilot

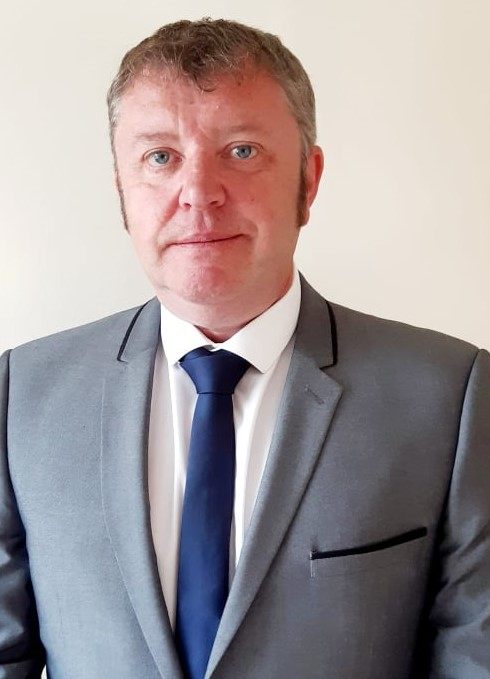

Member of the House of Keys for Douglas South
- In office 28 August 2020 – 12 August 2021
- Monarch: Queen Elizabeth II
- Lieutenant Governor: Richard Gozney

Personal details
- Born: 17 January 1969 (age 57) Douglas, Isle of Man
- Party: Independent
- Domestic partner: Karen Hardman
- Parent: Catherine (née Campbell). Colin Quine
- Education: British Aerospace Flying College
- Profession: Commercial Airline Pilot
- Known for: Pilot in Command of the final Manx Airlines flight.

Stephen Paul Quine (born 17 January 1969) is a Manx-born commercial pilot and former politician who, on 31 August 2002, was pilot in command of the final Manx Airlines flight. On 27 August 2020 he was elected as a Member of the House of Keys for the constituency of Douglas South in a by-election, before narrowly losing his seat at the subsequent General Election.

== Early life ==
Always known as Paul, Quine is the oldest of four children to Colin (born 21 June 1947; died 27 May 1991) and Catherine Quine (née Campbell) (born 17 September 1947). Paul Quine was born at the Jane Crookall Maternity Home on 17 January 1969 and was brought up in the Anagh Coar district of Douglas. His father was a businessman. Following his primary education, Quine attended Ballakermeen Junior High School and St Ninian's High School, representing both schools at football and cricket. During his youth he was an active member of the 2nd Douglas Cub Pack and Scout Troop in addition to which he played football for Pulrose United.

== Flying career ==
Quine's flying career commenced when he attained his Private Pilot's Licence at the Manx Flyers Aero Club, Ronaldsway Airport, Isle of Man. Showing an early aptitude for his vocation, Quine won the club's Student Pilot Trophy and after completion of his multi-engine rating and a brief spell working at the Manx Flyers Aero Club as a Flying Instructor, he continued with his commercial pilot's studies. He attended the British Aerospace Flying College at Prestwick Airport, and upon graduation joined BAC Express as a First Officer flying the Shorts SD-360.

=== Manx Airlines ===
Following his time at BAC Express, Quine joined Manx Airlines, this time as a Second Officer flying the British Aerospace ATP. Manx Airlines, which was then part of the British Regional Airlines Group, was undergoing a period of major expansion, and he rose rapidly through the ranks, achieving First Officer and Senior First Officer before attaining the rank of Captain. Upon gaining his command, he was posted to Manchester for twelve months. Returning to the Isle of Man, he continued to operate the BAe ATP until Manx Airlines ceased operations on 31 August 2002.

==== Manx Airlines last flight ====
Manx Airlines' last flight was planned to be flown by BAe 146 (G-MIMA), from Gatwick Airport to Ronaldsway. However, due to technical problems, a sub-chartered aircraft was brought in to operate this service. So the last Manx Airlines flight (JE 818 Birmingham International to Ronaldsway by ATP (G-MANB) on 31 August 2002) was captained by Quine. The BRAL Group was bought out for a figure in the region of £72 million by British Airways, and Manx Airlines ceased to exist.

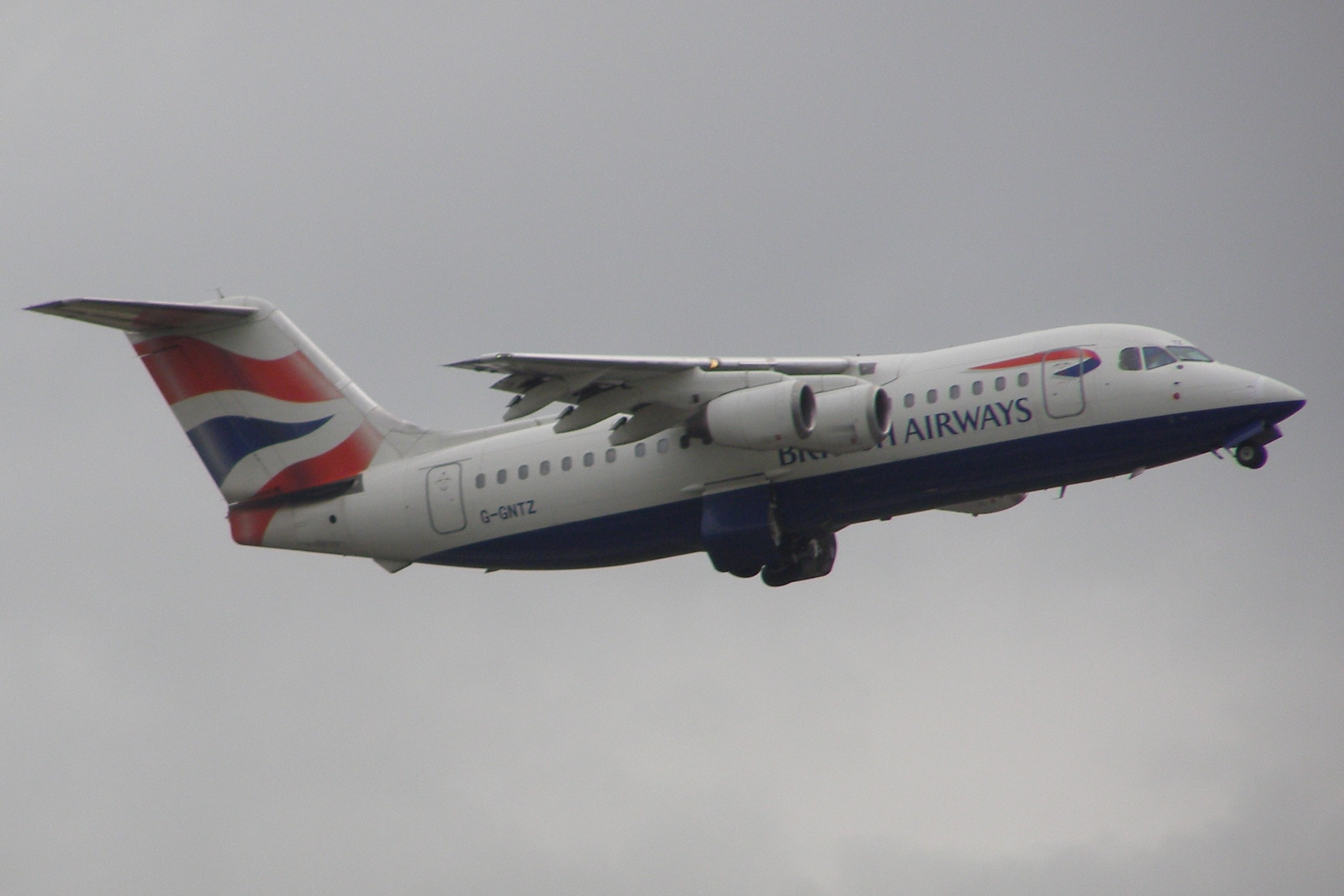
British Airways BAe 146 departing Manchester Airport

=== British Airways ===
After the acquisition, Quine found himself once more posted to Manchester Airport, this time to operate the Avro RJ100 for British Airways Citiexpress to various European destinations. Upon the re-organisation of British Airways' regional operations, he transferred fleets to take command of the Dash-8 Q-300 and continued to operate from Manchester.

=== Flybe ===
On 3 November 2006, British Airways chief executive Willie Walsh said that BA had reached an agreement for Flybe to acquire their regional subsidiary, BA Connect. Flybe assumed the majority of the British Airways routes operated by BA Connect, and introduced the Dash-8 Q-400 onto these routes. Quine was amongst the first of the ex-BA Connect pilots to undergo the conversion course onto the new aircraft type at Farnborough Aerodrome, Hampshire. As Flybe continued to re-organise the route structure which it had inherited, Quine was posted back to the Isle of Man.

Flybe was further restructured in 2014, and its Isle of Man base was closed. Quine was posted to Flybe's base at Belfast City Airport, from where he operated for 14 months. In summer 2015, he was again posted to Manchester, from where he continued to operate the Dash-8 Q-400 on various Flybe routes until the Isle of Man base reopened in 2019. Quine remained based on the Isle of Man until Flybe went into administration on 5 March 2020. During his time with Flybe, Quine served on the Company Council of the British Airline Pilots' Association.

=== Loganair ===
Following his time in politics Quine resumed his career in commercial aviation, joining Loganair in March 2022. He currently operates the ATR-72 based at Ronaldsway Airport, Isle of Man.

== Politics ==
Quine was one of ten people nominated in July 2020 to fill the two vacant seats in the House of Keys in the constituency of Douglas South – the largest number ever to contest a Keys by-election. The by-election took place on 27 August 2020. After two recounts, Quine came second in the poll, securing one of the two seats.

Despite almost trebling his vote at the 2021 Manx general election, Quine narrowly lost his seat in the Douglas South constituency.

== Election results ==
=== 2020 ===
2020 By-Election: Douglas South
Party	Candidate	Votes	%
Independent	Claire Christian	930	33.76%
Independent	Stephen Quine	469	30.97%
Liberal Vannin	Michael Josem	463	25.88%
Isle of Man Green Party	Andrew Jessop	342	19.12%
Independent	Pamela Malarkey	337	18.84%
Independent	Anthony Allen	264	14.76%
Independent	David Fowler	139	7.77%
Independent	Kevin Oliphant-Smith	132	7.38%
Independent	Iam Clanton	115	6.43%
Independent	Lon Pinkerton	84	4.7%
Total valid votes		1789	
Rejected ballots		5	0.28%
Registered electors		4,759	
Turnout		1794	37.7%

== Personal life ==
Paul Quine has three sisters. His partner, Karen Hardman, is the daughter of the former sidecar racer and Isle of Man TT winner, Colin Hardman. They live together on Bray Hill, Douglas, Isle of Man. He is an avid supporter of Liverpool FC, FC Isle of Man and Dundalk Football Club.

== See also ==
- Manx Airlines
- BA Connect
- British Airways
