= Rob Callister =

Manx politician

Rob Callister MHK

Minister for Housing and Communities
- Incumbent
- Assumed office 30 October 2026

Member of the House of Keys for Onchan
- Incumbent
- Assumed office 22 September 2016 Serving with Rachel Glover MHK

Personal details
- Born: Isle of Man
- Party: Independent
- Education: Isle of Man College
- Website: robcallister.im

Robert Edward Callister is a Manx politician. He has been a member of the House of Keys (MHK) for Onchan since 2016 and Minister for Housing and Communities since 2026.

== Career ==
He was elected in the 2016 Manx general election and re-elected in the 2021 Manx general election. In 2022, he served as health minister. He was in the role for seven weeks. He formally apologised for breach of standards.

In 2023 he was appointed to replace David Ashford as head of the Isle of Man planning committee. In 2024, he was appointed Chair of the Public Services Commission and Vice Chair of the Public Sector Pensions Authority.

Callister was reelected as an MHK for Onchan in the 2026 General Election, coming second to Rachel Glover. Following the election, he announced his candidacy for Chief Minister however withdrew ahead of the nomination period closing due to a 'lack of support'. In October 2026, he was appointed to the newly created position of Minister for Housing and Communities by Chief Minister Chris Thomas.

== Election results ==
2016 Manx General Election: Onchan
Party	Candidate	Votes	%
Independent	Rob Callister	1272	51.98%
Independent	Julie Edge	1272	51.98%
Independent	Timothy Craig	841	34.37%
Independent	David Quirk	822	33.59%
Independent	Anthony Allen	510	20.84%
Total valid votes		4398	
Rejected ballots		11	0.21%
Registered electors		4,997	
Turnout		2307	48.97%

2021 Manx General Election: Onchan
Party	Candidate	Votes	%
Independent	Rob Callister	1600	68.52%
Independent	Julie Edge	1363	58.37%
Independent	James Cherry	570	24.41%
Independent	John Michael Leather	177	7.58%
Independent	Peter Willers	433	18.54%
Total valid votes		4143	
Rejected ballots		11	0.19%
Registered electors		5,200	
Turnout		2307	44.9%

2026 Manx General Election: Onchan
Party	Candidate	Votes	%
Independent	Rachel Glover	1245	47.56%
Independent	Rob Callister	1103	42.13%
Independent	Julie Edge	866	33.08%
Liberal Vannin Party	Peter Karran	738	28.19%
Independent	Gabriella Corkish	725	27.69%
Independent	Oliver Lockwood	50	1.91%
Total valid votes		4737	
Rejected ballots		11	0.2%
Registered electors		5,069	
Turnout		2307	51.65%

== See also ==
- List of members of the House of Keys, 2016–2021
- List of members of the House of Keys, 2021–2026
