= Adrian Earnshaw =

Manx politician (1950–2022)

- Born: Adrian John Earnshaw; 19 January 1950; Isle of Man
- Died: 14 January 2022 (aged 71)
- Occupation: Politician
- Years active: 2001–2022
- Employer(s): Isle of Man Bank (1968–2001); Isle of Man Government (2001–2022)
- Spouse: Norma Cain
- Children: 2

Adrian John Earnshaw MHK (19 January 1950 – 14 January 2022) was a Manx politician who served as the Minister of Home Affairs in the Isle of Man Government and a Member of the House of Keys for Onchan.

== Life and career ==
Born on 19 January 1950, Earnshaw lived in Onchan all his life. He was educated at Onchan Primary School and Douglas High School, he worked at Isle of Man Bank from 1968 until his election in 2001 as MHK for Onchan. He had previously served as an Onchan Commissioner.

In December 2006, Earnshaw was appointed Minister of Tourism and in 2008 was moved to Home Affairs Minister by Chief Minister Tony Brown.

Earnshaw lost his seat in the 2011 Manx general election, when he was defeated by Liberal Vannin challenger Zac Hall.

== Governmental positions ==
- Minister of Tourism and Leisure, 2006–08
- Minister of Home Affairs, 2008–11
