= Tim Johnston (politician) =

Manx politician

Minister for Enterprise
- In office 14 February 2023 – 24 September 2026
- Chief Minister: Alfred Cannan
- Preceded by: Lawrie Hooper
- Succeeded by: Robert Cowell

Chair of the Manx Utilities Authority
- In office 4 October 2022 – 7 March 2023
- Preceded by: Rob Callister
- Succeeded by: Tim Crookall

Member of the House of Keys for Ayre and Michael
- In office 23 September 2021 – 24 September 2026

President of the Manx National Farmers Union
- In office 4 December 2019 – 23 September 2021
- Preceded by: Brian Brumby
- Succeeded by: Ean Parsons

Personal details
- Born: Timothy David Johnston; 1971 or 1972 (age 54–55)
- Party: Independent
- Spouse: Maria Johnston
- Children: 2
- Education: Royal Agricultural College

Timothy David Johnston is a Manx politician and former dairy farmer who served as Minister for Enterprise from 2023 to 2026. He was elected as an independent Member of the House of Keys (MHK) for Ayre & Michael in the 2021 Manx general election.

== Early life and career ==
Johnston was educated on the Isle of Man. He received a degree in rural estate management from the Royal Agricultural College in Cirencester in 1994. From 1998 to 2018, he managed a dairy farm in Andreas during which he served as a director on the board of the Isle of Man Creamery for three years. He also started his own crop farming business. On 4 December 2019, Johnston was elected to succeed Brian Brumby as president of the Manx National Farmers Union (MNFU). Ean Parsons, a beef and lamb farmer from Laxey, was elected as his vice president.

== Political career ==
On 2 June 2021, Johnston stated he would be running for Ayre & Michael in the 2021 Manx general election. He stated in his election manifesto that he was making a "clear commitment" not to become a minister if elected intending only to work as departmental member so that he could "build trust" and be an "approachable, accountable Member of the House of Keys". Johnston was elected as one of two Members of the House of Keys receiving 1,203 votes alongside incumbent Minister for the Treasury Alfred Cannan who received 2,117 votes whilst incumbent Minister for Infrastructure Tim Baker was defeated. Johnston stepped down as president of the MNFU and Parsons was elected to succeed him.

Johnston joined the Department for Enterprise in October 2021 as a departmental member. He was appointed as chair of the Manx Utilities Authority on 4 October 2022. On 14 February 2023, Johnston was appointed Minister for Enterprise. He defended his decision to become a minister, despite pledging not to, stating he wanted to "bring stability and experience" as the position had been held by five different MHKs in the previous 16 months. He added that he could not have taken any other cabinet position due to him only having experience in the Department for Enterprise. Johnston remained as chair of the Manx Utilities Authority until his successor Tim Crookall was chosen on 7 March 2023.

In October 2023, Johnston revoked Cube International's government contract as the official Isle of Man TT merchandise supplier for the 2024 TT as they had failed to "fulfil their required financial obligations" according to him. In April 2024, Johnston extended Auto-Cycle Union Events Ltd's contract as organisers of the Isle of Man TT until the end of the 2033 TT.

Johnston lost his seat at the 2026 Manx general election.

== Personal life ==
He has lived in Sulby since 2019 and has two children with his wife Maria.

== Electoral history ==
2021 general election: Ayre & Michael
Party	Candidate	Votes	
Party	Candidate	Count	Of total (%)
Independent	Alfred Cannan	2,117	36.4
Independent	Tim Johnston	1,203	20.7
Independent	Tim Baker	709	12.2
Liberal Vannin	Paul Weatherall	540	9.3
Independent	Duncan Livingstone	517	8.9
Independent	Phil Corkill	378	6.5
Independent	Dr Sos Boussougou	189	3.2
Independent	Madeleine Westall	168	2.9
Total votes		5,821	
Registered electors		5,127	
