= Bill Malarkey (politician) =

Manx politician (1951–2020)

Bill Malarkey MHK

Member of the House of Keys for Douglas South
- In office 2015–2020 Serving with Kate Beecroft
- Preceded by: David Cretney
- In office 2006–2011 Serving with David Cretney
- Preceded by: Adrian Duggan
- Succeeded by: Kate Beecroft

Personal details
- Born: William Mackay Malarkey; 18 June 1951 Douglas, Isle of Man
- Died: 20 February 2020 (aged 68) Isle of Man
- Party: Independent
- Children: 3

William Mackay Malarkey (18 June 1951– 20 February 2020) was a Manx politician, who was elected Liberal Vannin MHK for Douglas South but later defected from the party and sat as an independent. In the 2011 general election he lost his seat to Liberal Vannin candidate Kate Beecroft. He was re-elected at a by-election in May 2015 as an independent candidate, and retained his seat for Douglas South in September 2016.

Bill Malarkey died on 20 February 2020. He had been suffering from cancer for some time.

== Early life ==
Born in Douglas, Malarkey attended Ballakermeen High School and St Ninian's High School. He graduated from the Isle of Man College of Further Education and qualified as an electrical engineer at City and Guilds of London Institute.

== Career ==
At the 2006 Manx general election, Malarkey was elected as the Liberal Vannin Party Member of the House of Keys for Douglas South, alongside David Cretney who was elected for the Manx Labour Party. Malarkey was one of only two Liberal Vannin MHKs elected in 2006, the other being Peter Karran, the party Leader.

At the 2011 Manx general election, Malarkey contested Douglas South as an independent, opposing both Cretney and the official Liberal Vannin Party candidate, Kate Beecroft. Malarkey was narrowly defeated and was not elected.

Following Cretney's election to the Legislative Council in mid-2015, Malarkey contested the ensuing by-election in Douglas South, winning as an independent.

Malarkey was re-elected for Douglas South in the 2016 General Election and was appointed Minister for Home Affairs.
