= Andrew Smith (Manx politician) =

Manx politician

Andrew Smith MHK

Member of the House of Keys for Garff
- Incumbent
- Assumed office 23 September 2021 Serving with Daphne Caine

Personal details
- Political party: Independent
- Website: andrewsmith.im

Andrew Joseph Smith is a Manx politician. He has been a member of the House of Keys (MHK) for Garff since 2021.

== Career ==
Smith is a former accountant and businessman. He has worked in the Isle of Man civil service.

Smith was a candidate in the 2016 Manx general election and the 1995 by-election. He was elected in the 2021 Manx general election.

== See also ==
- List of members of the House of Keys, 2021–2026
