= Ann Corlett =

Manx politician

Ann Corlett MHK

Member of the House of Keys for Douglas Central
- In office 22 September 2016 – 24 September 2026

Personal details
- Born: Catherine Ann Corkish c. 1959/1960 Douglas, Isle of Man
- Party: Independent

Catherine Ann Corlett (née Corkish; born c. 1959/1960) is a Manx politician.

== Early life ==
Corlett was born in Douglas to Bill and Glenda Corkish, who both served as Mayor of Douglas. She attended Tynwald Street School, Ballakermeen High School, Park Road School and St Ninian's High School.

== Career ==
She was re-elected in the 2021 Manx general election. In February 2024, she was elected deputy speaker for the House of Keys.

== Personal life ==
Corlett is the mother of three children.

== See also ==
- List of members of the House of Keys, 2016–2021
- List of members of the House of Keys, 2021–2026
