= Department of Home Affairs (Isle of Man) =

Governmental department of the Isle of Man

Department overview
- Formed: 20 January 1987
- Preceding Department: Home Affairs Board
- Jurisdiction: Isle of Man
- Headquarters: Tromode Road, Douglas, Isle of Man, IM2 5PA
- Employees: 565
- Minister responsible: Jane Poole-Wilson MHK, Minister for Justice and Home Affairs
- Department executive: Dan Davies, Chief Executive Officer
- Website: www.gov.im/dha

The Department of Home Affairs (Manx: Rheynn Cooishyn Sthie) ensures the safety, protection and security of the Isle of Man.

The Department is responsible for the Isle of Man Constabulary, the Isle of Man Fire and Rescue Service, the Prison and Probation Service, emergency planning and Civil Defence.

The current Minister for Justice and Home Affairs is Jane Poole-Wilson MHK.

== Function ==
- Isle of Man Constabulary
- Isle of Man Fire and Rescue Service
- Prison and Probation Service
- Emergency Planning and Civil Defence
- Emergency Services Joint Control Room

=== Agencies reporting to the Department of Home Affairs ===
- Communications Commission

== Current and previous Ministers and Chairs ==
=== Minister for Home Affairs (Minister for Justice and Home Affairs with effect from 1 December 2020) ===
- Hon. Jane Poole-Wilson MHK, from October 2021
- Hon. Graham Cregeen MHK, 3 March 2020 – October 2021
- Hon. David Ashford MHK, 21 February 2020 – 2 March 2020
- Hon. Bill Malarkey MHK, 7 October 2016 – 20 February 2020
- Hon. John Shimmin MHK, 28 September 2016 – 6 October 2016
- Hon. Juan Watterson MHK, 13 September 2012 – 27 September 2016
- Hon. John Shimmin MHK, 3 September 2012 - 12 September 2012
- Hon. Juan Watterson MHK, 14 October 2011 - 2 September 2012
- Hon. Adrian Earnshaw MHK, 11 August 2008 - 13 October 2011
- Hon. Martyn Quayle MHK, 15 December 2006 - 10 August 2008
- Hon. John Shimmin MHK, 1 August 2005 - 14 December 2006
- Hon. Phil Braidwood MHK, 6 December 2001 - 31 July 2005
- Hon. Allan Bell MHK, 6 December 1996 - 5 December 2001
- Hon. Richard Corkill MHK, 13 March 1995 - 5 December 1996
- Hon. Arnold Callin MLC, 18 December 1991 - 12 March 1995
- Hon. Edmund Lowey MLC, 16 December 1986 - 17 December 1991

=== Chair of the Home Affairs Board ===
- Noel Cringle, 1982-1986
- Ian Anderson, 1981-1982
