= Martyn Quayle =

Manx politician (1959–2016)

George Martyn Quayle, MHK (6 February 1959 – 26 August 2016) was a Manx politician who previously held the position of Minister of Tourism and Leisure in the Isle of Man Government and represented Middle in the House of Keys. He served as minister of the Department of Social Care.

Martyn Quayle was born on the Isle of Man, the son of George Douglas Quayle and Elaine Evelyn Corrin. He was educated at St Ninian's High School and Ballakermeen High School before joining the Civil Service. He then joined Isle of Man Farmers Ltd, rising to Company Secretary and Managing Director between 1986 and 2002.

In the 2001 general election he was elected MHK for Middle at his first attempt and he retained his seat in the 2006 general election. In December 2006, he was appointed Home Affairs Minister before being moved in 2008 to Tourism by Tony Brown. He was later moved to the Department of Social Care.

He lost his seat in the September 2011 general election, when he was defeated by Independent farmer Howard Quayle (no relation).

Quayle died in a Liverpool hospital on 26 August 2016 from injuries sustained in a fall two weeks earlier.

== Governmental positions ==
- Minister of Tourism and Leisure, 2008–2011
- Minister of Home Affairs, 2006–2008
- Chairman of the Isle of Man Water Authority, 2004–2006
