= Jane Poole-Wilson =

Manx solicitor and politician

The Honourable Jane Poole Wilson MHK

Minister for Justice and Home Affairs
- Incumbent
- Assumed office 18 October 2021
- Chief Minister: Alfred Cannan and Chris Thomas
- Preceded by: Graham Cregeen

Member of the House of Keys for Middle
- Incumbent
- Assumed office 23 September 2021 Serving with James Cochrane

Member of the Legislative Council
- In office 18 May 2017 – 23 September 2021

Personal details
- Born: Douglas
- Party: Independent
- Education: Ballakermeen High School
- Alma mater: St Catherine's College, Oxford

Jane Pearl Poole-Wilson, MHK (née Kissack) is a Manx politician and solicitor. She was elected to the Legislative Council of the Isle of Man (the upper branch of Tynwald) in 2017 to fill a casual vacancy and was re-elected for a full five-year term in 2018.

She was elected to the House of Keys for the constituency of Middle in the 2021 Manx general election and upon election resigned her seat on the Legislative Council. She was appointed Minister for Justice and Home Affairs and Deputy Chief Minister by Chief Minister Alfred Cannan. Following the 2026 Manx General Election, she was reappointed Minister for Justice and Home Affairs by Chief Minister Chris Thomas.

== Early life and family ==
Poole-Wilson attended Ballakermeen High School before studying Modern History at St Catherine's College, Oxford, graduating with a Bachelor of Arts degree. She then spent two years at Chester College of Law and secured a training contract at Eversheds, leading to her qualifying as a solicitor. As of 2017, she is married with two children.

== Career ==
As a solicitor, Poole-Wilson specialised in employment law. She worked for Eversheds and was seconded to the UK Financial Services Authority, before joining Simmons and Simmons. She became the principal in-house lawyer at UBS Investment Bank advising on human resources matters for Europe, the Middle East and Africa. She moved to the Isle of Man in 2005 and began working for a consultancy firm providing support for multinational corporations. She was Isle of Man Legal Aid Deputy Certifying Officer from 2007 to 2012.

=== Politics ===
Poole-Wilson stood for election to the Legislative Council as an Independent in May 2017, following the resignation of Tony Wild; she was nominated by Daphne Caine and seconded by Bill Shimmins. She was elected, receiving 14 votes. Following her election she served as Chair of the Standing Committee on Constitutional and Legal Affairs and Justice, a member of the Select Committee of Tynwald on Library Provision and an Equality Champion. Her term expired in February 2018. In March 2018 she was re-elected to the Legislative Council for a full term with 22 votes.
