= Geoff Corkish =

Manx politician (1953–2025)

Geoff Corkish MBE
- Corkish in 2006

Member of the Legislative Council
- In office May 2013 – February 2018

Member of the House of Keys
- In office November 2006 – May 2013
- Constituency: Douglas West

Personal details
- Born: Charles Geoffrey Corkish; 25 May 1953
- Died: 8 September 2025 (aged 72)
- Party: Independent
- Spouse: Muriel Curphy (m. 1976)
- Children: 2
- Occupation: Politician
- Committees: Department of Tourism and Leisure; Department of Trade and Industry

Charles Geoffrey Corkish MBE (25 May 1953 – 8 September 2025) was a Manx politician, who was a Member of the House of Keys for Douglas West. He was elected at the 2006 general election, topping the polls beating Home Affairs Minister and Chief Minister candidate John Shimmin and former MHK Geoff Cannell.

== Early life and career ==
Born on 25 May 1953 to William Douglas Corkish and Margaret Elizabeth Corkish (née Cringle), he was educated at Pulrose Infants School, Demesne Road School and Douglas High School for Boys. He later went on to work for the Isle of Man Steam Packet Company from 1969 to 2006, becoming communications director. He was also the Chairman of the Arts Council and his interests included singing.

He was a member of the Department of Tourism and Leisure and the Department of Trade and Industry.

He was elevated to the Legislative Council, after having been elected on 18 May 2013 in the first round.

Corkish retired as of February 2018.

== Personal life and death ==
Corkish was married to Muriel (née Curphy) from 1976, they had two children and one granddaughter, Gabriella, who was elected as an Onchan Commissioner in the 2025 Manx local elections, becoming the youngest local authority member on the Isle of Man. Corkish also held freemasonry membership.

He was appointed a Member of the Order of the British Empire in the 2007 New Year Honours for services to the community in the Isle of Man.

Corkish died of cancer on 8 September 2025, at the age of 72.
