= Kate Costain =

Manx politician

Kate Costain MHK

Leader of the Liberal Vannin Party
- Incumbent
- Assumed office February 2014
- Preceded by: Peter Karran

Member of the House of Keys for Douglas South
- In office 2011–2020
- Leader: Peter Karran (until 2014)
- Preceded by: Bill Malarkey

Personal details
- Born: Kathleen Joan Costain Isle of Man
- Party: Liberal Vannin Party
- Spouse: Anthony Beecroft (m. 2005–2019)
- Children: 1

Kathleen Joan Costain is a Manx politician who is a former Leader of the Liberal Vannin Party and was a Member of the House of Keys for Douglas South from 2011 to 2020.

She was Kathleen Beecroft until her divorce in 2019, after which she reverted to her maiden name Costain.

== Early life ==
Kathleen Joan Costain was the fourth of five children born to parents Joan and Norman Costain. The family lived at Ballafletcher farm in Tromode. Costain received her qualifications through night school.

== Career ==
Costain worked as an accountant before entering politics.

She stood unsuccessfully for the Liberal Vannin Party in Middle in the 2006 Manx general election but later became a Braddan Commissioner from 2007 to 2011. Beecroft served as Chairman of the Liberal Vannin Party from 2008 to 2009. She stood unsuccessfully again in Douglas East in a by-election in 2010, coming second and only seven votes behind Chris Robertshaw who won.

In the 2011 Manx general election Beecroft was elected for the Liberal Vannin Party in Douglas South, becoming one of three Liberal Vannin MHKs.

In February 2014, Peter Karran, the Leader of the Liberal Vannin Party, renounced his leadership in favour of Beecroft. Karran said that it "was time for a change." She once revealed aspirations to bring more women into the House of Keys and to field a Liberal Vannin candidate in every constituency in the 2016 Manx general election. At the 2016 election Liberal Vannin initially fielded only 4 candidates in the 12 constituencies, with one of those resigning from the party on the day of the election.

Beecroft was Minister for Health and Social Care from 2016 until 2018. She was asked by the Chief Minister to resign as minister in January 2018 in controversial circumstances after two political members had resigned from her Department in 2017 and one LibVan MHK had resigned from the party.

She resigned as an MHK in July 2020.

== Personal life ==
Costain married Anthony Beecroft in 2005; they separated in 2019. Costain has one son from a previous relationship.

== Electoral performance ==
House of Keys elections

Date of election	Constituency	Party	Votes	% of votes	Result
2006 general election	Middle	Liberal Vannin Party	548	28.5	Not elected
2010 by-election	Douglas East	Liberal Vannin Party	381	25.3	Not elected
2011 general election	Douglas South	Liberal Vannin Party	1,191	29.5	Elected
2016 general election	Douglas South	Liberal Vannin Party	1,134	36.0	Elected
