= Peter Karran =

Manx politician (born 1960)

Peter Karran MHK

Leader of the Liberal Vannin Party
- In office 2006 – February 2014
- Preceded by: New position
- Succeeded by: Kate Beecroft

Member of the House of Keys for Onchan
- In office 1985–2016
- Succeeded by: Rob Callister, Julie Edge

Member of the House of Keys for Middle
- In office 1985–1986
- Preceded by: Roger Alan Payne
- Succeeded by: Brian Barton

Minister for Education and Children
- In office 2011–2012
- Preceded by: Eddie Teare
- Succeeded by: Tim Crookall

Chairman of the Isle of Man Water Authority
- In office 1990–2003
- Preceded by: Adrian Duggan
- Succeeded by: David Cannan

Personal details
- Born: 20 May 1960 (age 66) Isle of Man
- Party: Manx Labour Party (1981–2004); Liberal Vannin Party (2006–present)

Peter Karran (born 20 May 1960) is a Manx politician, who is a former leader of the Liberal Vannin Party and former Minister of Education and Children. He was a Member of the House of Keys for Middle, and then for Onchan, from 1985 to 2016.

He was a member of the Manx Labour Party from 1981 but left in 2004. In August 2006 he founded the Liberal Vannin Party and became its first leader.

== Career ==
Karran worked as a joiner. He stood for election in Middle in the 1981 Manx general election but was not elected. In 1985 he contested a by-election in Middle and was elected, becoming the youngest ever elected Member in the House of Keys. In the 1986 general election, Karran contested Onchan and was elected. He repeated his success in Onchan in general elections in 1986, 1991, 1996, 2001, 2006 and 2011. He has been very popular ever since, topping the Onchan polls at most elections. (In 2006 he received more votes than any other candidate for the Keys: partly because Onchan was one of the few three-seat constituencies and so there were more votes available.)

He was a Manx Labour Party member (and one of their two MHKs) but left the party in 2004. In August 2006 he founded the Liberal Vannin Party (LVP) and became its first leader. From 2011 to 2012 Karran served as the Minister of Education and Children under Allan Bell; however he was removed from the position for opposing the position of the Council of Ministers on the film industry.

In February 2014, Karran renounced the leadership of the LVP in favour of Kate Beecroft MHK. Karran said that it "was time for a change".

Around April 2016, Karran announced he would be standing down from the Keys after 31 years in Manx politics.

In August 2026, Karran announced he would be making a return to Manx politics and stood in the 2026 Manx General Election as a candidate for Onchan.

== Controversy ==
Karran has been highly critical of the Manx Government, for example about Mount Murray gate. He was criticised by many people on the island when he announced the closure of all of the island's government-run preschools. His election campaign was based around the protection of frontline services in the Isle of Man, and the school closures were seen as a direct contradiction to that.

== Electoral performance ==
Karran contested several elections, first for the Manx Labour Party and later for the Liberal Vannin Party.

=== House of Keys elections ===
Date of election	Constituency	Party	Votes	% of votes	Result
1981 general election	Middle	Manx Labour Party	?	?	Not elected
1985 by-election	Middle	Manx Labour Party	?	?	Elected
1986 general election	Onchan	Manx Labour Party	1,075	28.1	Elected
1991 general election	Onchan	Manx Labour Party	1,195	29.1	Elected
1996 general election	Onchan	Manx Labour Party	2,257	23.7	Elected
2001 general election	Onchan	Manx Labour Party	2,305	22.8	Elected
2006 general election	Onchan	Liberal Vannin Party	2,600	28.1	Elected
2011 general election	Onchan	Liberal Vannin Party	2,074	21.9	Elected

Note: Throughout the relevant period the Onchan constituency elected three MHKs and each elector was entitled to three votes. Thus for example achieving 28.1% of the vote might mean that anything up to 84.3% of the electors may have voted for him.
