= Michelle Haywood =

Manx politician

Michelle Haywood MHK

Member of the House of Keys for Rushen
- In office 23 September 2021 – 24 September 2026

Personal details
- Party: Independent

Michelle Elena Kay Haywood is a Manx politician.

== Biography ==
Michelle Haywood trained as a research scientist and has had a career in education as both a teacher and a lecturer at Isle of Man College, before becoming the Director of Irish Sea Diving and Marine Services. Prior to her election to the House of Keys, she held the post of Chair of Port St Mary Commissioners.

She was elected to the House of Keys for the constituency of Rushen in the 2021 Manx general election. She was one of ten women elected. In November 2024, Haywood was named the new infrastructure minister. On 12 May 2025, she announced that driving licences in the Isle of Man would go digital from July 2025.

== See also ==
- List of members of the House of Keys, 2021–2026
