= Geoffrey Boot =

Manx politician

The Much Honoured Geoffrey Boot Baron of Waughton MHK

Minister for Environment, Food and Agriculture
- In office 4 October 2016 – 12 August 2021
- Chief Minister: Howard Quayle
- Preceded by: Richard Ronan
- Succeeded by: Clare Barber

Member of the House of Keys for Glenfaba and Peel
- In office 22 September 2016 – 12 August 2021

Member of the House of Keys for Glenfaba
- In office 11 September 2015 – 21 September 2016
- Succeeded by: Constituency Abolished

Personal details
- Born: Geoffrey George Boot; 1953 (age 72–73) Nottingham, United Kingdom
- Party: Independent
- Other political affiliations: Conservative
- Spouse(s): Suzie Boot, Lady Waughton
- Children: 4

Geoffrey George Boot, Baron of Waughton (born 1953) is an English-born politician who until 2021 served as a Member of the House of Keys for Glenfaba and Peel. Before moving to the Isle of Man, Boot also served as a Conservative Councillor and Mayor for Sandgate in Kent.

== Early life ==
Geoffrey George Boot was born in Nottingham in 1953 and was educated in Sussex Coast College Hastings. Boot's time at college was cut short by a serious motorsport accident which left him hospitalised and forced him to leave further education.

After the accident, Boot began his working career at Midland Bank before moving into surveying and estate agency work. Boot also operated a large soft fruit farm as well as holiday, golf and leisure facilities.

== UK political career ==
Prior to his election into the House of Keys, Boot was a Conservative Party councillor in the parish of Sandgate, Kent, where he served four years as chairman and for three months was their only mayor. He and his wife Suzie unsuccessfully stood in the 2007 Shepway District Council election for the Folkestone Cheriton ward.

== Manx political career ==
He contested the House of Keys seat of Glenfaba in both the 2006 and 2011 Manx general elections, but the seat was retained by his opponent David Anderson in both elections. From 2012 to 2015 Boot served as a Commissioner for the parish of German.

He stood in a 2015 by-election triggered by Anderson's promotion to the Legislative Council of the Isle of Man. and won the election with 424 votes. His victory by three votes was described by the Mansfield and Ashfield Chad as "the closest Manx election result since 1929". In Tynwald, Boot sat on the Social Affairs Policy Review Committee, Select Committee of Tynwald on the Registration of Property and served as political member of the Department of Economic Development and the Department of Environment, Food and Agriculture.

In the 2016 Manx General Election, the constituency of Glenfaba was merged with the neighbouring constituency of Peel. Boot was returned with an increased vote count along with former Peel MHK Ray Harmer, who topped the poll. In October 2016 he was chosen by Howard Quayle to serve as Minister for Environment, Food and Agriculture.

From 2017 to 2018, Boot sat on the Select Committee on the Functioning of Tynwald.

As Minister, Boot held responsibility for legislation and regulation relating to the island's farming and fishing industries as well as environmental and biodiversity policy and the protection and management of the island's national glens, territorial seas and reserves. In 2020 Boot was responsible for taking the Climate Change Act through Tynwald, which set out the Isle of Man Government's approach to mitigating the effects of climate change and its commitment to reducing net carbon emissions to zero by 2050.

In May 2021, Boot stated that he intended to stand as a candidate in the 2021 Manx General Election.

But in June 2021, Boot shouted at women (whilst campaigning for election) from Ireland telling her to go back to Ireland which spark outrage in the community.

Boot stood for re-election for Glenfaba and Peel at the 2021 general election, but was not elected: he came in sixth place with less than 4% of the votes cast.

== United Kingdom electoral results ==
=== Local elections in the United Kingdom ===
Date of election	Constituency	Party	Votes	% of votes	Result	Ref
2003 Shepway District Council election	Folkestone Cheriton	Conservative	216	15.5	Not elected	
2007 Shepway District Council election	Folkestone Cheriton	Conservative	433	28.8	Not elected	

== Electoral results ==
=== 2006 ===
2006 Manx General Election: Glenfaba
Party	Candidate	Votes	%
Independent	David Anderson	760	58.96%
Independent	Geoffrey Boot	529	41.04%
Total valid votes		1289	
Rejected ballots		13	1%
Registered electors		1,733	
Turnout		1302	75.13%

=== 2011 ===
2011 Manx General Election: Glenfaba
Party	Candidate	Votes	%
Independent	David Anderson	649	46.52%
Independent	Geoffrey Boot	557	39.93%
Independent	Matthew Wadsworth	189	13.55%
Total valid votes		1395	
Rejected ballots		11	0.78%
Registered electors		2,016	
Turnout		1406	69.74%

=== 2015 ===
2015 By-Election: Glenfaba
Party	Candidate	Votes	%
Independent	Geoffrey Boot	424	50.18%
Independent	David Talbot	421	49.82%
Total valid votes		845	
Rejected ballots		7	0.71%
Turnout		845	33.27%

=== 2016 ===
2016 Manx General Election: Glenfaba and Peel
Party	Candidate	Votes	%
Independent	Raymond Harmer	2195	41.91%
Independent	Geoffrey Boot	1805	34.46%
Independent	Leslie Hanson	1238	23.63%
Total valid votes		5238	
Rejected ballots		24	0.73%
Registered electors		5,886	
Turnout		3309	56.22%

=== 2021 ===
Glenfaba & Peel
Party	Candidate	Votes	
Party	Candidate	Count	Of total (%)
Independent	Kate Lord-Brennan	2,150	30.9
Independent	Tim Crookall	1,134	19.3
Independent	Ray Harmer	1,073	15.4
Independent	Trevor Cowin	1,070	15.4
Green	Leo Cussons	855	12.3
Independent	Geoffrey Boot	273	3.9
Independent	Mikey Lee	201	2.9
Total votes		6,756	191.4
Total ballots		3,639	
Rejected ballots		6	
Turnout		3,645	57.1
Registered electors		6,380	

== Personal life ==
Boot has four children with his wife Suzie. The baron and baroness own a number of properties including Sandgate Castle, a Device Fort in Sandgate, Kent. which is now used by his property investment company, AMT South Eastern Ltd.

He is a commercial pilot and a chief flying instructor. He won the King's Cup Race three times and was a co-founder of FLYER magazine. In 2016, Boot announced that he would be downsizing his commitments.

On the 18 March 1999 he succeeded as a minor Scottish baron, with the title of Baron of Waughton. The title was announced in the Gazette as a matter of public record by the Court of the Lord Lyon who represents the crown in Scotland. Boot is related to the family associated with the Boots pharmaceutical chain.

Baronage of Scotland
Preceded by his father	Baron of Waughton; 1998-present	Succeeded by heir unknown
