= Sarah Maltby =

Manx politician

Sarah Maltby MHK

Minister for Education, Sport and Culture
- Incumbent
- Assumed office 16 October 2026
- Chief Minister: Chris Thomas
- Preceded by: Daphne Caine

Member of the House of Keys for Douglas South
- Incumbent
- Assumed office 23 September 2021

Personal details
- Born: Douglas, Isle of Man
- Party: Manx Labour Party
- Education: University of Chester

Sarah Louise Maltby is a Manx politician. In 2026, she was appointed Minister for Education, Sport and Culture.

== Early life ==
Maltby was born in Douglas. She attended Scoill Vallajeelt and Ballakermeen High School. Maltby graduated from the University of Chester in 2006.

== Career ==
Maltby worked as a Senior Education Support Officer at Ballakermeen High School and for Crossroads IOM with adults with complex disabilities.

Maltby was elected to the House of Keys in September 2021, when she was the Chair of the Manx Labour Party. She was appointed chairman of the Isle of Man Arts Council in 2024.

== See also ==
- List of members of the House of Keys, 2021–2026
