= Michael Crowe (politician) =

Politician from the Isle of Man

Michael Crowe MHK

Member of the House of Keys for Rushen

Minister for the Treasury

Personal details
- Party: Independent
- Cabinet: Council of Ministers

Michael Crowe is a politician from the Isle of Man. He is currently the Minister for Treasury.
