= Stu Peters =

Manx politician

Stu Peters MHK

Member of the House of Keys for Middle
- In office 23 September 2021 – 24 September 2026

Personal details
- Born: Stuart Gordon Peters
- Party: Independent

Stuart Gordon Peters is a Manx politician and former radio presenter. He was elected as a Member of the House of Keys (MHK) for Middle in 2021. He did not run for re-election in 2026.

== Career ==
In June 2020, Manx Radio suspended Peters for comments he made discussing white privilege in relation to Black Lives Matter. He was later cleared by the Communications and Utilities Regulatory Authority.

He was elected in the 2021 Manx general election. In 2024, he resigned from the Department of Infrastructure. In July 2026, he announced he would not run for re-election in the 2026 Manx general election.

== See also ==
- List of members of the House of Keys, 2021–2026
