= Bill Henderson (Isle of Man legislator) =

Manx politician

Robert "Bill" William Henderson MLC RMN (born 28 December 1961) is a Manx legislator who, after winning a 1998 by-election, represented the constituency of Douglas North in the House of Keys, the directly elected lower branch of Tynwald, the Isle of Man's parliament. In 2010, he was elected to the upper house, the Legislative Council; he was re-elected in 2015 and again in 2020.

A native of the Isle of Man capital, Douglas, Henderson was educated at Ballakermeen and St Ninians High Schools, gained a Professional Diploma in Management from the Open University and followed a career in nursing before going into politics. He is also a member of the Transport & General Workers Union and the Celtic League. In 2004, he was appointed Minister for Agriculture, Fisheries and Forestry by Richard Corkill before being replaced the following year by Chief Minister Donald Gelling MLC.

== Governmental positions ==
- Chairman of the Planning Committee, 2001–2004
- Minister of Agriculture, Fisheries and Forestry, 2004–2005
