= Brenda Cannell =

Manx politician (born 1952)

Brenda Josephine Cannell MHK (née Jones, born 2 July 1952) is the current member of the House of Keys for Douglas East. She was first elected in the 1996 general election.

== Career ==
Cannell was a councillor for the Derby Ward of Douglas Town Council from 1992 to '95, serving as Chairman of the Public Health and Housing Committee (1993–94) and sitting on various other committees and groups. She also worked for the Isle of Man branch of Friends of the Earth.

In 1996 she was elected as an MHK, and since that time has been Chairman of the Isle of Man Water Authority from 2002 to '04, and then Chairman of the Planning Committee (2004-2005), amongst many other roles. She was re-elected in 2001, 2006, and 2011.

== Personal life ==
She was born Brenda Josephine Jones on 2 July 1952 in Liverpool and moved to the island in 1977. She was a hair stylist prior to becoming an MHK, and her interests include music, gardening and the environment. She is married to Charles Randall Cannell, they have two sons named Louis and Samuel. Brenda also has two brothers named Marcus and Stephen who have between them 6 children; Lyndsey, Marcus Jnr., Beth, Nicole, Jake and Robyn.

Preceded by Dominic Delaney & Phil Kermode	Member of the House of Keys; 1996–	Succeeded by Incumbent
