= David Ashford =

Manx politician (born 1977)

The Honourable David Ashford SHK MBE

Speaker of the House of Keys
- Incumbent
- Assumed office 29 September 2026
- Chief Minister: Chris Thomas
- Preceded by: Juan Watterson

Minister for the Treasury
- In office 15 October 2021 – 20 May 2022
- Chief Minister: Alfred Cannan
- Preceded by: Alfred Cannan
- Succeeded by: Alex Allinson

Minister for Health and Social Care
- In office 4 October 2018 – 15 October 2021
- Chief Minister: Howard Quayle
- Preceded by: Kate Costain
- Succeeded by: Lawrie Hooper

Minister for Home Affairs
- In office 24 February 2020 – 3 March 2020
- Preceded by: Bill Malarkey
- Succeeded by: Graham Cregeen

Member of the House of Keys for Douglas North
- Incumbent
- Assumed office 22 September 2016

Councillor for Victoria Ward
- In office 24 April 2008 – 22 September 2016

Personal details
- Born: David John Ashford; 1977 (age 48–49) Douglas
- Party: Independent
- Education: St Ninian's High School
- Alma mater: Edge Hill University

David John Ashford is an independent politician in the Isle of Man. He was born in 1977 in Douglas. He has served as a Member of the House of Keys (MHK) for the Douglas North constituency since 2016 and Speaker of the House of Keys since September 2026.

== Political career ==
Previously he had been a Borough Councilor for Douglas. In January 2018 he was appointed as Minister for Health and Social Care succeeding Kate Beecroft. This position was widely described as a "poisoned chalice" due to the department's financial problems.

In February 2020 he was briefly appointed as interim Minister for Home Affairs after the death of Bill Malarkey.

Ashford was appointed Member of the Order of the British Empire (MBE) in the 2020 Birthday Honours for services to the Isle of Man during the COVID-19 pandemic.

On 20 May 2022, he resigned from his role as Minister for the Treasury after an employment tribunal ruled that the Isle of Man's medical director, Dr Rosalind Ranson, had been unfairly sacked for being a whistleblower.

Following his reelection to the House of Keys in the 2026 General Election, he was elected as Speaker.

== Election results ==
2015 By-Election: Douglas North
Party	Candidate	Votes	%
Independent	Ralph Peake	604	43.74%
Independent	David Ashford	554	40.12%
Independent	Marie Booth	223	16.15%
Total valid votes		1381	
Rejected ballots		4	0.29%
Turnout		1385	

2016 Manx General Election: Douglas North
Party	Candidate	Votes	%
Independent	David Ashford	1219	32.07%
Independent	Ralph Peake	1177	30.97%
Independent	John Houghton	775	20.39%
Manx Labour Party	Lynn Sirdefield	343	9.02%
Independent	Karen Angela	287	7.55%
Total valid votes		3801	
Rejected ballots		11	0.14%
Registered electors		4,386	
Turnout		2172	49.52%

2026 Manx General Election: Douglas North
Party	Candidate	Votes	%
Independent	David Ashford	1121	57.14%
Independent	Damian Cappelli	798	40.67%
Independent	Hugo Yates	351	17.89%
Manx Labour Party	Peter Washington	271	13.81%
Change Isle of Man	Denis Staunton	194	9.89%
Independent	Janet Thommeny	239	12.18%
Total valid votes		3568	
Rejected ballots		5	0.14%
Registered electors		4,627	
Turnout		1962	45.98%
