= Julie Edge =

Manx politician

Julie Edge MHK

Member of the House of Keys for Onchan
- In office 22 September 2016 – 24 September 2026

Personal details
- Born: Isle of Man
- Party: Liberal Vannin Party; Independent
- Children: 1
- Education: Ballakermeen High School
- Alma mater: University of Leicester; Henley Management College

Julie Marie Edge is a Manx politician. She represents Onchan in the House of Keys and was Minister of Education, Sport and Culture from 2016 to 2024. Since 2025, she has served as Chair of the Select Committee on Whistleblowing Policy Implementation.

== Early life and education ==
Edge attended Ballakermeen High School. She graduated from the University of Leicester and Henley Management College (Reading).

== Career ==
Prior to a career in politics, Edge worked as a school business manager.

Edge was elected to represent the parish of Onchan in the House of Keys from 2016, as a Liberal Vannin Party candidate. She left the Liberal Vannin Party after a year and became an independent member of the House of Keys. Edge stood again for election in 2021, and was re-elected with an increased vote share.

Edge served as Minister of Education, Sport and Culture from 2016. In 2024, Edge was asked to step down from the position by Chief Minister of the Isle of Man, Alfred Cannan, and was succeeded by Daphne Caine. She had faced calls to resign the previous month over the threatened closure of a community pool.

In 2025, Edge was appointed as Chair of the Select Committee on Whistleblowing Policy Implementation.

== Election results ==
=== 2016 ===
2016 Manx General Election: Onchan
Party	Candidate	Votes	%
Independent	Robert Callister	1272	28.92%
Liberal Vannin Party	Julie Edge	953	21.67%
Independent	Timothy Craig	841	41.86%
Independent	David Quirk	822	18.69%
Independent	Anthony Allen	510	11.6%
Total valid votes		4398	
Rejected ballots		11	0.45%
Registered electors		4,997	
Turnout		2447	48.97%

=== 2021 ===
2021 Manx General Election: Onchan
Party	Candidate	Votes	%
Independent	Robert Callister	1600	38.72%
Independent	Julie Edge	1363	30.11%
Independent	James Cherry	570	13.79%
Independent	Peter Willers	433	10.48%
Independent	Michael Leather	177	4.28%
Total valid votes		4,398	
Rejected ballots		TBC	0%
Registered electors		TBC	
Turnout			0%
