= Alex Allinson =

Manx politician (born 1966)

The Honourable Alex Allinson BChir MHK
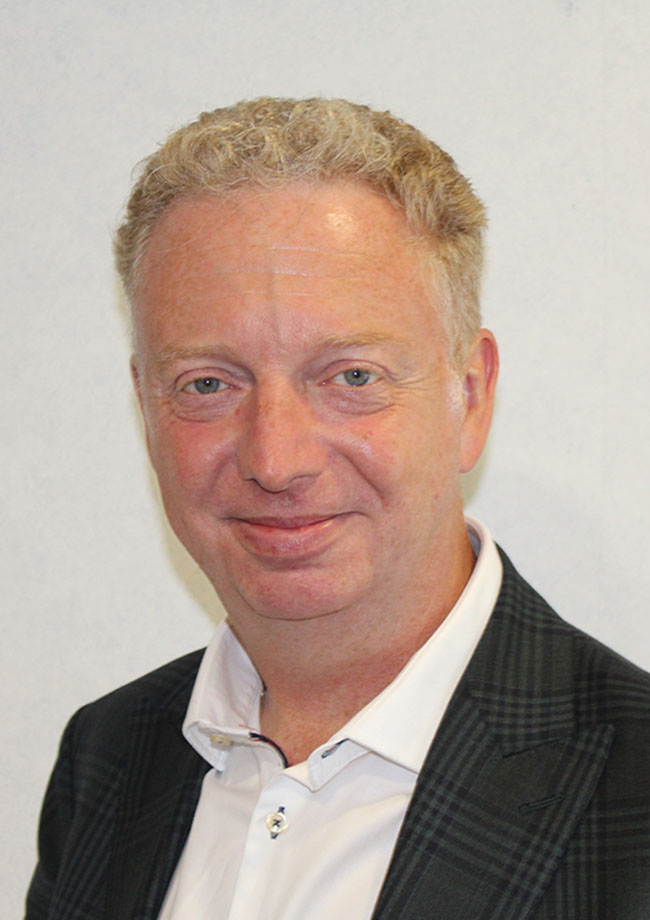

Member of the House of Keys for Ramsey
- Incumbent
- Assumed office 23 September 2021 Serving with Lawrie Hooper
Ministerial offices
Minister of the Treasury
Incumbent
Assumed office 20 May 2022
Chief Minister	Alfred Cannan
Preceded by	David Ashford
Minister for Enterprise
In office 15 October 2021 – 20 May 2022
Chief Minister	Alfred Cannan
Preceded by	Laurence Skelly
Succeeded by	Alfred Cannan
Minister for Education, Sport and Culture
In office 3 March 2020 – 15 October 2021
Chief Minister	Howard Quayle
Preceded by	Graham Cregeen
Succeeded by	Julie Edge

Personal details
- Born: 1966 (age 59–60) London, England
- Party: Independent
- Spouse: Gerri Allinson
- Children: 2
- Education: King's College, Cambridge MB BChir

Alexander John Allinson (born 1966) is an English-born Manx physician and politician who served as an independent member of the House of Keys, representing Ramsey from 2016 to 2026. Allinson served on the Council of Ministers as the Minister for the Treasury, having been appointed to the role in May 2022 by Alfred Cannan, the chief minister of the Isle of Man.

== Early life, education, and medical career ==
Allinson was born in London in 1966. He attended the Latymer Upper School, and studied medicine at King's College, Cambridge, graduating with a master's degree in 1991. After graduating from medical school, Allinson worked at Royal Children's Hospital in Melbourne, Australia for a year before returning to England, becoming a pediatrician in Hackney. After qualifying as a General Practitioner he later moved back to Australia, and spent over two years in Geraldton, where he worked with the Aboriginal Medical Service. He returned to England, becoming a locum tenens physician in London. In 2002, Allinson became a general practitioner in the town of Ramsey on the Isle of Man.

== Political career ==
From 2008 until 2016, Allinson had been a member of the Ramsey board of commissioners.

In the 2016 Manx general election, Allinson successfully stood for the House of Keys in Ramsey as an independent candidate, receiving 47% of the vote. He served in various positions in the House, including as the chair of the Manx Utilities Authority. In 2020, Allinson was appointed to the Council of Ministers as the Minister for Education, Sport and Culture by Chief Minister Howard Quayle.

Allinson sought re-election to the House of Keys in the 2021 Manx general election, and was re-elected with 25% of the vote. Allinson ran for Chief Minister following the election; he was defeated by Alfred Cannan, having received the votes of 8 MHKs compared to Cannan's 14. However, Cannan retained Allinson in the Council of Ministers and appointed him Minister for Enterprise. In this role, Allinson was in charge of much of the economy of the Isle of Man.

In May 2022, Allinson was appointed Minister for the Treasury following the resignation of David Ashford.

=== Political positions ===
Allinson has been described as a progressive reformer. In 2019, he led a successful legislative effort to legalize abortion on the Isle of Man. A supporter of efforts to counter climate change, Allinson helped create and fund a carbon offset plan for the 2022 Isle of Man TT. Allinson is also a proponent for assisted suicide for terminally-ill patients, having introduced two motions into the House of Keys regarding the matter. In 2025 he successfully guided a Private Members' Bill through Tynwald which was the first in the British Isles to legalise Assisted Dying for adults with a terminal illness. During his campaign for chief minister, Allinson outlined several other policies he would support, including affordable housing, further restriction on zero-hour contracts, and the decriminalisation of cannabis.
