= Isle of Man Green Party =

Political party on the Isle of Man

Isle of Man Green Party Partee Glass Vannin
- Leader: Lamara Craine
- Secretary: Andrew Langan-Newton
- Founded: 11 August 2016; 9 years ago
- Ideology: Green politics
- Colours: Green
- House of Keys: 0 / 24
- Legislative Council: 0 / 11
- Douglas Borough Council: 1 / 12
- Braddan Parish Commissioners: 1 / 5

Website
- www.greenparty.im

The Isle of Man Green Party (Manx: Partee Glass Vannin) is a green political party in the Isle of Man founded in August 2016. The party does not currently have any representation in the Isle of Man's legislature, the Tynwald, but does have two members of local government authorities. Since 2023, the party is led by Lamara Craine, who succeeded Andrew Langan-Newton as party leader.

The Isle of Man Green Party is one of four political parties on the Isle of Man, which is typically a country where independent political candidates stand for election. The other three parties on the island are the Manx Labour Party, the Liberal Vannin Party and the Mec Vannin party.

== Ideology and policies ==
The Isle of Man Green Party has adopted the six guiding principles of the Global Greens Charter;

- Ecological Wisdom
- Social Justice
- Participatory Democracy
- Non-Violence
- Sustainability
- Respect for Diversity

Although the party is not directly associated with Green Parties of other countries such as the Green Party of England and Wales, Scottish Greens or Green Party (Ireland), it is a member of the Green Isles Alliance, a panel of representatives of the green parties of the British Isles.

The Isle of Man Green Party supports free public transport. The party would immediately implement free public transport on Fridays, followed by complete full free public transport by 2030.

The party supports building The Mooir Vannin Offshore Wind Farm, six to twelve nautical miles off the island’s east coast. It would include around 87 wind turbines, with about 1.4 GW capacity.

== Electoral history ==
=== Local government ===
Two of the founding members of the Isle of Man Green Party were already members of local authorities when the party came into being. Andrew Jessopp, Chairman of Braddan Parish Commissioners, and Falk Horning, who won the 2016 by-election for Douglas's Murrays Ward with 226 votes.

The party first contested local authority elections in the summer 2018 with Daniel Webb in the Ramsey South by-election and then Andrew Bentley in the Douglas, Derby Ward, by-election. Andrew Bentley was the first Green Party candidate to be elected, winning a seat on the Douglas Borough Council.

Derby Ward by-election, 9 August 2018
Party	Candidate	Votes	%
Green	Andrew Bentley (elected)	191	42.1
Independent	Amanda Walker	139	30.6
Independent	Charlton Krentz	100	22.0
Independent	Claire Newall	24	5.3
Majority		52	11.5
Turnout		460	18.5
Rejected ballots		6	1.3

In September 2019, Green Party candidate Leo Cussons contested the Malew local authority by-election, achieving 131 votes (or 11.4% of the total), missing out on winning a local parish commissioner seat.

The 2021 Local Authority General Elections were contested by 5 Green Party candidates. In Douglas Andrew Bentley topped the poll in East Ward with 551 votes while Falk Horning came second in North Ward with 385 votes both were re-elected as councillors. In Castletown the Green Party candidate, Susan Rossouw, secured 188 votes, however this was not enough to be elected. Andrew Jessopp and Philip Matthews were both elected to the parish commissioners of Braddan and Patrick in uncontested elections.

Douglas East Ward election, 22 July 2021
Party	Candidate	Votes	%
Green	Andrew Bentley (elected)	551	63.6
Manx Labour	Devon Watson (elected)	540	62.3
Independent	Ian Clague (elected)	373	43.0
Independent	Angela Joughin	324	37.4
Independent	Linda Coe	235	27.1
Majority		11	1.2
Turnout		867	17.84
Rejected ballots		5	0.6

Douglas North Ward election, 22 July 2021
Party	Candidate	Votes	%
Independent	Janet Thommeny (elected)	446	53.0
Green	Falk Horning (elected)	385	45.8
Manx Labour	Peter Washington (elected)	376	44.7
Independent	Karen Angela	349	41.5
Majority		61	7.2
Turnout		841	16.05
Rejected ballots		7	0.8

In November 2021 deputy leader Lamara Craine received 406 votes in the Ramsey North Ward by-election to become the party's 5th local authority member.

Ramsey North Ward by-election, 25 November 2021
Party	Candidate	Votes	%
Independent	Luke Parker (elected)	457	54.34
Green	Lamara Craine (elected)	406	48.27
Independent	Adam Beighton (elected)	194	23.07
Independent	Tracy Kinrade	176	20.93
Independent	Pauline Johns-Garrett	175	20.80
Independent	Stella Moss	157	18.67
Independent	Janette Ferguson	154	18.31
Independent	Daniel Richardson	148	17.60
Independent	Grant Hill	109	12.96
Independent	Edward Wilson	53	6.30
Majority		51	6.06
Turnout		841	23.23
Rejected ballots		2	0.002

=== House of Keys ===
The Isle of Man Green Party's first opportunity to contest a House of Keys election came in the 2020 Douglas South by-election where Andrew Jessopp, Chairman of Braddan Commissioners was the party's candidate. Although unsuccessful Jessopp received 342 votes and came fourth out of ten candidates.

Douglas South by-election, 27 August 2020
Party	Candidate	Votes	%
Independent	Claire Christian (elected)	930	52.0
Independent	Paul Quine (elected)	469	26.2
Liberal Vannin	Michael Josem	463	25.8
Green	Andrew Jessopp	342	19.1
Independent	Pamela Birney-Malarkey	337	18.8
Independent	Anthony Allen	264	14.8
Independent	David Fowler	139	7.8
Independent	Kevin Oliphant-Smith	132	7.4
Independent	Ian Clanton aka HM The Sole	115	6.4
Independent	Lon Pinkerton	84	4.7
Majority		461	25.8
Turnout		1789	23.23
Rejected ballots		5	0.3

The 2021 general election saw the party field candidates in two constituencies. Leo Cussons stood in Glenfaba & Peel and Andrew Langan-Newton, the Green Party leader, Rushen (constituency)

== Elected representatives ==
The Isle of Man Green Party currently have 2 seats in local government.

Falk Horning sits on Douglas City Council. First elected in 2016, Falk Horning has, since August 2021, chaired the Council's Environment & Services Committee and sits on the Executive Committee. The party were also formerly represented by Andrew Bentley on the council.

Andrew Jessopp is a member of the Braddan Parish Commissioners and is their representative on the Eastern Joint Civic Amenity Site Committee. Lamara Craine formerly represented North Ward on Ramsey Town Commissioners and Philip Matthews formerly was a commissioner of the Patrick parish.

== Party leadership ==
From 2016 until 2023, Green Party founder Andrew Langan-Newton served as party leader. In 2023, deputy leader Lamara Craine succeeded Langan-Newton as party leader.

== Party conferences ==
The Party holds a number of events and conferences on a regular basis including, since 2018, an annual party conference which consists of an annual general meeting of the members of the party followed by a conference open to the general public and prospective members.

Green Party Conferences
Year	Venue	Catering	Speakers
2019	Laxey, Salmon Centre	Salmon Centre	Dr Doug Fox - 2nd IPCC Report Kylie Rollins - Running an Ethical Business Dr Henry Uniacke - Eco-blog Devon Watson - Fare Free Bus Campaign
2020	Castletown, Civic Centre	Secret Pizza Company	Sarah Mercer - Island Utopias Chris Thomas MHK - Single Legal Entity Government Bob Comish - Manx Hemp Campaign Pippa Lovell - What She Found
2021	Peel, Masonic Hall	Versa	Julia Erskine - An Introduction to SAP and EPCs Dr Henrietta Ewart - The Value of Wellbeing Keeran Hannifin - My Election journey as a Political Outsider Dr Henry Uniacke - Zero Carbon Churches by 2030
2022	St Johns, Church Hall	Greens	Clara Isaac - Recycle Collect Rob Mercer MLC - Government, Scrutiny & Oversight Dr Christa McCartney - The IOM & the UN Sustainable Development Goals Gary Clueit - The Island's Housing Problem
