= Zac Hall =

Manx politician

Zac Hall MHK is a former Member of the House of Keys for Onchan in the Isle of Man (from 2011 to 2016).
