= David Cretney =

Manx politician (born 1954)

David Cretney MLC
- Born: David Clifford Cretney; 15 January 1954 (age 72); Isle of Man
- Occupations: Politician; Businessman
- Years active: 1985–present (politician); 1985–2012 (business)
- Employer: Isle of Man Government
- Political party: Manx Labour
- Spouse: Deirdrie Sayle
- Children: 2 daughters

David Clifford Cretney (born 15 January 1954) is a Manx politician.

== Biography ==
Before going into politics, Cretney was a shop manager (1977–85) and he was also a businessman in the period 1985–2012.

He was, until March 2014, Minister of Infrastructure in the Isle of Man Government, and had formerly headed the Departments of Community, Culture & Leisure, Trade & Industry, and Tourism & Leisure. He was a Member of the House of Keys for the Manx Labour Party, representing Douglas South from 1985. He has been a member of the upper house, the Legislative Council since 2015.

In December 2012 and early January 2013 he closed down his two bargain-basement retail outlets having chosen not to renew the leases on either of his premises.

He was elected in the 2025 Manx local elections to the Douglas City Council.

== Governmental positions ==
- Chairman of the Post Office Authority, 1992–96
- Minister of Tourism and Leisure, 1996–2006
- Minister of Trade and Industry, 2006–10
- Minister of Community, Culture and Leisure, 2010–11
- Minister of Infrastructure, 2011–14
