= Lawrie Hooper =

Manx politician

Lawrie Hooper MHK

Minister for Health and Social Care
- In office 10 November 2022 – 15 October 2024
- Chief Minister: Alfred Cannan
- Preceded by: Rob Callister
- Succeeded by: Alfred Cannan (interim)

Minister for Enterprise
- In office 20 September 2022 – 14 February 2023
- Preceded by: Alex Allinson
- Succeeded by: Tim Johnston

Minister for Health and Social Care
- In office 18 October 2021 – 20 September 2022
- Preceded by: David Ashford
- Succeeded by: Rob Callister

Member of the House of Keys for Ramsey
- In office 22 September 2016 – 24 September 2026

Member of Ramsey Town Commissioners
- In office 26 April 2012 – 22 September 2016

Personal details
- Born: Cardiff, Wales
- Party: Liberal Vannin Party
- Spouse: Rachel Hooper
- Education: Ramsey Grammar School
- Alma mater: University of Keele

Lawrie Lee Hooper is a Welsh-born Manx politician who is the leader of Liberal Vannin Party and former Minister for Health and Social Care. He represented Ramsey in the House of Keys from 2016 until 2026.

== Early life ==
Hooper was born in Cardiff, Wales and grew up in Ramsey, Isle of Man. He studied at Ramsey Grammar School and Keele University.

He trained and qualified as a Chartered Accountant at PricewaterhouseCoopers on the Isle of Man with a focus on Audit. He then spent four years working as a Manager at Crowe Morgan.

== Political career ==
Hooper stood unsuccessfully for the House of Keys as an independent candidate in 2011. He served as a Ramsey Town Commissioner between April 2012 and September 2016, including as chairman for the 2016/17 term until his election to the House of Keys in 2016 as a Liberal Vannin candidate.

Hooper became leader of the Liberal Vannin Party in August 2020.

In 2023, Hooper brought forward a Private Member's Bill that aimed to ensure only elected members could vote in the Tynwald, thereby removing the ex officio vote of the Bishop of Sodor and Man; the Isle Of Man Constitution Bill 2023 is set to go before the House of Keys in late 2025.

Hooper has held two ministerial roles during his tenure as an MHK, including being the Minister for Enterprise and the Minister for Health and Social Care. He resigned his position as Minister for Health and Social Care in October 2024, attacking Chief Minister Alfred Cannan and claiming that he wishes to 'privatize our health service', something Hooper stated he could not support.

== Election results ==
=== 2011 ===
2011 Manx General Election: Ramsey
Party	Candidate	Votes	%
Independent	Allan Bell	1988	29.68%
Independent	Leonard Singer	1911	28.54%
Independent	Anne Craine	1818	27.15%
Liberal Vannin Party	Linda Bowers-Kasch	427	6.38%
Independent	Lawrie Hooper	310	4.63%
Independent	John McDonough	243	3.63%
Total valid votes		6697	
Rejected ballots		12	0.32%
Registered electors		5,789	
Turnout		3737	64.55%

=== 2016 ===
2016 Manx General Election: Ramsey
Party	Candidate	Votes	%
Independent	Alex Allinson	2946	47.1%
Liberal Vannin Party	Lawrie Hooper	1471	23.52%
Independent	Leonard Singer	886	14.16%
Independent	Nicholas Crowe	716	11.45%
Independent	John McDonough	236	3.77%
Total valid votes		6255	
Rejected ballots		15	0.43%
Registered electors		5,726	
Turnout		3500	61.12%
