= Douglas South =

House of Keys Constituency

Coordinates: 54°09′00″N 4°30′36″W

Douglas South is a House of Keys constituency in Douglas, Isle of Man.

Although the constituency is named Douglas South, its current (2020) boundaries place it in the west rather than the south of Douglas.

Like all the Keys constituencies, the constituency returns two members to the House of Keys. Following a general election in October 2021, the incumbents are Mrs Claire Christian and Sarah Maltby.

== MHKs & Elections ==
The following information is incomplete, and there were also significant boundary changes as the number of constituencies in Douglas increased from two to four.

Year	Election	Turnout	Candidates
1903	General Election	?	Surgeon General Alfred Sanderson, 572 votes, elected; Robert Clucas, 552 votes, elected; J J Goldsmith, 496 votes; W M Kerruish, 437 votes
1908	General Election	?	Robert Moughtin, 662 votes, elected; William Kerruish, 582 votes, elected; Walter Clucas Craine
1919	General Election	?	Alfred James Teare JP, elected; John Leigh Goldie Taubman JP CP, elected; ?
1922	By-Election	?	Walter Clucas Craine; ?
1924	General Election	?	Walter Clucas Craine, elected; Alfred James Teare JP, elected; ?
1929	General Election	Unopposed	Albert Hugh Teare, elected; Walter Clucas Craine, elected; Alfred James Teare JP, elected
1934	General Election	?	Walter Clucas Craine, elected; Alfred James Teare JP, elected; ?
1976	General Election	?	Peter Craine; ?
1981	General Election	?	Adrian Duggan; ?
1986	General Election	59.3%	Dominic Delaney (859 votes, elected); Phil Kermode (252 votes, elected); D Hayes (215 votes); D Martin (206 votes); JR Mitchell (152 votes); A Wylie (151 votes); R Chatel (136 votes); JJ Bell (124 votes)
1991	General Election	60.0%	David Cretney (Lab) (1422 votes, elected); Adrian Duggan (479 votes, elected); Allan Connor (310 votes); FA Kennish (200 votes); GM Bayliss (84 votes)
1996	General Election	56.0%	David Cretney (Lab) (2061 votes, elected); Adrian Duggan (796 votes, elected); John Tobin (755 votes); Patrick Bell (530 votes); Allan Connor (282 votes); John Cowley (247 votes)
2001	General Election	46%	David Cretney (Lab) (1956 votes, elected); Adrian Duggan (763 votes, elected); David Buttery (467 votes); Rodney Clarke (394 votes); Andrew Jessop (349 votes); Gary Cain (273 votes)
2006	General Election	57%	David Cretney (Lab) (1873 votes, elected); Bill Malarkey (873 votes, elected); David Buttery (829 votes); Phil Kermode (399 votes); Rodney Clarke (361 votes); Frank Schuengel (219 votes)
2011	General Election	46.6%	David Cretney (Lab) (1749 votes, elected); Kate Beecroft (Liberal Vannin) (1191 votes, elected); Bill Malarkey (1019 votes)
2015	By-Election		Bill Malarkey (598 votes, elected); Keith Fitton (502 votes); Amy Burns (273 votes); Kurt Buchholz (164 votes)

== Election results since 2016 ==
In 2014, Tynwald approved recommendations from the Boundary Review Commission which saw the reform of the Island's electoral boundaries.

General election 2021: Douglas South
Party	Candidate	Votes	%
Manx Labour	Sarah Louise Maltby	1,244	30.1
Independent	Claire Sarah Beverley Christian	1,242	30.0
Independent	Stephen Paul Quine	1,094	26.4
Independent	Gerard Peter Higgins	552	13.4
Total votes		4,132	
Total ballots		2,295	
Rejected ballots		4	
Turnout		2,299	46.9
Registered electors		4,897	

2020 Douglas South by-election
Party	Candidate	Votes	%
Independent	Claire Sarah Beverley Christian	930	28.4
Independent	Stephen Paul Quine	469	14.3
Liberal Vannin	Michael Derek Josem	463	14.1
Green	Andrew Charles Richard Jessopp	342	10.4
Independent	Pamela Jane Birnie-Malarkey	337	10.3
Independent	Anthony Allen	264	8.1
Independent	David Anthony Fowler	139	4.2
Independent	Kevin Oliphant-Smith	132	4.0
Independent	Ian James Clanton	115	3.5
Independent	Lon Pinkerton	84	2.6
Total votes		3,275	
Total ballots		1,789	
Rejected ballots		5	
Turnout		1,794	37.7
Registered electors		4,759	

General election 2016: Douglas South
Party	Candidate	Votes	%
Liberal Vannin	Kathleen Joan Beecroft	1,134	36.0
Independent	William Mackay Malarkey	952	30.2
Independent	Keith Daryl Fitton	767	24.4
Independent	David Anthony Fowler	296	9.4
Total votes		3,149	
Total ballots		1,800	
Rejected ballots		8	
Turnout		1,808	40.2
Registered electors		4,496	
