= Douglas North =

House of Keys constituency

Coordinates: 54°10′19″N 4°28′45″W

Douglas North is a House of Keys constituency in Douglas, Isle of Man. It elects 2 MHKs.

== MHKs & Elections ==
This information is incomplete.

Year	Election	Turnout	Candidates
1903	General Election	Unopposed	John Thomas Cowell, elected; William James Kermode, elected; John James Goldsmith, elected
1908	General Election	?	John Thomas Cowell, 1312 votes, elected; Armitage Rigby, 1477 votes, elected; W Goldsmith, 1212 votes, elected; ?
1919	General Election	?	Samuel Norris (2469 votes, elected); Robert Caesar Cain, elected; Ramsey Bignall Moore, elected; ?
1921	By-Election	?	Arthur Binns Crookall JP, elected; ?
1924	General Election	?	Ramsey Gelling Johnson, elected; Samuel Norris, elected; Arthur Binns Crookall JP, elected; ?
1929	General Election	?	John Kelly; ?; Samuel Norris, elected; ?, elected
1933	By Election	?	Samuel Norris, elected; ?
1934	General Election	?	Arthur Edwin Kitto, elected; Robert Hampton, elected; Samuel Norris, elected; John Kelly; ?
1978	By Election	54.5%	?; ?
1986	General Election	64.8%	Bernie May (1087 votes, elected); Julia Delaney (648 votes, elected); AA Ainsworth (420 votes)
1991	General Election	66.4%	Bernie May (802 votes, elected); David Corlett (370 votes, elected); Alan Crowe (289 votes); D Martin (210 votes); IA Faragher (160 votes); R Chatel (113 votes); JJ Bell (106 votes); MA Hooper (81 votes); MJ Shimmin (57 votes); GP Joughin (47 votes); MJ Nuttall (21 votes)
1995	By Election	40.3%	Alan Crowe (595 votes, elected); Mitchell (371 votes); R Chatel (361 votes); Want (237 votes)
1996	General Election	56.2%	John Houghton (1493 votes, elected); Alan Crowe (1241 votes, elected); Bernie May (827 votes); Brian Crookall (612 votes)
1998	By Election	?	Bill Henderson, elected; ?
Following the unopposed elevation to the Council of Edward Crowe.
2001	General Election	Unopposed	John Houghton, elected; Bill Henderson, elected
2006	General Election	54.4%	Bill Henderson (1627 votes, elected); John Houghton (1615 votes, elected); Mike Coleman (688 votes); Mark Atherton (290 votes)
2011	General Election	50.4%	John Houghton (1376 votes, elected); Bill Henderson (1227 votes, elected); Theodorus Fleurbaay (869 votes); Anthony Hill (722 votes)

== Election results since 2016 ==
In 2014, Tynwald approved recommendations from the Boundary Review Commission which saw the reform of the Island's electoral boundaries.

General election 2021: Douglas North
Party	Candidate	Votes	%
Independent	David John Ashford	1,567	44.8
Independent	John Charles Wannenburgh	753	21.6
Independent	George Ralph Peake	682	19.5
Independent	Kevin Oliphant-Smith	492	14.1
Total votes		3,494	
Total ballots		1,982	
Rejected ballots		9	
Turnout		1,991	42.2
Registered electors		4,713	

General election 2016: Douglas North
Party	Candidate	Votes	%
Independent	David John Ashford	1,219	32.1
Independent	George Ralph Peake	1,177	31.0
Independent	John Ramsey Houghton	775	20.4
Manx Labour	Lynn Sirdefield	343	9.0
Independent	Karen Angela	287	7.6
Total votes		3,801	
Total ballots		2,169	
Rejected ballots		3	
Turnout		2,172	49.5
Registered electors		4,386	
