= Juan Watterson =

Manx politician (born 1980)

The Honourable Juan Watterson FCA CMgr FCMI FRSA SHK
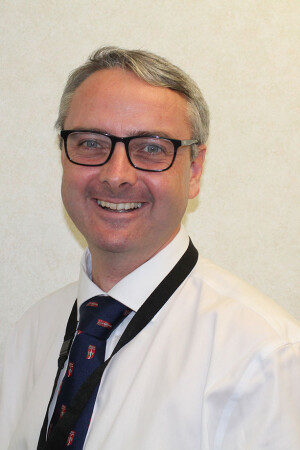

President of Tynwald
- Incumbent
- Assumed office 21 July 2026
- Preceded by: Laurence Skelly

Speaker of the House of Keys
- In office 27 September 2016 – 21 July 2026
- Preceded by: Steve Rodan
- Succeeded by: David Ashford

Minister for Home Affairs
- In office 13 September 2011 – 27 September 2016
- Preceded by: John Shimmin
- Succeeded by: John Shimmin

Member of the House of Keys for Rushen
- In office 23 November 2006 – 21 July 2026

Personal details
- Born: 1980 (age 45–46) Isle of Man
- Spouse: Helena Perry (m. 2010)
- Education: Rushen Infants School; Rushen Junior School; Castle Rushen High School; University of Lincoln
- Occupation: Politician, chartered accountant

Juan Paul Watterson (born 1980) is a Manx politician, who is President of Tynwald.

== Early life ==
Born in 1980 to John and Alison Watterson, he was educated at Rushen Infants School, Rushen Junior School and Castle Rushen High School.

== Qualification and professional memberships ==
Watterson attended the University of Lincoln (University of Lincolnshire & Humberside) where he graduated in 2001 with a First Class BA (Hons) in Management. He joined international accountancy firm KPMG where he qualified as a Chartered Accountant in 2005. He was the ICAEW Chairman of the National Student Council, and later served on the institute's Young Professionals Advisory Board, Public Sector Advisory Board and Members and Commercial Board of the Institute as well as having been part of its 90-member governing ICAEW Council.

== Career ==
Watterson was first elected to the House of Keys in 2006 aged 26 years 142 days, making him the second youngest ever elected MHK. He was appointed a political member of the Department of Local Government and the Environment and Chairman of the island's Planning Authority. Until May 2009, he had special responsibility as a "political member" for Housing (DoLGE) and Social Security within the Department of Health and Social Security (DHSS), these roles being the Manx equivalent of a junior minister in the UK. After 10 months as Chairman of the Planning Committee, he was appointed to the Department of Economic Development with special responsibility for the island's financial services sector.

He was re-elected in the 2011 General Election with 3,080 votes, the highest number of votes in the island, and the largest in Rushen since the 1986 boundary changes. He was appointed the Minister for Home Affairs, Chairman of the Communications Commission, and in 2012 became the island's first Armed Forces Champion. At 31 years 102 days, he became the youngest ever member of the Council of Ministers on his appointment as Minister for Home Affairs on 14 October 2011.

On 1 August 2016 he was appointed Honorary Colonel of the Isle of Man Army Cadet Force. In 2021, he was re-elected to the House of Keys with 2,384 votes, the largest total on the island, and re-elected unopposed as Speaker.

In 2021 he unsuccessfully contested the election for President of Tynwald, but in 2026 he was elected unopposed to that position.

== Election results ==
=== 2006 ===
2006 Manx General Election: Rushen
Party	Candidate	Votes	%
Independent	Juan Watterson	2430	23.53%
Independent	Phil Gawne	1794	17.37%
Independent	Quintin Gill	1689	16.36%
Independent	Philip Crellin	1432	13.87%
Independent	John Rimington	1048	10.15%
Independent	Anthony Wright	1000	9.68%
Independent	Adrian Tinkler	934	9.04%
Total valid votes		10327	
Rejected ballots		4	0.1%
Registered electors		6,199	
Turnout		4017	64.8%

=== 2011 ===
2011 Manx General Election: Rushen
Party	Candidate	Votes	%
Independent	Juan Watterson	3080	29.57%
Independent	Laurence Skelly	2021	19.40%
Independent	Phil Gawne	1942	18.64%
Independent	Quintin Gill	1722	16.53%
Independent	John Orme	1195	11.47%
Independent	David Jones	457	4.39%
Total valid votes		10417	
Rejected ballots		12	0.32%
Registered electors		5,789	
Turnout		3749	64.76%

=== 2016 ===
In 2014, Tynwald approved recommendations from the Boundary Review Commission which saw the reform of the island's electoral boundaries.

Under the new system, the island was divided into 12 constituencies based on population, with each area represented by two members of the House of Keys.

As a result of these changes the constituency was reduced in size and lost one of its three MHKs.

2016 Manx General Election: Rushen
Party	Candidate	Votes	%
Independent	Juan Watterson	2087	36.19%
Independent	Laurence Skelly	1212	21.02%
Independent	Mark Kemp	1104	19.14%
Independent	James Hampton	1033	17.91%
Independent	Leo Cussons	331	5.74%
Total valid votes		5767	
Rejected ballots		13	0.41%
Registered electors		5,446	
Turnout		3173	58.26%

=== 2021 ===
2021 Manx General Election: Rushen
Party	Candidate	Votes
Independent	Juan Watterson	2384
Independent	Michelle Haywood	1386
Independent	Mark Kemp	1163
Manx Green Party	Andrew Langan-Newton	1109

== Personal life ==
Watterson has been married to Helena (née Perry) since March 2010. They have a daughter and son together and live in Port St. Mary, Isle of Man.

== Publications ==
Tynwaldballs and Tynwaldballs 2, two collections of quotes and gaffes from the Manx parliament.
