= Department of Tourism and Leisure =

The Department of Tourism and Leisure (Manx: Rheynn Turrysid as Soccar) was a department of the Isle of Man Government.

== History ==
The department was created in 1986 as the Department of Tourism and Transport.

With the addition of extra responsibilities in 1990 the department was renamed the Department of Tourism, Leisure and Transport. In 1994 there was a departmental reorganisation. The Department of Highways Ports and Properties and the Department of Tourism, Leisure and Transport became the Department of Tourism and Leisure and the Department of Transport.

In 2010, the department was split up and Tourism function went to the Department of Economic Development and Leisure to Department of Community, Culture and Leisure.

== Ministers/Chairmen with Tourism Responsibility ==
=== Ministers for Economic Development ===
- John Shimmin, 2011–present
- Allan Bell MHK, 2010–2011

=== Ministers for Tourism and Leisure ===
- Martyn Quayle MHK, 2008–2010
- Adrian Earnshaw MHK, 2006–2008
- David Cretney MHK, 1996–2006
- Tony Brown MHK, 1994–1996

=== Ministers of Tourism, Leisure and Transport ===
- Allan Bell MHK, 1990–1994

=== Ministers of Tourism and Transport ===
- Allan Bell MHK, 1986–1990

=== Chairmen of the Tourist Board ===
- Edmund Lowey, 1981–1986
- Clifford Irving, 1971–1981
- William E. Quayle, 1962–1971
- James Cain, 1960–1962
- unknown, 1952–1962

=== Chairmen of the Publicity Board ===
- unknown, 1931–1952

=== Chairmen of the Advertising Board ===
Edward Callister, 1929–1930

- Samuel Norris, 1924–1929
- J R Kerruish, 1920–1924
- unknown, 1904–1920

=== Chairmen of the Advertising Committee ===
- unknown, ?-1904
