= Chris Thomas (Manx politician) =

Manx politician and pilot

The Honourable Christopher Charles Thomas Member of the House of Keys

Chief Minister of the Isle of Man
- Incumbent
- Assumed office 13 October 2026
- Monarch: Charles III
- Lieutenant Governor: John Lorimer
- Preceded by: Alfred Cannan

Minister for the Treasury
- In office 19 January 2026 – 13 October 2026
- Chief Minister: Alfred Cannan
- Preceded by: Alex Allinson

Member of the House of Keys for Douglas Central
- Incumbent
- Assumed office 22 September 2016 Serving with Peter Shimmin
- Preceded by: Constituency established

Member of the House of Keys for Douglas West
- In office 3 May 2013 – August 12 2016
- Succeeded by: Constituency abolished

Personal details
- Born: Christopher Charles Thomas Crawley, West Sussex, England
- Party: Independent
- Education: Milliom Comphrehensive
- Alma mater: Balliol College, Oxford

Christopher Charles Thomas MHK is the Chief Minister of the Isle of Man and a Member of the House of Keys in which he is one of two representatives for the constituency of Douglas Central.

== Early Life & Education ==
Known as Chris, Thomas was born in the town of Crawley, West Sussex, in 1963. His family subsequently moved to Millom, West Cumbria, where he attended Millom Comprehensive School before studying at Balliol College, Oxford, where he gained a degree in Philosophy, Politics and Economics. Whilst he was at Oxford, Thomas was a contemporary of the future Prime Minister of the United Kingdom, Boris Johnson.

Following a 15 year career in London as a financial analyst and university lecturer, Thomas then took an internship in the EU Commission in Brussels.

Thomas moved to the Isle of Man in 2001 in order to operate a franchised Financial Regulation MSc at a local Business School. Alongside university teaching, he was involved in international projects, including Chief Technical Advisor for Luxembourg’s Vietnam financial sector project (2009-11) and Project Director for EU China Financial Services Co-operation Project (2004-7).

== Political Career ==
Thomas enjoyed some limited involvement in UK local and national politics in mid-1980s. This included an internship with Labour European Commissioner Economics Advisor in Brussels. Thomas became involved in the Manx political scene around 2003, going on to become a member of Douglas Borough Council.

Having unsuccessfully stood in the 2011 Isle of Man General Election for the Liberal Vannin Party in which he contested one of the two seats available in Douglas West,Thomas was subsequently elected to represent the Douglas West Constituency as a result of a by-election in May 2013,in which he stood as an independent candidate.

Thomas was returned to represent the newly created Douglas Central Constituency at the 2016, 2021 and 2026 Manx General Elections. He served as Political Member for the Department of: Environment, Food and Agriculture 2014-2015; Home Affairs 2014-2016; Infrastructure 2014-2016; Health and Social Care 2024-2024.

Thomas has additionally served in Ministerial roles as Minister for Policy and Reform (2016 - 2020); Minister for the Department of Infrastructure (2022 - 2023) and subsequently as Treasury Minister (2026 - 2026).

Having being returned for Douglas Central in September 2026, Thomas announced his intention to stand for the office of Chief Minister of the Isle of Man. He was duly elected following a vote in the House of Keys on Tuesday October 13, 2026, securing sixteen votes against the six votes of his challenger Kirree Jenkins.

== Personal Life ==
Chris Thomas is married to Tanya, and the couple have three children (two sons and one daughter). Having completed the Postgraduate Certificate in Manx Studies, Thomas was appointed Chairman of Culture Vannin in November 2016. He is a keen player of the double bass.

== See also ==
- List of members of the House of Keys, 2016–2021
- List of members of the House of Keys, 2021–2026
