= Ballakermeen High School =

High school on the Isle of Man

Location
- St Catherine's Drive; Douglas, IM1 4BE; Isle of Man
- Coordinates: 54°09′16″N 4°29′36″W

Information
- Type: Comprehensive
- Motto: "Passionate about Learning"
- Established: 1939
- Local authority: Isle of Man Offshore Establishments
- Department for Education URN: 132422 Tables
- Headteacher: Mr Graeme Corrin
- Gender: Coeducational
- Age: 11 to 18
- Enrolment: 1700+
- Houses: Conister Hillary Langness Maughold Patrick
- Colour: Blue Yellow
- Website: https://bhs.sch.im/

Ballakermeen High School is a coeducational comprehensive secondary school based on a single site in Douglas, on the Isle of Man. It is the second largest Isle of Man Government building after Noble's Hospital in Strang. On the start of the 2022/2023 academic year, a new head teacher was appointed, Mr Graeme Corrin, replacing Mrs Adrienne Burnnet, who was Head Teacher for 21 years.

== History ==
Ballakermeen formed part of HMS St George during the Second World War. This was the Royal Navy's only Continuous Service Training Establishment, where cadets would receive an education comparable to that of a Secondary School. It was opened in September 1939.

Starting at the age of 16, the cadets who passed through HMS St George received a concentrated 15 months training course in the Seaman, Signal and Wireless Telegraphy Communications branches. A staff of over 300 officers provided the educational background to the practical and technical training for the cadets.

To give breadth to their education, English subjects and Naval history were taught, with lectures additionally being devoted to mathematics and its service application to science and navigation, with emphasis placed on the practical rather than the academical aspects of the subjects. Classroom work at Ballakermeen was supplemented by instructional films and practical experiments. Separate classes were formed for cadets of different branches of the service, with each class consisting of 25-30 cadets under the charge of a qualified Naval Schoolmaster.

The officer in charge of Ballakermeen was Captain A.J. Lowe and by the end of the war 8,677 cadets had passed through the establishment.

HMS St George was paid off on Thursday, 20 December 1945, with the officers and ratings leaving the Isle of Man and relocating to HMS Ganges, Shotley. Following the decommissioning ceremony and to commemorate the association of Ballakermeen with the Royal Navy a signal mast, which had been in use in the Signal School, was presented by Captain Stevens-Guille to the Isle of Man Education Authority. It was hoped that the mast would have been erected in the grounds of the school, and a brass plate commemorating the role the school had played during the war years.

In a letter thanking the Authority Captain Stevens-Guille wrote:

"On behalf of the Royal Navy as a whole, and in particular the Officers and Ratings who have enjoyed the facilities you so willingly placed at our disposal, I should like to express our warmest gratitude for the generous assistance which has been given so unstintingly by the Isle of Man Education Authority. I am glad to recall how friendly have been our relations with the Authority, and with you, the Director of Education, in particular. Your assistance and advice have been invaluable."

— Captain Stevens-Guille. Thursday 20 December 1946.

== Current use ==
The school used to be a Junior High School where pupils attended from the age of 11 to 14 and they would then go to a Senior High School such as St Ninians. Both schools became full high schools.

It currently has 1700+ students aged 11–18, making it the larger of the two secondary schools in Douglas in terms of student numbers and the largest on the island (St Ninian's High School is the other secondary school in Douglas). The school offers GCSEs, BTECs and City and Guilds qualifications for study. The sixth form department of the school (renovated and extended during 2013-2014 period) offers A-level qualifications. Facilities at the school include a swimming pool, sports hall, ICT suites, laboratories and a theatre. The school's sports field is changed every season for a fitting sport. in autumn it is used as a rugby pitch, in early spring it is used as a football pitch and in early summer there is a running track.

The school was used as a location in the 2006 British spy film Stormbreaker.

In November 2014, work began on a new £3.2M three-storey extension to accommodate Ballakermeen's 300 sixth form students.

It also has the studio theatre

== Performance ==
As a Manx school, Ballakermeen High School is not subject to inspection by Ofsted. Instead, schools are evaluated using a process called 'school self-review and evaluation'. Ballakermeen High School was most recently evaluated in April 2018, and was mostly found to be either 'effective' or 'very effective'.

== Notable former pupils ==
- Mark Cavendish — professional road cyclist
- Bill Henderson — former member of the House of Keys for Douglas North and currently (2020) a member of the Legislative Council of the Isle of Man
- Joe Locke — actor best known for portraying Charlie Spring in Netflix series Heartstopper
- Martyn Quayle — former member of the House of Keys for Middle, previously held the position of Minister of Tourism and Leisure in the Isle of Man Government
- Paul Quine — member of the House of Keys
