= Tim Crookall =

Manx politician

Timothy Mark Crookall is a Member of the House of Keys (the lower house of Tynwald, the Isle of Man parliament) for Glenfaba & Peel, elected in the 2021 Manx general election. He was formerly Member of the House of Keys for Peel from 2006 to 2015 (succeeding Hazel Hannan), and Minister for Education and Children from 2012 to 2016. Since 2015, he has been a member of the upper house, the Legislative Council. He served as Chair of the Manx Utilities Authority from 7 March 2023 to 22 November 2023.

== Governmental positions ==
- Chairman of Isle of Man Water Authority, 2009–11
- Minister of Community, Culture and Leisure, 2011–12
- Minister for Education and Children, 2012–16
