= University College Isle of Man =

Educational institution

Coordinates: 54.17149°N 4.478767°W

- Colleish-Ollooscoill, Ellan Vannin
- Former names: Douglas School of Art; College of Further Education; Isle of Man College
- Type: Tertiary education; Vocational education; Higher education
- Established: 1880
- Academic affiliations: University of Chester
- Principal: Jesamine Kelly
- Location: Douglas; Isle of Man
- Website: https://www.ucm.ac.im/

University College Isle of Man (UCM; Manx: Colleish-Ollooscoill, Ellan Vannin) is the primary centre for tertiary, vocational education, higher education and adult education on the British Crown dependency of the Isle of Man, located in the Manx capital Douglas.

== History ==
Founded as the Douglas School of Art on Loch Promenade in November 1880, the college was renamed the School of Technology, Arts and Crafts upon relocation to the Government Building on Lord Street in 1947, with a 1960 rebranding as the College of Further Education and a 1971 move to the present campus on Homefield Road. Since 1 April 2016, the college has been known as University College Isle of Man.

Just prior to the rebranding of the Isle of Man College as the University College Isle of Man, the college's enrollment was stated to be 160 full-time students.

== Courses ==
UCM offers more than 300 courses including Administration, Art, Business, Catering, Childcare, Computing, Construction, Counselling Skills, Design, Education Studies, Engineering, English, Finance, Forensic Science and Criminology, Hair & Beauty, Health & Social Care, History, Horticulture, Hospitality, Maths, Media, Music, Preparation for Life and Work, Science and Sport - with more courses added regularly.

The courses are available at various levels from age 14 - 16, further education, higher education and adult education.

UCM's provision of higher education (degrees, degree-level and postgraduate) courses including HNCs, HNDs, and an MBA. Degree level courses are offered in conjunction with the University of Chester (since 1996) and formerly Liverpool John Moores University.

In addition to academic and vocational qualifications, UCM offers some professional certifications, short courses, and introductory programmes of study.

UCM's adult learning programme also includes a comprehensive range of leisure and recreation courses. Additionally UCM runs the prison education programme.

== Campuses ==
UCM has six campuses around Douglas including Homefield Road, William Kennish, Thie Ushtey, Elmwood House, Hills Meadow and The Nunnery. Leisure and recreation courses (short courses and workshops) are held at locations all around the Island.

== Students ==
421 students enrolled into Higher Education at UCM in the academic year 2019/20. This has risen from 188 students enrolling into Higher Education at UCM in the academic year 2011/12.

== Staffing ==
As of 8 September 2020 UCM engaged/employed 310 lecturers:

- 93 full time lecturers
- 29 part-time lecturers
- 187 Zero-hour contract lecturers

The average attendance of lecturing staff at UCM for the period 1 January 2019 - 31 December 2019 was 96%.

As of January 2002 UCM engaged/employed lecturers:

- 96 full-time or salaried (61 men and 35 women)
- 165 hourly-paid (77 men and 88 women)

As of December 2001 UCM engaged/employed lecturers:

- 95 full-time or salaried (61 men and 34 women)
- 155 hourly-paid (74 men and 81 women)
