= Liberal Vannin Party =

Political party on the Isle of Man

Liberal Vannin Party Partee Libraalagh Vannin
- Leader: Lawrie Hooper MHK
- Chairman: Paul Weatherall
- Founder: Peter Karran
- Founded: August 2006
- Headquarters: Douglas, Isle of Man
- Ideology: Liberalism; Euroscepticism
- Political position: Centre
- International affiliation: Liberal International (observer)
- British affiliation: Liberal Democrats
- House of Keys: 0 / 24
- Legislative Council: 0 / 11
- Douglas Borough Council: 0 / 12

Website
- liberalvannin.im

The Liberal Vannin Party (LVP; Manx: Partee Libraalagh Vannin) is a political party in the Isle of Man. It was founded in 2006 by Peter Karran, then an independent MHK for Onchan. Karran had been, until 2004, a member of the Manx Labour Party. The "Vannin" in the party name is a form of the name of the Isle of Man in the native Manx Gaelic language, while "Liberal" is a reference to the general political position of the party. The party is currently led by Lawrie Hooper MHK.

The Liberal Vannin Party put forward several candidates at the 2006 general election and had two MHKs elected. In the 2011 general election, they returned three MHKs. This result was mirrored in the 2016 general election, but one of these subsequently resigned from the party, and one died in 2020. The party had 4 candidates in the 2021 Manx general election, of whom one (Hooper) was elected. As of 2021, they are one of only two parties in the House of Keys; the remaining 21 out of the 24 members are independents. The party do not currently hold any seats on the Douglas Borough Council.

The party campaigns on a platform of greater accountability and transparency in government and also strives for further devolution from the United Kingdom to the Isle of Man.

== History ==
The Liberal Vannin Party was founded in 2006 by Peter Karran, a former member of the Manx Labour Party. Karran was joined by Tony Wright who was already intending to contest Rushen as an independent. It was announced that their target seats would be Douglas South, Middle and Onchan.

The party stood nine candidates in the 2006 Manx general election, and two of them were elected: Peter Karran in Onchan and Bill Malarkey in Douglas South. Karran received more votes than any other candidate in the election. After being elected representing the Liberal Vannin Party, Malarkey resigned from the party and sat as an independent. The Liberal Vannin Party sent delegates to the Liberal International's 2007 Hamburg Conference, where they became Observer Members pending verification at the 2008 Belfast Conference. Since the 2008 Belfast Conference, Liberal Vannin has been an official Observer Member of Liberal International. The Liberal Vannin Party is also listed as a "Sister Party" of the British Liberal Democrats.

At the 2011 Manx general election, the Liberal Vannin Party stood ten candidates, received 20.9% of the vote and had three Members of the House of Keys elected. These were Peter Karran and Zac Hall in Onchan, and Kate Beecroft in Douglas South. Beecroft, standing as the official Liberal Vannin candidate, defeated Bill Malarkey who had previously been a member of the party but was contesting the seat as an independent.

From 2011 to 2012, Karran served in the Isle of Man Government as the Minister for Education and Children. In May 2012 Zac Hall had his membership revoked for "bringing the party into disrepute", leaving them with only two MHKs. In 2014 Kate Beecroft (subsequently known as Kate Costain) was elected Leader of the Liberal Vannin Party, with Karran saying it "was time for a change".

In 2020, Costain resigned and Lawrie Hooper MHK was elected as her replacement. He is now the only LibVan MHK.

== General election results: House of Keys ==
Liberal Vannin Party
Election year	Total no. of votes	Overall % of votes	No. of seats won
2006	7,323 ▲	14.2% ▲	2 / 24
2011	11,679 ▲	20.9% ▲	3 / 24
2016	3,597 ▼	6.4% ▼	3 / 24
2021	3,138 ▼	5.3% ▼	1 / 24
2026	1,649 ▼	2.8% ▼	0 / 24

== Party leaders ==
Leader	Tenure	Notes
Peter Karran MHK	2006–2014	MHK from 1985–2016
Kate Costain MHK	2014–2020	MHK from 2011–2020
Lawrie Hooper MHK	2020–present	MHK from 2016–2026

== See also ==
- Elections in the Isle of Man
- List of political parties in the Isle of Man
