= Daphne Caine =

Manx politician (born 1969)

Member of the House of Keys for Garff
- In office 22 September 2016 – 24 September 2026

Personal details
- Born: Daphne Hilary Penelope Caine; 1969 (age 56–57) Sheffield, England
- Party: Independent
- Spouse: Christopher Caine
- Children: 2
- Education: King Edward VII School; Stradbroke College
- Occupation: Politician

Daphne Hilary Penelope Caine (born 1969) is an English-born Manx politician and former civil servant. She was elected to the House of Keys representing Garff in 2016 and re-elected for the same constituency in 2021. Following the 2021 election, she was elected as Deputy Speaker of the House of Keys. She previously worked on the Isle of Man as a journalist and civil servant.

== Biography ==
Born in Sheffield, England, in 1969, and brought up there, Caine was educated at King Edward VII School and later at Stradbroke College, Sheffield. From 1989 to 1996, she worked as a journalist for Isle of Man Newspapers, after which she joined the island's civil service, initially at the Department of Tourism and Leisure, later at the Department of Home Affairs and the Department of Infrastructure, where she concentrated on the island's public transport.

In 2016, Caine was elected to the Tynwald, where she serves as a Member of the House of Keys for Garff as an Independent. She has served as a political member of the Department for Enterprise since 2016 and was Children's Champion from 2016 to 2018.

== Election results ==
=== 2016 ===
2016 Manx General Election: Garff
Party	Candidate	Votes	%
Independent	Martyn John Perkins	1767	36.35%
Independent	Daphne Caine	1270	26.13%
Independent	Andrew Smith	1247	25.65%
Independent	Andrew Barton	346	8.55%
Independent	Nigel Dobson	231	5.71%
Total valid votes		4861	
Rejected ballots		11	0.52%
Registered electors		5,069	
Turnout		2536	49.77%

== Personal life ==
She is married to Christopher Caine, a native of the Isle of Man, with whom she has two children.
