= House of Keys =

Lower house of the Isle of Man parliament

House of Keys Yn Kiare as Feed

Type
- Type: Lower house of the High Court of Tynwald

Leadership
- Speaker: David Ashford SHK since 27 September 2016

Structure
- Seats: 24
- Political groups: Speaker (1): Independent (1); Council of Ministers (9): Independent (9); Others (14): Independent (12); Manx Labour (2)

Elections
- Voting system: Multiple non-transferable vote
- Last election: 24 September 2026
- Next election: 25 September 2031

Meeting place
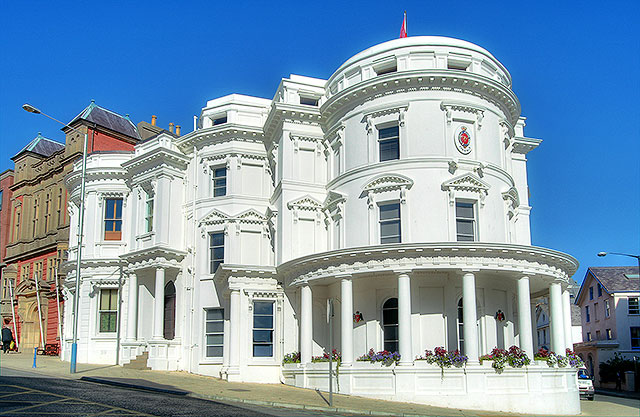
- Chamber of the House of Keys, Legislative Buildings, Douglas; 54°09′03″N 4°28′53″W

Website
- www.tynwald.org.im/about/house-of-keys

The House of Keys (Manx: Yn Kiare as Feed) is the directly elected lower house of Tynwald, the parliament of the Isle of Man, the other branch being the Legislative Council.

== History ==
The oldest known reference to the name is in a document of 1417, written in Latin by an English scholar, which refers to Claves Mann[iae] (the "Keys of Man") and Claves Legis (the "Keys of Law"). There is a dispute, however, over the origin of the name. The word keys is thought by some to be an English corruption of a form of the Norse verb kjósa ("to choose"). However, a more likely explanation is that it is a mishearing of the Manx-language term for "four and twenty": kiare as feed [ˈkʲiːəs ˈfid], the House having always had 24 members. The Manx-language name of the House remains Yn Kiare as Feed ("The Four and Twenty").

== Governance ==
Members are known as Members of the House of Keys (MHKs). Citizens over the age of 16 may vote, while one must be at least 18 years old and a resident of the island for three years to be elected an MHK. There are 12 constituencies, mainly based on the sheadings and on local government units. (A few local government units are split between two constituencies.) Each sends two members to the House of Keys, elected by plurality voting (each elector can vote for up to two candidates). The term of the House of Keys is normally fixed at five years, but provisions exist for dissolution before the expiration of the term.

The Speaker of the House of Keys (SHK) is an MHK elected by the Keys as the presiding officer. The Speaker votes in the House of Keys, but, unlike other members, may abstain; however, when the vote is tied the Speaker must cast the deciding vote. The Speaker also acts as Deputy President of Tynwald Court.

The House of Keys elects 8 of the 11 members of the Legislative Council. Legislation does not usually originate in the council. (There are exceptions: for example the Equality Bill was introduced in the Legislative Council in late 2016.) Thus, the Keys have much more power than the council, which performs the function of a revising chamber.

The House of Keys meets about once each month together with the Legislative Council in a joint session called Tynwald Court. During the COVID pandemic, these meetings were more frequent. The President of Tynwald, elected by both branches, presides over Tynwald Court and over the Legislative Council. Once each year, however, on Tynwald Day, the Isle of Man's national day, the Lieutenant Governor (or a member of the Royal Family) presides.

== Meeting place ==
The House of Keys usually meets in their chamber in the Legislative Buildings in Douglas. Seating is allocated in alphabetical order by constituency name (in English) and organised into two rows. Members who received the highest number of votes in their constituency sit in the front row. On 14 March 2017 the Keys met in the Old House of Keys in Castletown, for the first time since 1874, to commemorate the sesquicentenary of the first elected House of Keys. During the COVID pandemic, these meetings were sometimes held remotely (or partly remotely).

== Membership ==
Constituency	MHKs	
Constituency	Pre 2026	Post 2026
Arbory, Castletown & Malew	Jason Moorhouse	Kirrie Anne Jenkins
Arbory, Castletown & Malew	Tim Glover	Jason Moorhouse
Ayre & Michael	Alfred Cannan	Stephen Broad
Ayre & Michael	Tim Johnston	Alf Cannan
Douglas Central	Anne Corlett	Peter Shimmin
Douglas Central	Chris Thomas	Chris Thomas
Douglas East	Joney Faragher	Andrew Saunders
Douglas East	Clare Barber	Joney Faragher
Douglas North	David Ashford	David Ashford
Douglas North	John Wannenburgh	Damian Ciapelli
Douglas South	Claire Christian	Sarah Maltby
Douglas South	Sarah Maltby	Clare Christian
Garff	Daphne Caine	Richard Henthorn
Garff	Andrew Smith	Victoria Hewison
Glenfaba & Peel	Kate Lord-Brennan	Katryna Baptist
Glenfaba & Peel	Tim Crookall	Daniel Davison
Middle	Jane Poole-Wilson	Jane Poole-Wilson
Middle	Stu Peters	James Cochrane
Onchan	Julie Edge	Rachel Glover
Onchan	Rob Callister	Rob Callister
Ramsey	Alex Allinson	Juan McGuinness
Ramsey	Lawrie Hooper	Robert Cowell
Rushen	Juan Watterson	Michael Crowe
Rushen	Michelle Haywood	Mark Kemp
