= 1924 Manx general election =

General elections were held in the Isle of Man between 28 October and 6 November 1924. Independent candidates won a majority of seats in the House of Keys.

== Electoral system ==
The 24 members of the House of Keys were elected from 11 constituencies, which had between one and three seats.

Constituency	Electorate	Seats	Date of election
Ayre	2,008	3	4 November
Castletown	–	1	N/A
Douglas North	9,978	3	4 November
Douglas South	4,348	2	4 November
Garff	2,257	2	5 November
Glenfaba	2,533	3	6 November
Michael	1,333	2	31 October
Middle	3,189	3	31 October
Peel	2,086	1	30 October
Ramsey	3,169	1	30 October
Rushen	4,293	3	5 November
Source: Sherratt

== Campaign ==
A total of 43 candidates contested the elections; 31 independents, 11 from the Manx Labour Party and one from Independent Labour. Despite winning seats in the 1919 elections, neither the National Party nor the Liberal Party nominated candidates.

== Results ==
Party	Votes	%	Seats	+/–
Manx Labour Party	12,744	28.05	6	+2
Independent Labour	121	0.27	0	New
Independents	32,575	71.69	18	+1
Total	45,440	100.00	24	0
Registered voters/turnout	35,194	–		
Source: Sherratt

=== By constituency ===
Constituency	Candidate	Party	Votes	%	Notes
Ayre	R. Cain	Independent	940	25.6	Re-elected
Ayre	D.J. Teare	Independent	789	21.5	Re-elected
Ayre	J.F. Crellin	Independent	707	19.2	Elected
Ayre	T.B. Cowley	Independent	617	16.8	
Ayre	J. Corlett	Independent	501	13.6	
Ayre	C. Gill	Independent Labour	121	3.3	
Castletown	Joseph Davidson Qualtrough	Independent	–	–	Re-elected unopposed
Douglas North	S. Norris	Independent	3,894	27.0	Re-elected
Douglas North	A.B. Crookall	Independent	3,604	25.0	Re-elected
Douglas North	R.G. Johnson	Independent	3,520	24.5	Elected
Douglas North	J. Kelly	Manx Labour Party	3,379	23.5	
Douglas South	A.J. Teare	Manx Labour Party	1,792	36.6	Re-elected
Douglas South	W.C. Craine	Manx Labour Party	1,415	28.9	Elected
Douglas South	T.W. Cain	Independent	1,389	28.4	
Douglas South	J. Goldsmith	Independent	295	6.1	
Garff	W.K. Cowin	Manx Labour Party	629	23.0	Elected
Garff	T. Callow	Independent	575	21.0	Elected
Garff	J.W. Walton	Independent	549	20.1	
Garff	J.C. Douglas	Independent	542	19.8	
Garff	G.C. Preston	Independent	441	16.1	
Glenfaba	F.S. Dalgleish	Independent	1,032	26.1	Re-elected
Glenfaba	J.T. Quilliam	Independent	799	20.2	Re-elected
Glenfaba	W.P. Clucas	Manx Labour Party	791	20.0	
Glenfaba	G.B. Kermode	Independent	674	17.1	
Glenfaba	W. Christian	Independent	657	16.6	
Michael	J.W. Cannan	Independent	646	45.1	Re-elected
Michael	E.J. Curphrey	Independent	560	39.1	Re-elected
Michael	W. Shimmin	Manx Labour Party	226	15.8	
Middle	C. Gill	Independent	1,553	35.6	Re-elected
Middle	W.F. Cowell	Independent	1,113	25.6	Elected
Middle	George Frederick Clucas	Independent	940	21.6	Re-elected
Middle	T.G. Bridson	Manx Labour Party	750	17.2	Unseated
Peel	Christopher R. Shimmin	Manx Labour Party	803	59.0	Re-elected
Peel	T.W. Kermode	Independent	557	41.0	
Ramsey	A.H. Teare	Independent	1,401	61.5	Re-elected
Ramsey	A. Hadley	Manx Labour Party	876	38.5	
Rushen	J.R. Corrin	Manx Labour Party	1,314	20.7	Re-elected
Rushen	A. Qualtrough	Independent	1,128	17.7	Re-elected
Rushen	W. Moore	Independent	1,043	16.4	Elected
Rushen	E.B. Gawne	Independent	823	12.9	
Rushen	W.H. Costain	Independent	816	12.8	
Rushen	C.A. Cormode	Manx Labour Party	769	12.1	
Rushen	P.H. Cain	Independent	470	7.4	
Source: Sherratt
