= List of political parties on the Isle of Man =

The following is a list of political parties on the Isle of Man.

== Active parties ==
=== Represented in the House of Keys ===
Name	Abbr.	Political ideology	Political position	British affiliation	Year founded	MHKs	Status
Manx Labour Party; Yn Partee Obbraghys Manninagh	MLP	Social democracy	Centre-left	Labour	1918	2 / 24	Opposition

As of September 2026, all except two members of both branches of Tynwald are independents.

=== Other parties ===
- Isle of Man First
- Isle of Man Green Party
- Liberal Vannin Party
- Mec Vannin

== Political pressure groups ==
- Alliance for Progressive Government (APG)
- Positive Action Group (PAG)
- Mec Vannin
- Manx Independence Movement (MIM)
- Manx Progressive Party (MPP)
- Isle of Man Climate Change Coalition (CCC)
- Isle of Man Student Climate Network (IOMSCN)
- Isle of Man Libertarians (IOMLUK)
- Free Public Transport: Isle of Man (Fare Free Campaign)

Mec Vannin, although an electoral party in its early years (several MHKs are ex-members) has evolved into a quasi-pressure group.

== Defunct parties ==
- Independent Labour
- National Party
- Manx National Party
- Liberal Party
- Manx People's Political Association

== See also ==
- Politics of the Isle of Man
- List of political parties by country
