= 1934 Manx general election =

General elections were held in the Isle of Man between 23 and 29 November 1934. Independent candidates won a majority of seats in the House of Keys.

== Electoral system ==
The 24 members of the House of Keys were elected from 11 constituencies, which had between one and three seats.

Constituency	Electorate	Seats	Date of election
Ayre	2,262	3	27 November
Castletown	–	1	N/A
Douglas North	8,481	3	26 November
Douglas South	6,572	2	26 November
Garff	2,462	2	29 November
Glenfaba	2,501	3	27 November
Michael	1,310	2	28 November
Middle	4,468	3	23 November
Peel	–	1	N/A
Ramsey	3,119	1	23 November
Rushen	4,529	3	23 November
Source: Sherratt

== Campaign ==
A total of 39 candidates contested the elections; 30 independents, seven from the Manx Labour Party and two from Independent Labour.

== Results ==
Party	Votes	%	Seats	+/–
Manx Labour Party	12,072	23.88	5	–2
Independent Labour	530	1.05	0	0
Independents	37,960	75.08	19	+2
Total	50,562	100.00	24	0
Registered voters/turnout	35,704	–		
Source: Sherratt

=== By constituency ===
Constituency	Candidate	Party	Votes	%	Notes
Ayre	D.J. Teare	Independent	917	21.0	Re-elected
Ayre	E.B.C. Farrant	Independent	905	20.7	Elected
Ayre	A.J. Cottier	Independent	900	20.6	Re-elected
Ayre	G. Teare	Independent	845	19.4	
Ayre	J.W. Brew	Independent	604	13.8	
Ayre	J. Corlett	Independent	196	4.5	
Castletown	Joseph Davidson Qualtrough	Independent	–	–	Re-elected unopposed
Douglas North	S. Norris	Independent	3,743	29.3	Re-elected
Douglas North	A.E. Kitto	Independent	3,667	28.7	Elected
Douglas North	R.Q. Hampton	Independent	2,739	21.4	Elected
Douglas North	J. Kelly	Manx Labour Party	2,626	20.6	Unseated
Douglas South	A.J. Teare	Manx Labour Party	2,991	40.3	Re-elected
Douglas South	W.C. Craine	Manx Labour Party	2,518	34.0	Re-elected
Douglas South	T.H. Cowin	Independent	1,907	25.7	
Garff	W.K. Cowin	Manx Labour Party	931	33.3	Re-elected
Garff	T. Callow	Independent	823	29.5	Re-elected
Garff	E. Oliver	Independent	614	22.0	
Garff	R.H. McGuffie	Independent Labour	426	15.2	
Glenfaba	T.A. Quayle	Independent	1,367	31.5	Re-elected
Glenfaba	R. Kneen	Independent	1,069	24.6	Re-elected
Glenfaba	J. Clinton	Independent	1,050	24.1	Unseated
Glenfaba	J. Callister	Independent	859	19.8	
Michael	J.F. Crellin	Independent	576	47.8	Re-elected
Michael	T.H. Kneen	Independent	526	43.6	Re-elected
Michael	C. Gill	Independent Labour	104	8.6	
Middle	C. Gill	Independent	2,274	30.7	Re-elected
Middle	George Frederick Clucas	Independent	1,926	26.0	Re-elected
Middle	J.H.L. Cowin	Independent	1,791	24.2	Re-elected
Middle	T.G Bridson	Manx Labour Party	1,416	19.1	
Peel	Marion Shimmin	Manx Labour Party	–	–	Re-elected unopposed
Ramsey	W.H. Alcock	Independent	1,688	70.3	Re-elected
Ramsey	F. Rome	Independent	713	29.7	
Rushen	R. Kneen	Manx Labour Party	1,590	20.2	Re-elected
Rushen	W.A. Kelly	Independent	1,421	18.1	Elected
Rushen	A. Qualtrough	Independent	1,291	16.4	Elected
Rushen	A. Moore	Independent	1,249	15.9	
Rushen	J.A. Qualtrough	Independent	916	11.7	
Rushen	J.S. Kermode	Independent	744	9.5	Unseated
Rushen	J.J. McArd	Independent	640	8.2	
Source: Sherratt
