= 1919 Manx general election =

General elections were held in the Isle of Man between 27 October and 6 November 1919. Independent candidates won a majority of seats in the House of Keys.

== Electoral system ==
The 24 members of the House of Keys were elected from 11 constituencies, which had between one and three seats.

Constituency	Electorate	Seats	Date of election
Ayre	2,231	3	31 October
Castletown	–	1	N/A
Douglas North	10,285	3	4 November
Douglas South	3,994	2	4 November
Garff	2,414	2	30 October
Glenfaba	2,617	3	27 October
Michael	1,395	2	31 October
Middle	3,295	3	30 October
Peel	2,180	1	6 November
Ramsey	2,961	1	4 November
Rushen	4,475	3	3 November
Source: Sherratt

== Campaign ==
A total of 47 candidates contested the elections; 28 independents, 11 from the Manx Labour Party, 5 from the National Party and three from the Liberal Party. There was only one candidate in Castletown, who was elected unopposed.

== Results ==
Party	Votes	%	Seats
Manx Labour Party	8,675	21.61	4
Liberal Party	6,412	15.97	2
National Party	4,733	11.79	1
Independents	20,326	50.63	17
Total	40,146	100.00	24
Registered voters/turnout	35,847	–	
Source: Sherratt

=== By constituency ===
Constituency	Candidate	Party	Votes	%	Notes
Ayre	W.C. Southward	Independent	922	27.4	Re-elected
Ayre	J.D. Clucas	Independent	884	26.3	Elected
Ayre	D.J. Teare	Independent	750	22.3	Elected
Ayre	R. Cain	Independent	548	16.3	
Ayre	S.W. Anderson	Independent	255	7.6	Unseated
Castletown	Joseph Davidson Qualtrough	Independent	–	–	Re-elected unopposed
Douglas North	S. Norris	Independent	2,469	17.7	Elected
Douglas North	R.C. Cain	Liberal Party	2,279	16.3	Elected
Douglas North	J. Cunningham	Liberal Party	2,105	15.1	Re-elected
Douglas North	R.B. Moore	Liberal Party	2,028	14.5	
Douglas North	C.T.W. Hughes-Games	National Party	1,484	10.6	
Douglas North	W.T. Pickett	Manx Labour Party	1,436	10.3	
Douglas North	M. Carine	National Party	1,339	9.6	Unseated
Douglas North	J. Garside	National Party	665	4.8	Unseated
Douglas North	W.G.G.T. Hargrave	Independent	176	1.3	
Douglas South	A.J. Teare	Manx Labour Party	1,131	30.2	Elected
Douglas South	J.L. Goldie Taubman	National Party	936	25.0	Re-elected
Douglas South	G.J. Burtonwood	Independent	808	21.6	
Douglas South	T.M.L. Quayle	Manx Labour Party	559	14.9	
Douglas South	J. Corkill	National Party	309	8.3	
Garff	J.R. Kerruish	Independent	776	27.6	Re-elected
Garff	T.S. Corlett	Independent	766	27.2	Elected
Garff	W. Dickinson	Manx Labour Party	669	23.8	
Garff	T. Crossley	Manx Labour Party	601	21.4	
Glenfaba	E. Callister	Independent	789	26.7	Re-elected
Glenfaba	F.S. Dalgleish	Independent	780	26.4	Re-elected
Glenfaba	G.B. Kermode	Independent	758	25.6	Elected
Glenfaba	W.P. Clucas	Manx Labour Party	632	21.4	
Michael	E.J. Curphey	Independent	502	43.0	Re-elected
Michael	R.S. Corlett	Independent	496	42.5	Re-elected
Michael	C. Gill	Manx Labour Party	170	14.6	
Middle	George Frederick Clucas	Independent	927	24.5	Elected
Middle	C. Gill	Independent	850	22.5	Elected
Middle	T.G. Bridson	Manx Labour Party	735	19.4	Elected
Middle	W.F. Cowell	Independent	706	18.6	Unseated
Middle	W. Christian	Independent	568	15.0	Unseated
Peel	Christopher R. Shimmin	Manx Labour Party	872	63.8	Elected
Peel	W.O. Quayle	Independent	494	36.2	
Ramsey	A.H. Teare	Independent	1,173	58.7	Re-elected
Ramsey	A. Hadley	Manx Labour Party	827	41.4	
Rushen	J.R. Corrin	Manx Labour Party	1,043	21.0	Elected
Rushen	J. Qualtrough	Independent	959	19.3	Re-elected
Rushen	A. Qualtrough	Independent	823	16.6	Re-elected
Rushen	W. Moore	Independent	814	16.4	
Rushen	J.J. Qualtrough	Independent	659	13.3	
Rushen	T.F. Quine	Independent	587	11.8	Unseated
Rushen	J. Cowley	Independent	87	1.7	
Source: Sherratt

== Aftermath ==
Following the elections, W.C. Southward (Ayre), J.R. Kerruish (Garff), J. Cunningham (Douglas North) and J. Qualtrough (Rushen) were elevated to the Legislative Council. By-elections were subsequently held for their replacements in mid-December:

Constituency	Candidate	Party	Votes	%	Notes
Ayre; 19 December	R. Cain	Independent	787	55.2	Elected
Ayre; 19 December	T.E. Kneen	Independent	639	44.8	
Garff; 18 December	W. Kermeen	Independent	736	55.9	Elected
Garff; 18 December	E. Oliver	Independent	580	44.1	
Douglas North; 19 December	R.B. Moore	Liberal Party	1,715	81.1	Elected
Douglas North; 19 December	W.T. Pickett	Independent Labour	399	18.9	
Rushen; 23 December	W. Moore	Independent	973	54.1	Elected
Rushen; 23 December	C.A. Cormode	Manx Labour Party	826	45.9	
Source: Sherratt
