= 1929 Manx general election =

General elections were held in the Isle of Man between 7 and 15 November 1929. Independent candidates won a majority of seats in the House of Keys.

== Electoral system ==
The 24 members of the House of Keys were elected from 11 constituencies, which had between one and three seats.

Constituency	Electorate	Seats	Date of election
Ayre	2,131	3	12 November
Castletown	–	1	N/A
Douglas North	8,095	3	13 November
Douglas South	–	2	N/A
Garff	2,332	2	13 November
Glenfaba	2,554	3	14 November
Michael	1,297	2	15 November
Middle	3,927	3	7 November
Peel	2,002	1	15 November
Ramsey	3,122	1	7 November
Rushen	4,543	3	12 November
Source: Sherratt

== Campaign ==
A total of 40 candidates contested the elections; 30 independents, eight from the Manx Labour Party and two from Independent Labour.

== Results ==
Party	Votes	%	Seats	+/–
Manx Labour Party	7,573	18.87	7	+1
Independent Labour	695	1.73	0	0
Independents	31,862	79.40	17	−1
Total	40,130	100.00	24	0
Registered voters/turnout	30,003	–		
Source: Sherratt

=== By constituency ===
Constituency	Candidate	Party	Votes	%	Notes
Ayre	D.J. Teare	Independent	925	23.8	Re-elected
Ayre	R. Cain	Independent	829	21.3	Re-elected
Ayre	A.J. Cottier	Independent	698	18.0	Elected
Ayre	J. Corlett	Independent	544	14.0	
Ayre	E.B.C. Farrant	Independent	493	12.7	
Ayre	C. Gill	Independent Labour	396	10.2	
Castletown	Joseph Davidson Qualtrough	Independent	–	–	Re-elected unopposed
Douglas North	A.B. Crookall	Independent	4,004	29.5	Re-elected
Douglas North	T.R. Radcliffe	Independent	2,795	20.6	Elected
Douglas North	J. Kelly	Manx Labour Party	2,568	18.9	Elected
Douglas North	S. Norris	Independent	2,564	18.9	Unseated
Douglas North	R.F. Fargher	Independent	857	6.3	
Douglas North	J.J. Cowley	Independent	802	5.9	
Douglas South	A.J. Teare	Manx Labour Party	–	–	Re-elected unopposed
Douglas South	W.C. Craine	Manx Labour Party	–	–	Re-elected unopposed
Garff	W.K. Cowin	Manx Labour Party	868	35.0	Re-elected
Garff	T. Callow	Independent	704	28.4	Re-elected
Garff	G.W. Filliter	Independent	595	24.0	
Garff	C.F. Corkhill	Independent	310	12.5	
Glenfaba	F.S. Dalgleish	Independent	950	31.5	Re-elected
Glenfaba	R. Kneen	Independent	929	30.8	Re-elected
Glenfaba	W.P. Clucas	Manx Labour Party	834	27.7	
Glenfaba	J. Duke	Independent Labour	299	9.9	
Michael	J.F. Crellin	Independent	742	46.5	Re-elected
Michael	T.H. Kneen	Independent	444	27.8	Elected
Michael	J. Callister	Independent	409	25.6	
Middle	C. Gill	Independent	1,872	31.3	Re-elected
Middle	George Frederick Clucas	Independent	1,664	27.9	Re-elected
Middle	W.F. Cowell	Independent	1,372	23.0	Re-elected
Middle	A. Radcliffe	Manx Labour Party	1,066	17.8	
Peel	Christopher R. Shimmin	Manx Labour Party	861	59.6	Re-elected
Peel	W.R. Irving	Independent	584	40.4	
Ramsey	W.H. Alcock	Independent	1,207	51.8	Elected
Ramsey	A.H. Teare	Independent	1,073	46.1	Unseated
Ramsey	L. Nelson	Independent	48	2.1	
Rushen	R. Kneen	Manx Labour Party	1,376	23.6	Elected
Rushen	J.S. Kermode	Independent	1,285	22.1	Elected
Rushen	W. Moore	Independent	1,120	19.2	Re-elected
Rushen	W.A. Kelly	Independent	1,118	19.2	
Rushen	A. Qualtrough	Independent	925	15.9	
Source: Sherratt
