= Graham Cregeen =

Manx politician

The Honourable Graham Derek Cregeen

Minister for Justice and Home Affairs
- In office 3 March 2020 – October 2021
- Chief Minister: Howard Quayle
- Preceded by: David Ashford
- Succeeded by: Jane Poole-Wilson

Minister for Education, Sport and Culture
- In office 4 October 2016 – 3 March 2020
- Succeeded by: Alex Allinson

Minister for Community, Culture and Leisure
- In office 12 July 2012 – 3 April 2014
- Preceded by: Tim Crookall
- Succeeded by: Chris Robertshaw

Member of the House of Keys for Arbory, Castletown and Malew
- In office 22 September 2016 – 12 August 2021

Member of the House of Keys for Malew and Santon
- In office 29 September 2011 – 21 September 2016
- Succeeded by: Constituency Abolished

Personal details
- Born: Graham Derek Cregeen
- Party: Independent

Graham Derek Cregeen is a retired Manx politician who served as Member of the House of Keys for Arbory, Castletown & Malew in the Isle of Man until 2021. He was Minister for Justice and Home Affairs from 2020 to 2021.

== Early life ==
Cregeen grew up in Port St Mary.

== Political career ==
In 2006 he was elected MHK for the former Malew and Santon constituency, and was re-elected for that constituency in 2011.

From 2006 to 2016 he was a political member of a variety of government departments in turn, and for a few weeks in 2012 he was Minister for Community, Culture and Leisure (a position that was abolished in 2014).

In 2016 he was elected MHK for the new Arbory, Castletown & Malew constituency, and appointed Minister for Education and Children. In 2017 the department was renamed as the Department of Education, Sport and Culture.

In 2020 he was appointed Minister for Justice and Home Affairs.

== Personal life ==
Cregeen lives in Ballasalla. He has two sons including Andrew Cregeen famous Manx basket baller. Graham can be seen walking his grandson Ted on Thursday nights and sometimes on a weekend.

== Election results ==
=== 2011 ===
2011 Manx General Election: Malew and Santon
Party	Candidate	Votes	%
Independent	Graham Cregeen	877	71.53%
Independent	Gareth Kelly	262	21.37%
Independent	John Hanson	87	7.1%
Total valid votes		1226	
Rejected ballots		21	1.68%
Registered electors		2,309	
Turnout		1247	54.01%

=== 2016 ===
In 2014, Tynwald approved recommendations from the Boundary Review Commission which saw the reform of the Island's electoral boundaries.

Under the new system, the Island was divided into 12 constituencies based on population, with each area represented by two members of the House of Keys.

As a result Cregeen's former constituency of Malew and Santon was abolished, with Santon becoming part of the constituency of Middle and Malew becoming part of the newly formed Arbory, Castletown and Malew.

2016 Manx General Election: Arbory, Castletown and Malew
Party	Candidate	Votes	%
Independent	Jason Moorhouse	1066	18.21%
Independent	Graham Cregeen	991	16.93%
Independent	Phil Gawne	972	16.6%
Independent	Stephen Crowther	950	16.23%
Independent	Carl Parker	890	15.2%
Independent	Richard McAleer	718	12.27%
Manx Labour Party	Carol Quine	267	4.56%
Total valid votes		5854	
Rejected ballots		11	0.14%
Registered electors		5,487	
Turnout		3268	59.56%
