= Isle of Man First =

- Leader: Mitch Sorbie
- Founder: Mitch Sorbie
- Founded: 25 September 2025
- Ideology: Right-wing populism Manx nationalism
- Political position: Right-wing

Website
- isleofmanfirst.com

Isle of Man First is a minor political party created on the Isle of Man to contest their 2026 general election by former UKIP candidate Mitch Sorbie to represent the interests of small businesses.

== Background ==
Mitch Sorbie worked as an engineer and driving instructor before buying two nightclubs in Cumbernauld and Kilmarnock in his native Scotland in 1994. He had stood in the 2011 Inverclyde by-election as a candidate for UKIP earning 288 votes or 1% of the electorate. Sorbie has stated "People brand me a racist for being associated with UKIP but it was not a racist party and that has never been who I am." Shortly after his defeat, Sorbie moved to the Isle of Man and opened a pizzeria.

Unlike Parliament in the United Kingdom, the Isle of Man's Tynwald has largely been an non-partisan institution, with political parties such as Liberal Vannin, the Isle of Man Green Party, and the Manx Labour Party failing to enter its lower chamber, the House of Keys, in any meaningful capacity. Labour made the first attempt to introduce party politics in 1918 peaking with the 1929 election with seven seats in the twenty four seat chamber. The Tynwald's independence is generally supported by Manx voters, especially younger ones, as better "representing local people on an independent level."

== History ==
The party was formally announced on September 25, 2025, with a manifesto releasing on October 2, 2025. The party aims to win 13 seats to the House of Keys in the 2026 general election with 24 candidates standing across the island to introduce meaningful party politics for the first time in the island's history. To this end Sorbie has stated that "there are a few serving MHKs who have expressed an interest" in joining the party and that "party politics is the only way we will accomplish anything on the island".

== Platform ==
A central point of their platform is that Manx civil servants have "too much power" and that power should instead be vested in the Tynwald. Sorbie's immediate focus is to reverse the decline of the hospitality industry, which he claims is due to the heightened minimum wage. The party also opposes digital ID cards in favour for a central database that only needs to be updated once. They also want to create a Manx sovereign wealth fund by swelling and centralising natural gas extraction. On immigration Sorbie said that "we do not know who is coming in and off the island. There will be some undesirables" but that "Immigration is important but those coming over here need to be net contributors."

Other policy positions as outlined in the party's manifesto include a “Tenant Purchase Scheme” to promote tenants buying their rented properties, preservation of Manx corporate tax as a tax haven, a flat structure to the Manx healthcare service and expanding the University College Isle of Man into a "global" institution.

== External link ==
- Isle of Man 1st
