= Craine =

Craine is a Manx surname. Notable people with the surname include:

- Anne Craine (born 1954), Minister for the Treasury for the Isle of Man
- Peter Craine (19??–2003), Manx politician
- John W. Craine Jr., United States Navy vice admiral
- Walter C. Craine (1877–1961), Manx politician and trade unionist
