= Isle of Man Labour Party =

Isle of Man Labour Party may refer to one of the following:

- Manx Labour Party, a political party in the Isle of Man
- Independent Labour (Isle of Man), a former political party in the Isle of Man
