= Arbory, Castletown & Malew =

House of Keys constituency

Arbory, Castletown & Malew is a House of Keys constituency in the south of the Isle of Man. It was created for the 2016 general election and elects 2 MHKs; currently Jason Moorhouse and Tim Glover.

== Elections ==
General election 2021: Arbory, Castletown & Malew
Party	Candidate	Votes	%
Independent	Jason Robert Moorhouse	1,988	33.0
Independent	Timothy Simon Glover	1,818	30.2
Independent	Stephen Raymond Crowther	1,488	24.7
Independent	Graham Derek Cregeen	730	12.1
Total votes		6,024	
Total ballots		3,379	
Rejected ballots		8	
Turnout		3,387	56.5
Registered electors		5,990	

General election 2016: Arbory, Castletown & Malew
Party	Candidate	Votes	%
Independent	Jason Robert Moorhouse	1,066	18.2
Independent	Graham Derek Cregeen	991	16.9
Independent	Phil Gawne	972	16.6
Independent	Stephen Raymond Crowther	950	16.2
Independent	Carl Parker	890	15.2
Independent	Richard McAleer	718	12.3
Manx Labour	Carol Quine	267	4.6
Total votes		5,854	
Total ballots		3,261	
Rejected ballots		7	
Turnout		3,268	59.6
Registered electors		5,487	
