= Ralph Peake =

Manx politician

Member of the House of Keys for Douglas North
- In office 22 May 2015 – 12 August 2021
- Monarch: Elizabeth II
- Governor: Richard Gozney

Personal details
- Born: 1962 (age 63–64)
- Party: Independent
- Spouse: Joanne Peake
- Children: 3

Ralph Peake is a former Member of the House of Keys (the lower house of Tynwald, the Isle of Man parliament) for Douglas North and candidate in the 2021 Manx general election. Peake served as a Member of the Island's Department of Environment, Food and Agriculture, Department of Health and Social Care, and Economic Policy Review Committee.

== Biography ==
He was elected for Douglas North in the 2015 by-election, receiving 604 votes. He was re-elected in the general election in 2016.

== Election results ==
=== 2015 ===
2015 By-Election: Douglas North
Party	Candidate	Votes	%
Independent	Ralph Peake	604	43.74%
Independent	David Ashford	554	40.12%
Independent	Marie Booth	223	16.15%
Total valid votes		1381	
Rejected ballots		4	0.29%
Turnout		1385	

=== 2016 ===
2016 Manx General Election: Douglas North
Party	Candidate	Votes	%
Independent	David Ashford	1219	32.07%
Independent	Ralph Peake	1177	30.97%
Independent	John Houghton	775	20.39%
Manx Labour Party	Lynn Sirdefield	343	9.02%
Independent	Karen Angela	287	7.55%
Total valid votes		3801	
Rejected ballots		11	0.14%
Registered electors		4,386	
Turnout		2172	49.52%
