= Noble's Hospital =

Hospital on the Isle of Man

Noble’s Hospital
- Manx Care
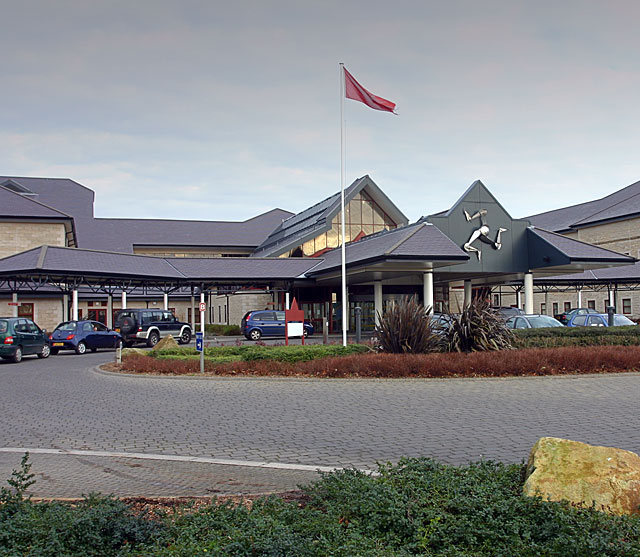
- The hospital entrance in 2006

Geography
- Location: Strang, Braddan, Isle of Man
- Coordinates: 54.1729°N 4.5084°W

Organisation
- Care system: Public
- Type: District General

Services
- Emergency department: Yes
- Beds: 314

Links
- Website: www.gov.im/categories/health-and-wellbeing/hospitals-and-emergency-treatment/nobles-hospital/

Noble's Hospital is a public hospital on the Isle of Man. It is one of only two hospitals on the island, and as of 1 April 2021, is run by Manx Care; having previously been run by the Department of Health and Social Care.

== History ==
In 1947, Noble’s Hospital had 137 beds with an average occupancy of 122 patients. The Cubbon Wing, for chronically sick patients, financed by the estate of the late Thomas Cubbon, was added in 1951. A new Nurses' Home was built in 1953. At the end of 1955, there was a waiting list for admission of 279 patients. Some patients had to be transferred to the White Hoe.

The hospital relocated in 2003 from its previous location at Westmoreland Road into a new building constructed on a greenfield site at the outskirts of the main town of Douglas.

In October 2022 Tynwald allocated £18.3 million to reduce waiting times in orthopaedics, general surgery and ophthalmology. Funding had already been provided for knee and hip, endoscopy, and cataract procedures.

== Facilities ==
The Noble’s Hospital has 20 wards and 314 beds. It has tertiary services which are handled by NHS trusts in the North West of England. The pharmacy budget, which also covers Ramsey and District Cottage Hospital, Mental Health Services, Hospice Isle of Man, Community Nursing, Chiropody, Family Planning, Dental Clinics and the School Health Advisors is £2,500,000.

It has been using the Medway (CareFlow) Patient Administration System provided by System C since 2007. It has an electronic document management system with more than 100,000 records. The electronic record system extends to mental health, community, GP and social care services. It is intended to remove paper records by the end of 2018.

In 2014 the West Midlands Quality Review Service found that the critical care department was underperforming with a "culture of blame".

The hospital has a Patient Experience and Quality Committee with 12 members which has led initiatives in raising awareness about the importance of hydration, patient safety, and infection control.

All beds at the hospital were replaced in 2019 as part of a £300,000 project to replace all hospital beds across the island's two hospitals.

In April 2019, a comprehensive independent review was conducted by Sir Jonathan Michaels. This review led to the recommendation and ultimately the formation of Manx Care. Manx Care, similar to the English NHS model of health care delivery is intended to provide health care at arms length to government.
