= MPPA =

MPPA may refer to:

- Massively parallel processor array, a type of integrated circuit
- Master of Public Policy and Administration, a multidisciplinary academic graduate degree
- MPPA Retail Group, an Indonesian retail company
- Methylphenylpropylamine (phenpromethamine), a nasal decongestant and stimulant
- Manx People's Political Association, a political party in the Isle of Man
