= James Robinson Corrin =

Manx politician

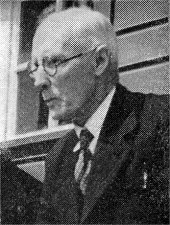
- Born: 1878; The Level, Rushen, Isle of Man
- Died: 21 September 1972 (aged 93–94)
- Political party: Manx Labour Party

James Robinson Corrin MBE (1878–1972) was a Manx politician and leader of the Labour party in Isle of Man in the early to mid 1900s.

== Career ==
Corrin was born to John Corrin and Elenor Gill in 1878 in The Level, Rushen, Isle of Man. Though trained as a carpenter, he became an accredited local lay Methodist preacher in 1898. He was a builder of boats and yachts.

He founded the Manx Labour Party in 1918. In 1919 he was elected one of four Labour MHK's representing Rushen. He served the Island in Tynwald on the legislative council from 1928 to 1964. As chairman of the Electricity Board (1931-1955), he helped bring electricity to the countryside of the Isle of Man. Though he was a pacifist in his early life, he became a member of the War Council in 1940.

He lived and died in the same home he was born in at the age of 94 on 21 September 1972.
