= Gawne (disambiguation) =

Gawne may refer to:

- GAWNE, an American rapper (born 1997)
- Gawne (surname)
- Gawne Nunatak, a mountain in Antarctica
- Riddle Gawne, a 1918 American silent Western film
