= Hazel Hannan =

Manx politician

Hazel Hannan, former Member of the House of Keys (MHK), was previously the Deputy Speaker of the House of Keys and an Education Minister and then Minister of Agriculture, Fisheries and Forestry in the Isle of Man Government. She was elected in 1986 as an independent MHK for Peel, after a failed attempt 5 years earlier standing for Mec Vannin. She is the President of Peel AFC.

She was defeated in the 2006 general election by Tim Crookall MHK. Manx Radio exit polls had the incumbent Hannan displaying an initial lead.

In 2016, Hannan was re-elected to the MHK for Peel.

== Early life ==
Hannan was born in Port Soderick, Isle of Man.

== Governmental positions ==
- Minister of Education, 1991–1995
- Minister of Agriculture, Fisheries and Forestry, 1995–1999

Preceded by Dr David Moore	MHK for Peel; 1986 - 2006	Succeeded by Tim Crookall
