= Jason Moorhouse =

Manx politician

Jason Moorhouse MHK

Minister for Infrastructure
- Incumbent
- Assumed office 16 October 2026

Member of the House of Keys for Arbory, Castletown & Malew
- Incumbent
- Assumed office 22 September 2016 Serving with Kirrie Jenkins

Personal details
- Born: United Kingdom
- Party: Independent
- Education: Keele University

Jason Robert Moorhouse is an English-born, Manx politician. He has been a Member of the House of Keys (MHK) for Arbory, Castletown & Malew since 2016.

== Career ==
He was elected in the 2016 Manx general election and re-elected in the 2021 Manx general election. In September 2026, he was re-elected as MHK for Arbory, Castletown and Malew and in October was appointed by Chief Minister Chris Thomas as Minister for Infrastructure.

== Elections ==
2016 Manx General Election: Arbory, Castletown & Malew
Party	Candidate	Votes	%
Independent	Jason Moorhouse	1066	18.21%
Independent	Graham Cregeen	991	16.93%
Independent	Philip Gawne	972	16.6%
Independent	Stephen Crowther	950	16.23%
Independent	Carl Parker	890	15.2%
Independent	Richard McAleer	718	12.27%
Manx Labour Party	Carol Quine	152	4.56%
Total valid votes		5854	
Rejected ballots		7	0.21%
Registered electors		5,487	
Turnout		3275	59.69%

2021 Manx General Election: Arbory, Castletown and Malew
Party	Candidate	Votes	%
Independent	Jason Moorhouse	1988	34.15%
Independent	Tim Glover	1818	31.23%
Independent	Stephen Crowther	1488	25.56%
Independent	Graham Cregeen	730	12.54%
Total valid votes		5821	
Rejected ballots		8	0.24%
Registered electors		5,990	
Turnout		3387	56.41%

2026 Manx General Election: Arbory, Castletown & Malew
Party	Candidate	Votes	%
Independent	Kirrie Jenkins	1839	28.72%
Independent	Jason Moorhouse	1481	23.13%
Independent	Stephen Crowther	1251	19.53%
Independent	Juan Christian	794	12.4%
Independent	Geofrey Sutcliffe	588	9.18%
Independent	Mark Firth	336	5.25%
Independent	Abigail Quirk	175	2.73%
Total valid votes		6404	
Rejected ballots		7	0.23%
Registered electors		6,140	
Turnout		3515	60.04%

== See also ==
- List of members of the House of Keys, 2016–2021
- List of members of the House of Keys, 2021–2026
