= Strang, Isle of Man =

Coordinates: 54.172°N 4.512°W

Strang: Manx: Strang
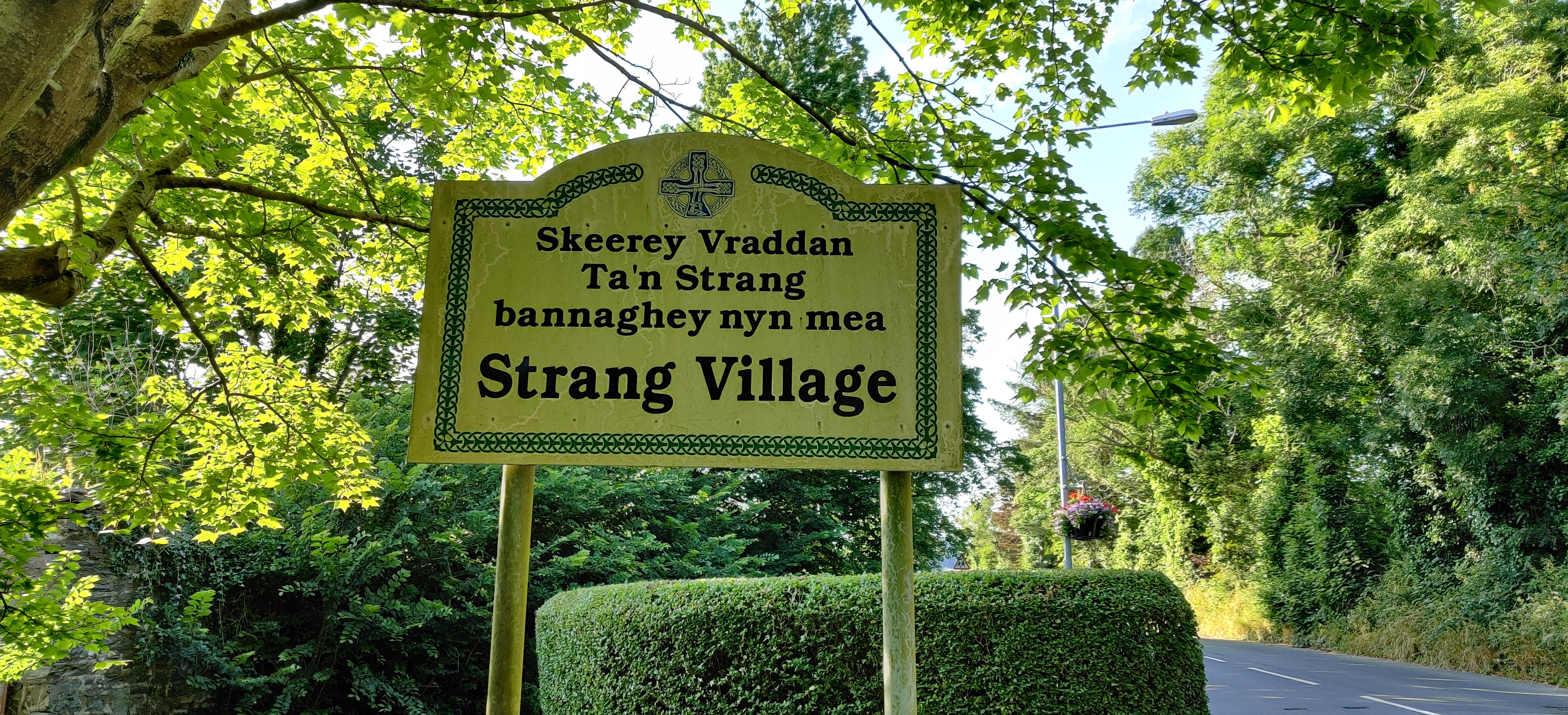
- Skeerey Vraddan; Ta'n Strang bannaghey nyn mea (English: Parish of Braddan (The) Strang welcomes you)

- Location within the Isle of Man
- Population: (2006 Census)
- OS grid reference: SC361781
- Parish: Braddan
- Sheading: Middle
- Crown dependency: Isle of Man
- Post town: ISLE OF MAN
- Postcode district: IM4
- Dialling code: 01624
- Police: Isle of Man
- Fire: Isle of Man
- Ambulance: Isle of Man
- House of Keys: Middle

Strang or The Strang (Manx: Strang) is a settlement within the parish of Braddan on the Isle of Man. It is almost contiguous with Douglas, the largest town on the island, and with the village of Union Mills. Nearby is Noble's Hospital, the island's only general hospital, sited on land which was originally purchased for an asylum in 1862, with completion in 1868, known as Ballamona Hospital.

== Facilities ==
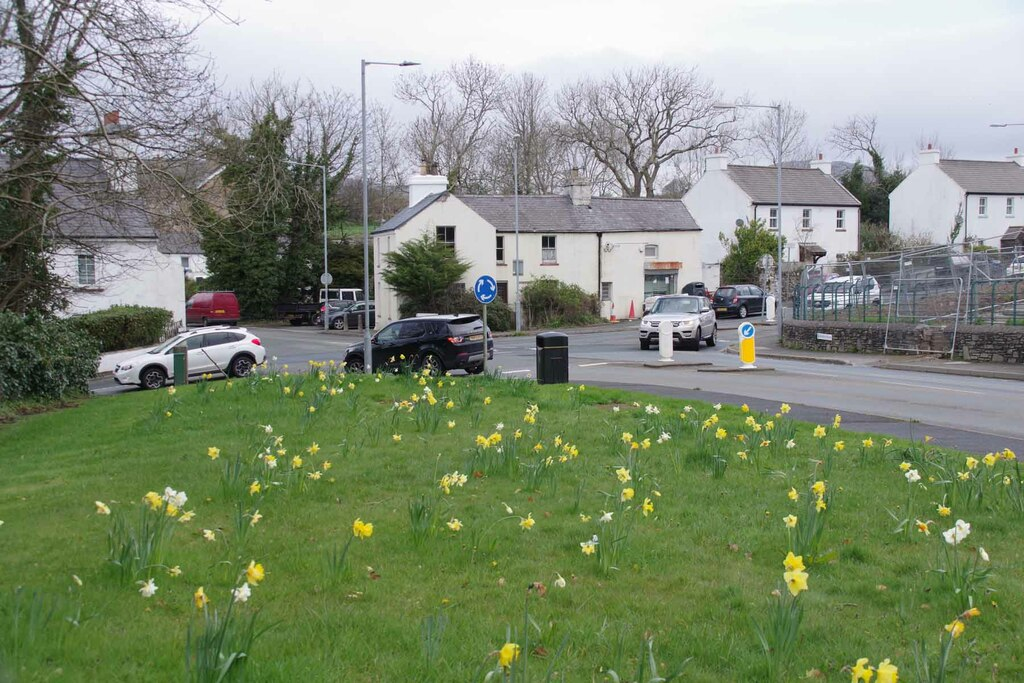
Roundabout in Strang

As of August 2021, some facilities within Strang can be found in the hospital, including shop and coffee shop. Cronk Grianagh park has the only concrete urban skatepark on the island, a BMX track and playground.

In 2017, Braddan Parish Commissioners sought expressions of interest in a proposed community centre to be built on the field opposite Strang Stores. Later that year, after interest was shown, the community centre was approved. The proposed facilities now housed in the complex include a café, sports hall, pharmacy, nursery and the local commissioners' offices. Construction was started in June 2021 and a state of the art community centre called The Roundhouse has been opened since January 2024

== Manx language use ==
The Manx language is seen in the names of various places within Strang. As in the rest of the Braddan and the Isle of Man as a whole, any place for which the name is not in Manx originally has a Manx translation on its signage. Another example of the use of the language is a sign along the main road through Strang, which states: "Skeerey Vraddan / Ta'n Strang bannaghey nyn mea" (English: Parish of Braddan / (The) Strang welcomes you), with the English words "Strang Village" displayed underneath.

== Heritage Trail ==
The Heritage Trail (known locally as "the Old Railway Line") briefly passes Strang near to the River Dhoo and Cronk Grianagh park.
