= Yn Pabyr Seyr =

2007 masthead

Yn Pabyr Seyr (lit. 'The Free Paper') is the newsletter of Mec Vannin, the Manx pro-independence organisation, and publicises their policies, views and comments.

It has been distributed at least twice a year since 1990. The archive of back-issues available on line is being updated on an ongoing basis. Although its title is in Manx, the majority of content is in English.

Its politics lean towards the left and include criticism of neo-conservative capitalism on the Isle of Man.
