= Walter C. Craine =

Manx politician (1877–1961)

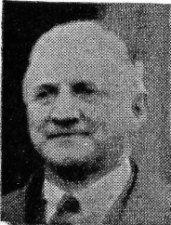

Walter Clucas Craine (1877 – 1961) was a politician and trade unionist from the Isle of Man. He was a long-time Member of the House of Keys and the first Labour mayor of Douglas. Outside politics he worked as a baker, commercial traveller and insurance agent.

In 1903 he became the treasurer of the Clarion Club.

In April 1908 Craine took part in setting up a branch of the Independent Labour Party on the Isle of Man. Soon after the foundation of the party branch, the party was able to get Craine elected as the Poor Law Guardian for Douglas Craine ran unsuccessfully for a seat in the House of Keys in the 1908 election as an Independent Labour candidate in Douglas. He agitated at many street meetings, and obtained 282 votes.

During the First World War, he served in the British Army in France and Salonika.

In 1919 he was elected to the House of Keys as one its first Manx Labour Party members. He was re-elected in 1924. In 1929 he ran unopposed. He remained a MHK until 1946. In 1938 he was successful in getting the Manx Divorce Act through Tynwald.

When the War Consultative Committee was set up in 1939, what has been referred to as the Isle of Man 'war cabinet', Craine was included as one of its seven members. He was one of three Manx Labour Party members of the committee, and one of five Members of the House of Keys.

Between 1937 and 1939 he served as mayor of Douglas. Craine also chaired the Isle of Man Asylum/Mental Health Board from 1937 to 1946.

In January 1946 Craine along with a fellow Labour MHK from Douglas, A. J. Teare, proposed a law that would have given Douglas two and Ramsey one additional seats in the House of Keys, which would have increased that House's number to 27. The proposal was narrowly rejected by the House. There were several other attempts at electoral reform in the subsequent years, and a redistribution similar to that proposed did go ahead in 1956. Craine was re-elected to the House of Keys in 1950, and would remain a MHK until 1956.

Craine was a long-time member of the Transport and General Workers' Union (T&G). In 1958 T&G awarded him its Gold Badge in recognition of his services to the union.

Craine served as the secretary of the Isle of Man Football Association and the Isle of Man Licensed Victuallers Association for many years.
