= Jack Nivison =

Manx politician

John Allen Cowell Kennedy Nivison CBE JP (22 March 1910 – 5 December 2003) was a Manx politician who served as President of the Legislative Council of the Isle of Man.

He was first elected as an MHK for Middle in 1948 and became a Member of the Legislative Council in 1962. He continued as a Member of the Council until his retirement in 1988, having completed 40 years of service. He was elected as the first ever President of the Legislative Council between 1980 and 1988. He was appointed a Commander of the Order of the British Empire in the 1979 New Year Honours.

He also served as Chairman of the Board of Social Security, in which role he was instrumental in carrying forward the National Insurance Reciprocal Agreement, also on the Airports Board, and the Tourist Board. He was also for some time, Chairman of the Isle of Man Branch of the Commonwealth Parliamentary Association.

Nivison was a man well recognised in the community, as well as in Tynwald, and he was greatly involved in many aspects of Island life, being the chairman of many a country eisteddfod, an Onchan Commissioner and Captain of the Parish of Onchan. The Onchan Stadium was renamed Nivsion Stadium in his honour in July 2004 with members of his family in attendance.

He was a founder member of the Onchan Silver Band and despite having put down his trombone early on, maintained very strong links with the band, latterly as its president, until his death. In 2004, the band created the "Jack Nivision Memorial Shield" awarded annually to a member of the band for their dedication and enthusiasm over the previous year.

== Government positions ==
- Chairman of the Board of Social Services, 1951-1976
