= George Moore (SHK) =

Manx merchant and statesman (1709–1787)

Sir George Moore (1709–1787) was a Manx merchant who was the Speaker of the House of Keys and their leader in the efforts to obtain better terms for Manx commerce after the Act of Revestment. It was largely due to his efforts that the island was not annexed to Cumberland as previously planned.

He was the son of Philip Moore (died 1746), who had also been a member of the House of Keys, and became a major merchant very heavily involved in the running trade and owned various vessels. He was also a partner in a Glasgow bank.

He was the first Chairman of the House of Keys to be called Speaker, holding the post from 1758 to 1780. He was knighted on 22 June 1781 in recognition of his services.

On his death in 1787 he was buried at Kirk Patrick and succeeded by his son Philip.
