= Positive Action Group =

Organization

The Positive Action Group (PAG) (Manx: Possan Jantys Jarrooagh) is a political pressure group formed on the Isle of Man in November 2006. They see that there should be three ‘core principles’ applying to the system of Government in the Isle of Man, namely open accountable government, rigorous control of public finances, and a fairer society for all. Towards this end they resolve that six steps be taken by November 2011 to implement these ‘core principles’:

1. The people to have the right to elect Legislative Council of the Isle of Man members: - before this is implemented, no MLC may become a minister.
2. The number of government ministries to be reduced.
3. The number of departmental members to be reduced.
4. Those members whose position has been lost to be diverted to backbench positions to provide proper scrutiny and to hold government to account.
5. An Independent Audit Commission to be set up (as recommended by the Commission of Inquiry into Mount Murray).
6. Independent Ombudsman scheme to be set up; and Tynwald to pass:-

- A Freedom of Information Act
- A Conflicts of Interests Act
- Bring into force the Human Rights Act 2001
