= Malew and Santon =

Coordinates: 54°07′37″N 4°37′21″W

Malew and Santon was a House of Keys constituency in the Isle of Man. The constituency was created in 1986. It elected one MHK and the constituency covered the parishes of Malew and Santon. This was slightly unusual since Malew and Santon are in different sheadings. The constituency was abolished in 2016.

== MHKs & Elections ==
Year	Election	Turnout	Candidates	Elected	Notes
1986	General Election	71.3%	Donald Gelling (695 votes); John Qualtrough (247 votes); WTK Corlett (189 votes); TS Duncan (181 votes)	Donald Gelling	
1991	General Election	66.3%	Donald Gelling (1087 votes); EW Williams (140 votes); FE Mitchell (64 votes)	Donald Gelling	
1996	General Election	Elected Unopposed	Donald Gelling	Donald Gelling	
2001	General Election	Elected Unopposed	Donald Gelling	Donald Gelling	
2002	By Election	72.9%	Captain Andrew Douglas (665 votes); Andrew Jessop (273 votes); Clive Davenport (154 votes)	Captain Andrew Douglas	Called following the elevation of Donald Gelling to the Council.
2006	General Election	60.2%	Captain Andrew Douglas (439 votes); Graham Cregeen (573 votes); Carol Kermode (258 votes)	Graham Cregeen	
2011	General Election			Graham Cregeen	
