= Annie Dorothy Bridson =

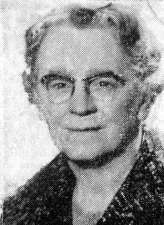
Annie Bridson was elected a Labour MHK for Garff in 1951.

Annie Dorothy Bridson (1893–1985) was a member of the House of Keys, Isle of Man, and the first woman president of the Manx Labour Party.

== Early life ==
Bridson was born at 17 Drinkwater Street in Douglas, the daughter of William Watterson and Catherine (née Pearson). Bridson attended Tynwald Street School, Hanover Street Girls' School, and then Eastern District Secondary School. She studied teaching at St Margaret's Hall, Ripon Training College (part of York Diocesan College).

== Career ==
Bridson began her career as a schoolteacher in Sheffield. In 1914, she returned to the Isle of Man, where she taught at Hanover Street Schools, served as head mistress of St Mark's School, and joined the Isle of Man Teachers' Association.

Attending the 1918 conference, Bridson was a founding member of the Manx Labour Party. In 1922 at age 29, she became the party's first woman president. During World War II, Bridson served in the Women's Royal Naval Service.

In 1951, Bridson was elected as the Member of the House of Keys (MHK) for Garff, becoming the second woman to sit in the House. She retired from politics in 1956.

== Personal life ==
In 1928, she married Thomas Gerald Bridson at Malew Church. They lived in Malew, Baldrine and then Douglas.
