= John Taubman =

Manx politician (1746–1822)

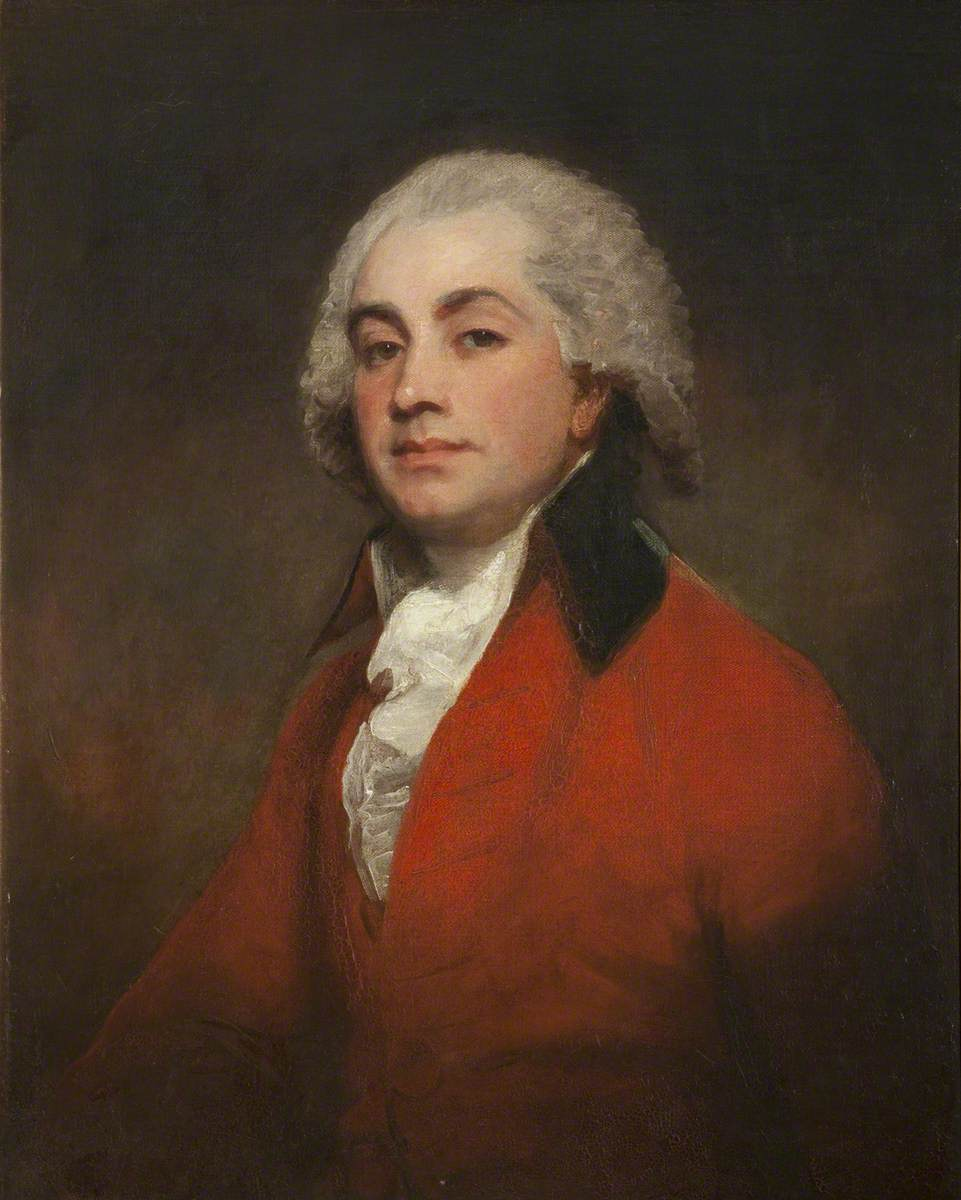
- John Taubman III (1746–1822), Portrait by George Romney, 1799

Speaker of the House of Keys
- In office 1799–1822

Personal details
- Born: 1746 Castletown, Isle of Man
- Died: 1822 (aged 75–76) The Nunnery, Braddan, Isle of Man
- Spouse: Dorothy Christian
- Occupation: Politician; military officer

Major John Taubman (1746–1822) was a Manx politician.

He was born in Castletown, Isle of Man, the son of John and Esther (née Christian) Taubman and entered the Manx Parliament, the House of Keys in 1799, following the death of his father. He served as Speaker from 1799 until his death in 1822.

In 1799, he raised the Douglas Volunteers, of which he was Major Commandant. He also served as Major of the Isle of Man Volunteers. Both were military groups created to defend the island in the event of an invasion by Napoleon's forces.

He died at his home, the Nunnery, in Braddan, Isle of Man on 1 Dec 1822 and was buried at Kirk Malew. He had married Dorothy Christian, daughter of John Christian, in 1774. Their daughter Dorothy married Colonel Mark Wilks, Governor of St Helena, who succeeded him as Speaker.
