= Act of Tynwald =

Statute in Isle of Man

An act of Tynwald is a statute passed by Tynwald, the parliament of the Isle of Man.

== Structure ==
Acts of Tynwald are structured in a similar format to Acts of the Parliament of the United Kingdom.

=== Commencement ===
Originally, each Act began with the following formula:

At a Tynwald Court holden at [town], the [day] Day of [month] in the [regnal year] Year of the Reign of our Sovereign Lord [king], by the Grace of God of Great Britain, France, and Ireland, King, Defender of the Faith, and so forth, and in the Year of our Lord [year in words], before the Most Noble [name of Duke], Duke of Atholl, Governor in Chief, the Council, Deemsters, and Keys of the said Isle.

In later Acts, this was modernised as follows:

At a Tynwald held at Douglas, Isle of Man, the day of [day and month] in the [regnal year] year of the reign of our Sovereign Lady Elizabeth the Second by the Grace of God of the United Kingdom of Great Britain and Northern Ireland and of Her other Realms and Territories Queen, Head of the Commonwealth, Defender of the Faith, and in the year of our Lord [year in words], before the Council and Keys.

Modern-day Acts now omit this formula altogether.

=== Long title ===
Each Act has a long title, which summarises the purpose of the statute. An example from a Customs Act is:

"An Act to consolidate with simplifications and amendments certain enactments relating to customs and excise etc.; and for connected purposes".

=== Enacting formula ===
The substantive provisions of the Act are preceded by an enacting formula, which is currently worded as follows:

Be it enacted by the King's [Queen’s] most Excellent Majesty, by and with the advice and consent of the Council and Keys in Tynwald assembled, and by authority of the same, as follows:

Until 1 January 2008, a longer form of words was used:

We, your Majesty's most dutiful and loyal subjects, the Council and Keys of the said Isle, do humbly beseech your Majesty that it may be enacted, and be it enacted, by the Queen's [King's] Most Excellent Majesty, by and with the advice and consent of the Council and Keys in Tynwald assembled, and by the authority of the same, as follows (that is to say):—

In earlier Acts, commencing with the revestment of the island to the British Crown, the following form was used:

We, therefore, your Majesty's most dutiful and loyal Subjects, the Governor, Council, Deemsters, and Keys of the said Isle, do humbly beseech your Majesty, that it may be enacted, and be it enacted, by the King's [Queen's] Most Excellent Majesty, by and with the Advice and Consent of the Governor, Council, Deemsters, and Keys of this Isle, in Tynwald assembled, and by the Authority of the same

== Short title and citation ==
In modern times, Acts of Tynwald have specified a short title by which they may be cited for convenience; e.g. "Isle of Man Constitution Act 1961". Acts from the 1970s onwards can also be cited by year and chapter number; e.g. "1990 c. 3".

In British legislation, Acts of Tynwald are cited by the short title, with the addition of the text "(An Act of Tynwald)"; similarly, British legislation is referenced in Manx law by the short title and "(An Act of Parliament)".

== Secondary legislation ==
The Isle of Man also has a form of delegated legislation, in the form of rules, orders and regulations made under authority of a particular Act of Tynwald. These can be either in an affirmative form (Tynwald must vote to bring them into effect), or a negative form (they will have effect unless one or more members of Tynwald seeks a vote on the matter).

== Printing ==
As of 2006, the government printer for Acts of Tynwald is The Copy Shop in Bucks Road, Douglas.

== See also ==
- List of acts of Tynwald
- Act of Congress
- Act of Parliament
