= Bill Shimmins =

Manx politician (born 1965)

William Shimmins

Member of the House of Keys for Middle
- In office 22 September 2016 – 21 August 2021
- Monarch: Elizabeth II

Personal details
- Born: 1965 (age 60–61) Scotland
- Party: Independent
- Children: 2
- Education: Glasgow College of Commerce

William 'Bill' Shimmins is a Scottish-born Manx politician. He represented the constituency of Middle in the House of Keys until 2021, having been first elected in 2016.

== Early life and education ==
Shimmins was born in Scotland in 1965 and educated at Hermitage Academy in Helensburgh, Clydebank Technical College and the Glasgow College of Commerce.

== Career ==
Throughout the 1980s and 1990s, Shimmins worked as a banker in the UK. He spent time with both Clydesdale and Yorkshire bank before becoming Managing Director of Northern Bank (Isle of Man) Limited in 2002.

In April 2006, Shimmins joined the NatWest group and from 2011 to 2016 served as Managing Director of Isle of Man Bank Limited and Island Director of RBS International.

== Politics ==
In 2016, Shimmins was elected to the House of Keys for the constituency of Middle along with incumbent Minister Howard Quayle. He received 33.5% of the vote.

In his 2016 manifesto, Shimmins stated that his priorities were economic growth, reducing the public pension deficit, reducing the size and scope of government and maintaining quality of life for residents.

He has also supported the development of brownfield sites, development of active travel routes and the introduction of a 5p plastic bag charge.

Shimmins indicated that he does not support independence for the Isle of Man and does not believe that the Chief Minister should be popularly elected.

Since his election Shimmins has served as a political Member for the Isle of Man Treasury with responsibility for the General Registry, Investment Management, Asset Management and the Audit (Consultative) Committee.

Mr Shimmins has served as Chairman of the Select Committee on Free Train and Tram Travel (Petition for Redress) 2016–2017, Member of the Select Committee of Tynwald on Financing of Infrastructure Schemes and Projects 2018–July 2018, Chairman of the Select Committee of Tynwald on Development of Unoccupied Urban Sites April 2018–November 2018 and Member of the House of Keys Committee on the Education Bill 2020 2020–2021.

== Election results ==
=== 2016 ===
2016 Manx General Election: Middle
Party	Candidate	Votes	%
Independent	Bill Shimmins	1357	33.54%
Independent	Howard Quayle	1205	29.78%
Independent	Paul Craine	1090	26.94%
Independent	WIlliam Bowers	394	9.74%
Total valid votes		4046	
Rejected ballots		11	0.48%
Registered electors		4,445	
Turnout		2307	51.9%

== Personal life ==
Shimmins lives in Glen Vine and is married to Alison, a primary school teacher. They have two adult children.
