= Gawne (surname) =

Gawne is a surname. Notable people with the surname include:

- Edward Moore Gawne (1802–1871), Manx politician
- Lauren Gawne, Australian linguistics researcher
- Luke Gawne (born 1997), American rapper
- Phil Gawne (born 1965), Manx politician and language activist
