= Tim Glover =

Manx politician

Tim Glover MHK

Member of the House of Keys for Arbory, Castletown & Malew
- Incumbent
- Assumed office 23 September 2021 Serving with Jason Moorhouse

Personal details
- Political party: Independent

Timothy Simon Glover is a Manx politician. He has been a Member of the House of Keys (MHK) for Arbory, Castletown & Malew since 2021.

== Career ==
He was elected in the 2021 Manx general election. In May 2023, he resigned from the Department of Infrastructure.

== See also ==
- List of members of the House of Keys, 2021–2026
