= Edward Moore Gawne =

Manx politician (1802–1871)

Edward Moore Gawne (1802–1871) was Speaker of the House of Keys in the Isle of Man.

Mr Gawne served as a Member of the House of Keys from 1829, at the relatively young age of 26, and became Speaker in 1854, following the death of his uncle. Having fought strenuously against the introduction of popular elections, Gawne oversaw what was, for him, the lowest point in the long and illustrious history of the Keys when the self-elected House was finally dissolved in 1867 and replaced by an elected body. He was offered a knighthood but turned it down. On his retirement from the Keys, he was presented with the antique Speaker's chair belonging to the House. In politics he was a Tory of the old school.

He was also Captain of the Parish of Rushen.
