= Peter Craine =

British baker and politician (1931–2003)

Peter Alfred Craine MHK

Member of the House of Keys for Douglas South
- In office 1976–1981
- Monarch: Elizabeth II
- Governor: John Warburton Paul
- Succeeded by: Adrian Duggan

Personal details
- Born: 30 November 1931 Douglas, Isle of Man
- Died: 5 January 2003 (aged 71) Isle of Man
- Party: Mec Vannin, then Manx National Party
- Spouse(s): June Taylor (1953–2003, his death)
- Children: 2
- Profession: Baker, politician

Peter Alfred Craine (30 November 1931 – 5 January 2003) was a Manx baker and politician who served as Member of the House of Keys (MHK) for Douglas South.

== Politics ==
He was originally elected with the Manx nationalist party Mec Vannin. In the 1976 election, they stood ten candidates and only Craine was successful. He is the only ever Mec Vannin MHK, although several ex-members later became MHKs. As an MHK, he held a number of posts in the Tynwald; he said he never turned a job down:

- Chairman of the Sea Fisheries Advisory Committee (1976–81)
- Chairman of the Assessment Board (1980-1)
- Vice-Chairman of the Manx Electric Railway Board (1976–81)
- Member of the Forestry, Mines and Lands Board (1976–80)
- Member of the Board of Agriculture and Fisheries (1976–81)
- Member of the Wild Life Park Committee (1976–81)
- Member of the Unemployment Committee (1980–81)

Craine successfully campaigned for the purchase of the Isle of Man Railway by the island government.

Craine subsequently left Mec Vannin, joining the short-lived breakaway Manx National Party which was formed in 1977 and after Craine lost the election in 1981 the Manx National Party soon ceased to exist. He unsuccessfully contested Douglas West the following year as an independent.

After he left the Tynwald, he was a councillor on the Douglas Corporation (1985-1992) and was Deputy Mayor of Douglas from 1991-2.

== Personal life ==
Craine was born in Douglas and attended Douglas High School for Boys. He married June Taylor in 1953, with whom he had a son, David, a daughter, Diane, and four grandchildren. David married Anne Valerie née Kerruish, the daughter of former President of the Tynwald and speaker of the House of Keys Charles Kerruish, in 1978; Anne was an MHK from 2003 to 11. Peter was a master baker and was interested in "sailing, photography, Manx and military history, railways, heavy horses, ornithology, rifle shooting and philately".
