= Manx People's Political Association =

Defunct political party in the Isle of Man

The Manx People's Political Association (MPPA) was a political party active in the Isle of Man. They first contested elections in the 1946 election to the House of Keys. They were formed as a conservative and anti-socialist alternative to the Manx Labour Party which was running a high-profile electoral campaign and had hopes of emulating the British Labour Party's success in the previous year's United Kingdom general election. They were similar in many ways to the previous National Party that had been active in Manx politics.

The MPPA fielded four candidates in Douglas and all were successful. This compared to the Labour Party, which had nominated 18 candidates and returned only 2 MHKs.

The MPPA withered as their MHKs stepped down from active politics, with subsequent conservatives preferring to contest elections as independents.
