= Marion Shimmin =

Manx politician (1879–1942)

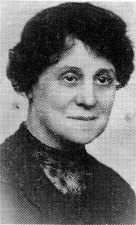

Member of the House of Keys
- In office 1933–1942
- Preceded by: Christopher R. Shimmin
- Constituency: Peel, Isle of Man

Personal details
- Born: Marion Fallows; 1879 Manchester, Lancashire, England
- Died: 1942 (aged 62–63) Isle of Man
- Party: Manx Labour Party
- Spouse: Christopher R. Shimmin (m. 1906, d. 1933)

Marion Shimmin (née Fallows; 1879 – 29 June 1942) was an English-born musician, educator, activist and Manx politician. She was elected in 1933 as the first woman member of the House of Keys (the lower house of the Isle of Man parliament), representing the constituency of Peel, Isle of Man.

== Biography ==
Marion Fallows was born in 1879 in Manchester, Lancashire, England. She was the daughter of James and Caroline Fallows and was the second of their five children. The family moved around Europe for her father's job, including a three-year stint in Łódź, Russian Empire (now in Poland). She played the fiddle and piano, studied classical music in Manchester and qualified as a teacher.

Shimmin began her career as a music teacher in Salford. Concerned about the plight of women living in poverty, particularly regarding domestic violence, she joined the Temperance movement and documented the poor living conditions in the Liverpool and Manchester slums.

Shimmin's family encouraged her to take a music opportunity in Vienna, Austria-Hungary, where in 1904 she met Christopher R. Shimmin. he was a Manxman and playwright who had also worked in the anti-poverty sector in Liverpool. They married on 17 September 1906 at St Aidan's Church in Bamber Bridge, Lancashire.

After their marriage, Shimmin and her husband settled in the fishing community in Peel, Isle of Man. They had two sons, John (Jack) Fallows Shimmin, who joined the Airforce, and Ffinlo Shimmin. Shimmin was active in the local community and she was a member of the Peel and District Women's Guild, the Peel Nursing Association, the Peel Hospital Committee and the Manx Temperance Federation. She was a member of Peel Wesleyan Methodist church and taught music at the school in Tynwald Road.

Shimmin and her husband were both interested in Manx history, Manx artistic culture and the context of the Isle of Man in the British Isles. They collected folk stories, examples of the Manx language and music, which informed the work of Yn Çheshaght Ghailckagh (The Manx Language society). She reportedly told her sons that she regretted not being born Manx.

Her husband Christopher R. Shimmin was elected member of the House of Keys for the constituency of Peel, Isle of Man for three times from 1919 onwards. He died in January 1933. Shimmin was elected unopposed at the subsequent by-election to the Peel seat, despite attempts being made to block her initial candidacy campaign. She was the first woman member of the House of Keys. Shimmin was re-elected in 1934 and served until her death. While in the House of Keys, Shimmin fought for social reform, was a member of the fisheries, health, insurance and pensions committees and was part of the education council. Both Marion and Christopher were MHKs representing the Manx Labour Party.

The Peel City Guardian reported that Shimmin was "a most intelligent and capable lady, if anything above the average standard of members of the present House [of Keys]."

Shimmin died on 29 June 1942.
