= Speaker of the House of Keys =

Presiding officer of lower house of Tynwald, the parliament of the Isle of Man

The Speaker of the House of Keys (Manx: Loayreyder yn Chiare as Feed) is the principal officer of the House of Keys, the lower house of the Isle of Man legislature. The Speaker is elected from the membership of the House at its first sitting after an election. He is responsible for controlling the procedure of the House and for the authoritative interpretation of its standing orders. He sets the business of the House and authorises the order of business of the House for each sitting. The Speaker uses the letters SHK after his name.

The Speaker is not entitled to speak in debates in the House, but is entitled to vote. If a vote is tied, convention dictates that he votes to continue debate or retain the status quo. However the Speaker is entitled to, and does, speak in debates in Tynwald Court.

All Speakers from 1750 to 1898 were members of either the Moore or the Taubman families or married into them. Until 1866, the Keys were unelected.

Before the House was first elected in 1867 the role of Speaker was assumed to be for life. Thus when Edward Moore Gawne resigned in 1867, he was the first Speaker not to die in office. Since then, although it is possible to resign the office, or nowadays even to fail to be re-elected, all Speakers died in office until Charles Kerruish in 1990, with the exception of John Robert Kerruish, who was elected to the Legislative Council in 1919. Since then none have died in office.

Speakers dress in the same official dress as the Speaker of the House of Commons: a black silk damask gold lace robe with full bottom wig for state occasions and a black silk gown for normal day business. The current robe was donated by the Speaker of the House of Commons in 1966 to commemorate the centenary of popular elections to the House of Keys.

On 27 September 2016, Juan Watterson was elected as Speaker, the youngest person to hold the office since John Senhouse Goldie-Taubman.

== Chairmen of the House of the Keys ==
- Richard Stevenson, c.1649–c.1660
- Edward Christian, c.1660–1673
- Charles Christian, 1673–1697
- Thomas Stevenson, 1697–1704
- John Stevenson, 1704–1738
- Thomas Heywood, 1738–1758

== Speakers of the House of Keys ==
- George Moore, 1758–1780
- John Taubman, 1780–1799
- John Taubman, 1799–1823
- Mark Wilks, 1823–1831
- Alexander John Goldie, 1831–1844
- John Taubman Goldie-Taubman, 1844–1847
- John Moore, 1847–1854
- Edward Moore Gawne, 1854–1867
- John Senhouse Goldie-Taubman, 1867–1898
- Arthur William Moore, 1898–1909
- Dalrymple Maitland, 1909–1919
- John Robert Kerruish, 1919
- George Frederick Clucas, 1919–1937
- Joseph Davidson Qualtrough, 1937–1960
- Henry Knowles Corlett, 1960–1962
- Charles Kerruish, 1962–1990
- George Victor Harris Kneale, 1990–1991
- James Crookall Cain, 1991–1996
- Noel Quayle Cringle, 1996–2000
- John David Qualtrough Cannan, 2000–2001
- Tony Brown, 2001–2006
- Steve Rodan, 2006–2016
- Juan Watterson, 2016-2026

== Recent elections ==
Year	Candidates	Votes	Elected
2021	Juan Watterson	unopposed	-
2016	Juan Watterson	unopposed	Juan Watterson
2011	Steve Rodan	unopposed	Steve Rodan
2006	Steve Rodan	10 votes	Steve Rodan
2006	David Cannan	7 votes	Steve Rodan
2006	Quintin Gill	6 votes	Steve Rodan
2001	Tony Brown	15 votes	Tony Brown
2001	David Cannan	9 votes	Tony Brown
2000*	David Cannan	11 votes	David Cannan
2000*	Tony Brown	10 votes	David Cannan
1996	Noel Cringle	unopposed	Noel Cringle
1991	James Cain	15 votes	James Cain
1991	Edgar Mann	9 votes	James Cain

*Following the election of Noel Cringle as President of Tynwald
