= Manx Labour Party =

Political party on the Isle of Man

Manx Labour Party Partee Obbraghys Vannin
- Leader: Joney Faragher MHK
- Chair: Sarah Maltby MHK
- Founders: Christopher R. Shimmin, Alfred James Teare, and James Robinson Corrin among others...
- Founded: 7 September 1918
- Headquarters: Douglas, Isle of Man
- Membership (2018): ▲45
- Ideology: Social democracy Historically: Manx nationalism (Note: Starting in the 1920s the MLP adopted a nominally Manx nationalist position, routinely opposing the importation of English workers and calling on members to fly the Manx flag in support of the party, however, this position was slowly phased out in the late 1960s and early 1970s following the emergence of Mec Vannin, out of fear of splitting the vote with an overtly nationalist party.)
- Political position: Centre-left
- Colours: Red
- House of Keys: 2 / 24
- Legislative Council: 0 / 11
- Douglas City Council: 3 / 12
- Onchan District Commissioners: 2 / 7

Website
- www.manxlabour.com

The Manx Labour Party (MLP; Manx: Partee Obbraghys Vannin) is a political party on the Isle of Man that was founded in 1918. The party emerged as a major political force on the island, on the cusp of winning a majority in the House of Keys until a wipeout in the 1946 election. The party was the first time partisan politics had been introduced on the island, as its legislature, the Tynwald had historically been a non-partisan organ of independents with several anti-socialist parties forming to challenge the MLP such as the National Party and the Manx People's Political Association.

== Policies ==
The Manx Labour Party published a manifesto of its positions in 2021. Some key planks included: taking a loan for the creation of ‘fit-for-purpose social housing’, the ‘banning of off-island speculation in the Manx housing market’, ‘increasing education spending to a minimum of 4% of GDP’ and the ‘trialling of free public transport with an aim to expand across the whole service in future’. It also voiced opposition to privatisation of the healthcare sector, and supported increasing the statutory minimum wage.

== Background ==
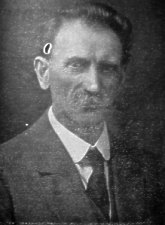
Christopher R. Shimmin was a Manx playwright who was one of the co-founders of the Manx Labour Party holding a seat in the House of Keys from 1919 until his death in 1933.

The United Kingdom's Labour Party was founded in 1900 by the Trades Union Congress (TUC) as the Labour Representation Committee (LRC) to support union endorsed candidates, with the aim of overturning Taff Vale Rly Co v Amalgamated Society of Rly Servants which essentially outlawed striking. Voters gave the Liberals a landslide with 397 seats out of 664 while the new LRC won 29 seats with the LRC renaming itself "The Labour Party" with the two parties agreeing to support each other by not running candidates against each other. The bolstered Labour held a party conference in 1907 in Belfast seeking to expand their presence across the whole of the U.K., becoming more involved in Scotland, Wales, and Ireland while also abandoning staunch Marxist Socialism in favor of a more pragmatic approach. However, in the following decade the party would retreat, viewing Irish politics as too divergent from the rest of the U.K. due to the Home Rule movement, as well as a significant intra-party split over support of World War I. On February 6, 1918, parliament would pass the Representation of the People Act which greatly expanded the electorate, enfranchising all men and most women and spelled the end of the Liberal Party, with Labour seeing a surge of support among the working class to become one of the two major parties in the U.K. This resulted in Labour taking a renewed interest in expanding outside of England namely to regions such as the Isle of Man.

The Isle of Man had long been a hub of Chartists printing presses which started in the 1840s, as the island's censorship laws where far more lenient than Great Britain, nor did the Island have a tax-stamp for printed goods making it far cheaper to print there. For example the noted Chartist writer James Bronterre O'Brien relocated to the Isle of Man full time writing for papers such as the National Reformer and Manx Weekly Review of Home and Foreign Affairs. The Independent Labour Party had opened a Manx chapter by 1908, running a single candidate in that year's election to the House of Keys, Walter Clucas Craine, who earned 282 votes, but lost the election. Craine would go on to win a seat in the 1924 election for the Manx Labour Party.

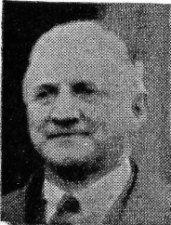
Walter C. Craine stood as the "first Labour candidate" on the Isle of Man, running in 1908 for the Independent Labour Party. He would go on to be elected a Labour MHK in 1924.

Prior to 1917 the only Labour union on the isle was a local branch of the Dockers Union in Douglas when a branch of the Workers' Union was opened on the Isle which operated a "bread strike" starting in 1918 in opposition to continued involvement in World War I. Bread production on the island at the time was dictated by the war effort, with bread being prioritized for soldiers on the front, instead of locals at home, resulting in supply shortages that left many going hungry with bread being priced out of the diet of many of the working class especially after the government cut bread subsidies. Shortly after that strike workers on the Isle of Man Railway also organized a union. The immediate catalyst for the creation of a Manx Labour Party would be when an Old Age Pension bill, despite unanimous support among the House of Keys, was vetoed by Governor Raglan who was vehemently opposed to unions operating on the island. Alfred Teare, founder of the local branch of the Workers' Union, would attempt to raise the issue of pension reform directly to the Home Secretary Winston Churchill who responded that the matter must be taken up with Raglan. Due to this perceived government hostility or inaction towards reforms the Unions on the island began to form their own branch of the Labour Party. The bread strike started on 4 July and forced Governor Raglan to cancel the 1918 Tynwald Day ceremony. Raglan eventually backed down over the bread subsidy, and subsequently left the Island on long term sick leave. Teare was described in 1918 as ‘the most powerful man on the Island.’

== History ==
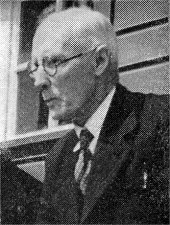
J. R. Corrin was the inaugural President of the Manx Labour party at its founding in 1918, and elected an MHK in 1919.

On 7 September, 1918, the Manx Labour Party held its first annual conference, where it was decided the existing local chapter of the Independent Labour party would merge with the growing unions on the island into a concerted political force. The party's founders were John Coole, William Clucas, J. R. Corrin, William Dickinson, Harry M. Emery, James D. Fell, Annie Watterson, Christopher Shimmin, Alfred James Teare, Richard Kneen, James H, Cowley, J. J. Hodson, J. W. Cannell, Arthur Hadley and Nellie Taylor. Its formation was prompted by the high level of indirect taxation as a proportion of the Isle of Man Government's income, the relatively low wages, and the lack of social legislation. The founders of the party saw that as being unfair to the poorest in society and wanted to increase the reliance on income taxation instead, and to introduce social legislation such as old age pensions. Christopher R. Shimmin, a founder of the MLP, had written in 1915; "In Manxland there is no state insurance, no worker's compensation, no factory laws, and for the aged worker, when poor and feebly tottering to the grave, no old age pension. Rightly has the Isle of Man been called "A paradise for the rich but a purgatory for the poor". Besides the Chartists and unions, various reforming organisations such as the Manx Reform League, and a culture of debating societies and self-education societies focused around the Island's various churches also joined the party. Like similar parties in neighbouring countries, the MLP's influences were more Methodist than Marxist.

=== Initial success (1919–1946) ===
==== 1919 election ====
The immediate focus of the newly formed Labour Party was to enshrine the concessions given to the 1918 bread strike into law, as well as passing long-awaited pension reforms. However, cracks quickly began to emerge among Labour's coalition, especially as more militant Marxists refused to join the new Labour Party, instead opting to continue to support the Independent Labour Party, with that party opening various chapters across the island in the build-up to the election. Regardless the party campaigned hard, spreading the 'gospel' of socialism out of Douglas' Temperance Hall and seeing significant break-through in Rushen due to the prominence of the tourism industry there, and the participation of the Rushen Progressive Association within the Labour Party. The party would stand in two by-elections to the House of Keys following the deaths of George Moore and Robert Moughtin, two MHKs from Douglas, standing Teare and J. R. Corrin with both losing their respective races. Regardless, the party pressed ahead to the general election in November, standing 11 candidates across the island on a platform of pension reform, opening of more asylums and hospitals, a national housing scheme, the abolition of the island's Poor law, the creation of an industrial council and the abolition of local school boards in favor a single body across the island. Four Labour candidates would win election, including Teare in Douglas South, Gerald Bridson in Middle, Christopher Shimmin an incumbent MHK which joined the Labour party was re-elected in Peel, and J. R. Corrin won a particularly 'lively' campaign in Rushen that saw seven candidates stand. The party's nomination and support of Bridson in middle, a rural constituency without an industrial base nor union presence, divided the party, however, his opposition was so sure of winning that they barely even campaigned while Labour held numerous rallies bussing in speakers from Douglas and other urban centers while also being greatly helped by the constituency adopting universal suffrage just before the election. The party also initiated a tradition where the candidates would be carried on supporters shoulders from their pre-election rally to the local polling place at the front of a procession of banners.

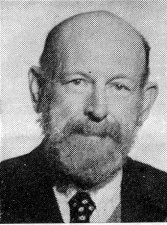
Gerald Bridson was elected MHK of the rural Middle sheading in 1919 despite the lack of an urban center and significant trade union presence.

As this was the first time that MHKs were elected to the Tynwald with a party affiliation, there was a significant effort by the anti-Labour opposition to have them removed from their seats for various legal reasons, however, each of these efforts failed with the opposition instead focusing on defeating Labour in the following elections in 1924. Despite this, in 1920 the new Tynwald started a programme of social reform. In 1920 Old Age pensions were introduced, a National Health Insurance Act was passed, a new Education Act was passed, and a school medical service established. In 1921 a Shop Hours Act was passed, and a winter works scheme was set up, to do works such as building promenades. Unemployment was higher in winter as most of the tourist industry, agriculture and fishing work was in the summer season. From 1922 to 1924 a housing programme was extended across the Island. One key area of unemployment was in returning World War I veterans, with a Labour initiative being spearheaded with the island forming a "29th Division" as a pseudo-military formation to work as labourers on government projects. The party also played a major role in governmental "direct action" in purchasing of surplus and blocking the export of potatoes when the 1920 crop failed to prevent a famine. Due to the efforts of the Labour Party in the House of Keys, the Isle of Man was largely 'immune' from the waves of strikes in England through the late 1910s through the 1920s and into the early 1930s, with only three major strikes during that time in 1920, 1928, and 1935. During the 1920 strike The White Palace, a major ballroom in Douglas, would burn to the ground resulting in significant debate on its owners behalf to ship in scab workers from England to circumvent the strike to rebuild the palace, it was around this time that the Manx Labour Party started to take a pro-Manx and anti-English attitude. In April 1920 the party held a massive rally to "show the flag" urging its supporters to more visibly display the Manx flag publicly as opposed to the Union Jack.

==== 1924 election ====
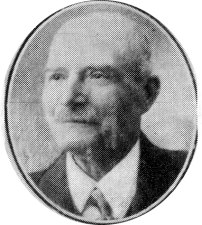
William Clucas would be elected MHK for Glenfaba in 1924.

The party stood fewer candidates in the 1924 election, mostly in urban centers, consisting of the four MHKs elected in 1919, alongside several new candidates; Walter K. Cowin for Garff, William Clucas for Glenfaba, John Kelly for Douglas North and Walter Craine in Douglas South. Teare suffered from an alleged corruption scandal that he dispelled where his opponent argued he was over-paying his staffers at twice the typical rate. Of the sitting MHKs all but Bridson would be re-elected, while three new candidates would also be elected, Cowin, Clucas, and Craine. The party also made a significant in-road among the middle class and shop-owners, convincing them that higher wages meant increased turnover in their shops.

One of the major labour issues on the island following the election would be in 1926 when the Isle of Man Highway Board attempted to renege on a 1923 agreement with its unionized workers, with pressure from Labour MHKs proving vital to preserving the wage agreement. Labour now had some political capital in the House of Keys to push through worker-friendly legislation, including a 1924 committee to form an island-wide industrial board and a 1927 "Labour Organisation Bill" to establish a nine-man "Board for the Prevention of Unemployment." However, not all of the party's initiatives where successful. From 1925 to 1926 the Labour Party, in conjunction with the teachers union, presented a scheme to make public school compulsory which was rejected by the education board. At around this time the party also unsuccessfully challenged the right of the Manx governor to vote in the House of Keys due to his opposition to a law that would've made it easier to enlarge roads for cars. In 1928 the party successfully passed the "Widows, Orphans and Old Age Pensions Bill" which would've enshrined many of the 1918 strike concessions, including a cap on the price of flour, pensions for the disadvantaged, and a new income tax to pay for these pensions. Despite the bill passing through the Tynwald the Home Office refused to give it royal assent into law until it was amended to offer more protections to business owners, and exclude pensions for childless widows or widows of those not covered by an insurance provision.

==== 1929 election ====
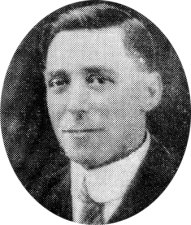
John Kelly unsuccessfully stood in the 1924 election, and was elected an MHK in 1929 losing re-election in 1934.

The 1929 election proved to be Labour's high water mark as the party achieved its largest share of the House of Keys as John Kelly, who had unsuccessfully stood for Douglas North in the prior election ran again, bringing their total to seven seats while Richard Kneen replaced J.R. Corrin who was appointed to the Legislative Council. However, the party's foundational cracks again started to show, as the party devolved into two groups, members affiliated with the Workers' Union, and those that weren't. Labour's vote base was becoming less and less militant with each concession the party achieved in the House of Keys, while leadership remained just as radical as they'd ever been. However, in 1929 the Workers' Union would be absorbed into the Transport and General Workers' Union (TGWU), effectively undercutting any support their backed candidates in the House of Keys received. The 1929 stock crash put strain on the Labour movement nationwide, while the Manx party struggled to stay afloat.

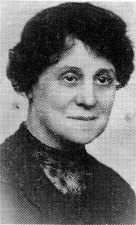
Marion Shimmin was the first woman ever elected to the House of Keys in 1933 when she was unanimously appointed to fill her recently deceased husbands seat.

The party was able to plateau their support to avoid a decline through personal allegiances to party founders such as Shimmin, Teare, and Corrin. William Clucas and Christopher Shimmin would both die in 1933, in Shimmin's case his widow Marion was unanimously elected to fill his seat until the 1934 election, becoming the first female member of the House of Keys, but in Clucas' case his seat was deemed by the party as a 'rural area' and no replacement was named, remaining vacant until the election where Labour did not contest it.

==== 1934 election ====
Besides the loss of Clucas' seat, John Kelly also lost his seat in Douglas North, with the party shrinking to just five seats, as the party failed to break any new ground in rural parts of the Island. In 1935 a strike would break out as negotiations between the Manx Employers' Federation and the TGWU broke down for demanding 48s for a 48-hour work week, but then increased their demand involving a rise of 8s for workers in Douglas and 10s on the rest of the island which the Federation rejected. The strike was largely popular among the island's residents, much like the 1918 strike, as it centered around improving workers’ standard of living. Teare also lead this strike, albeit reluctantly and resigned as secretary of the TGWU on Man in July mostly due to chaffing with Union leadership in Liverpool over how militant the strike should be. Although the strike would succeed in its demands for increased pay, anti-strike legislation would go into effect in 1936 that granted the Governor 'emergency powers' to implement 'penalized intimidation' on strikers. During World War II from 1936 to 1945 the government would routinely raise wages across the island to prevent another strike, as the economy in Man flourished with the construction of military aerodromes.

Both the Labour Party and local unions agreed in principle to support the war effort and avoid any strikes during the war. However, a split would form between Teare and J.R. Corrin, as the latter was a pacifist opposed to war in general, and was elected chairman of the Employers' Federation in 1941, holding the office until 1945. Meanwhile, on the mainland, the 1945 general election was a landslide victory for Labour, as such, the Manx Labour party had high hopes of finally getting a majority in the House of Keys in 1946.

=== 1946 wipeout ===
Unlike the mainland elections in the Isle of Man would be delayed until May 1946. This would be one of the greatest times of MLP activity on the island, as the party contested all but one of the by-elections leading up to the general election. Following the resignation of Thomas Callow in 1942 facilitated the return of Birdson to the House of Keys as a member of the Independent Labour Party, and following Marion Shimmin's death later that year the party lost the by-election for her replacement to George H. Moore, an independent. However, Kelly would win a seat in Douglas North when an independent was elevated to the Legislative Council.

Labour fielded 18 candidates across the island's 11 constituencies, then a record, however, suffered an election wipe-out. The party's platform was focused on the abolition of plural voting and support of government regulation on traditional industries for greater pay and conditions. Only two candidates would win, veteran Alf Teare in South Douglas, and Richard Kneen in Corrin's stronghold of Rushen. Between the 1945 general election and 1946 Manx election an anti-socialist party, the Manx People's Political Association (MPPA) emerged, backed by the Employers' Federation, which won 4 seats in 1946, becoming the largest party. The MPPA also had backing from several prominent members of the MLP including Annie Birdson and George Higgins, and where able to split the MLP's vote base to prevent them from having any 'safe' seat.

Despite this set back the national Labour party implemented various reforms on the island, such as the National Insurance Act, National Health Service Act and Education Act. In 1949 dock workers and bus drivers threatened another all-out general strike with the TGWU that was averted at the last minute by successful negotiations. However, in response to the wipe-out the party stopped campaigning on any policy of nationalisation. This was formalised in 1994 when the party changed Clause IIIb of its constitution, the party's equivalent to Clause IV of the UK Labour Party. While the original version of Clause IIIb called for the 'common ownership of the means of production', the 1994 rewrite called for the party 'to promote the political, social, and economic emancipation of the people of the Isle of Man and to fight against social injustice and intolerance.' In 1950 and 1951 Kneen and Teare would join Corrin in the legislative council further weakening the party's presence in the House of Keys. The party also won a by-election for Middle in 1948 following the resignation of Clifford Kniverton with MLP candidate Jack Nivison being elected at the age of 36.

=== Rebound (1951–1966) ===
==== 1951 election ====
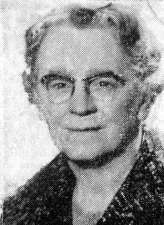
Annie Bridson was elected a Labour MHK for Garff in 1951.

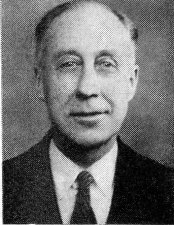
George Taggert was elected a Labour MHK for Douglas South in 1951.

1951 saw a major rebound for the Labour party. 10 MLP candidates stood in eight of the nine constituencies with the party winning six seats to the House of Keys. New Labour MHKs included: George Taggart in Douglas South, Annie Bridson in Garff, Robert E. Cottier in Peel, and Cecil C. Mcfee in Rushen joining Craine and Nivison. The six MHKs and 3 MLPs made this the largest Labour delegation to the Tynwald in the party's history, however, the opposition was firmly in charge of both chambers.

Trade unionism flourished, by 1953 the Isle of Man was sending 35 delegates across 12 unions to the Trades Union Congress (TUC) with 4,000 TUC affiliated workers across the island. However, the major issue on the island was constitutional and electoral reform, with the Tynwald passing the first seat redistribution since 1891 in early 1956. The tourist industry also declined, with the island again relying on fishing and light industry, further strengthening the MLPs hold on the electorate.

==== 1956 election ====
With constitutional reform all but guaranteed in the lead up to the 1956 election, the key campaign issue turned to the island's economic health. Just before the election laws where passed limiting the governor's power and reforming the Legislative Council to have less power over the House of Keys. Anti-Socialist independents called for subsidies for the fishing industry and agriculture, as well as relaxing licensing hours increased incentives for light industry while the MLP was mostly focused on a platform of a publicly owned and integrated national transport system, and an overhaul to the government's employment policy. This was arguably the first time there was a serious 'left-right' debate across the whole isle of man during an election as the Tynwald had historically been non-partisan and Labour had strengthened its position to run in most if not all constituencies as opposed to their urban core.

Mcfee, Nivison, and Taggart won re-election, while Bridson and Cottier lost their re-election bids and two new MLP MHKs where elected Robert C. Stephen in Douglas South and J. Edward Callister in Douglas North. Meanwhile, a faction of "Independent Progressives" also arose due to the MLPs lack of economic focus, with three of them being elected to the House of Keys. Between 1958 and 1962 there would be five by-elections across the island, one to replace George Taggart who died in 1958, being succeeded by fellow member of the MLP T. Albert Corkish, while the party also saw the election of George C. Gale in Peel bringing the party back up to 6 MHKs.

==== 1962 election ====
The 1962 election was delayed by three months to give the Tynwald more time to implement constitutional reforms, as there was serious debate on the removal of deemsters from the Legislative Council, the full transfer of Gubernatorial power to the Tynwald, while the MLP focused on the abolition of the property vote. Nivison would vacate his seat to be appointed to the Island's executive council being replaced by an independent, while Stephens chose to run as an Independent Labour outside of the MLPs authority. Mcfee, Callister, Corkish and Gale won re-election while Eric R. Moore was the only new MLP MHK being elected for Garff.

By the 1960s the Manx Labour Party started to view its founders and unions wholly as a 'traditional institution' with their leaders having given a lifetime of public support. Many Labour politicians at the time still remembered the 1918 strike and 1919 election which became steeped in Manx Labour tradition.

In 1962 and 1964 Mcfee and Gale where appointed to the Legislative Council, with the MLP not even contesting their seats which were filled by Independents. By this point the party was transforming to be almost exclusive to the boundaries of Douglas as older leadership in other parts of the island stepped down. Stephen would die in 1964 with the MLP contesting his seat and winning with the election of John J. Bell.

=== 1966 wipeout ===
The immediate issues of the 1966 election would again be constitutional changes including changing the role of the Speaker of the House, and the composition of the executive and legislative councils. The MLP would also organize against low taxes, arguing that it was a scheme to attract English immigrants and also called for nationalization of the Isle of Man Steam Packet Company. The election also saw the first contest of the new Mec Vannin party which took a stringently pro-Manx nationalist stance, undercutting a key Labour demographic. Nine MLP candidates would stand, but support for elder leaders could only go so far as Labour's aging leadership and electorate died or stepped away, young recruits where hard to find.

Only Edward Callister and Albert Corkish won re-election, seeing the party be unrepresented outside Douglas for the first time since its foundation. There would be five by-elections between 1966 and 1971 that where all won by independents, including in Douglas South.

=== Stagnation (1966–2006) ===
==== 1971 election ====
The party would continue to limp along, struggling to find an identity besides increasing social welfare. The party only stood five candidates, their lowest since foundation. Mcfee attempted to return to the House of Keys from the Legislative Council, standing for his old seat in Rushen but lost. Albert Corkish also lost his seat. Only two MLP members where elected as MHKs and both of them where political freshmen, 59-year old W. Alexander Moore in Douglas North and 68-year old Edmund Ranson in Middle, having run there for the party in the three prior elections.

However, in the four by-elections after the 1971 election the MLP would win two seats, E. Matthew Ward in Douglas South, and Edmund G. Lowey in Rushen. In the mean time the Isle of Man accepted a "special relationship" with the European Community, which had objected to the Tynwald's undemocratic upper chamber, with the Tynwald removing the deemster's seat. In 1976 the isle of man passed an amendment to the Representation of the People Act which introduced election deposits and residential qualifications. The party infamously refused to back the campaign to end birching on the Island instead defending the practice.

Additionally, Manx nationalism, which saw a massive revival in the 1960s, saw support from younger members of the party, however, was opposed by senior leadership who phased the position out of the party, partially due to the rise of Mac Vannin.

==== 1976 election ====
The 1976 election would be dominated by Mac Vannin's attempt to confront the Tynwald to maximize the island's autonomy demanding proportional representation and the regionalization of local government. The MLP meanwhile campaigned on a national minimum wage, and increased redundancy payments and protection against unfair dismissal and unequal pay as inflation and unemployment soared. Mac Vannin stood more candidates than Labour for the first time ever, at 10 and 5 respectively. Three of the four MLP incumbents won re-election, with the exception of Ranson in Middle. This, however, would be the last time Mac Vannin would seriously contest an election, as the party split along right-left political lines by 1977, with Labour seeing an influx of former voters returning to the party in the aftermath.

The MLP also won one of the by elections after the general election with G. Arthur Quinney barely winning by just 7 individual votes in Douglas North against the Manx National Party (the right-wing split of Mac Vannin). Additionally, the Tynwald sought to strip the remaining powers of the governor away and to have the Tynwald elect the chair of the Executive Council, but no progress was made on local regionalism.

==== 1981 election ====
The 1981 election would be dominated by political independents as the MLP no longer had the capacity or commitment to field candidates outside of their strongholds in Douglas and Rushen, standing just three candidates, their lowest ever. The strategy however paid off, as the MLP won all three of these races. The party would also win two of the by elections, first with Peter Karren in Middle, and secondly with David Cretney in Douglas South. Bernard May would win election to Rushen in a 1985 by-election.

==== 1986 election ====
Massive electoral reforms where passed in the lead up to the 1986 election, implementing a single transferable vote and redistributing all seats into 15 constituencies. At the same time the TGWU took a more militant stance under the leadership of Bernard Moffatt in response to Thatcherism. The MLP stood 6 candidates seeking to re-establish itself in Peel. Their manifesto was very similar to those of progressive independents, nor where they distinct in their emphasis on employment and housing. Cretney, May, and Karren all won re-election to the Greater Douglas region. In 1987 the party backed a TGWU one-day general strike across the island, which was broken up by police under orders of the Island's high court. In 1988 the party voted against a motion supporting liberalization of the law on homosexuality and shortly after won a by-election with Richard Corkill being elected to represent Onchan.

==== 1991 election ====
A period of general economic prosperity and political peace, there was increased investment towards tourism and Manx heritage, and the attraction and retention of high-value industry and financial services. In-fact, the biggest debate on the island at the time was that the island's government was spending too much money subsidizing the economy. The MLP chose to only stand their three sitting MHKs for the election; Cretney, Karren, and May, with all of them winning re-election. The MLP also began to see pressure from the Manx Green Party which first contested elections in 1991.

==== 1996 election ====
The 1996 election saw the return to first-past-the-post voting with unequal voting rights. The MLP only stood three candidates, Cretney and Karren, alongside Alan Cowley with May running as Independent Labour in Willaston, although he did win the endorsement of the local Labour branch in the district the island-wide party refused to endorse him due to his participation in the executive. He would come in a distant third place. Cretney meanwhile won re-election with 78% of the vote, Karran also won re-election while Cowley failed to win a seat. May would win back support of the party to stand in a by election in 1998, although he would narrowly lose.

=== Recent history ===
In the 2001 election, the party polled the highest percentage of votes (17.3%) among the parties standing, and two of its three candidates won seats. However, independent candidates won the vast bulk of the votes and seats at the election, and the political pressure group, Alliance for Progressive Government, won more seats (three), despite getting a smaller share of the vote (14.6%).

The Manx Labour Party has had continuous influence in Tynwald while it had members there, as MLP members were appointed as ministers and board chairmen as a matter of course. This is part of the Island's manner of politics which has usually been based on coalition and consensus in modern times, with most Tynwald members having some administrative responsibility.

The Liberal Vannin Party was founded by Peter Karran who was, until 2004, a Member of the House of Keys for the Manx Labour Party.

David Cretney was the only Manx Labour Party candidate to successfully stand in the 2011 general election.

In March 2013 Michael Ronald Coleman, who had previously failed in his bid to be popularly elected to the House of Keys in the 2006 general election (16.3% of the poll), was made a member of the Legislative Council.

Since 2015 former MHK David Cretney was a member of the Legislative council, giving the party its second seat, until his tenure ended in February 2020.

Michael Coleman's tenure ended in February 2018, leaving David Cretney as the party's sole representative, until his tenure ended in February 2020.

In 2018 Manx Labour was a founding member of the Isle of Man Climate Change Coalition following the IPCC report of that year calling for urgent action.

Joney Faragher was elected as the new leader and Sarah Maltby as the new Chair of the Manx Labour Party on Saturday 27 June 2020.

== Election results ==
=== Local government ===
The party's electoral renaissance began in October 2020 when Devon Watson and Samuel Hamer won both available seats in the Derby Ward by-election for Douglas Borough Council.

Derby Ward by-election, 15 October 2020
Party	Candidate	Votes	%
Manx Labour	Devon Watson (elected)	305	62.2
Manx Labour	Samuel Hamer (elected)	251	51.2
Independent	Amanda Walker	230	46.9
Liberal Vannin	Alan Buck	95	19.4
Majority		54	11.0
Turnout		490	19.6
Rejected ballots		5	1.0

The 2021 Local Authority elections were contested by Devon Watson, Samuel Hamer and Peter Washington in Douglas and Fenella Logan in Onchan. Devon Watson and Peter Washington were elected to Douglas Borough Council, and Fenella Logan was elected as an Onchan Commissioner.

=== House of Keys ===
House of Keys
Election	Votes	%	Seats
1919	8,675	21.61%	4 / 24
1924	12,744 ▲	28.0% ▲	6 / 24
1929	7,573 ▼	18.9% ▼	7 / 24
1934	12,072 ▲	23.9% ▲	5 / 24
1946	18,860 ▲	31.46% ▲	2 / 24
1951	19,164 ▲	33.3% ▲	6 / 24
1956	6,632 ▼	16.8% ▼	5 / 24
1962			5 / 24
1966			2 / 24
1971			2 / 24
1976			3 / 24
1981			3 / 24
1986			3 / 24
1991	3,419 ▲	11.23% ▲	3 / 24
1996	5,392 ▲	10.36% ▼	2 / 24
2001	4,261 ▼	9.1% ▼	2 / 24
2006	2,561 ▼	5.0% ▼	1 / 24
2011	1,749 ▼	3.1% ▼	1 / 24
2016	773 ▼	1.4% ▼	0 / 24
2021	3,006 ▲	5.1% ▲	2 / 24
2026	2,849 ▼	4.9% ▼	2 / 24

== Notes ==
1.There was no contest in South Douglas. The two Manx Labour candidates were elected unopposed.
