= 2016 Manx general election =

- 22 September 2016

All 24 seats in the House of Keys
- Turnout: 52.96%
	First party	Second party
Party	Independents	Liberal Vannin
Seats won	21	3
Seat change	▲1	Steady
Popular vote	52,202	3,597
Percentage	92.98%	6.36%
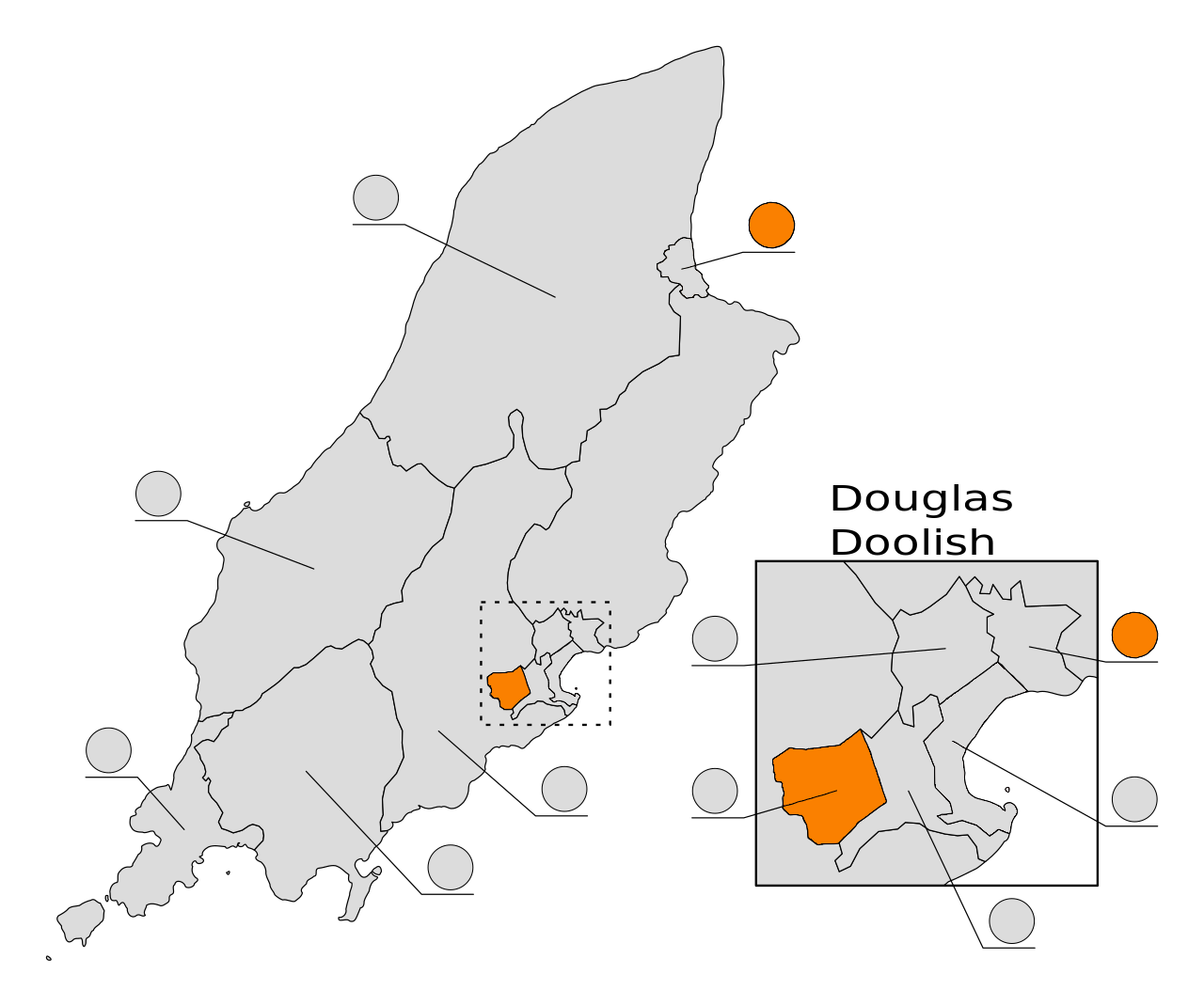
- Most voted-for candidate represented by the colour of the constituency. Second most voted-for candidate represented by the additional circle.
Chief Minister before election
Allan Bell
Independent
Elected Chief Minister
Howard Quayle
Independent

General elections were held in the Isle of Man on 22 September 2016. Independents won 21 of the 24 seats in the House of Keys. A record number of women were elected (5, or 21% of the House).

== Electoral system ==
Following changes to the electoral system ahead of the elections, the 24 members of the House of Keys were elected from 12 constituencies, each returning two members. Previously, constituencies had varied in size, with some electing one, two or three members. The election used a multiple non-transferable vote system in each constituency, where voters had two votes (with the option to cast only one) to fill the two available seats.

== Results ==
Party	Votes	%	Seats	+/–
Liberal Vannin Party	3,597	6.36	3	0
Manx Labour Party	773	1.37	0	–1
Independents	52,202	92.28	21	+1
Total	56,572	100.00	24	0
Valid votes	31,635	99.62		
Invalid/blank votes	122	0.38		
Total votes	31,757	100.00		
Registered voters/turnout	59,963	52.96		
Source: Government of the Isle of Man

=== By constituency ===
Arbory, Castletown & Malew
Candidate	Party	Votes	%	Notes
Jason Moorhouse	Independent	1,066	32.69	Elected
Graham Cregeen	Independent	991	30.39	Elected
Phil Gawne	Independent	972	29.81	
Stephen Crowther	Independent	950	29.13	
Carl Parker	Independent	890	27.29	
Richard McAleer	Independent	718	22.02	
Carol Quine	Manx Labour Party	267	8.19	
Total		5,854	100.00	
Valid votes		3,261	99.79	
Invalid/blank votes		7	0.21	
Total votes		3,268	100.00	
Registered voters/turnout		5,487	59.56	

Ayre & Michael
Candidate	Party	Votes	%	Notes
Alfred Louis Cannan	Independent	1,839	57.74	Elected
Timothy Simon Baker	Independent	1,572	49.36	Elected
Carlos Phillips	Independent	1,358	42.64	
Louise Elizabeth Whitelegg	Independent	638	20.03	
Alan Kermode	Independent	440	13.81	
Patrick Stephen Ayres	Liberal Vannin Party	39	1.22	
Total		5,886	100.00	
Valid votes		3,185	99.78	
Invalid/blank votes		7	0.22	
Total votes		3,192	100.00	
Registered voters/turnout		4,884	65.36	

Douglas Central
Candidate	Party	Votes	%	Notes
Christopher Charles Thomas	Independent	1,571	66.31	Elected
Catherine Anne Corlett	Independent	1,031	43.52	Elected
Kurt Buchholz	Independent	632	26.68	
John Richard George Falk	Independent	540	22.79	
Sarah Dawn Andrea Hackman	Independent	342	14.44	
Michelle Kim Inglis	Independent	95	4.01	
Total		4,211	100.00	
Valid votes		2,369	99.66	
Invalid/blank votes		8	0.34	
Total votes		2,377	100.00	
Registered voters/turnout		4,890	48.61	

Douglas East
Candidate	Party	Votes	%	Notes
Claire Louise Bettison	Independent	561	32.94	Elected
Christopher Roy Robertshaw	Independent	487	28.60	Elected
Jonathan Joughin	Independent	480	28.19	
Quintin Bennett Gill	Independent	415	24.37	
Amanda Jane Walker	Independent	373	21.90	
Catherine Rose Turner	Independent	324	19.03	
John Caley McBride	Independent	303	17.79	
Richard Frederick Halsall	Manx Labour Party	163	9.57	
Total		3,106	100.00	
Valid votes		1,703	99.88	
Invalid/blank votes		2	0.12	
Total votes		1,705	100.00	
Registered voters/turnout		4,251	40.11	

Douglas North
Candidate	Party	Votes	%	Notes
David John Ashford	Independent	1,219	56.20	Elected
George Ralph Peake	Independent	1,177	54.26	Elected
John Ramsey Houghton	Independent	775	35.73	
Lynn Sirdefield	Manx Labour Party	343	15.81	
Karen Angela	Independent	287	13.23	
Total		3,801	100.00	
Valid votes		2,169	99.86	
Invalid/blank votes		3	0.14	
Total votes		2,172	100.00	
Registered voters/turnout		4,386	49.52	

Douglas South
Candidate	Party	Votes	%	Notes
Kathleen Joan Beecroft	Liberal Vannin Party	1,134	63.00	Elected
William Mackay Malarkey	Independent	952	52.89	Elected
Keith Daryl Fitton	Independent	767	42.61	
David Anthony Fowler	Independent	296	16.44	
Total		3,149	100.00	
Valid votes		1,800	99.56	
Invalid/blank votes		8	0.44	
Total votes		1,808	100.00	
Registered voters/turnout		4,496	40.21	

Garff
Candidate	Party	Votes	%	Notes
Martyn John Perkins	Independent	1,767	70.40	Elected
Daphne Hilary Penelope Caine	Independent	1,270	50.60	Elected
Andrew Joseph Smith	Independent	1,247	49.68	
Andrew Barton	Independent	346	13.78	
Nigel Anthony Dobson	Independent	231	9.20	
Total		4,861	100.00	
Valid votes		2,510	99.48	
Invalid/blank votes		13	0.52	
Total votes		2,523	100.00	
Registered voters/turnout		5,069	49.77	

Glenfaba & Peel
Candidate	Party	Votes	%	Notes
Raymond Karl Harmer	Independent	2,195	67.31	Elected
Geoffrey Boot	Independent	1,805	55.35	Elected
Leslie Hanson	Independent	1,238	37.96	
Total		5,238	100.00	
Valid votes		3,261	99.27	
Invalid/blank votes		24	0.73	
Total votes		3,285	100.00	
Registered voters/turnout		5,886	55.81	

Middle
Candidate	Party	Votes	%	Notes
William Cato Shimmins	Independent	1,357	59.10	Elected
Robert Howard Quayle	Independent	1,205	52.48	Elected
Paul Herbert Craine	Independent	1,090	47.47	
William Edward Bowers	Independent	394	17.16	
Total		4,046	100.00	
Valid votes		2,296	99.52	
Invalid/blank votes		11	0.48	
Total votes		2,307	100.00	
Registered voters/turnout		4,445	51.90	

Onchan
Candidate	Party	Votes	%	Notes
Rob Edward Callister	Independent	1,272	52.22	Elected
Julie Marie Edge	Liberal Vannin Party	953	39.12	Elected
Timothy Roy Craig	Independent	841	34.52	
David John Quirk	Independent	822	33.74	
Anthony Allen	Independent	510	20.94	
Total		4,398	100.00	
Valid votes		2,436	99.55	
Invalid/blank votes		11	0.45	
Total votes		2,447	100.00	
Registered voters/turnout		4,997	48.97	

Ramsey
Candidate	Party	Votes	%	Notes
Alexander John Allinson	Independent	2,946	84.53	Elected
Lawrie Lee Hooper	Liberal Vannin Party	1,471	42.21	Elected
Leonard Ian Singer	Independent	886	25.42	
Nicholas Lyndon Crowe	Independent	716	20.55	
John David McDonough	Independent	236	6.77	
Total		6,255	100.00	
Valid votes		3,485	99.57	
Invalid/blank votes		15	0.43	
Total votes		3,500	100.00	
Registered voters/turnout		5,726	61.12	

Rushen
Candidate	Party	Votes	%	Notes
Juan Paul Watterson	Independent	2,087	66.04	Elected
Laurence David Skelly	Independent	1,212	38.35	Elected
Mark Ian Kemp	Independent	1,104	34.94	
James William Hampton	Independent	1,033	32.69	
Leo Simon Cussons	Independent	331	10.47	
Total		5,767	100.00	
Valid votes		3,160	99.59	
Invalid/blank votes		13	0.41	
Total votes		3,173	100.00	
Registered voters/turnout		5,446	58.26	
