= Mec Vannin =

Nationalist political party in the Isle of Man

- President: Bernard Moffatt
- Founded: 1962
- Newspaper: Yn Pabyr Seyr
- Ideology: Manx nationalism Social democracy Republicanism; Environmentalism
- Political position: Centre-left to left-wing
- Colours: Green
- House of Keys: 0 / 24
- Legislative Council: 0 / 11

Website
- mecvannin.im

Mec Vannin (lit. 'Sons of Man') is a political party operating in the Isle of Man. Formed in 1962, it seeks to revoke the status of Man as a British self-governing Crown dependency and establish a completely sovereign state, which would be a republic.

It describes its aims as being:

To achieve national independence for Mann as a sovereign state, based on a republican form of government. To further and safeguard the interests of Mann. To protect the individual and collective rights of its people.

—

It is alternatively called or subtitled "The Manx Nationalist Party", but is not to be confused with the Manx National Party, which was a name used by another party.

== History ==
Mec Vannin was formed in 1962 and has held minuted meetings since February 1964.

Mec Vannin's growth can be considered to be directly parallel to the Isle of Man's status as a tax haven. In particular, they have campaigned against immigration to the island, particularly from England. This featured in their 2008 platform and policy:

"In a small island nation such as ours, in default of policies to control the growth of the finance sector, policies to control the size of the population are essential for the achievement of economic, ecological and cultural sustainability. The rapid and unnatural population increase, due to an open door policy on immigration, has increased the burden on the island's infrastructure and environment whilst eroding the fabric of community life. As a result, Mec Vannin believes the immediate introduction of immigration controls to be a priority."

The party stated in the 1980s that it was concerned with "the prospects of our survival as a nation, as a distinct Celtic community in its own right and with its own identity and independence".

In the 1976 election Mec Vannin put up ten candidates. Only one was successful though, Peter Craine. He remains the only person to have been a Mec Vannin Member of the House of Keys (MHK), although several ex-members have gone on to become MHKs, such as Treasury Minister Allan Bell, Phil Gawne and Hazel Hannan. Peter Craine subsequently left the party, joining the short-lived breakaway Manx National Party which was formed in 1977 and disbanded in 1981.

They participated in the 1981 election also, in the Peel constituency.

=== Additional policy ===
Mec Vannin's environmentalist policies include opposition to overuse of fossil fuels. They support further decentralisation of power within the island, to local councils.

Other policies include:

- "Manx nationality must be defined by legislation and a Manx passport introduced, with Manx nationality being first citizenship. Whilst all residents would be eligible for Manx citizenship upon the introduction of legislation, subsequent new residents could only become citizens after due process of naturalisation. Only Manx citizens would be eligible to vote or to stand for representative public office."
- On customs union:
  "The right to determine indirect taxation, including VAT."

=== Yn Pabyr Seyr ===
Distributed at least twice a year since 1991, Yn Pabyr Seyr The Free Paper is the newsletter of Mec Vannin, publicising their policies, views and comments. The archive of back-issues available on line is being updated on an ongoing basis. Its name means "The Free Paper" in Manx, but the majority of content is in English.

== Office holders ==
- President: Bernard Moffatt

== See also ==
- Manx Independence Movement
