= Manx National Party =

The Manx National Party (Manx: Partee Ashoonagh Vannin) was an offshoot of Mec Vannin, a nationalist party in the Isle of Man. Divisions within Mec Vannin caused the split in 1977, and the single Mec Vannin member of the House of Keys (Peter Craine) transferred his loyalties to the new party. When Craine ceased to be an MHK in 1981 the Manx National Party soon ceased to exist.
