= Middle (sheading) =

Sheading of the Isle of Man

Coordinates: 54°10′37″N 4°33′36″W

Middle Medall
- Sheading
- Sheading of Middle
- Crown dependency: Isle of Man
- Parishes: Braddan, Marown, Onchan, Santon
- City: Douglas

Area
  - Total: 121 km^{2} (47 sq mi)
  - Rank: 1

Population (2021)
  - Total: 42,089
  - Density: 348/km^{2} (901/sq mi)

Middle (Manx: Medall) is one of the six sheadings of the Isle of Man.

It is located on the east of the island (part of the traditional South Side division) and consists of the four historic parishes of Braddan, Marown, Onchan and Santon. Historically, from 1796 until 1986 Marown was in the sheading of Glenfaba, and before 1796 Onchan was in the sheading of Garff.

In addition to the current districts listed above, the sheading of Middle also includes the borough of Douglas, the capital and only city in the Isle of Man.

Other settlements in the sheading include Port Soderick, Strang, Tromode and Union Mills (all in the parish of Braddan), Braaid, Crosby and Glen Vine (all in the parish of Marown), and Newtown in the parish of Santon.

In 2021 the sheading of Middle (including Douglas) had a verified population of 40,089.

== MHKs and elections ==
It is also a House of Keys constituency. Originally, in the 19th century, the constituency included the whole of the sheading (excluding Douglas), and elected 3 members. In the more recent period up to 2011 it elected one MHK, but the constituency excluded Santan, which was in the Malew & Santon constituency. In 2016 the constituency included Santan, and elected two MHKs.

This information is incomplete.

Year	Election	Turnout	Candidates	Elected
1903	General election	Unopposed	Arthur William Moore, elected; Dalrymple Maitland, elected; William Hutchinson, elected	
1908	General election	Unopposed	George Frederick Clucas MA, elected; ?; ?	
1913	General election	?	William Frederick Cowell, elected; ?	
1919	General election	?	William Frederick Cowell; George Frederick Clucas MA SHK, elected; Charles Gill JP, elected; ?	
1924	General election	?	?	Charles Gill; William Frederick Cowell
1929	General election	?	?	Charles Gill
1933	By-election	?	?	John Cowin
1934	General election	?	?	John Cowin; Charles Gill
1935	By-election	To replace Charles Gill		Thomas Clucas
1948	By-election	?	?	Jack Nivison
1951	General election	?	?	Jack Nivison
1956	General election	?	?	Jack Nivison
1958	By-election	?	?	Harold Cain
1962	General election	?	Jack Nivison, elected; John Creer, elected; Harold Cain; ?	
1962	By-election	Called following the elevation to the LegCo of Jack Nivison.		Harold Cain
1966	General election	?	?	Lt Col Peter Spittall
1971	General election	?	?	Lt Col Peter Spittall
1981	General election	?	Peter Karran; Roger Alan Payne, elected	
1985	By-election	?	Peter Karran, elected; ?	
1986	General election	67.4%	Brian Barton (495 votes, elected); CB Hampton (391 votes); PJ Irving (305 votes); A Kelly (112 votes)	
1988	By-election	?	David North (696 votes, elected); CB Hampton (391 votes); JT Daugherty (63 votes)	
1991	General election	67.6%	David North (924 votes, elected); JJ Wood (518 votes); PA Want (159 votes); B Walker (58 votes)	
1996	General election	47.7%	David North (842 votes, elected); Gerrard Corfield (519 votes)	
2001	General election	56.85%	George Martyn Quayle; Allen Gawne; Graham Crowe; Paul Beckett	George Martyn Quayle
2006	General election	57.7%	Kathleen Joan Beecroft (Liberal Vannin); Andrew Charles Richard Jessop; George Martyn Quayle	George Martyn Quayle
2011	General election	56.1%	Juan Richard Stephen Cottier; Paul Herbert Craine; George Martyn Quayle; Robert Howard Quayle	Robert Howard Quayle

== Election results since 2016 ==
In 2014, Tynwald approved recommendations from the Boundary Review Commission which saw the reform of the Island's electoral boundaries.

General election 2021: Middle
Party	Candidate	Votes	%
Independent	Jane Pearl Poole-Wilson	1,788	42.0
Independent	Stuart Gordon Peters	965	22.6
Independent	Alison Ruth Lynch	792	18.6
Independent	Keiran Francis Hannifin	553	13.0
Independent	David Anthony Fowler	163	2.8
Total votes		4,261	
Total ballots		2,410	
Rejected ballots		7	
Turnout		2,417	50.8
Registered electors		4,755	

General election 2016: Middle
Party	Candidate	Votes	%
Independent	William Cato Shimmins	1,357	33.5
Independent	Robert Howard Quayle	1,205	29.8
Independent	Paul Herbert Craine	1,090	26.9
Independent	William Edward Bowers	394	9.7
Total votes		4,046	
Total ballots		2,296	
Rejected ballots		11	
Turnout		2,307	51.9
Registered electors		4,445	

== See also ==
- Local government in the Isle of Man
