= Joseph Davidson Qualtrough =

Manx politician (1885–1960)

Sir Joseph Davidson Qualtrough CBE JP SHK (11 June 1885 – 14 January 1960) was Speaker of the House of Keys from 1937 to 1960.

He was born in Castletown, the son of Joseph Qualtrough MLC, Receiver General of the Isle of Man. He was educated at King William's College and then served in the Royal Army Ordnance Corps from 1915 to 1919 as a lieutenant. On his return from the war he was elected MHK for Castletown in 1919 in a by-election. He was returned unopposed in 1919, 1924, 1929 and 1934 and was again returned as MHK for the same constituency at the 1946, 1951 and 1956 General Elections. He was a Methodist local preacher and a Manx speaker. In 1954, he was knighted by Queen Elizabeth II. He was appointed Speaker of the House of Keys on 7 December 1937 and served in that position until his death.

The Second Report of the Tynwald Honours Committee 2004-2005 recommended his inclusion in the Manx Patriots' Roll of Honour, citing his championing of the campaigns for 'constitutional reform and a greater degree of self-government' as well as his role in the establishment of a national housing scheme and a winter works scheme. Tynwald approved of his inclusion, alongside 15 others, at its 13 July 2005 sitting.
