= National Party (Isle of Man) =

Defunct political party in the Isle of Man

The National Party was a party in the Isle of Man that associated itself with the British Conservatives. They were active in the period between World War I and World War II in opposing the activities of the Manx Labour Party. However, unlike the Manx Labour Party, they were unsuccessful in establishing themselves over the longer term and they folded.
