= Michael, Isle of Man =

Sheading of the Isle of Man

Michael Maayl
- Sheading
- Sheading of Michael
- Crown dependency: Isle of Man
- Parishes: Michael, Ballaugh, Jurby

Area
  - Total: 75.20 km^{2} (29.03 sq mi)
  - Rank: 6

Population (2021)
  - Total: 3,343
  - Density: 44.45/km^{2} (115.1/sq mi)

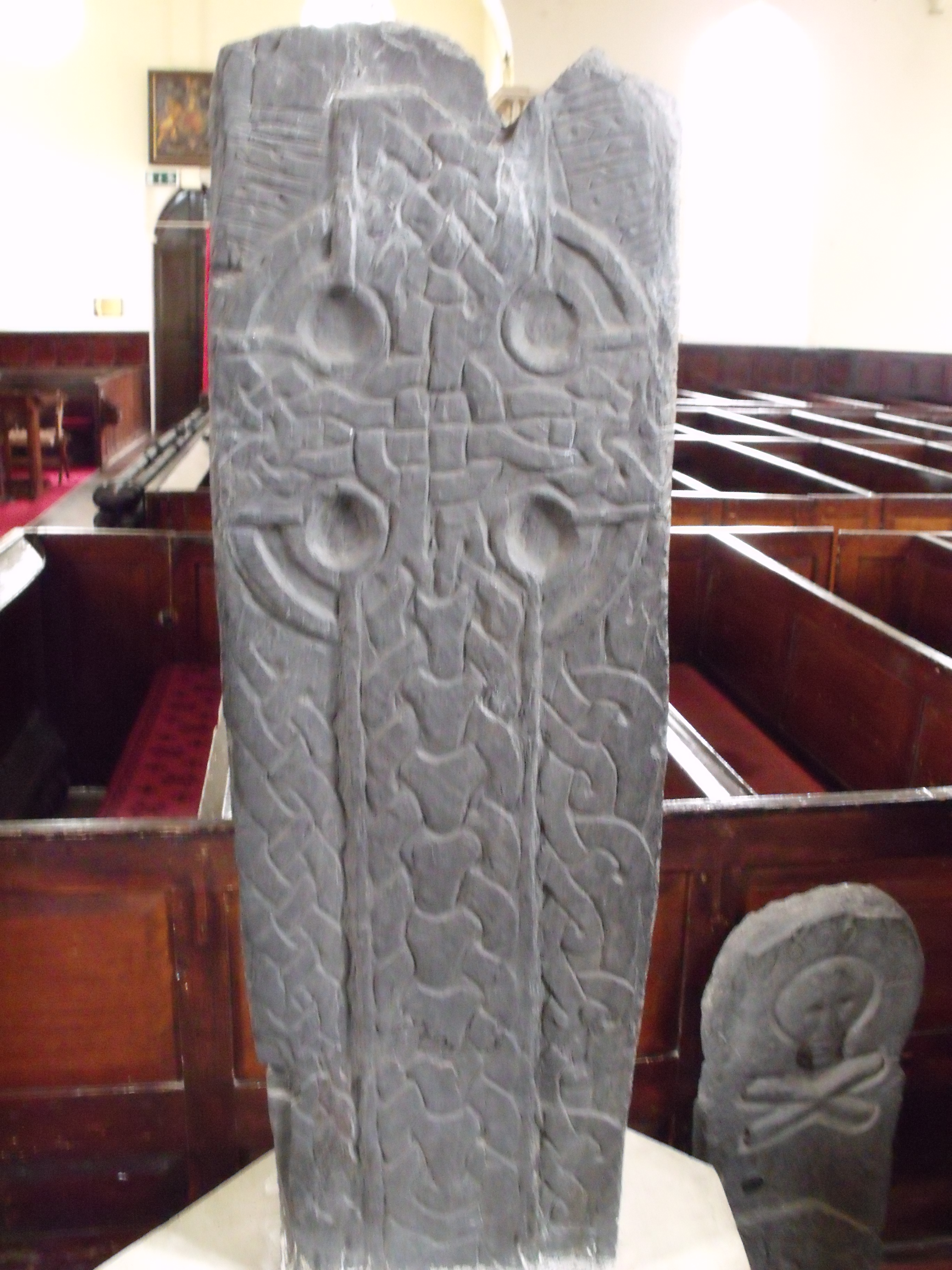
Gaut's Cross

Michael (Manx: Maayl) is one of the six sheadings of the Isle of Man. It is located on the west of the island (part of the traditional North Side division) and consists of the three historic parishes of Ballaugh, Jurby and Michael.

The villages of Kirk Michael and Ballaugh are the two principal settlements in the sheading, with the parish of Jurby being more sparsely populated. Michael sheading is predominantly agricultural.

== Toponymy ==
Michael derives its name from St Michael the Archangel, to whom the parish church in Kirk Michael is dedicated. The ancient treens of the sheading consist of 18 Gaelic place names and 10 Norse place names, indicating a more significant early Celtic presence in the area than Scandinavian. Jurby has a Norse name and is the northernmost and least populated parish in the sheading, with no significant settlements. John Kneen suggested the Norse "used the greater part of the sheading as a hunting-ground rather than a place of residence".

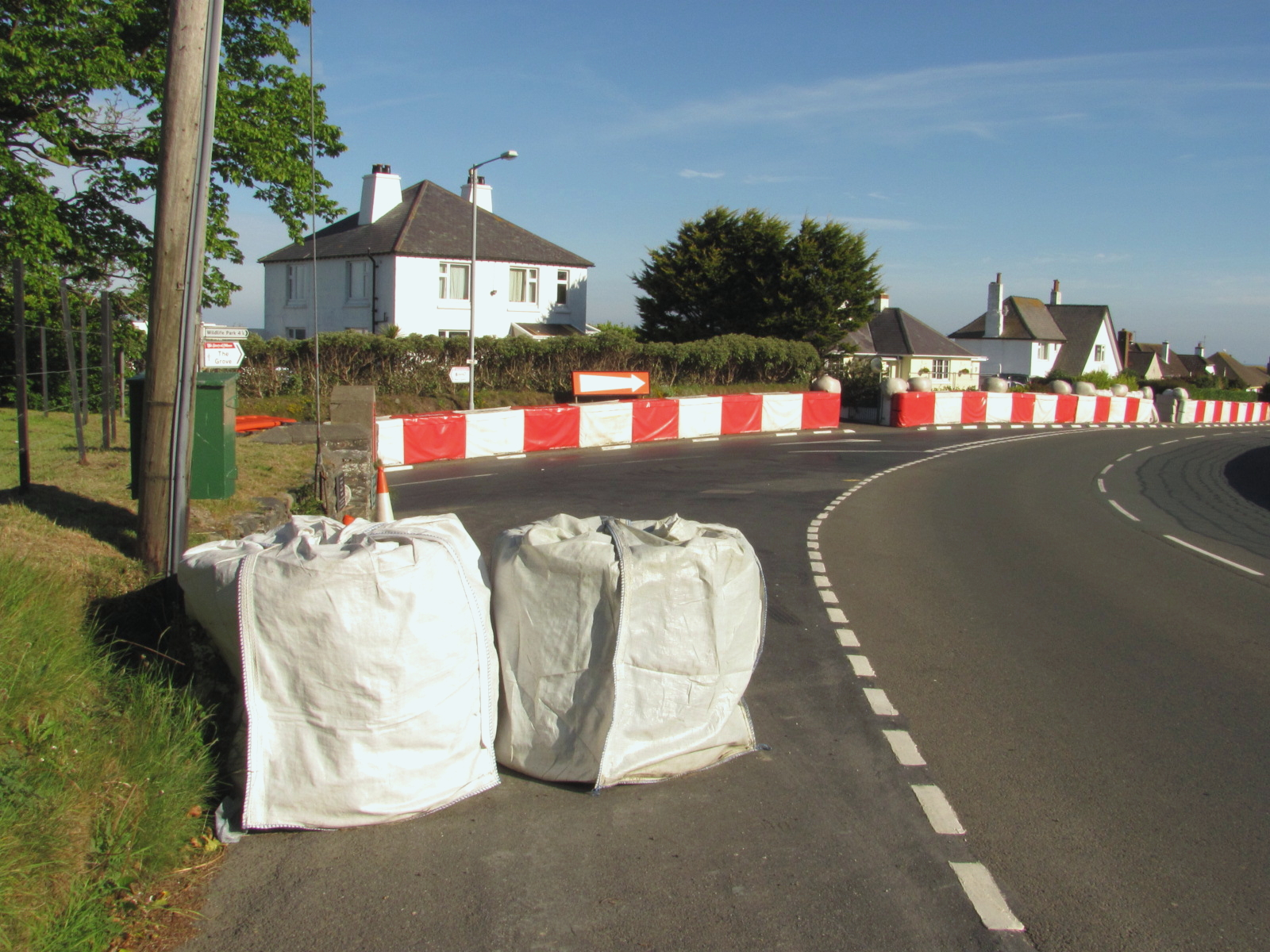
TT course safety devices at Douglas Road Corner, the right-hander entering Kirk Michael village

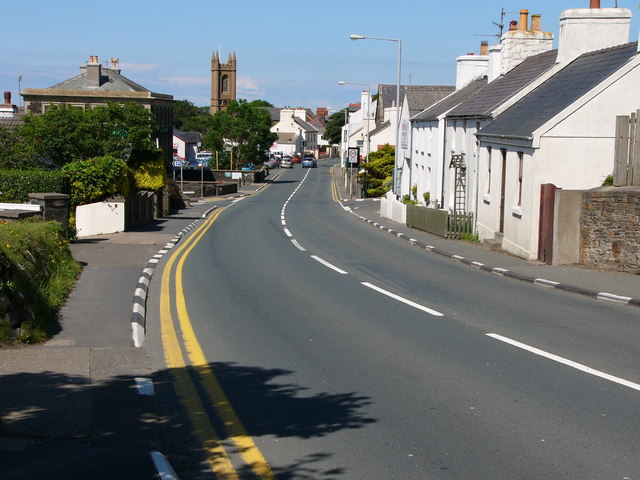
The main A3 road leading through Kirk Michael village after Douglas Road Corner

== MHKs and elections ==
Until 2016, the sheading of Michael formed a single constituency.

=== Members of Parliament ===
Election	Member	Member
1903	John Christian Crellin	William Crennell
1907	Edward Curphey	—N/a
1908	Edward Curphey	John Cannan
1913	Edward Curphey	—N/a
1919	Edward Curphey	—N/a
1924	Edward Curphey	—N/a
1929	John Crellin	Thomas Henry Kneen
1934	John Crellin	Thomas Henry Kneen
1982	David Cannan	—N/a
1986	David Cannan	—N/a
1991	David Cannan	—N/a
1996	David Cannan	—N/a
2001	David Cannan	—N/a
2006	David Cannan	—N/a
2011	Alfred Cannan	—N/a

=== Elections ===
Year	Election	Turnout	Candidates
1903	General Election	Unopposed	John Christian Crellin (elected); William Crennell (elected)
1907	By Election		Edward Curphey
1908	General Election		Edward Curphey, 266 votes, elected; John Cannan, 218 votes, elected
1913	General Election		Edward Curphey, elected; ?
1919	General Election		Edward Curphey, elected; ?
1924	General Election		Edward Curphey, elected; ?
1929	General Election		John Crellin, elected; Thomas Henry Kneen, elected
1934	General Election		John Crellin, elected; Thomas Henry Kneen, elected
1982	By-Election		David Cannan, elected; (in full, John David Qualtrough Cannan)
1986	General Election		David Cannan (946 votes, elected); MH James (156 votes); DF Ellison (149 votes)
1991	General Election	75.3%	David Cannan (1068 votes, elected); TJ Murphy (243 votes); SL Morrey (188 votes)
1996	General Election	72.3%	David Cannan (973 votes, elected); Margaret Kewley-Draskau (495 votes)
2001	General Election	68.3%	David Cannan, 898 votes, elected; Roy Kennaugh, 630 votes
2006	General Election	64.3%	David Cannan, 1062 votes, elected; Ron Berry, 329 votes
2011	General Election	62.6%	Alfred Cannan, 1014 votes, elected; David Talbot, 325 votes; Paul Heavey, 244 votes

The constituency was abolished in 2016.

== In media ==
- Most of the action of The Deemster takes place in Michael Sheading.
- Glen Wyllin (Glen Mooar) beach was used as a location in the 2004 film Five Children and It.

== See also ==
- Local government in the Isle of Man
