= George Frederick Clucas =

Manx politician

Sir George Frederick Clucas, CBE, JP (11 January 1870 – 11 November 1937) was a Manx politician and Speaker of the House of Keys from 1919 to 1937.

He was born in London in 1870, the son of George Pettmann Clucas (born George Pettman Clarke), an assistant master at Repton School. He was educated at Repton School and Christ's College, Cambridge. He was called to the English Bar in 1894, and to the Manx Bar in 1895. From 1915 to 1918, he served as a deputy director at the Ministry of Munitions. He was elected MHK for Middle in 1908 and was Speaker from 1919 until his death in 1937. He was appointed a Commander of the Order of the British Empire (CBE) in the 1927 Birthday Honours, and received a knighthood in the 1937 Coronation Honours.

On 24 January 1911, he married Louisa Elizabeth Wynn Hughes-Games, the widow of Arthur William Moore SHK. Upon hearing of the death of Sir Frederick following an operation for acute appendicitis, in 1937 she also died, of shock.
