= Independent Labour (Isle of Man) =

Isle of Man political party

The Independent Labour was a political party in the Isle of Man.

At the 2001 election for the House of Keys, Independent Labour polled 1.0% and won no seats. It was linked to the UK's Independent Labour Network, founded in 1998 by Ken Coates and Hugh Kerr.

They are no longer active however, having died out in 2002 in the Isle of Man.
