= Tynwald =

Legislature of the Isle of Man

Coordinates: 54.1508°N 4.4814°W

High Court of Tynwald Ard-whaiyl Tinvaal

Type
- Type: Bicameral
- Houses: Legislative Council; House of Keys
- Established: Traditional: 979; Historical: 13th century

Leadership
- President of Tynwald and of the Legislative Council: Hon. Juan Watterson MLC since 2026
- Speaker of the House of Keys: Hon. David Ashford SHK

Structure
- Seats: 35: 11 MLCs; 24 MHKs
- Legislative Council political groups: Independent (8); Ex officio (3)
- House of Keys political groups: Independent (21); Manx Labour (2); Liberal Vannin Party (1)

Elections
- Legislative Council voting system: Indirect election
- House of Keys voting system: Multiple non-transferable vote
- Last House of Keys election: 24 September 2026
- Next House of Keys election: 25 September 2031

Meeting place
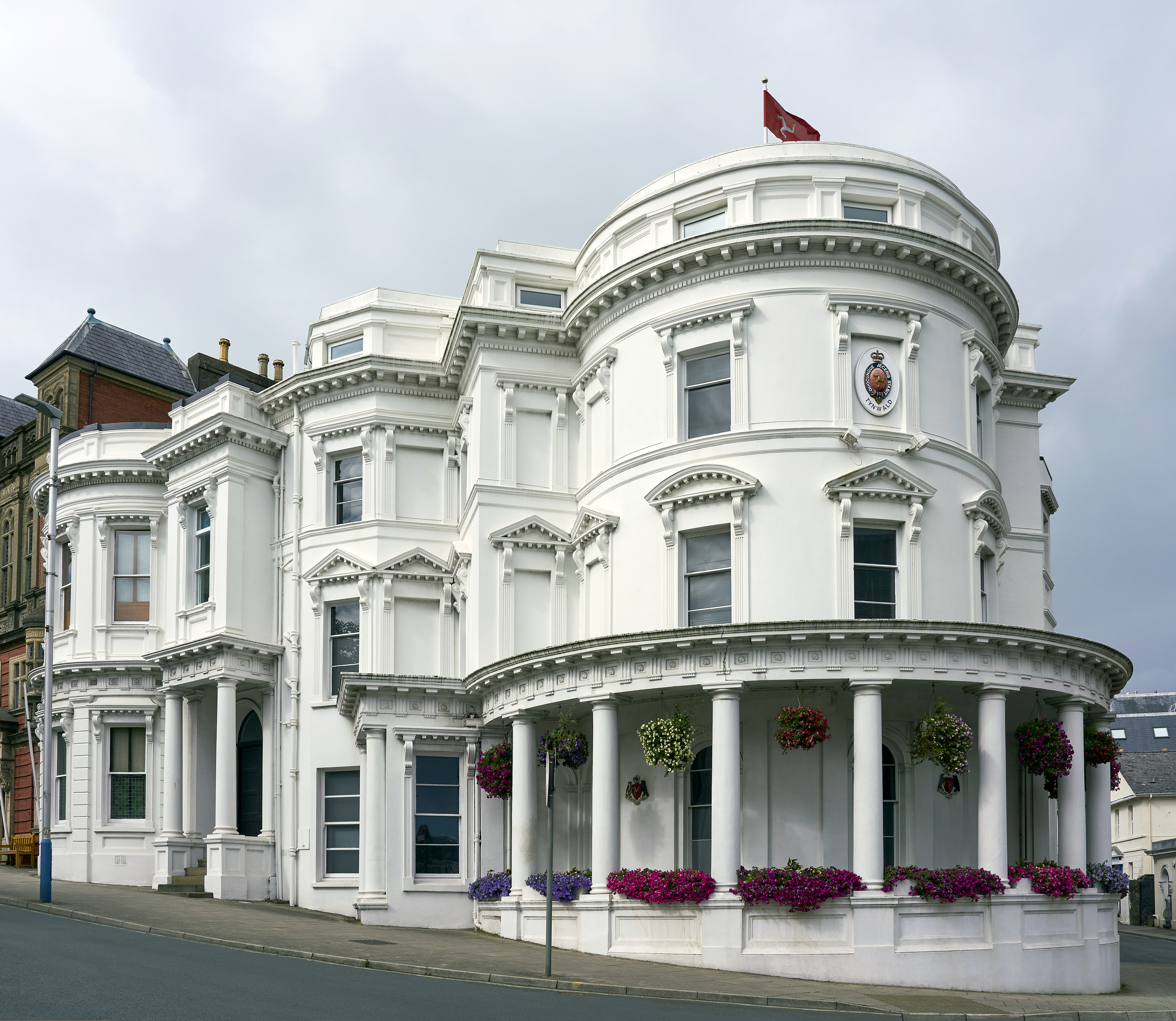
- Legislative Buildings, Douglas, Isle of Man

Website
- www.tynwald.org.im

Tynwald (Manx: Tinvaal), or more formally, the High Court of Tynwald (Ard-whaiyl Tinvaal) or Tynwald Court, is the legislature of the Isle of Man. Established in 979 according to tradition or in the 13th century according to available historical evidence, it is the oldest continuous legislature in the world, and the second oldest legislature in the world, after the Althing, which was established in 930, disbanded in 1800, and restored in 1845.

The Tynwald consists of two chambers, known as the branches of Tynwald: the directly elected House of Keys and the indirectly chosen Legislative Council. When the two chambers sit together, they become "Tynwald Court". The chambers sit jointly, on Tynwald Day at St John's for largely ceremonial purposes, and usually once a month in the Legislative Buildings in Douglas. Otherwise, the two chambers sit separately, with the House of Keys originating most legislation, and the Legislative Council acting as a revising chamber.

== Etymology ==
The name Tynwald, like the Icelandish Þingvellir and Norwegian Tingvoll, is derived from the Old Norse compoundword Þingvǫllr, which meant "meeting place of the thing (assembly)", literally the "Thingfield" (Old Norse vǫllr, "field", became wald; compare the (now archaic) Danish reflex vold, "field", "meadow", and the Old English cognate weald, "forest").

== Tynwald Day ==
Tynwald meets annually on Tynwald Day (usually on 5 July) at an open-air ceremony at Tynwald Hill at St John's. The Lieutenant Governor of the Isle of Man presides, unless the monarch as Lord of Mann, or a member of the Royal Family representing them, is present. Here, all laws are promulgated in both Manx and English and petitions are received.

=== Promulgation ===
If an Act of Tynwald is not promulgated at St John's within 18 months of passage, it becomes null and void.

== Joint sittings ==
When Tynwald Court sits in Douglas (historically once a month from October to July), the President of Tynwald, who is elected by the other members, presides. In the joint session:

- Members of each house formally sign bills
- Notices of royal assent from the Lord of Mann are received
- Questions may be put to ministers
- Special resolutions authorising taxes are made
- Delegated legislation made by government departments may be approved or annulled
- Petitions may be presented
- Other important public business is conducted

=== Voting ===
When Tynwald votes at a joint sitting, each branch normally votes separately. If a majority of each branch approves, the motion is carried. If the Council vote ties, then the President of Tynwald casts the deciding vote in line with the majority vote of the Keys. However, if the Keys approves a motion but the Council disapproves, then the question can be put again at a different sitting. In this case, the vote is determined by a majority of all the members of Tynwald. If this occurs, the Keys, with its larger size, is likely to prevail.

However, in some cases Tynwald votes as one body even when there is no disagreement between the branches: e.g. when electing the Chief Minister or on a vote of no confidence in the Council of Ministers.

== Passage of legislation ==
Normally, both branches of Tynwald must pass a bill before it goes to the sovereign or his representative the Lieutenant Governor, representing the King-in-Council, for royal assent. If the Council rejects a bill or amends it against the Keys' wishes, however, the Keys has the power to repass the same bill; in this case the Council's approval is not required, and the bill is presented to the Lieutenant Governor for royal assent.

On some matters, the Royal Assent to Legislation and Sodor and Man Diocesan Synod Measures (Isle of Man) Order 2022 requires the Lieutenant Governor to consult with and follow the advice of the Secretary of State for Justice of the United Kingdom.

== History ==
Tynwald claims to be over 1,000 years old, and thus the "oldest continuous parliament" in the world (Iceland's Althing claims world’s oldest parliament, though with noncontinuous operation). In 1979, the Manx people celebrated the millennium of their parliament. The year was picked arbitrarily by officials; there is no evidence indicating that such an assembly was held in 979, or that any such event resembled the modern-day court. The first record of the place-name occurs in the 13th–14th century Chronicles of Mann, and the first description of the role and composition of an assembly held on site occurs in the early 15th century.

=== Medieval period ===
Tynwald originally comprised only the 24 Members of the House of Keys, commonly referred to as "the Keys". There were four members for each of the six sheadings of the island. The earliest surviving record of the Keys dates from 1417. The Keys were not originally an elected body, and membership was for life. When a vacancy arose the remaining members selected the replacement member. In general, membership of the Keys passed down through the leading families on the island.

In the 16th century the Keys met irregularly. They were akin to a jury which was summoned from time to time by the Lord of Mann or by the deemsters when they required advice as to the law. In 1600 the Keys became a permanent body.

Until 1577, the Keys merely declared and interpreted the ancient common law when queries arose. This developed into the power to create new laws, a function that Tynwald adopted around 1610.

=== 17th and 18th centuries ===
In October 1651, during the English Civil War, the island fell to the Parliamentary forces, who took over the administration of the government. During this period, Tynwald met only sporadically.

Following the restoration of the monarchy, control of the island was returned to the Lords of Mann. The Keys saw a reduction in their power at this point, as Tynwald was reconstituted as "the Lord [of Mann], the Governor, the principal officers and the deemsters (who constitute the Lord's Council), and the Commons represented by their Keys."

Administration of the government was vested in a Governor, and the Lords of Mann became absentee landlords. The Keys were unhappy with the changes, and agreed to very few new laws.

In 1737, Tynwald obtained further powers in addition to its monopoly on law-making: the agreement of Tynwald would be required for all taxation, in imitation of the constitutional practice of Great Britain. This was a short-lived arrangement, as in 1765 the Lord of Mann sold his rights over the island to the British Crown.

=== Post-revestment ===
Following the revestment of the Lordship of Mann into the British Crown in 1765, the British government assumed all powers to impose and collect taxes. Tynwald was left with no money to spend, and little power, although it was still able to bring about social change by the repeal in 1771 of restrictive labour legislation.

As a result, the Keys asked the British government to dissolve Tynwald and to assent to legislation for a new elected parliament, which they hoped would have a stronger voice to challenge the new government of the island, based in distant Whitehall. To this end, the Keys organised a petition of 800 signatures, which was presented to the British government.

A Royal Commission was appointed in 1791, but it was not until 1866 that Tynwald finally passed legislation that would see some of its members elected for the first time. However, before 1866 Tynwald's primary function had been that of the island's court of appeal. The House of Keys Election Act 1866 transferred this judicial power to a separate court.

=== Women in Tynwald ===
Women have been able to stand for election to the House of Keys since the 1919 introduction of universal adult suffrage based on residency. The first woman elected was Marion Shimmin of the Manx Labour Party at a by-election in 1933.

== Royal Commission on the Isle of Man ==
In 1791 a Royal Commission on the Isle of Man was formed to examine the governance and finances of the island.

The Commissioners reported back to Whitehall in 1792, stating that "The laws and ordinances that were enacted during the fifteenth and sixteenth centuries appear by the Manks Statute Book to have been prescribed by such different powers, or combination of powers, that as precedents of the exercise of legislative authority they can have but little weight." The Commission noted that only subsequent to this period was the practice of the Council and 24 Keys meeting together to enact legislation established as "the more regular mode of legislating".

The Royal Commission also noted that the earliest insular Manx laws on record dated from 1417 (the first Act on record being a restriction of the powers of the church to offer sanctuary). This was after the arrival of the Stanley family as Lords of Mann. It also noted that the comprehensive Manx Statute Book dated from the year 1422 onwards. These were not necessarily the earliest laws passed, but any prior to this date were not recorded as Acts of Tynwald. Comparison can be made with other parliaments in the British Isles of a similar period: the oldest recorded in England was from 1229, in Scotland 1424, and in Ireland 1216 – although again there were prior laws that are now merely part of the unwritten common law of each country.

The opening statement of the Statute Book was "Divers Ordinances, Statutes, and Customs, presented, reputed, and used for Laws in the Land of Mann, that were ratified, approved, and confirmed, as well by the Honourable Sir John Stanley, Knight, King and Lord of the same Land, and divers others his Predecessors, as by all Barons, Deemsters, Officers, Tenants, Inhabitants, and Commons of the same Land where the Lord's Right is declared in the following Words". Furthermore, the Commissioners' report noted that prior to the revestment, no "minutes or journals" of the proceedings of the Council or the House of Keys had been kept.

... in respect to government and laws, the Manks appear, in all ages to have been a distinct people, and in some degree an independent, or not annexed to any other kingdom ... The people, however, beyond all written record, have clearly within claimed and enjoyed the right and privilege of being governed and regulated by laws of their own making, or consented to by themselves, or by their constitutional representative ...

To maintain this independence of the Legislature, is held to be the first duty of every Manxman ... they dread therefore and must ever dread, the interference in their internal concerns, or even a precedent being made for such interference from any other legislature on earth; even the British ...

— Report of the Commissioners of Inquiry for the Isle of Man, 1792

== Proposed changes ==
In 2007, the island's system of government was reviewed with plans to transform the Legislative Council into a directly elected chamber, likely stemming from debate around the reform of the House of Lords, which was a promise of the Blair Government, and resulted in the passage of the House of Lords Act 1999 and the Constitutional Reform Act 2005. As of September 2023, no such legislation has passed through Tynwald or Parliament of the United Kingdom, however between 2017 and 2018 Tynwald considered a series of recommendations from Lord Lisvane regarding legislative reform, most of which were rejected.

According to the House of Keys Hansard for 6 December 2023, it was stated that the question of removing the Bishop's vote, and possibly seat, in LegCo and Tynwald has been debated ten times in the recent past. This proposal for change was defeated in the Keys on 6 December 2023. Ultimately, the Bishop's seat was retained, but the vote removed, by the passage of the Isle of Man (Constitution Bill) 2023 (Private Members Bill) in 2026.

== Millennium Way ==
The Millennium Way long distance footpath was opened in 1979 to commemorate the millennium year of Tynwald.

== See also ==
- Act of Tynwald
- List of acts of Tynwald

== Sources ==
- Broderick, George (2003): "Tynwald - a Manx cult-site and institution of pre-Scandinavian origin?" Cambrian Medieval Celtic Studies, no. 46 (Winter 2003): pp. 55–94.
