= Walter Gilbey (disambiguation) =

Sir Walter Gilbey, 1st Baronet (1831–1914) was an English wine merchant.

Walter Gilbey may also refer to:

- Sir Walter Gilbey, 2nd Baronet (1859–1945), English wine merchant, son of the above, of the Gilbey baronets
- Walter Gilbey (politician) (1935–2023), British politician and businessman, son of the above
- Sir Derek Gilbey, 3rd Baronet (Walter Derek Gilbey, 1913–1991), grandson of the 2nd Baronet, of the Gilbey baronets
- Sir Gavin Gilbey, 4th Baronet (Walter Gavin Gilbey, born 1949), English archaeologist and anthropologist, son of the above, of the Gilbey baronets

== See also ==
- Gilbey (surname)
