= Gilbey =

Gilbey is a surname. Notable people with the surname include:

- Alex Gilbey (born 1994), English footballer
- Alfred Newman Gilbey (1901–1998), British Roman Catholic priest and monsignor
- Chris Gilbey (born 1946), Australian entrepreneur and music industry figure
- George Gilbey (1984–2024), British television personality
- Harry Gilbey, British early film actor
- Julian Gilbey (born 1978), British film director
- Richard Gilbey, 12th Baron Vaux of Harrowden (born 1965), British hereditary peer
- Ronald Gilbey (1911–1977), British figure skater, businessman and politician
- Sheelagh Gilbey (born 1953), British television presenter and actress
- Tom Gilbey (footballer) (1898–1962), English footballer
- Tom Gilbey (designer) (1938–2017), British fashion designer
- Walter Gilbey (1831–1914), British wine-merchant and philanthropist
- Walter Gilbey (politician) (1935–2023), British politician and businessman
- Will Gilbey (born 1979), British screenwriter, brother of Julian Gilbey

== See also ==
- Gilbey baronets
- Gilby (surname)
