= Talal Alkernawi =

Arab-Muslim Israeli politician

- طلال القريناوي
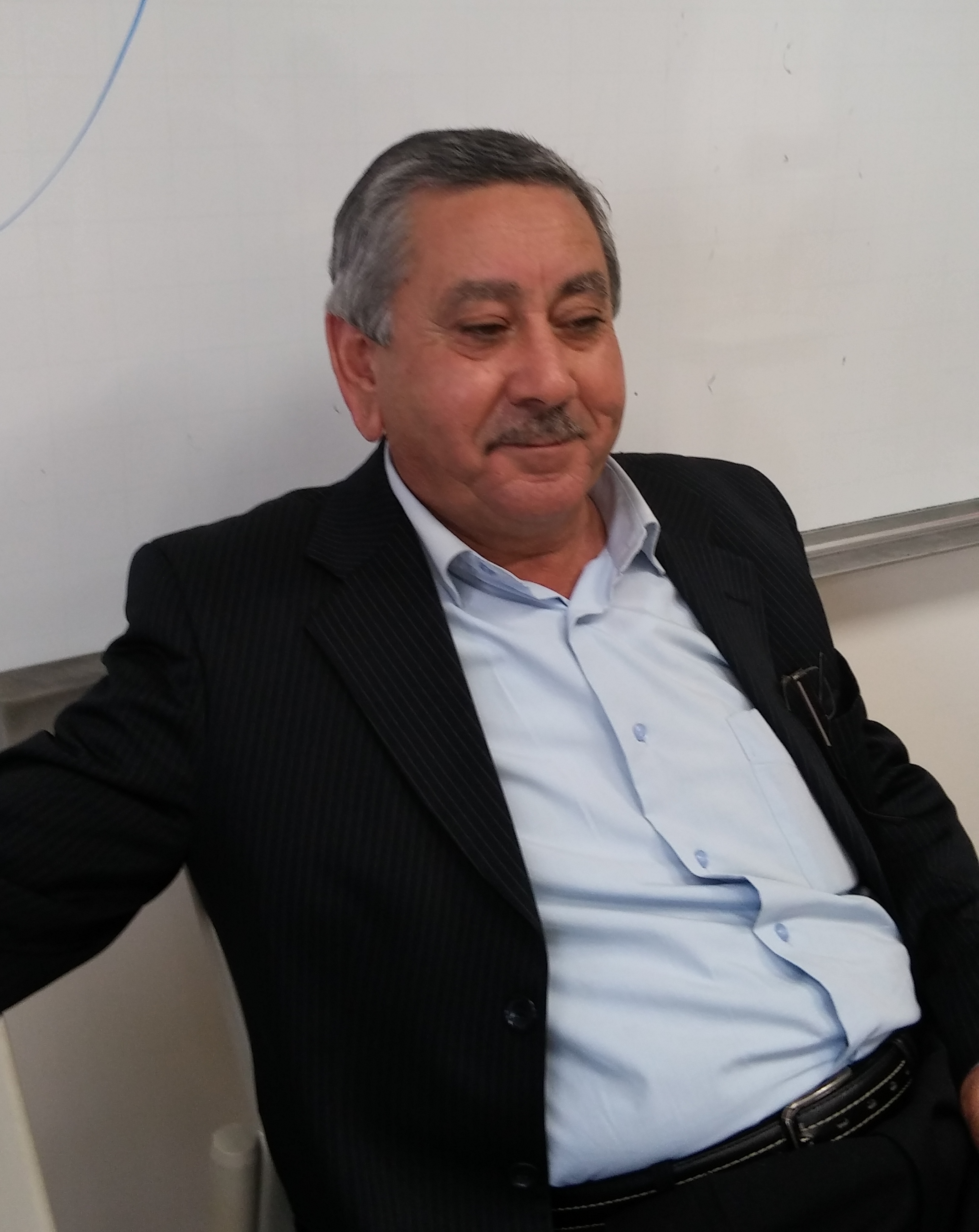
- Talal Alkernawi

Mayor of Rahat
- Incumbent
- Assumed office 18 March 2024
- In office 2013–2018
- In office 2001; 1993 – 2001; 1998

Personal details
- Born: Talal Alkernawi; 1954 (age 71–72) Israel
- Party: Labor (1977–present)
- Other political affiliations: Kadima (formerly)
- Children: 6
- Education: Bachelor of Laws, Ono Academic College (BA)

Talal Alkernawi (Arabic: طلال القريناوي, Hebrew: טלאל קרינאוי, other spellings: Talal Alkrinawi or Talal Al karnawi; born 1954) is an Arab-Muslim Israeli politician. He has served as the mayor of Rahat various times since 1993.

== Early life ==
He was born (1954) and raised in Rahat. He holds a law degree from Ono Academic College.

== Career ==
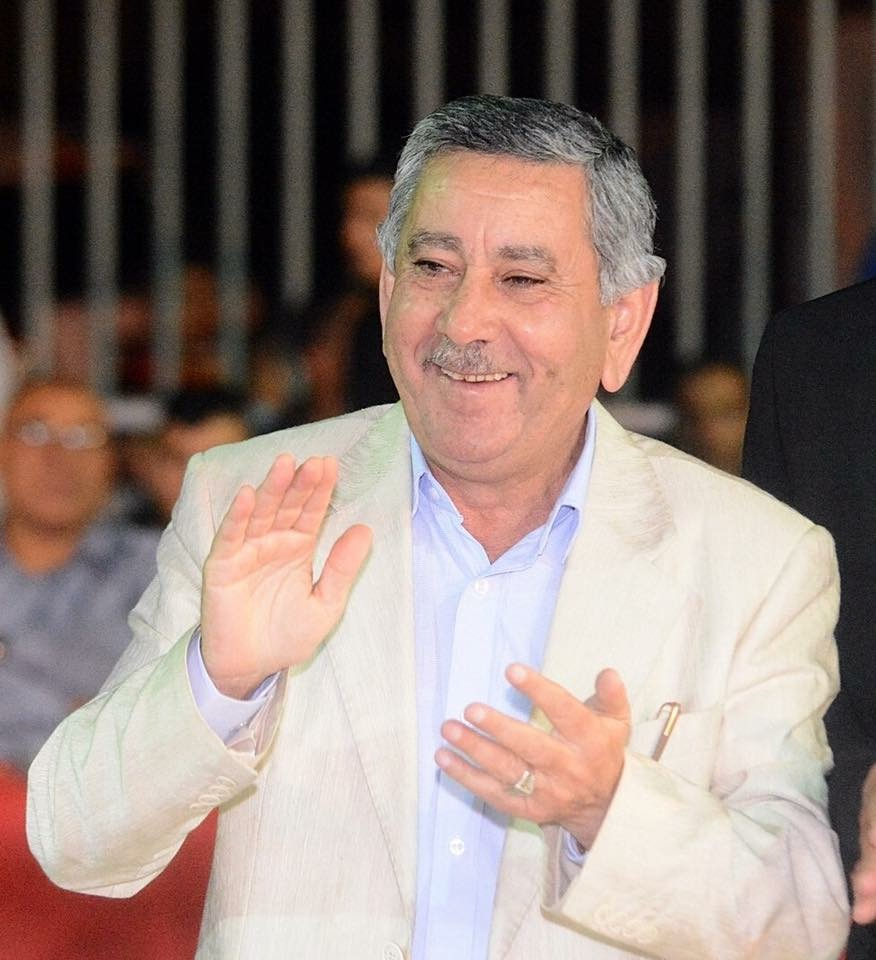
Talal Alkernawi mayor of Rahat

Alkernawi started his career in a local bank. He was quickly promoted and became a bank manager at the age of 25. He served as a bank manager for a few years and then went on to politics.

In 1977, he joined the Israeli Labor Party.

In 1989, he ran for office in the city of Rahat. He was not elected, although he became the deputy mayor. In 1993, he was elected for the first time as the Mayor of Rahat. In his first period of office, Rahat's status was changed from a local council to a city.

In 1994, he participated in the Oslo accords, and was Yitzhak Rabin's advisor as an Arabic-speaking politician.

== Mayoralty ==
=== City size & land ===
During his tenure in Office for the years of 2013-2018, the city grew by 21,000 dunam which meant it doubled its size. This was done by an agreement with a municipality near by to pass land in order for Rahat to grow.

=== Economy ===
The unemployment rate went down from 34% in 2013 to 11% in 2018. Thanks to founding Idan HaNegev and recruiting SodaStream to bring their factory to Rahat and employ over 2,500 employees.

=== Tax collection ===
In 2006, Rahat was able to collect municipality taxes from only 59% of its residents. In 2018, the local municipality collected local tax from 90% of its residents which helped grow its income and budget.

=== Culture ===
Built the first country club (swimming pool and recreational center) in Rahat.

=== Education ===
In terms of education, when he took office in 2013 only 40% of Rahats students finished school with matriculation examination certificate. In 2018, 56% finished with a matriculation examination certificate. In addition, in 2013, only 0.7% of the school students finished with the highest level of English certificate. In 2018, the percentage grew to 8.4%.

=== Tourism ===
In 2015, the municipality cooperating with government ministries started to develop tourists trips in Rahat.

== Personal life ==
Alkernawi lives in Rahat, is married and has six children. He is the brother of Prof. Alean Al Krenawi.

== Political views ==
Alkernawi is known to express his views supporting coexistence living between Arabs and Jews in Israel. He was a member of two different center-left wing parties (Kadima and Labor party).

In 2017, he publicly offered to absorb Syrian refugees to Rahat, and offered them work in the city.
