= Cadets for Municipal Service in Israel =

The Cadets for Municipal Service program in Israel is a joined initiative in Israel between the Israeli government and few NGOs, that was created with the goal to train a cadre of dynamic new municipal leaders for Israel's periphery. The goal of the program is to give excellence students not only academic training, but the tools, understanding, sensitivity and leadership qualities to deal with the complex municipal environment in under-served communities in Israel. The program was conducted in order to improve the quality of the human power in the weak municipalities of Israel.

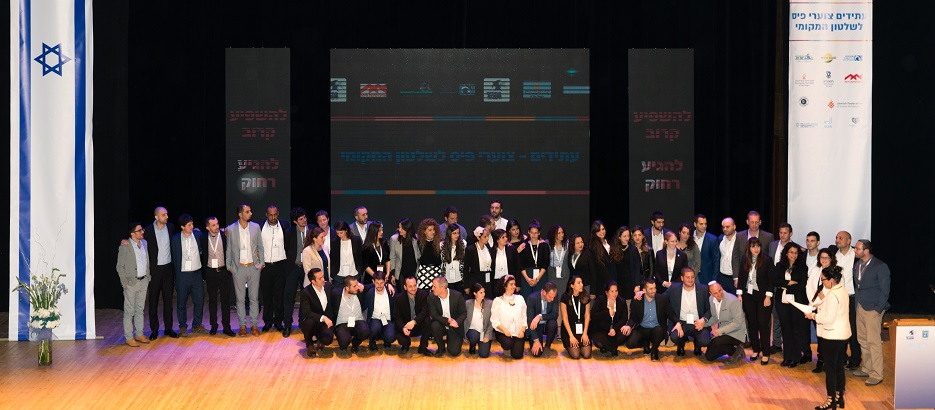

Currently there are few branches of the program. There is a program at Ben-Gurion University of the Negev for BA students, a program at Haifa University for MA students, a program in Tel-Hai college for BA students, a program in the Technion for Urban Development MA students and a program in the Oranim College for education BA students. Different programs were initiated to gain alumnies with different professions who can deal with different challenges inside the municipalities they will be working in.

== History ==
The first program was started in the beginning of the century with the goal to train young excellence students to work for the governments in various ministries. The program took place in the Hebrew university and was arranged and funded by Atidim NGO. The program ran for a few years and as they saw it worked well and produced highly talented civil servants, they decided to start a new program aimed for the local governments of Israel. Atidim NGO joined forces with the Israeli Ministry of Interior and started the first program in 2011 in Ben Gurion University for BA students. The first Alumni class finished their training in 2014 and went on to work for different cities all around Israel.

== The Program ==
There are few different programs as listed above but they all have few different aspects. The participants study for their academic degree while in parallel they get specific local government training which includes lectures from civil servants, round tables, few days seminars in cities and communities in Israel, taskforces, analysis tasks and more. Each student has to an internship in a national government ministry office, and later on an internship in local government.

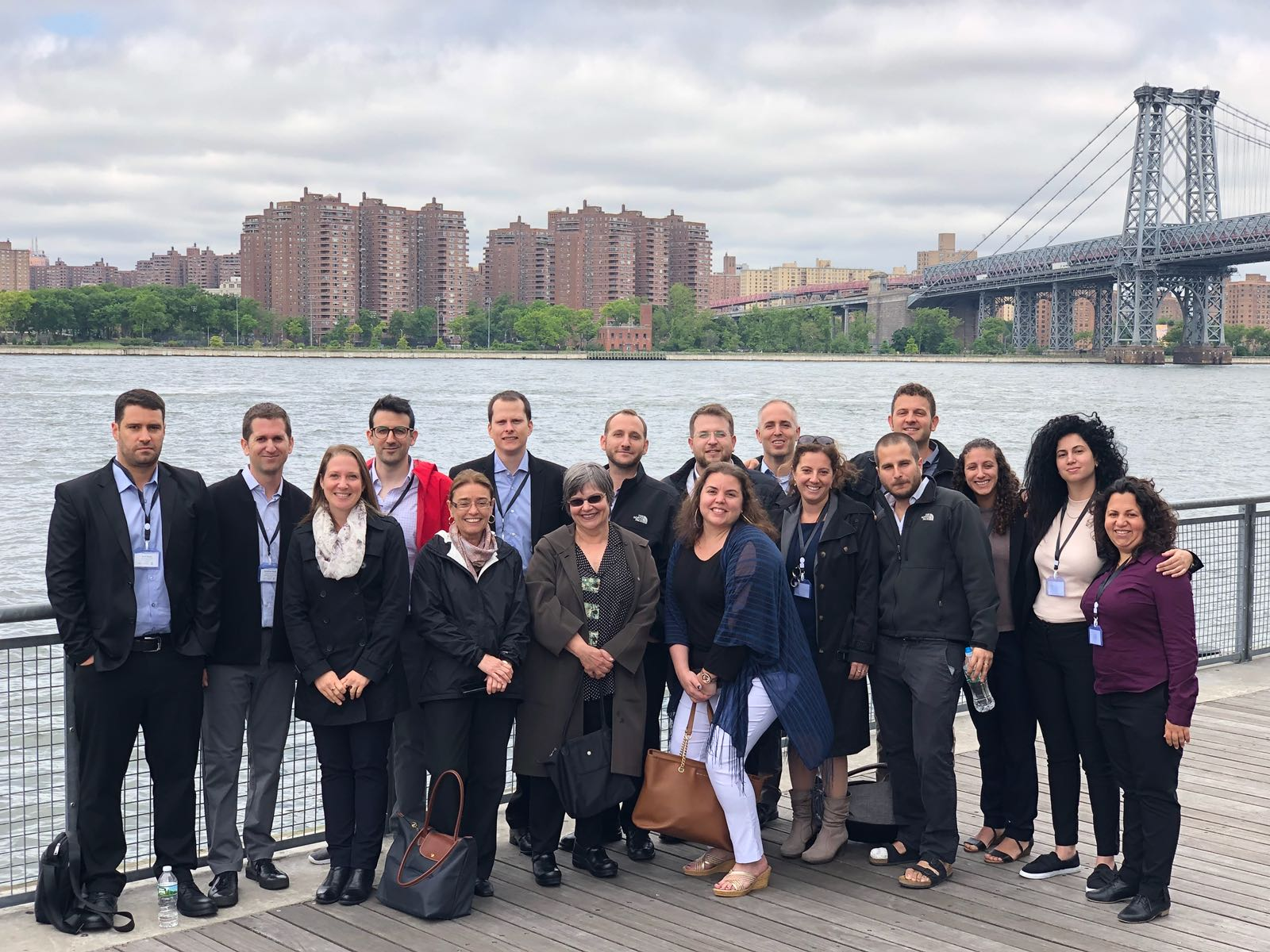

At the end of the program the students go on a ten days learning trip to local governments abroad (like Berlin, Frankfurt, London, Vienna, Amsterdam and more) to learn how these cities deal with their challenges. The goal is that at the end of the program the participant will become a local government expert.

All five branches of the programs are a bit different from each other: BA in Ben-Gurion University of the Negev - A three years program where participants can study a range of different subject and in addition to studying public administration. MA in Haifa University - A two years Masters in Public Administration. BA in Tel-Hai College - A three years program focused mostly on business and economy studies and aimed at placing alumni in the local governments of the northern area of Israel. MSA in the Technion - A two years program in Urban Development aimed at placing alumni in local governments planning departments. BA in Oranim College - three years program in education aimed at placing alumni in local governments education departments.

After finishing the program, participants receive a 4 years contract to work in a local government that is considered poor and underserved. The participants are not allowed go on to work for the richest and strongest cities of Israel like Tel Aviv and Haifa. Some of the participants get a new contract while in their 4 years obligation and stay further in the municipality.

== Cities That Have Recruited Cadets ==
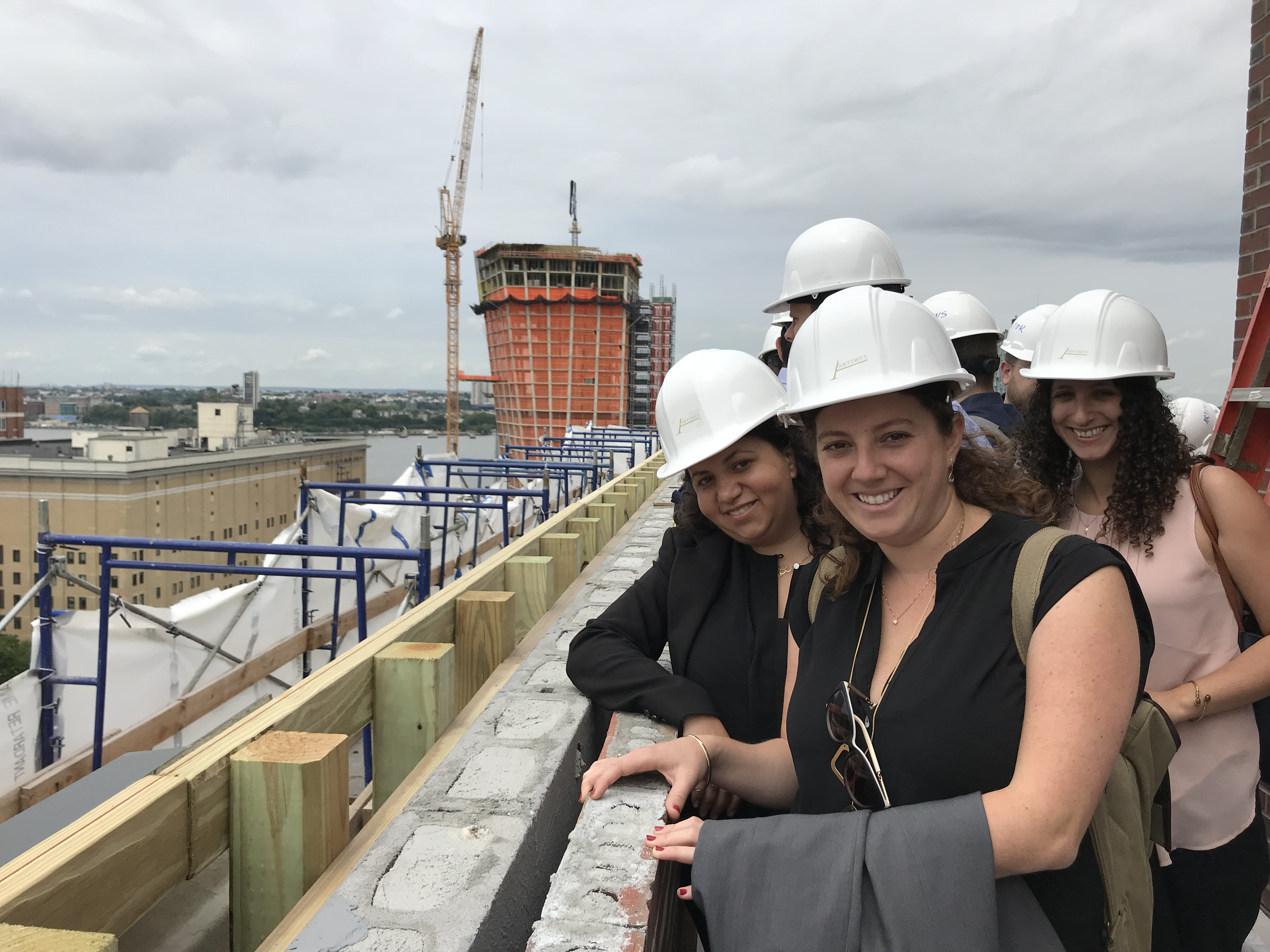

These are some major cities that program alumni are working in today: Jerusalem, Acre, Afula, Arad, Beersheba, Rahat, Beit She'an, Bnei Brak and much more. Overall there are program alumni in more than 100 cities in Israel.

== See also ==
- Israel
- Ben-Gurion University of the Negev
- University of Haifa
