= Gilby =

Gilby may refer to:

- Gilby (surname)
- Gilby, North Dakota, a city in North Dakota in the United States
- Gilby Engineering, motor racing team and racing car constructor
