= Cameron baronets of Balclutha (1893) =

Escutcheon of the Cameron baronets of Balclutha

The Cameron baronetcy, of Balclutha in the parish of Greenock in the County of Renfrew, was created on 27 August 1893. for the Liberal Party politician Charles Cameron, a former editor of the North British Daily Mail who was at that time the member of parliament (MP) for Glasgow College. Upon the death in 1924 of Sir Charles, his son John succeeded to the baronetcy – which became extinct on his death.

== Cameron baronets, of Balclutha (1893) ==
- Sir Charles Cameron, 1st Baronet (1841–1924).MP for Glasgow 1874–1885, for Glasgow College 1885–1895, Glasgow Bridgeton 1897–1900.
- Sir John Cameron, 2nd Baronet (1903–1968).

== Notes ==
Baronetage of the United Kingdom
| New creation | Baronet (of Blagdon); 1893–1911 | Extinct |
| Preceded by Wills baronets | Cameron baronets of Balclutha; 27 August 1893 | Succeeded by Gilbey baronets |
