= Walter Gilbey (politician) =

British politician and businessman (1935–2023)

- Born: Walter Anthony Gilbey; 26 February 1935; United Kingdom
- Died: 13 July 2023 (aged 88)
- Occupations: Merchant banker; finance director; entrepreneur; politician
- Years active: 1954–? (business career); 1974–2001 (political career)
- Employers: Berkshire County Council; Isle of Man Government; Isle of Man Steam Packet Company; Manx Telecom
- Spouse: Jenifer Price (m. 1964)
- Children: 3

Walter Anthony Gilbey (26 February 1935 – 13 July 2023) was a British politician and businessman, who was a member of the House of Keys on the Isle of Man.

== Early life and career ==
Gilbey was born on 26 February 1935, his father was Sir Walter Gilbey, 2nd Baronet. He was educated at Eton College and became a merchant banker in London. He later became finance director of Distillers and Vintners Ltd. He was until 2008 a director of the Isle of Man Steam Packet, but remained director of Vannin International Securities. Walter was also interested in hunting and was the master of the Isle of Man Hunt and secretary of the Isle of Man Horse Council.

In his 30s, he was elected to the Berkshire County Council and stood as the Conservative Party candidate for the House of Commons in Southall in February 1974. Upon moving to the Isle of Man he unsuccessfully contested Glenfaba in 1976 and 1981 before being elected at the 1982 by election. He lost his seat in 2001 to David Anderson. During his time in government he was the minister for Local Government and the Environment.

== Personal life and death ==
Gilbey married Jenifer (née Price) in 1964, with whom he had three children. He died on 13 July 2023, at the age of 88.

== Business positions ==
- Chairman of Mannin Trust, 1972–82
- Chairman of Mannin International, 1982–88
- Director & chairman of Vannin International Securities, 1972–?
- Chairman of Mannin Industries, 1972–?
- Director of Gilbey Farms Ltd., 1974–?
- Director of Isle of Man Steam Packet Company, 1976–2008
- Chairman of Manx Telecom, 1986–2010

== Governmental positions ==
- Chairman of the Financial Supervision Commission, 1991–99
- Minister of Local Government and the Environment, 1999–2001
