= Edgar Quine =

Manx politician (born 1934)

Richard Edgar Quine (born 16 August 1934) is a Manx politician. After serving in the Hong Kong Police Force, he was elected to the House of Keys in 1986, where he represented Ayre until 2004.

Edgar Quine was the leader of the Manx political party, the Alliance for Progressive Government and served as deputy Speaker of the House of Keys between 2002 and 2004.

He also serves as President of Ayre United F.C.

== Early life ==
Quine was born at Ballacrebbin in the parish of Andreas near St Jude's. His father worked as a farmer, and until age 11, Quine frequently moved between different farms.

== Personal life ==
He married his wife Ann in Hong Kong on 15 July 1959. The couple celebrated their 50th wedding anniversary in 2009.

== Ministerial positions ==
- Minister of Local Government and the Environment, 1996-1999

== Speeches ==
On democracy in relation to the Isle of Man (October 2005): http://www.positiveactiongroup.org/Edgar_Quine_Peel_Cathedral_lecture.pdf
