= John Rimington (politician) =

Manx politician

John Rimington (born 1952) is a political figure who served as a minister and member of parliament on the Isle of Man.

== Biography ==
Born in Stockport in 1952, Rimington attended Chinley Primary School and then King William's College on the Isle of Man, before graduating from the University of Reading with a degree in politics. He then completed a PGCE in maths. He subsequently taught at a school in Marple from 1975 to 1980 and then worked as a computer programmer for NatWest from 1980 to 1983 before returning to teaching at Hazel Grove in 1983.

In 1984 he opened a landscaping company. He married in 1986 and had two sons. In 1988 he moved to the Isle of Man and continued the landscaping business, while also occasionally working as a supply teacher.

Rimington contested the 1991 general elections as a Green Party candidate in Douglas North, but lost his deposit. In 1992 he became a parish councillor for Rushen parish. He ran as an independent in Rushen in 1996. Although he was unsuccessful again, he won a by-election in 2000. In the general elections the following year he topped the polls and was re-elected. He subsequently joined the cabinet as Minister of Local Government and the Environment in 2004. However, he was comprehensively defeated in the 2006 general elections, when he came fifth out of seven candidates in a three-seat constituency.

After losing his seat he became a mathematics teacher at Castle Rushen High School in Castletown. He later left the Isle of Man and worked for the Green Party in New Zealand then the Welsh Green Party in Cardiff.

== Governmental positions ==
- Minister of Local Government and the Environment, 2004-2006
- Minister of Agriculture, Fisheries and Forestry, 2002-2004
