= Idan HaNegev =

Coordinates: 31.3764°N 34.7872°E

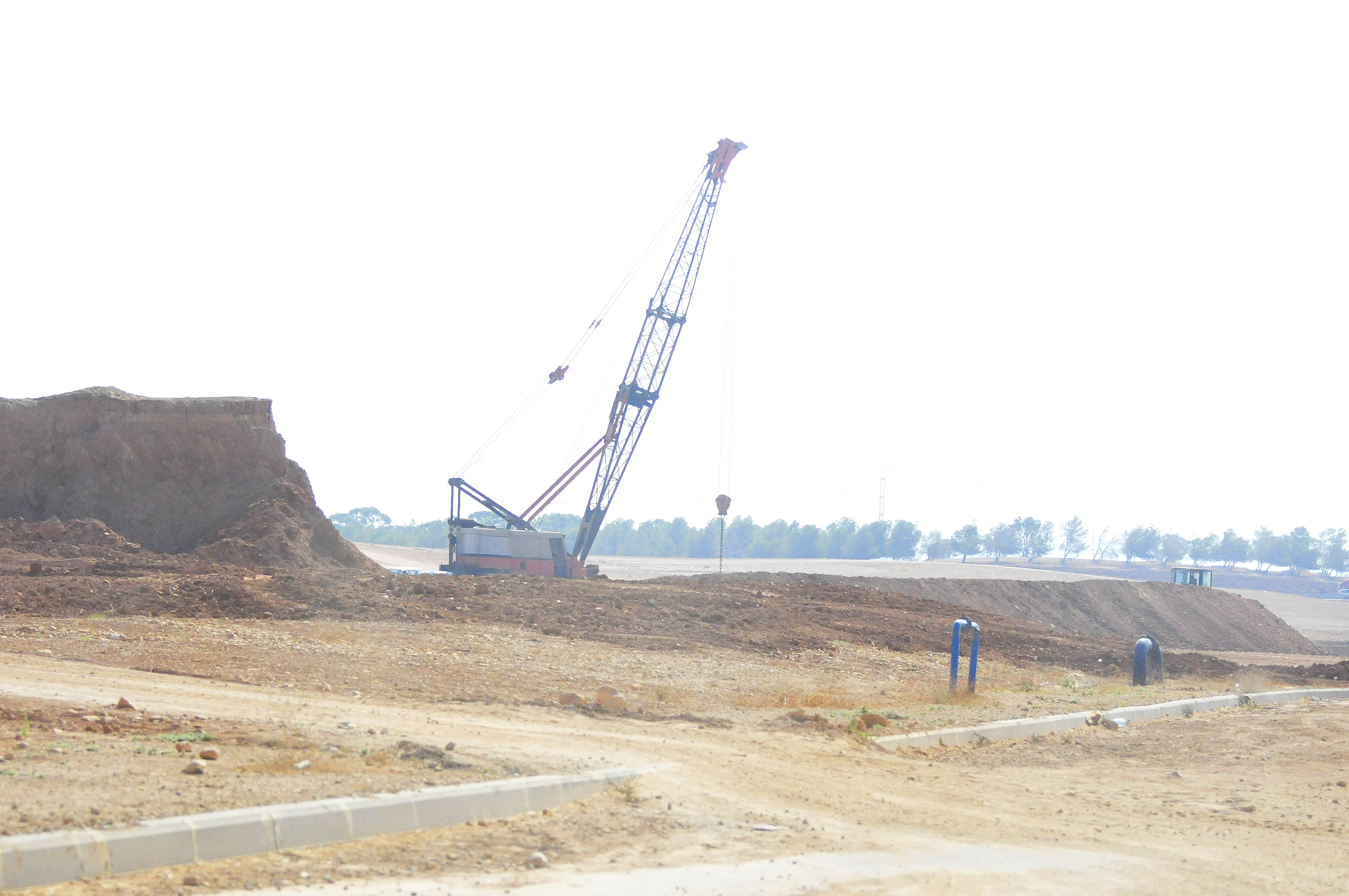
Idan HaNegev construction site, 2012

Idan HaNegev Industrial Park (Hebrew: עידן הנגב, lit. 'The Negev Era') is an industrial park being built southeast of the Bedouin city of Rahat, Israel. The goal is to alleviate unemployment in the local Bedouin population. It is situated in a zone under the jurisdiction of Bnei Shimon Regional Council, between Lehavim and Rahat, close to the city of Beersheba. It will cover an area of some 3,500 dunams (3.5 km^{2}). Some Local Bedouin leaders praised the initiative. According to Rahat Mayor Faiz Abu Sahiban, "it is a good solution which could considerably reduce unemployment in the city, particularly among Bedouin women". However other Bedouin say government-subsidized investment perks mostly benefit large Jewish-owned companies that are under no obligation to hire Bedouins. "It's not answering the needs of the people," said Jihad Elubra, manager at Mati, a government-funded nonprofit group that assists Bedouin-owned businesses in southern Israel. "It's only helping big companies"

== History ==
Idan HaNegev is the first Jewish-Bedouin project of its kind. The industrial park was inaugurated in April 2010. The cornerstone was laid by the mayors of the three local authorities involved in the project, and also by two ministers: Industry, Trade and Labor Minister Binyamin Ben-Eliezer and Galilee Development Minister Silvan Shalom. The three owners of the park will share the profit: Rahat owns 44 per cent of the stock; Bnei Shimon Regional Council - 39 per cent (the park will be placed on its territory, and it will play an active role in its administration); Lehavim - 17 per cent.

According to the data of the Industry, Trade and Labor Ministry, the employment rate among the Bedouin is 35 percent, the lowest of any sector in Israeli society. According to some estimates, 81 percent of the Bedouin women of working age are unemployed (2012), mainly due to conservative traditions of the Bedouin. On the other hand, the Bedouin of Negev are the fastest growing sector of the Israeli society - they double their size every 15 years.

When finished, the park will open new employment opportunities for the Bedouins of Rahat (population of over 53,000 people, as of 2012), Hura (over 17,500), Lakiya (nearly 10,000), Shaqib al-Salam (over 7,700) and other Bedouin localities nearby.

As Industry, Trade and Labor Minister Binyamin Ben-Eliezer put it, "the low participation rate of this population in the labor force hurts, not only the Bedouin, but the economy, its growth potential and the state as a whole. Growing employment inequality causes significant social issues and endangers the possibility of shared life here in Israel".

The park's proximity to Beer Sheva, Highway 6 and the railway station at Lehavim, as well as low municipal taxes and state subsidies, make Idan Hanegev an attractive location for major companies.

== Facilities ==
There will be at least 130 new factories, an additional hospital for the Negev and a technical institute, most of them currently in the planning stage. Additional hospital beds are needed to lessen the load of Soroka Medical Center. A new Harvard University campus will be established inside in industrial zone. It will be the first campus built in a Bedouin city. Ben-Gurion University of the Negev will oversee the new campus' operations, and it will be considered a BGU branch.

Carbonated drink firm SodaStream has received a government permit to build a new plant in Idan HaNegev. It will invest some NIS 130 million in its construction. When finished, the plant will provide employment opportunities to around 1,000 workers, many of them Bedouins. Cargal packaging company also announced that it is willing to move their factory, situated in Lod to a new industrial park, but apparently it will try to keep most of their 320 workers by offering them transportation to the new plant. On the other hand, in case Cargal finally decides to make this step, the state will provide it with special funding of more than NIS 30 million and offer fringe benefits.

== See also ==
- Negev Bedouin
