= SodaStream =

Global manufacturing company

SodaStream International Ltd.
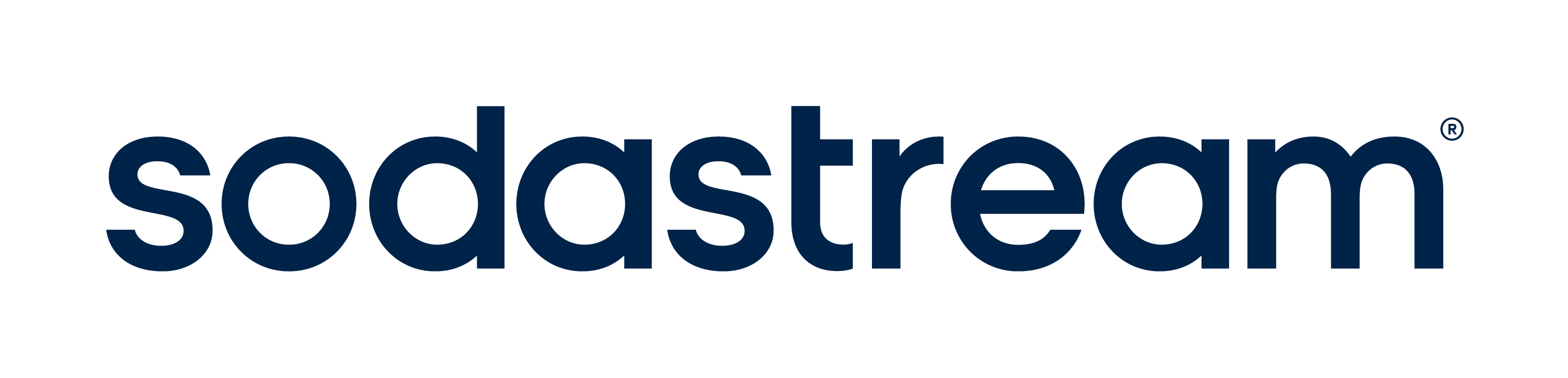

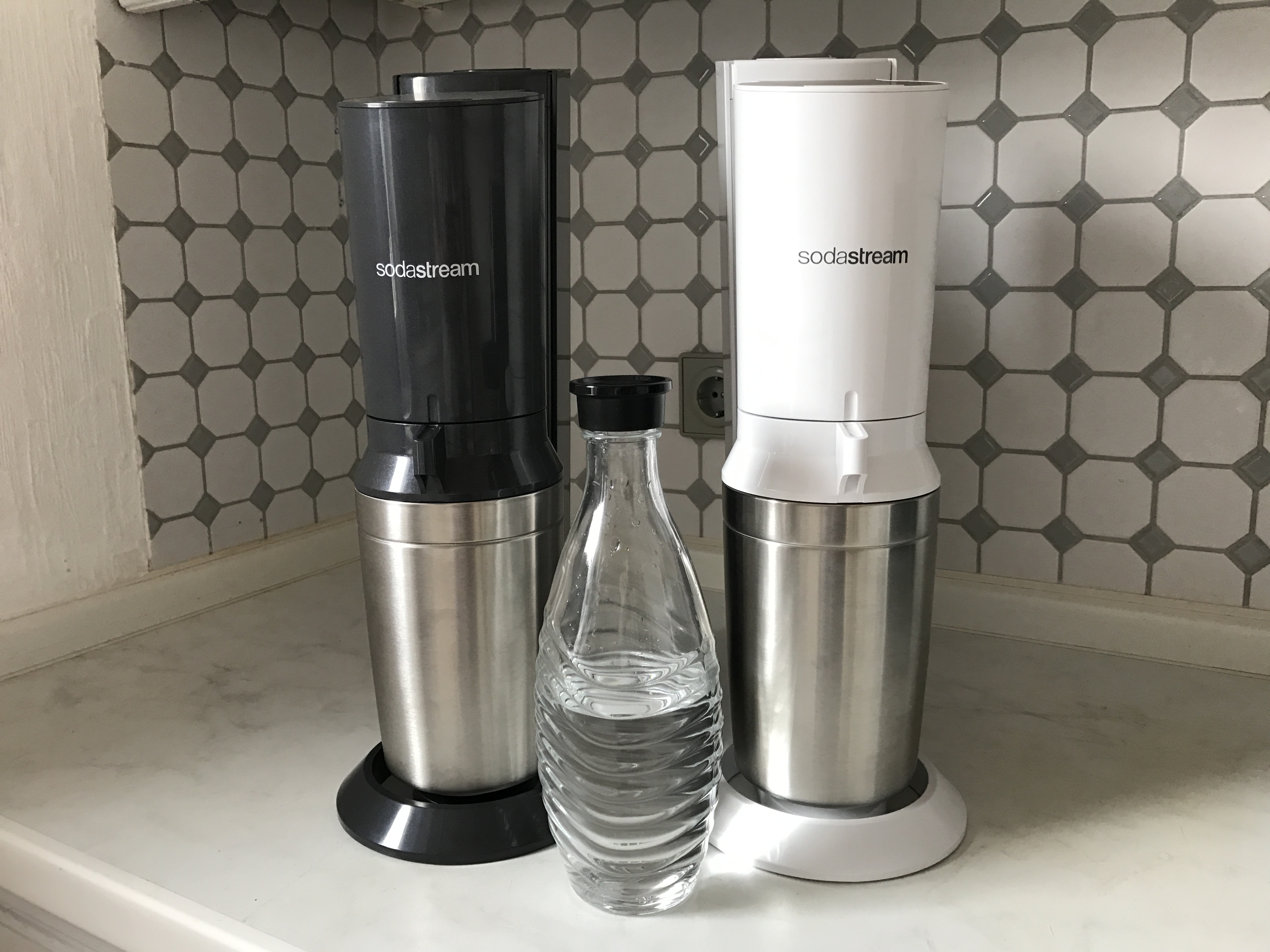
- Type: Subsidiary
- Industry: Carbonated drinks
- Founded: 1903; 123 years ago England, United Kingdom
- Founder: Guy Hugh Gilbey
- Headquarters: Kfar Saba, Israel
- Products: Home carbonation systems
- Revenue: US$543.37 million (2017)
- Operating income: US$81.40 million (2017)
- Net income: US$74.40 million (2017)
- Total assets: US$452.73 million (2015)
- Total equity: US$334.19 million (2015)
- Number of employees: 1,950 (2015)
- Parent: PepsiCo, Inc.
- Website: sodastream.com

SodaStream International Ltd. is a global manufacturing company and PepsiCo subsidiary headquartered in Kfar Saba, Israel. It is best known as the maker of the consumer home carbonation product of the same name. The company's soda machines, in the style of soda siphons, add carbon dioxide to water from a pressurized cylinder to create carbonated water for drinking. It also sells more than 100 types of concentrated syrups and flavourings that are used in the process of making carbonated drinks. In 2018, SodaStream distributed its products to 80,000 individual retail stores across 45 countries.

The company was originally founded in 1903 in England as an independent associate of London-based gin distillers W & A Gilbey Ltd. The company would later create their first mass market machine for home carbonation in 1955, which would grow to have widespread popularity throughout the UK. After it was purchased in 1998 by Soda-Club, SodaStream's Israeli distributor, it was relaunched with an emphasis on healthier drinks and an expanded global presence. Finding success in the US market, it later went public on the Nasdaq stock exchange in November 2010. In August 2018, the company was acquired by PepsiCo for US$3.2 billion. PepsiCo wanted to reduce its reliance on sugary drinks; SodaStream has since launched a variety of PepsiCo flavours into their range.

Until 2015, the company's principal manufacturing facility was located in Mishor Adumim, an industrial park within the Israeli settlement of Ma'ale Adumim in the Occupied West Bank, which generated controversy and a boycott campaign.

== Products ==
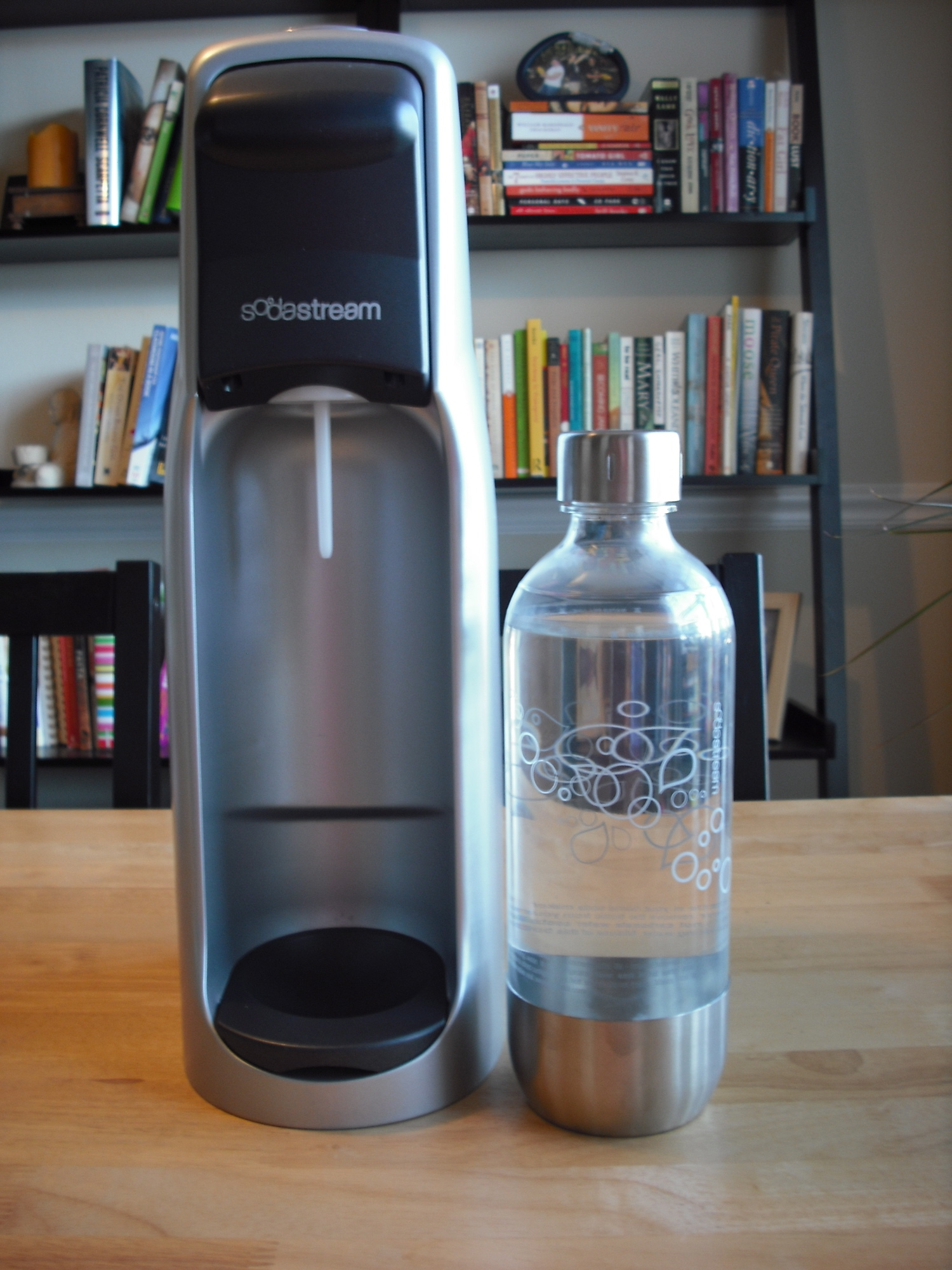
Sodastream machine and bottle

=== Sparkling water makers ===
The SodaStream Sparkling Water Maker is a device that forces carbon dioxide (CO_{2}) gas (stored under pressure in a cylinder) into water, making it sparkling (fizzy). The product includes a machine, a carbon dioxide cylinder, and one or more reusable beverage bottles. The bottle, filled with water, is inserted into the machine, and with a button push or two, compressed CO_{2} from the cylinder is injected, creating carbonated water. Varieties of concentrated syrups are available, to create regular or diet soft drinks by adding a small amount of concentrate to the bottle after carbonation.

In 2012, SodaStream teamed with Yves Béhar to introduce SodaStream Source, a line of soda machines designed with a special emphasis on sustainability. Béhar's design earned SodaStream a Good Housekeeping Institute seal of approval in 2013.

In 2022, SodaStream launched three sparkling water machines: the Terra, the Duo and the Art. The models employ the "Quick Connect" system enabling CO_{2} cylinders to be attaching by clicking instead of screwing. The Duo was named for its compatibility with both reusable plastic bottles and glass bottles, while the Art newly featured a lever allowing users to choose their own carbonation level.

In 2023, SodaStream began selling the E-Terra and E-Duo models, which differ from the Terra and Duo by incorporating an electric interface.

In 2024, the company launched the Enso model, which was notable for its minimalist stainless steel design by Naoto Fukasawa.

=== Flavours ===
Different flavours are created by adding fruit-flavoured concentrates. In the past, several famous brands were available in SodaStream concentrate form including Tizer, Fanta, Sunkist and Irn-Bru.

SodaStream and Kraft Foods entered into a partnership in January 2012 involving the use of the Crystal Light and Country Time brand flavours with the SodaStream home carbonation system. That July, the two companies expanded their partnership to include the Kool-Aid flavour line. In 2013, SodaStream partnered with Ocean Spray to market three Ocean Spray flavours for use with the SodaStream home soda maker.

In 2020, following the company's acquisition by PepsiCo two years earlier, SodaStream partnered with PepsiCo brand Bubly to create Bubly Drops, which included six fruit flavours for SodaStream drinks. The following year, SodaStream released several prominent PepsiCo brands as new flavours, including Pepsi, Pepsi Max and 7 Up.

Additional PepsiCo brand SodaStream flavours followed in the coming years, with Mountain Dew debuting in 2024 and Pepsi Wild Cherry in 2025.

=== Other products ===
In February 2013, SodaStream and Samsung announced that Samsung refrigerators with built-in SodaStream sparkling water dispensers would be available in the United States beginning in April.

In 2025, the company launched the Fizz & Go, a stainless steel bottle that connects directly to the sparkling water maker and is meant for "on the go" use.

== History ==
=== Early history ===
The forerunner of the machine, the "apparatus for aerating liquids", was created in 1903 by Guy Hugh Gilbey of the London gin distillers W & A Gilbey Ltd. and was sold to the upper classes (including the royal household). Flavoured concentrates such as cherry ciderette and sarsaparilla were introduced in the 1920s, along with commercial carbonation machines.

In the 1930s, SodaStream introduced the Vantas, also known as "The Penny Monster," a model that was sold to shopkeepers to prepare drinks for their customers.

The first mass-market SodaStream machine for home carbonation was introduced in 1955.

=== 1970s-1980s: Management buyout, UK growth, and Cadbury Schweppes acquisition ===
SodaStream machines were popular during the 1970s and 1980s in the UK, and are associated with nostalgia for that period. Their slogan, "Get busy with the fizzy", started as an advertising jingle in 1979 and proved so popular that they added it to their logo. The slogan was dropped in 1996 after 17 years.

In 1971, International Distillers & Vintners, the company that had formed in 1962 from the merger of W & A Gilbey and Justerini & Brooks, sold SodaStream to consumer goods company Reckitt & Colman. In 1974, Reckitt & Colman sold the company to SodaStream head Roger Booth in a management buyout initiated by Booth.

In 1975, SodaStream partnered with appliance manufacturer Kenwood; the latter would market and distribute SodaStream products (with "Kenwood" branding) while the former would provide its CO_{2} cylinders and concentrate mixes. In 1979, SodaStream ended the arrangement, leading Kenwood and its parent company Thorn to produce their own competing machine, the Cascade.

The company, which was controlled during this period by institutional investors led by Anglia Television and the Scottish American Investment Company, saw consistently rising profits from 1975 to the early 1980s. By 1983, SodaStream had 90 percent of the British market and its products could be found in one in ten homes. By 1984, the SodaStream factory in Peterborough employed more than 500 people and played a part in the city's dramatic growth after having been designated a "new town" in 1967.

In 1985, Cadbury Schweppes acquired SodaStream for £26.2 million. SodaStream had experienced losses over the prior year, due to costs of test marketing in the United States and West Germany, as well as problems with the introduction of a new machine in the UK.

=== 1998-2010: Soda-Club era ===
In 1998, SodaStream was bought by Soda-Club, an Israeli company founded in 1991 by Peter Wiseburgh, who from 1978 to 1991 had been Israel's exclusive distributor for SodaStream, creating the world's largest home carbonation systems supplier. In 2003, Soda-Club closed the SodaStream factory in Peterborough, moving the company's gas cylinder refilling and refurbishment department to Germany. Under the ownership of Soda-Club, the brand has been relaunched in many markets, with new machines and new flavours available in 41 countries. During this period, SodaStream began to find success in the US market, going from little to no revenue in 2003 to $7 million in 2008.

In 2007, Israeli private equity firm Fortissimo Capital acquired a controlling interest in SodaStream with an investment of $14 million and named Soda-Club head Daniel Birnbaum CEO. Birnbaum, who was credited with resuscitating the company, remained CEO until 2019.

=== 2010 NASDAQ IPO ===
SodaStream International Ltd. went public on the NASDAQ stock exchange in November 2010. The stock offering was jointly led by J.P. Morgan Securities and Deutsche Bank Securities.

At the time, the IPO was the eighth largest for an Israeli company on the NASDAQ and during the year 2010 one of the top-performing IPOs generally. To celebrate SodaStream's listing on the NASDAQ, CEO Daniel Birnbaum was invited to ring the exchange's closing bell on 3 November 2010.

=== PepsiCo acquisition ===
In August 2018, SodaStream was acquired by PepsiCo for US$3.2 billion. The purchase represented a part of PepsiCo's strategic plan to shift toward offering healthier snack and drink products. In addition, PepsiCo stated that the acquisition was part of a larger corporate initiative focusing on environmentally friendly and cost-effective beverages.

== Marketing and sales ==
Some 20% of households in Sweden owned SodaStream machines as of 2010. In January 2011, the company marked the sale of its millionth soda maker in the country. Europe accounts for 45% of SodaStream's sales.

By May 2012, SodaStream was being sold in over 2,900 Walmart locations in the United States. SodaStream's U.S. sales grew from US$4.4 million in 2007 to $40 million in 2011. Despite record sales, profit margins are declining and in 2013 fell short of targets and investor expectations. Sodastream also sold its product in some Bed Bath & Beyond stores.

Since its acquisition in 2018, SodaStream's sales and reporting have been folded into PepsiCo's corporate reporting.

In its marketing, the company focuses on environmental attractiveness of using tap water and returnable gas cylinders. SodaStream has been involved in environmental projects, including waste reduction, beach cleanup and reforestation.

=== Advertising campaigns ===
In 2010, SodaStream launched an international campaign targeting the bottle and can waste associated with pre-made drinks. The campaign involves the display of 9-cubic-metre cages in various countries, each containing 10,657 empty bottles and cans. When a cage full of empties went on display in Johannesburg, South Africa in 2012, Coca-Cola demanded that SodaStream remove its products from the cages and threatened to sue SodaStream. SodaStream responded by dismissing the threats and announcing that it would display the cage outside Coca-Cola's headquarters in Atlanta.

A 30-second television commercial promoting sustainability, showing commercial brand soda bottles exploding each time a person makes a drink using a SodaStream machine, was banned in the United Kingdom in 2012. Clearcast, the organization that approves TV advertising in the UK, explained that they "thought it was a denigration of the bottled drinks market". The same ad, crafted by Alex Bogusky, ran in the United States, Sweden, Australia, and other countries. An appeal by SodaStream to reverse Clearcast's decision to censor the commercial was rejected. A similar advertisement, which featured a pair of Coca-Cola and Pepsi deliverymen reacting to the exploding bottles, was expected to air during Super Bowl XLVII in February 2013, but was rejected by CBS for its direct references to Coke and Pepsi. The previous SodaStream ad was shown in its place. SodaStream CEO said "The banned ad was a win because of the quality as well as the quantity of the exposure we received".

The company's 2020 advertising campaign featured Snoop Dogg in the United States and Priyanka, the first season winner of Canada's Drag Race, in Canada.

In the years since its acquisition by PepsiCo in 2018, SodaStream has run new advertising campaigns on Earth Day. In 2019, the company announced the "Proud to be Green" challenge, in which people with the last name "Green" and people in cities containing the word "green" received discounts. In 2021, the company ran the "Don't Just Share, Care" campaign with an advertisement featuring Randi Zuckerberg, promoting positive action to combat climate change and criticising slacktivism. In 2022, the company ran an ad campaign in partnership with a nonprofit organization that protects wild sea turtles, with commercials featuring David Hasselhoff.

In June 2021, SodaStream introduced a Pride Month campaign with a digital advertisement featuring Laverne Cox as an animated superhero. The ad promoted a "Rainbow Story" sparkling water maker kit that could be personalised with rainbow markers; SodaStream donated 10% of the profits to LGBTQ+ rights organization ILGA World.

=== Environmental initiatives ===
In 2011, SodaStream partnered with the Israel Union for Environmental Defense to launch an initiative promoting waste reduction and an improvement in the quality of tap water. Also in 2011, SodaStream launched a campaign with Erin O'Connor to raise awareness to the effects of plastic bottle waste on the environment.

As part of the company's support for Climate Week, in 2012 SodaStream donated £1,000 (equivalent to £1161 in 2021) to a school in Crediton, Devon in the United Kingdom to fund an educational beach cleaning initiative. SodaStream partnered with Trees for the Future in 2012 to launch the Replant Our Planet initiative: for each home beverage carbonation system sold from its Rethink Your Soda product line, SodaStream committed to planting hundreds of thousands of trees in Brazil. SodaStream Italy and the Municipality of Venice partnered in 2012 to organize Join the Stream: fight the bottle, a cleanup initiative with its starting point at the Lido di Venezia. Actress Rosario Dawson launched the first annual Unbottle the World Day in New York City in July 2012. The campaign, initiated by SodaStream to raise awareness to the impact of cans and plastic bottles on the environment, calls on the United Nations to designate one day of the year a "Bottle Free Day".

=== Influencer marketing ===
Since 2016, SodaStream has worked with influencer marketing in social media. Influencers include Genevive Lauren Ngo, Chelsea Sousa, and Jada Brown.

== Production facilities ==
SodaStream has 13 production facilities worldwide. From 2016, SodaStream's principal manufacturing facility is in Idan HaNegev Industrial Park north of Beersheba, Israel. The plant provides employment for around 1,400 workers, many of them Negev Bedouins. The cornerstone for the plant was laid in 2011, it opened in 2015. An additional plant, which began operating in 2011 in Ashkelon, produces SodaStream syrups and flavours. Another plant operated in the Alon Tavor industrial zone near the Israeli city of Afula, between 2011 and 2015, but was closed once the Idan HaNegev facility was opened.

In Europe, the company employs 250 people, in two main sites; at SodaStream's European commercial and logistics center, which is located in Rijen, Netherlands and at a manufacturing facility in Limburg an der Lahn, Germany. SodaStream's US headquarters is at Mount Laurel, New Jersey.

=== Boycott campaign and factory relocation ===
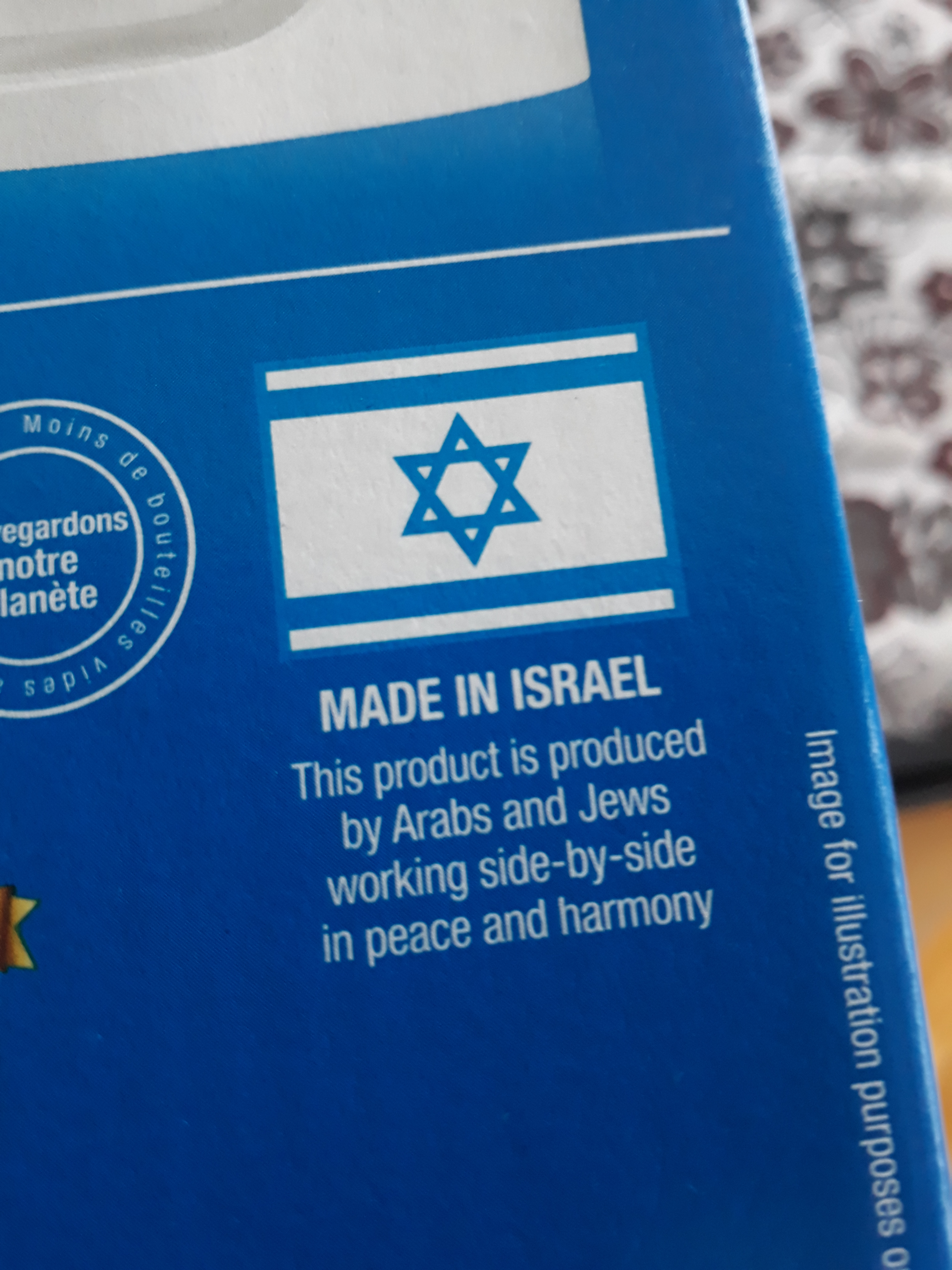
Label on SodaStream packaging

In the early 2010s, as part of the Boycott, Divestment and Sanctions (BDS) activist campaign launched in 2005 to pressure Israel to end the occupation of the West Bank and Gaza, SodaStream was criticized for operating its primary manufacturing plant in the Mishor Adumim industrial zone in the West Bank.

The Court of Justice of the European Union ruled in 2010 that SodaStream was not entitled to claim a "Made in Israel" exemption from EU customs payments for products manufactured in the West Bank because Israeli settlements in the West Bank are outside the territorial scope of the EC–Israel Agreement.

In January 2014, Oxfam accepted the resignation of Scarlett Johansson, an American actress, as ambassador for that organisation, a role she had held for eight years, after she became a brand ambassador for SodaStream. Oxfam has stated that "businesses, such as SodaStream, that operate in settlements further the ongoing poverty and denial of rights of the Palestinian communities that we work to support" and opposes all trade with the settlements citing their illegality under international law. Johansson reportedly resigned because of "a fundamental difference of opinion in regards to the boycott, divestment and sanctions movement". In her statement she described SodaStream as "not only committed to the environment but to building a bridge to peace between Israel and Palestine, supporting neighbours working alongside each other, receiving equal pay, equal benefits and equal rights". SodaStream CEO Daniel Birnbaum also accused Oxfam of supporting the BDS movement against Israel as a whole, a charge Oxfam denied, saying that "this is about trade from the settlements" and specific to settlements outside Israel's pre-1967 border. which Oxfam states, due to their location, pose an obstacle to any future two-state solution.

According to Birnbaum, the boycott had no impact on the growth rate of SodaStream, and he said, all SodaStream products sold in Norway, Sweden and Finland are manufactured in China.

Human Rights Watch stated that "It is impossible to ignore the Israeli system of unlawful discrimination, land confiscation, natural resource theft, and forced displacement of Palestinians in the occupied West Bank, where SodaStream is located". The United Church of Canada launched a campaign to boycott SodaStream products manufactured in the West Bank.

Birnbaum said that the factories are apolitical and described the factory as "building bridges between us and the Palestinian population, and we provide our Palestinian employees with respectable employment opportunities and an appropriate salary and benefits". SodaStream employed 500 West Bank Palestinians. Addressing the location of SodaStream's Ma'ale Adumim plant, Birnbaum said the choice was made by company founder Peter Weissburgh, back in the 1990s, long before SodaStream was taken over by the current owners, who appointed Birnbaum in 2007.

In July 2014, SodaStream fired 60 Palestinian workers after they filed a complaint about not receiving sufficient food to break Ramadan fasts during night shifts. The workers were not allowed to bring their own food into the plant due to Jewish dietary restrictions being enforced. According to SodaStream the workers had called for a wildcat strike. SodaStream claimed that the workers were given a hearing and were not denied severance pay.

SodaStream announced that its factory in Ma'ale Adumim would be closed by the end of 2015 in order to save $9 million in production costs. The plant's operations were transferred to a new factory in Lehavim, where it reportedly employed "a significant number of Bedouin Arabs". The move laid off 500 Palestinian workers, although 74 Palestinian workers moved with SodaStream when it relocated.

== See also ==
- List of Israeli companies
- Economy of Israel
