= Department of Local Government and the Environment =

In the Isle of Man, the Department of Local Government and the Environment (Manx: Rheynn Reiltys Ynnydagh as y Çhymmyltaght) or DLGE/DoLGE was responsible for the environment, social housing policy, local authorities, building control, health and safety, town planning, listed buildings and historic sites, waste disposal, conservation areas, management of the government estate, and provision of a Government Laboratory to monitor pollution, air and water quality, radioactivity and the Island's official mapping service.

The department was replaced during the April 2010 Government restructure.

== Previous Ministers for Local Government and the Environment ==
- John Rimmington MHK, 2004–2006
- Pamela Crowe MLC, 2002–2004
- Walter Gilbey MHK, 1999–2002
- Edgar Quine MHK, 1996–1999
- Terry Groves MHK, 1994–1996
- Tony Brown MHK, 1989–1994
- Dominic Delaney MHK, 1986–1989

== Previous Chairmen of the Local Government Board ==
- Sir Miles Walker MHK, 1982–1986
- Unknown, 1976–1982
- Percy Radcliffe MHK, 1971–1976
- Unknown, 1946–1976
- John Cowin MLC, 1946–?
- Unknown, 1922–1946
- Lieutenant Governor of the Isle of Man, until 1922
