= Rahat =

Bedouin city in Israel

Rahat: רהט; رهط
- City (from 1994)
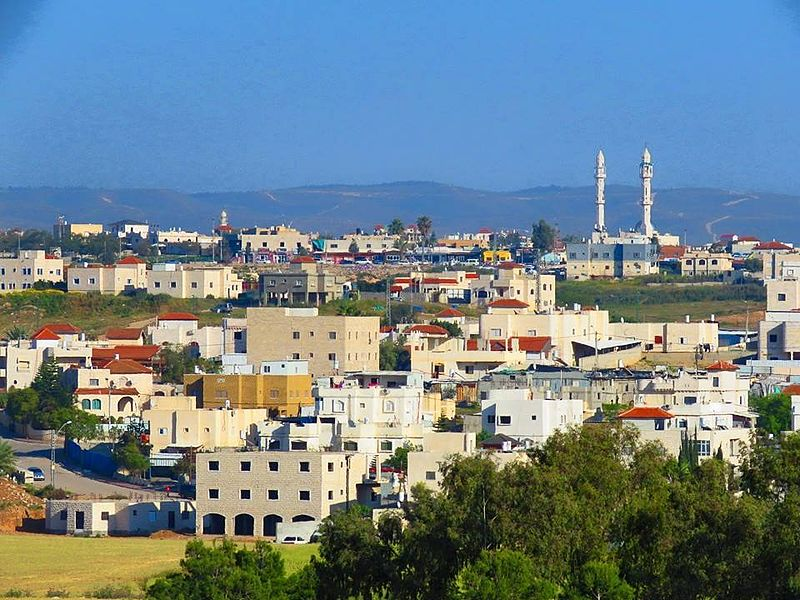
- Rahat City

- Municipal seal

- Location within Northwest Negev region of Israel Location within Israel
- Coordinates: 31°23′33″N 34°45′16″E
- Country: Israel
- District: Southern
- Subdistrict: Beersheba
- Natural Region: Be'er Sheva
- Founded: 1972

Government
  - Mayor: Talal Al Krenawi

Area
  - Total: 42,000 dunams (42 km^{2}; 16 sq mi)

Population (2024)
  - Total: 77,997
  - Density: 1,900/km^{2} (4,800/sq mi)
- Name meaning: Calm, comfort

Rahat (Arabic: رهط, Hebrew: רַהַט) is an Arab Bedouin city in the Southern District of Israel. In 2024 it had a population of 77,997. As such, it is the largest Bedouin city in Israel, and the only one to have city status. It is the largest Arab city in Israel.

Rahat is one of seven Bedouin townships in the Negev desert with approved plans and developed infrastructure. The other six are Hura, Tel as-Sabi (Tel Sheva), Ar'arat an-Naqab (Ar'ara BaNegev), Lakiya, Kuseife (Kseife) and Shaqib al-Salam (Segev Shalom).

== History ==
The region of the city was formerly owned by Al-Tayaha tribe (Al-Hezeel clan). Until the year 1972 the town was called "El Huzaiyil" (Arabic: الهزيل) before changing its name. In 1972 Rahat was considered by the government of Israel as a new settlement for Bedouin who lived in the surrounding area without permanent domicile. Until 1980, Rahat was part of the Bnei Shimon Regional Council and from then on (until 1994) it was a local council (administered by a private board until 1989). In 1994 it was recognized as a city – the first Bedouin city in Israel.

After the 7 October attacks in 2023, several Qassam Brigade militants from the Gaza Strip infiltrated Rahat, located thirty kilometres from Gaza, representing the furthest extent of the incursions . Over a month after the attack, two militants were arrested in the city by Israeli police.

== Urban development ==
The city has a total of 33 neighborhoods. All but one of the neighborhoods consist entirely of separate Bedouin clans, but one is a mixed-clan neighborhood. Between each neighborhood there is a wadi. The city also has a market, public and commercial services, neighborhood parks, public areas, women's employment centers, children's play areas, and several mosques.

== Climate ==
Rahat has a semi-arid climate (Köppen climate classification: BSh). The average annual temperature is 19.6 °C (67.3 °F), and around 286 mm (11.26 in) of precipitation falls annually.

Climate data for Rahat
Month	Jan	Feb	Mar	Apr	May	Jun	Jul	Aug	Sep	Oct	Nov	Dec	Year
Mean daily maximum °C (°F)	17.1 (62.8)	18.2 (64.8)	20.8 (69.4)	24.3 (75.7)	28 (82)	30.6 (87.1)	31.7 (89.1)	32 (90)	30.3 (86.5)	28.5 (83.3)	24 (75)	18.8 (65.8)	25.4 (77.6)
Daily mean °C (°F)	12.2 (54.0)	13 (55)	15.2 (59.4)	18.2 (64.8)	21.6 (70.9)	24.2 (75.6)	25.6 (78.1)	26 (79)	24.4 (75.9)	22.3 (72.1)	18.3 (64.9)	13.9 (57.0)	19.6 (67.2)
Mean daily minimum °C (°F)	7.3 (45.1)	7.9 (46.2)	9.6 (49.3)	12.2 (54.0)	15.2 (59.4)	17.8 (64.0)	19.6 (67.3)	20 (68)	18.5 (65.3)	16.1 (61.0)	12.6 (54.7)	9 (48)	13.8 (56.9)
Average precipitation mm (inches)	69 (2.7)	51 (2.0)	42 (1.7)	9 (0.4)	3 (0.1)	0 (0)	0 (0)	0 (0)	0 (0)	8 (0.3)	42 (1.7)	62 (2.4)	286 (11.3)

== Economy ==
The township is situated close to Beersheva so its economy is related to that of the city. There is an industrial park in the suburbs of Rahat, and another new park was founded on 2015 called Idan HaNegev. Several more industrial parks are situated in the area - Beersheba and Hura. Residents also work in the services industry in Beersheba. There are several organizations that promote entrepreneurship among the 210,000 Bedouin living in the Negev, primarily aimed at Bedouin women. One of them is Maof, and another one focused on finding jobs is called Rian.

In 2005 the city was one of the first to be connected to the WiMAX network.

In 2007 the Center for Jewish-Arab economic development initiated an entrepreneurship and employment project for Rahat residents. Approximately 40 Bedouin women took part in it and received training in job search, computer skills and business management. Twelve of them have launched their own businesses (shops, clothing, hairdressing, restaurant and catering, sewing).

In 2009 the city was unable to pay its water fees and the water supply was disconnected for five hours. Today Rahat has a water company that is in charge of supplying water and taking care of the sewers.

In 2006 Rahat collected 59% of Arnona taxes, making it the Arab city with the highest tax collection rate for the Arabic population for that year. In 2012 Rahat increased tax collection to 71%. In 2013 Rahat was collecting tax from its residents and also got 44% of a nearby industrial park.

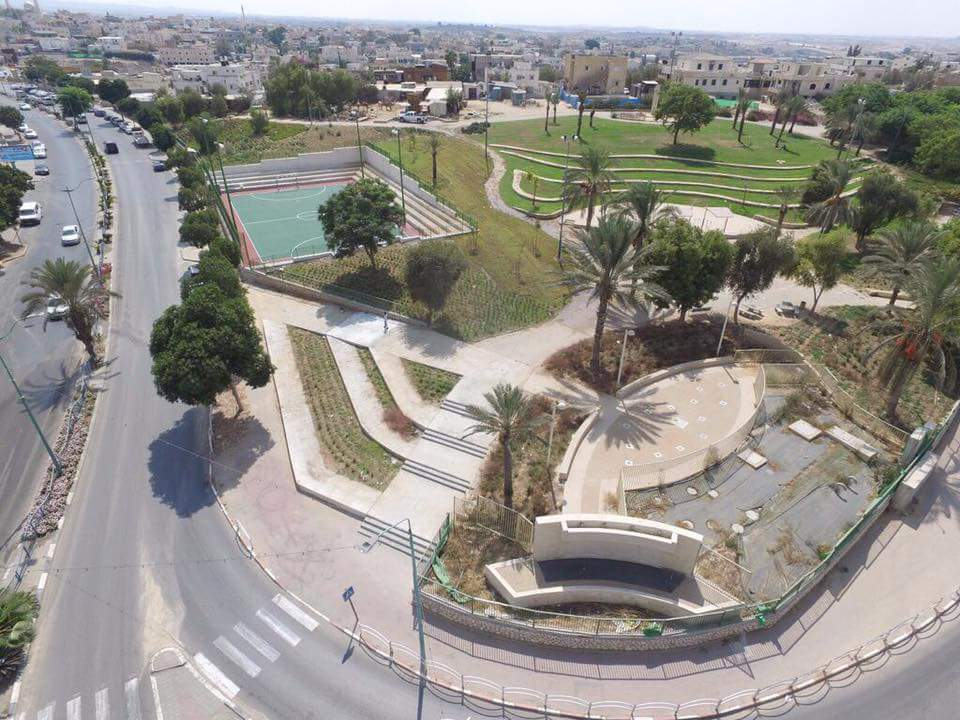
Rahat Central Park

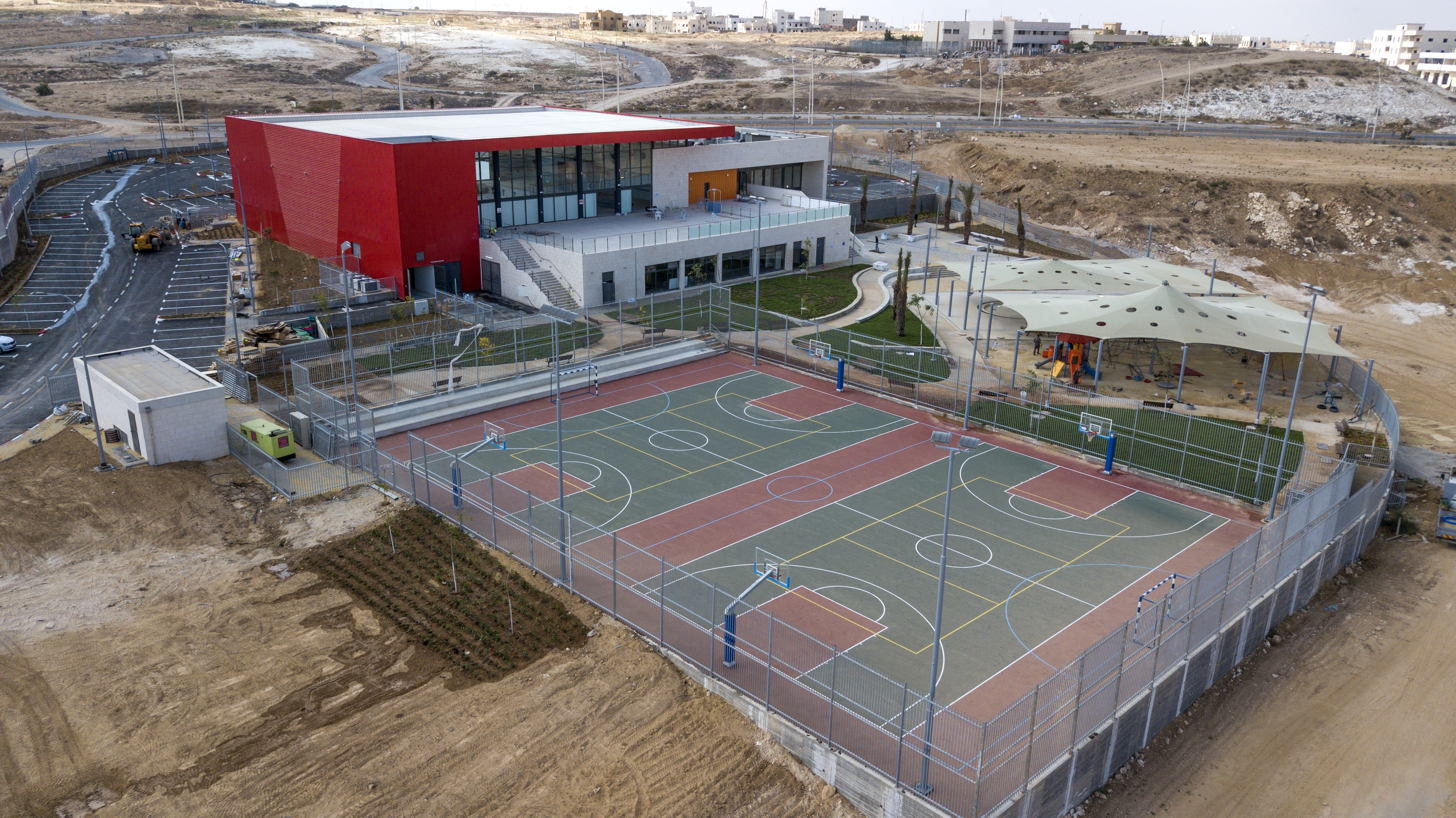
Rahat sports center

In 2014 the city’s unemployment rate was 34%, dropping to 14% in 2017. The improvement has been attributed to a new industrial park, Idan HaNegev.

== Culture projects ==
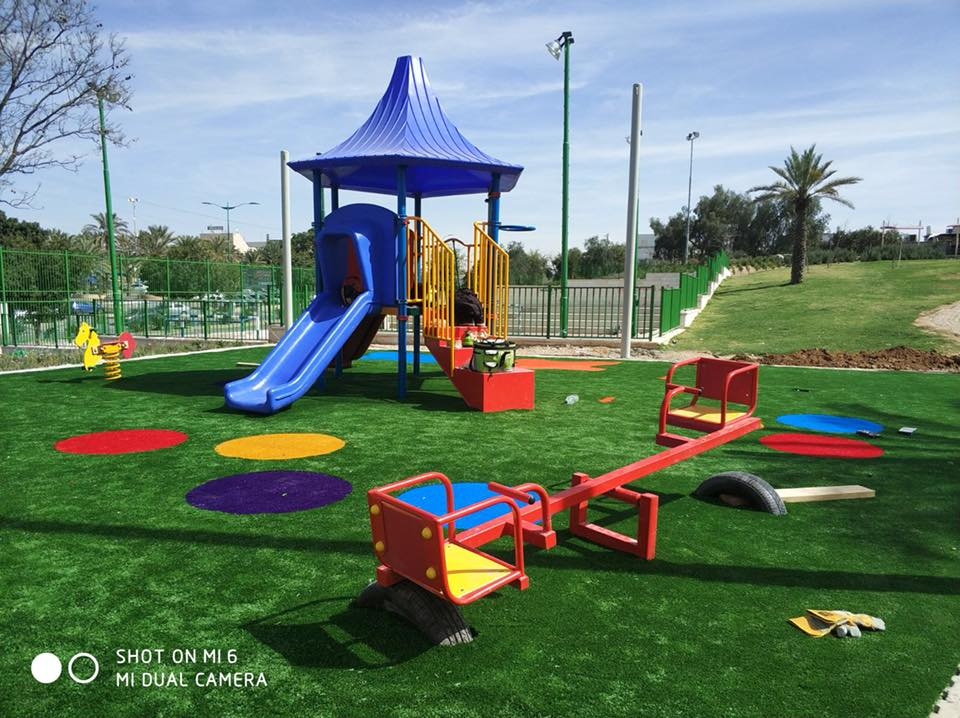
Playground in Rahat

There are a number of organizations carrying out different activities aimed at supporting and facilitating entrepreneurship in Israel's South in order to further integrate the 210,000 Bedouin living in the Negev into Israel's mainstream economy. They are primarily aimed at Bedouin women.

Twenty Arab-Bedouin women from the towns of Rahat, Lakiya, Tel Sheva, Segev Shalom, Kuseife and Rachma participated in a sewing course for fashion design at the Amal College in Beer Sheva, including lessons on sewing and cutting, personal empowerment and business initiatives.

There is a volunteer program to teach English to the Bedouin schoolchildren of Rahat.

Social and Environmental Leadership Program was established in Rahat in the mid-2000s, initiated by young local residents.

== Education ==
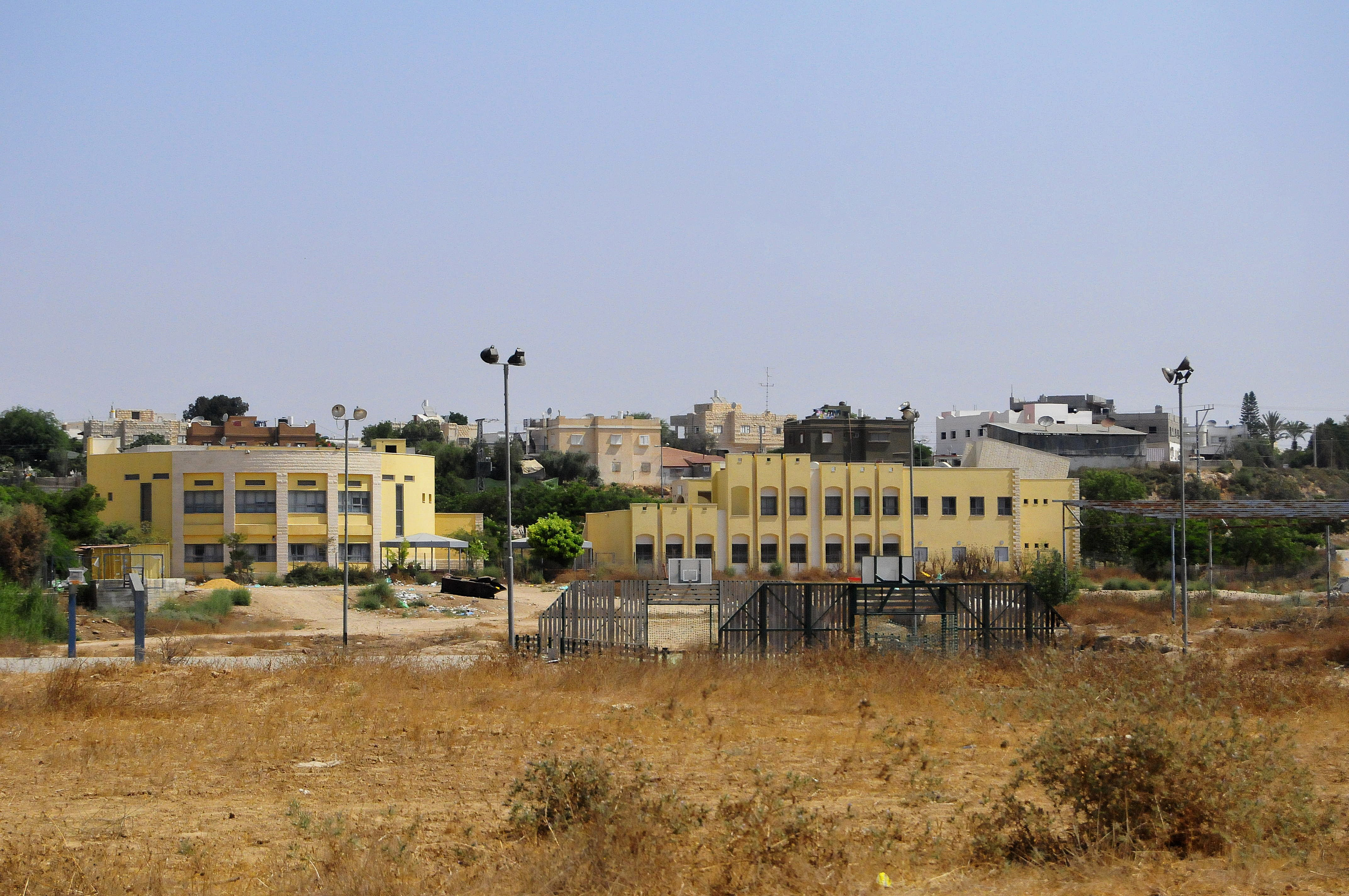
Rahat school

Since the city of Beersheva is in close proximity to Rahat, most Bedouin students from Rahat study at Ben-Gurion University of the Negev, some also at Sapir Academic College in Sderot. Soon a new Harvard University campus will be established in Rahat - inside Idan HaNegev Industrial Park. It will be the first campus built in this Bedouin city. Ben-Gurion University of the Negev will oversee the new campus' operations, and it will be considered a BGU branch.

== Health and public services ==
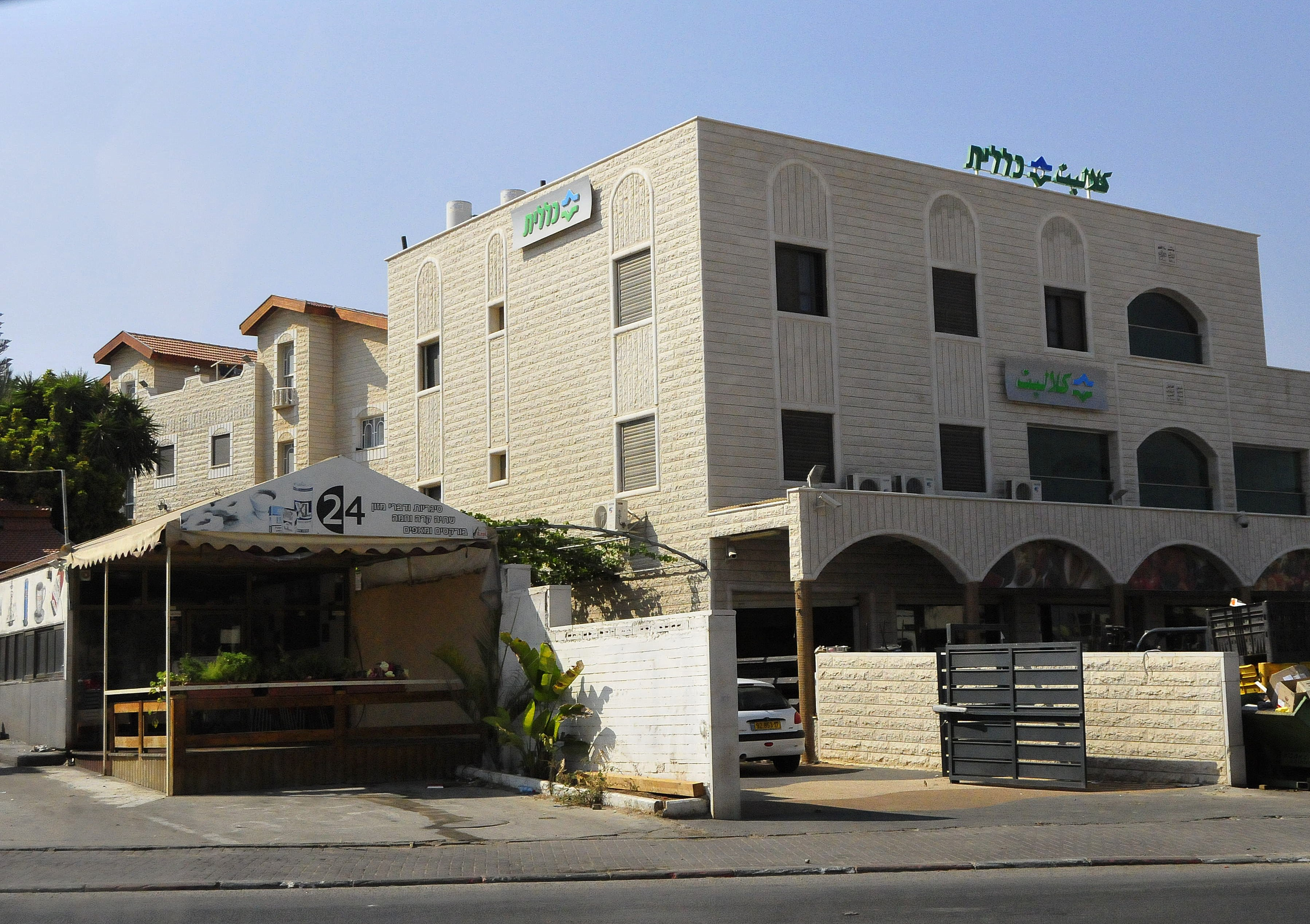
A medical clinic in Rahat

Rahat as a city has a number of public services, including medical services, schooling, labor, shopping, etc. There are branches of several health funds (medical clinics) in Rahat: Leumit, Clalit, Maccabi and several perinatal (baby care) centers Tipat Halav. In 2004 a new police station was opened, and has around 70 staff policemen. There is a community center in Rahat with a number of clubs for youth.

== Demographics ==
Historical population
Year	Pop.	±% p.a.
1983	9,200	—
1995	23,200	+8.01%
2008	50,000	+6.08%
2015	62,400	+3.22%
2022	71,355	+1.93%
2026	82,549	+3.71%

According to the Israeli Central Bureau of Statistics, in 2001 the ethnic make-up of the city was almost completely Arab Bedouin, without a significant Jewish population (see also: Population groups in Israel), making it the largest Bedouin settlement in Israel. Rahat's society is considered a young one, as more than half of its residents are under the age of 18.

Members of several Bedouin family clans reside in Rahat:

- Al-Tarabin: The ancient inhabitants of the Negev, their name Tarabin came the ancient Arabic name of the Negev region (Turban, تربان).
- Al-Tayaha: The ancient inhabitants of Sinai, The word Al-Tiyaha means "the lost ones" in Arabic, their original home was the Al-Tih plateau in central of Sinai.
- Al-Azazma: along with Al-Tayaha and Al-Tarabin are thought to be the indigenous pre-Islamic bedouins of Negev and Sinai. Probably related to ancient Arabians who inhabited the area like the Nabateans.
- Al-Howeitat: from northwestern Arabia.
- Al-Shorbagy: from Turkish Anatolian roots.
- Al-Qrenawi: Turkish Anatolian-Arab tribal confederation originally from the city of Al-Qurein of Egypt.
- Al-Tawarah: tribal confederation originally from the Al-Tur region in Sinai.

According to the CBS, in 2001 there were 16,300 males and 16,100 females. The population of the city was spread out, with 65.2% 19 years of age or younger, 15.8% between 20 and 29, 12.0% between 30 and 44, 4.7% from 45 to 59, 0.9% from 60 to 64, and 1.4% 65 years of age or older. The population growth rate in 2001 was 5.9%. Also according to the CBS, at the end of 2010 there were 26,700 males and 26,400 females. Some 60.4% of Rahat's population were 19 years old or younger, 15.4% between 20 and 29, 15.3% between 30 and 44, 5.9% from 45 to 59, 1% from 60 to 64, and 2% 65 years of age or older. The population growth rate has decreased significantly to 2.7%.

According to city's mayor the city is home to an estimated 7,000 illegal immigrants at any given time.

== Tourism ==
Rahat is known to be a center of authentic food tourism. The city receives many tourists from Israel and from abroad, especially during the Islamic holy month of Ramadan. Most of the tourists like to be hosted in houses around Rahat where the lady owner of the house cooks traditional Bedouin food and tells stories about the Bedouin culture.

== Transportation ==
In June 2007 a new Lehavim-Rahat Railway Station was opened on the eastern side of Rahat. It serves both the Bedouin city of Rahat and the Jewish city of Lehavim. It made it more accessible for the local residents to work and study in Beersheba and other parts of the country. There are buses operated by the Galim and Dan BaDarom bus companies. For a long period of time there were only private transit buses in the city, but in 2009 the bus transportation system was substantially improved and larger, national bus companies started to enter the city.

== Archaeology ==
In 2019, one of the earliest rural mosques in the world was unearthed in Rahat, apparently dating to a century or two after the founding of Islam.

== Voting Patterns ==
In the 2022 election, 91 percent of voters in Rahat voted for the Arab parties, while 7 percent voted for the parties of the center-left coalition led by Yair Lapid and 2 percent voted for the parties of the right-wing coalition led by Benjamin Netanyahu. Among the voters for the Arab parties, 71 percent voted for Ra'am, while 15 percent voted for Balad and 14 percent voted for the Hadash–Ta'al list.

In the 2026 election, 98 percent of voters in Rahat voted for the Arab parties, while 0.8 percent voted for the parties of the center-left coalition led by Gadi Eisenkot and 0.3 percent voted for the parties of the right-wing coalition led by Benjamin Netanyahu. Among the voters for the Arab parties, 86 percent voted for Ra'am, while 14 percent voted for the Joint List. Voter turnout increased 64 percent from the 2022 election.

== Notable people ==
- Talal Alkernawi, Rahat Mayor
- Suleiman Al-Shafhe, journalist, formerly a Channel 2 reporter covering the Palestinian issues
- Ahmed Alansasra, artist
- Kamla Abu Zeila, a Bedouin female documentary filmmaker
- Yusra Abu-Kaff, a Bedouin filmmaker
- Ahmad Amrani, one of the leaders of the Green movement. In 2002, established “Green Rahat,” the first environmental organization in Rahat to deal with the city's environmental problems
- Jamal Alkirnawi, founder of the educational program A New Dawn in the Negev for Bedouin youth-at-risk
- Amran El Krenawy (born 1996), footballer
- Ouda Tarabin (born 1981), an Israeli Bedouin imprisoned by Egypt for illegal border crossing

== Gallery ==
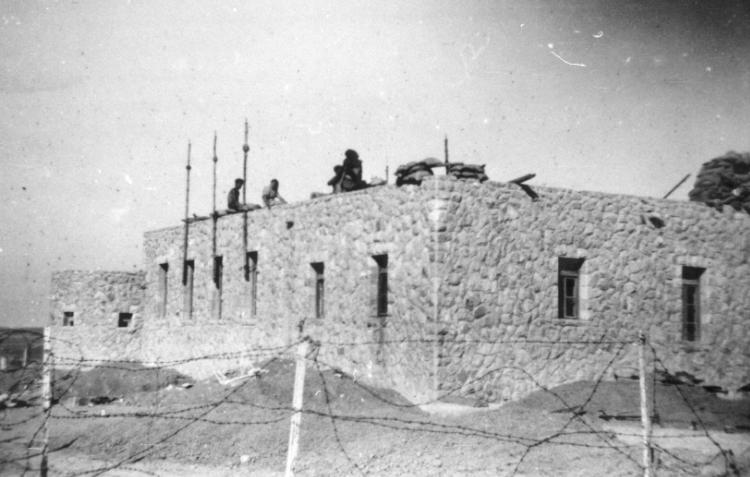
Members of the Yiftach Brigade, First Battalion stationed in Sheikh Huzeil Police Station, 1948

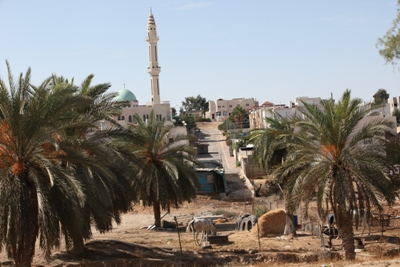

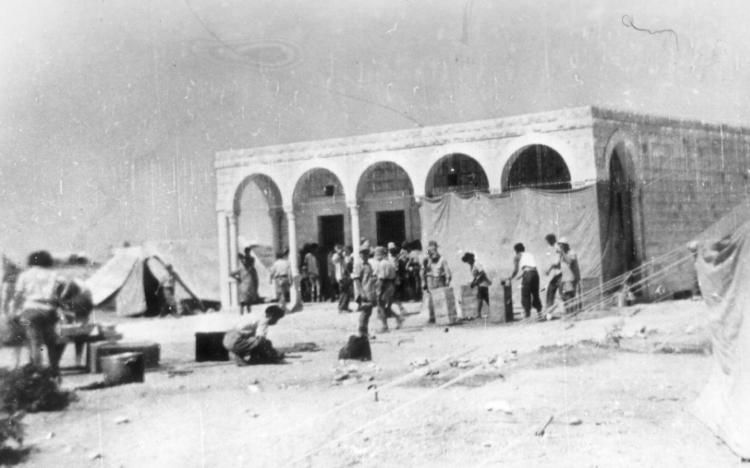
Members of Yiftach Brigade in al-Hazeil, 1948

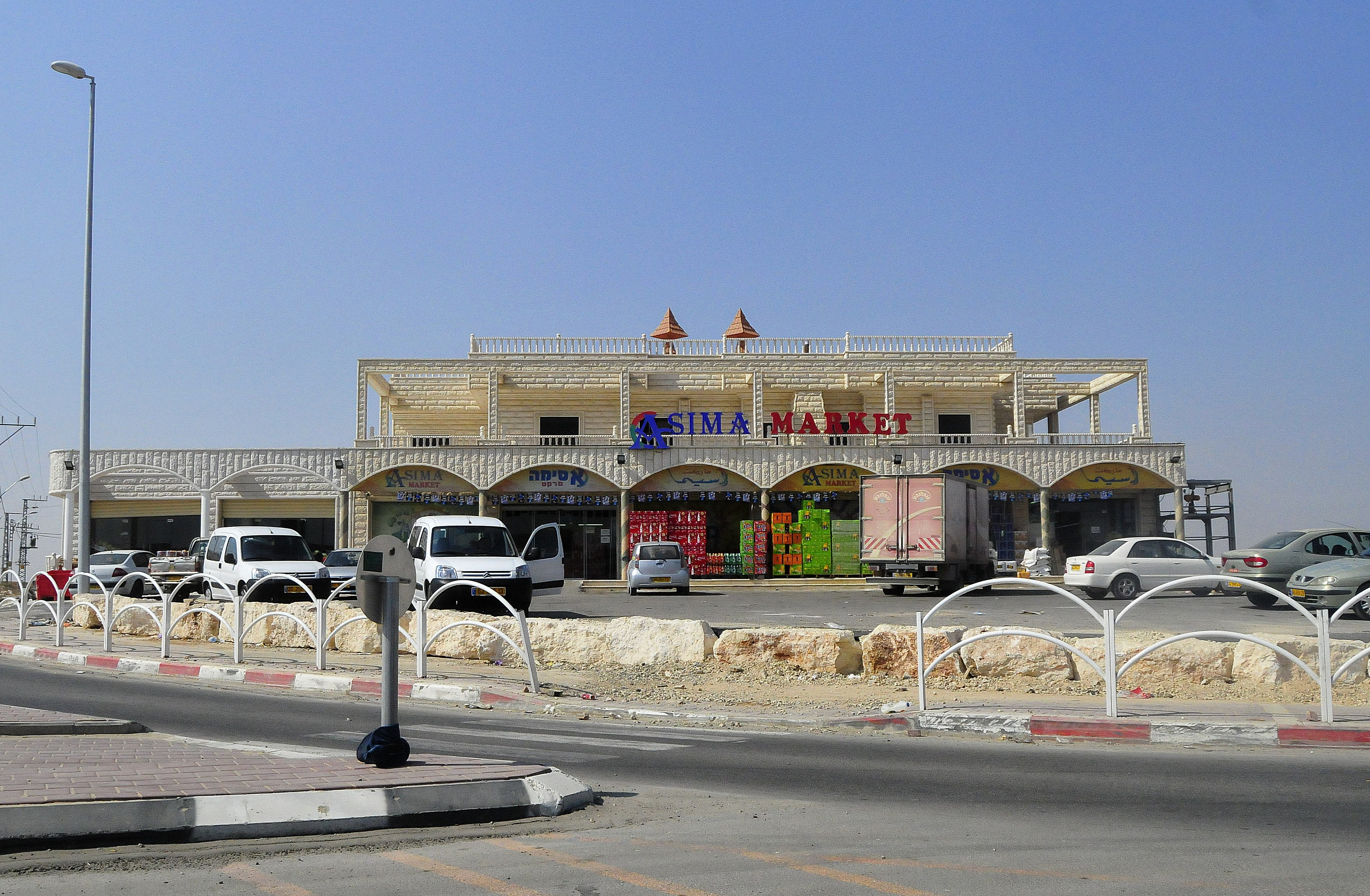

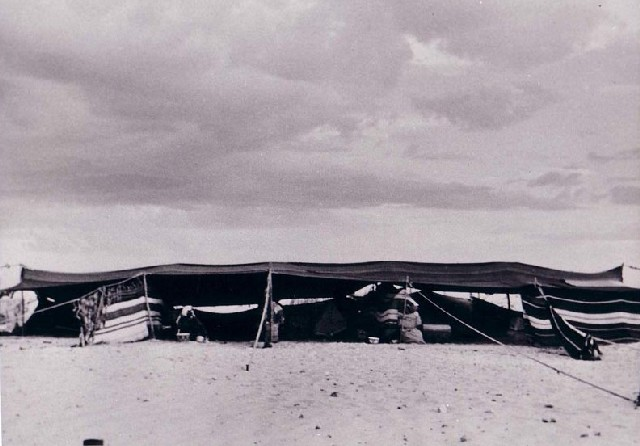
Bedouin tent in Rahat (Al-Hezeel), 1955

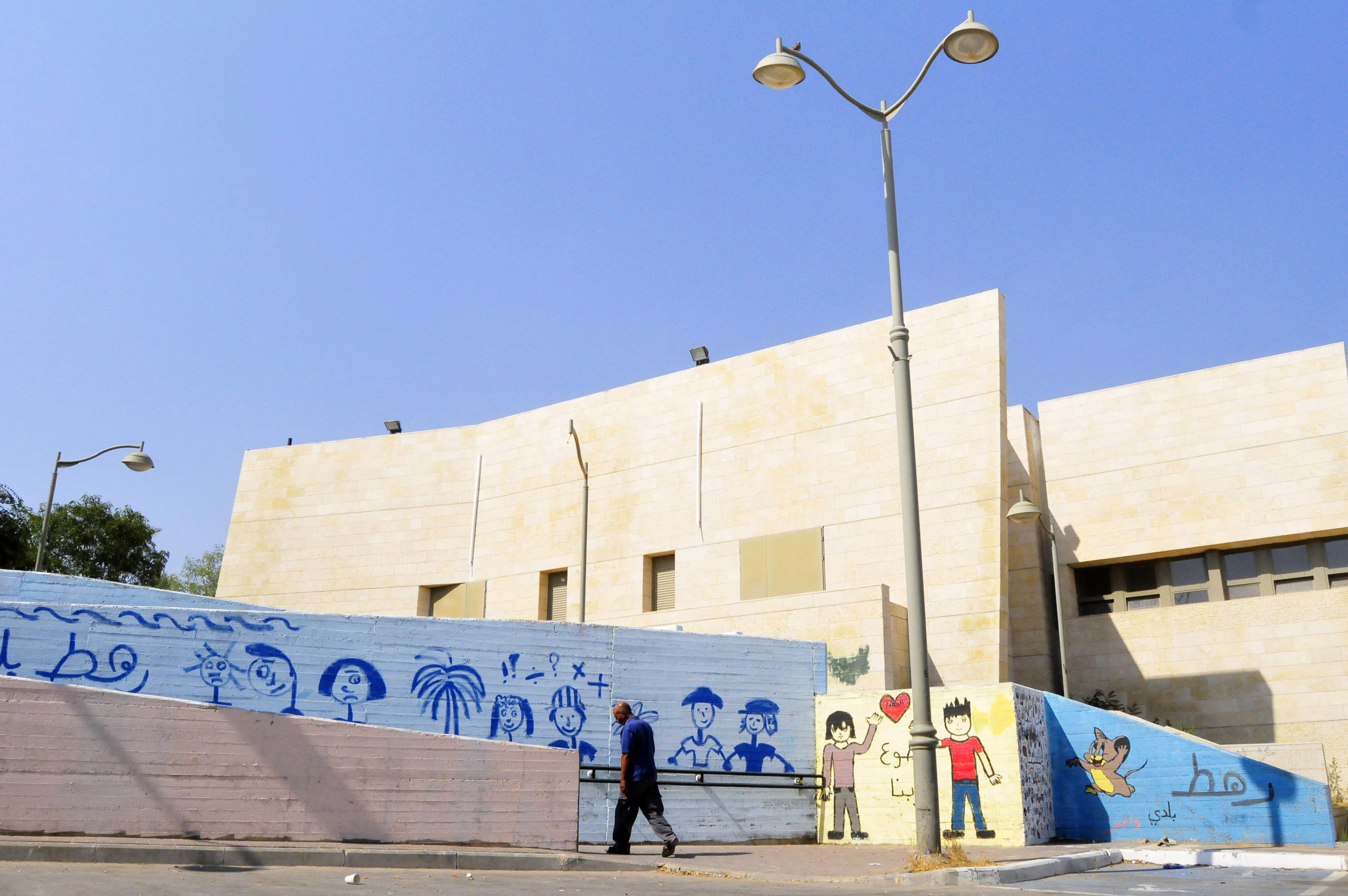
One of Rahat community centers

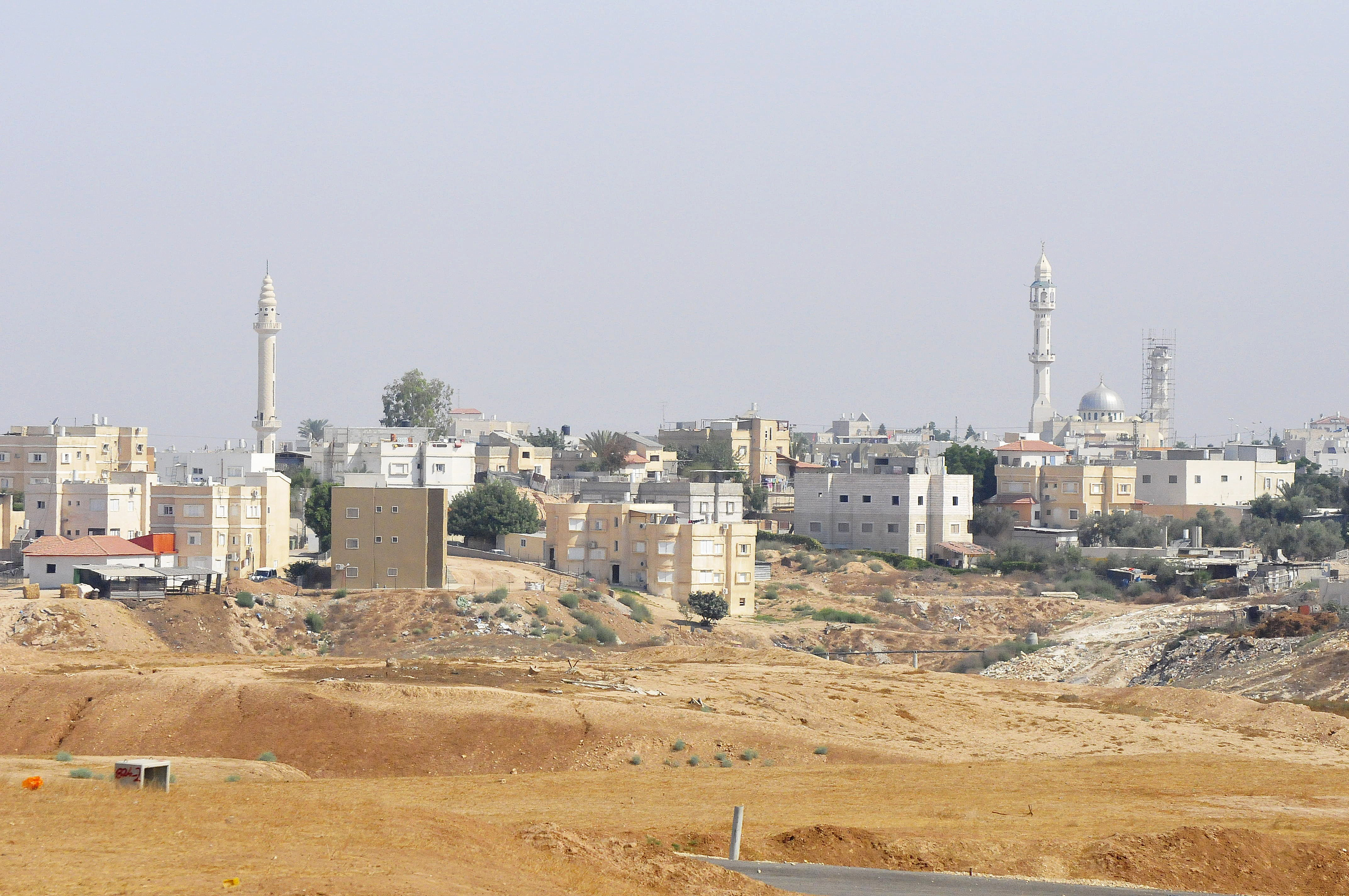

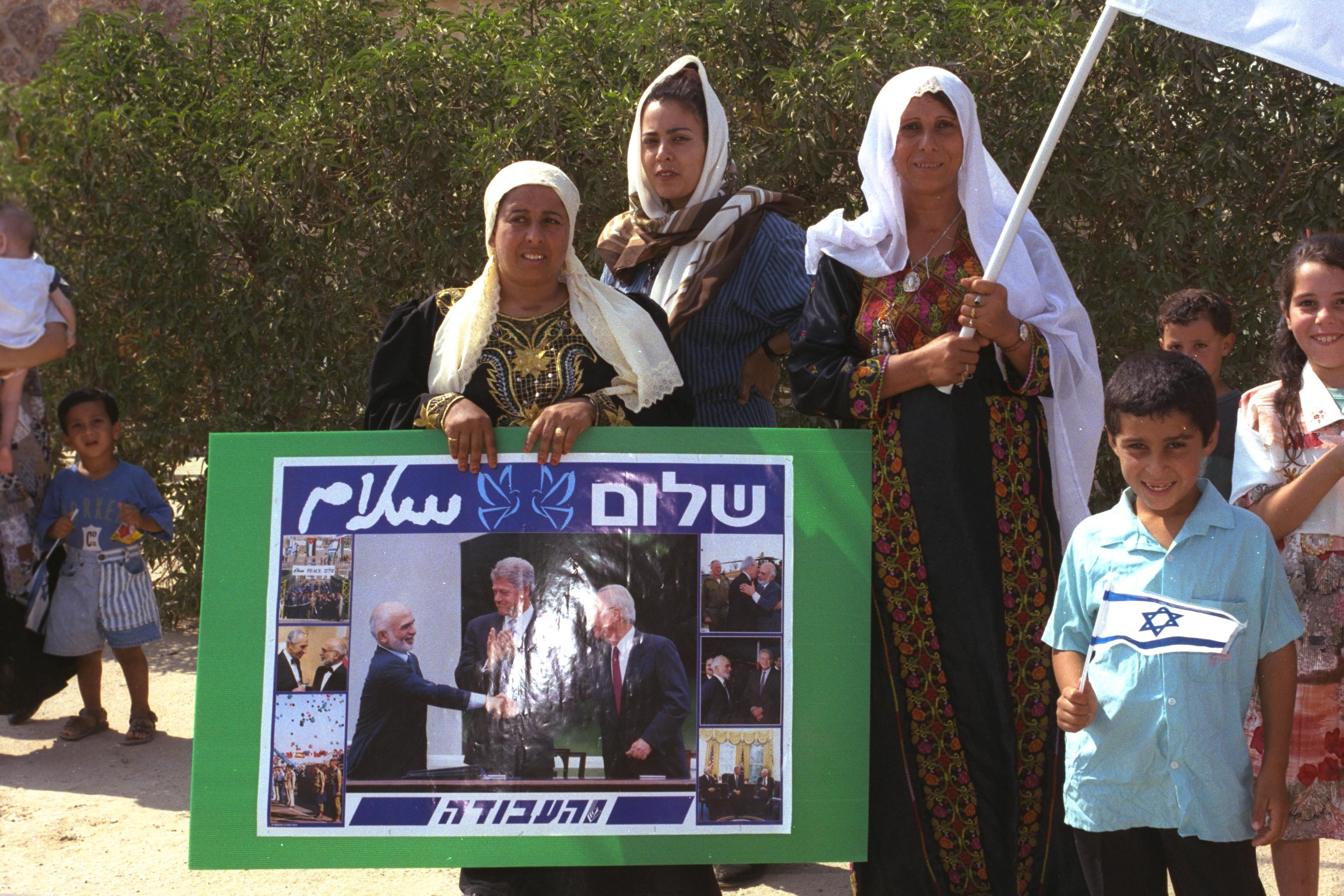
Bedouin women from Rahat hold up posters in favor of the Israeli-Arab peace process, 1995

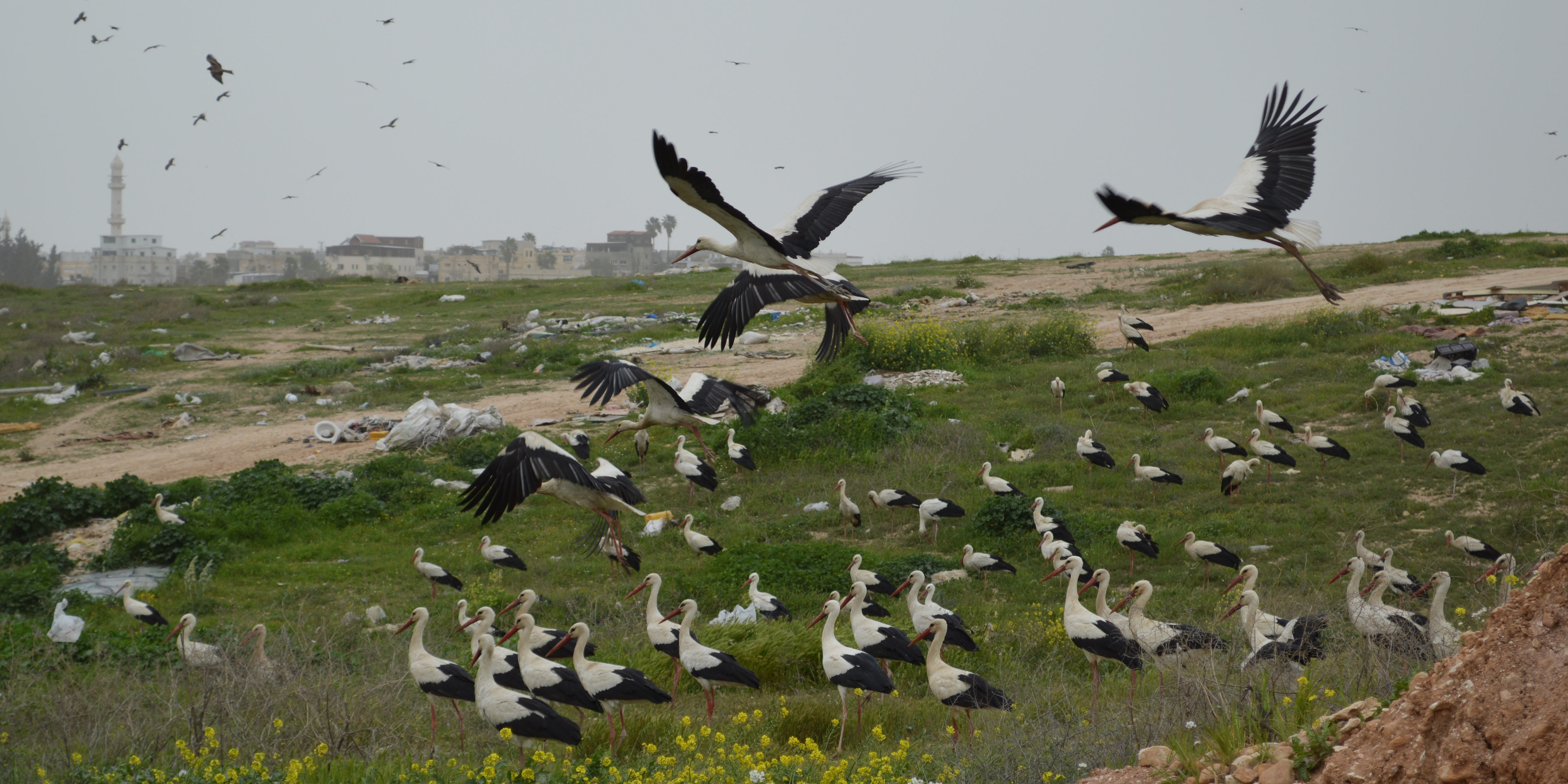
Migratory storks resting in Rahat, spring 2017

== See also ==
- Arab localities in Israel
- Negev Bedouin
- Sedentarization
- Bnei al-Salam Rahat F.C.
