= Gilby (surname) =

Gilby is a surname. Notable people with the surname include:

- Anthony Gilby (c.1510–1585), English clergyman
- Fred Gilby (1907–1991), Australian rules footballer
- Harry Gilby, English actor
- Helen Gilby (born 1974), British sprint canoer
- John Gilby (1900–1985), New Zealand rower
- William Gilby (1834–1905), English cricketer

== See also ==
- Gilby Engineering, motor racing team
