= William Gilby =

English cricketer

William Gilby (26 July 1834 – 19 March 1905) was an English first-class cricketer active 1872 who played for Middlesex. He was born in Leamington Priors; died in Wandsworth.
