= Lehavim =

Town in southern Israel

Lehavim לְהָבִים
- Local council
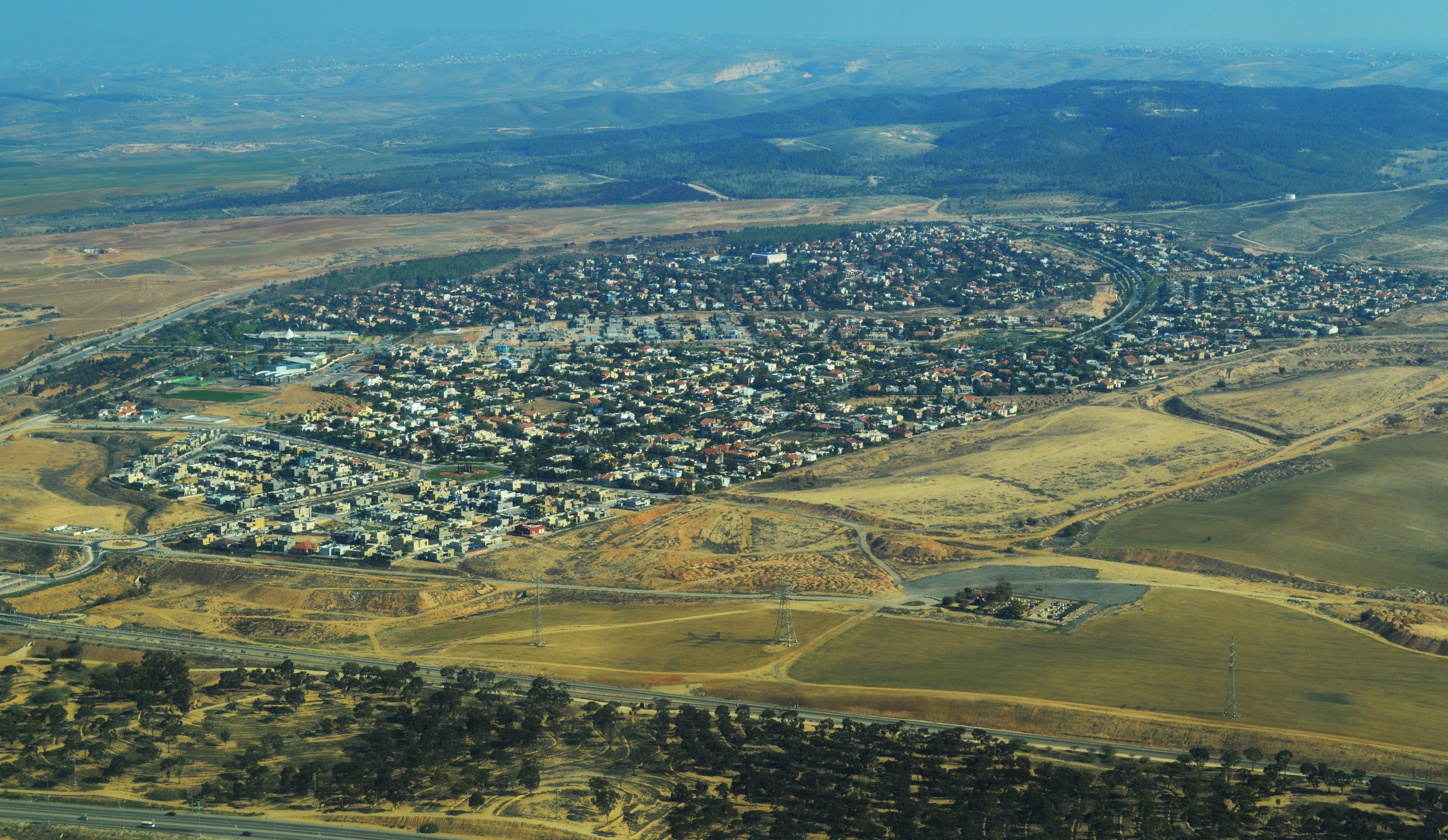

- Location within Northern Negev region of Israel Location within Israel
- Coordinates: 31°22′08″N 34°48′47″E
- Country: Israel
- District: Southern
- Subdistrict: Beersheba
- Natural Region: Be'er Sheva
- Founded: 1983

Government
  - Head of Municipality: Elad Arazi

Area
  - Total: 2,525 dunams (2.525 km^{2}; 0.975 sq mi)

Population (2024)
  - Total: 8,027
  - Density: 3,179/km^{2} (8,234/sq mi)

Lehavim (Hebrew: לְהָבִים) is an affluent hamlet in southern Israel. Founded in 1983 and located in the northern Negev around 15 km north of Beersheba, it has a local council government. In 2024 it had a population of 8,027.

== History ==
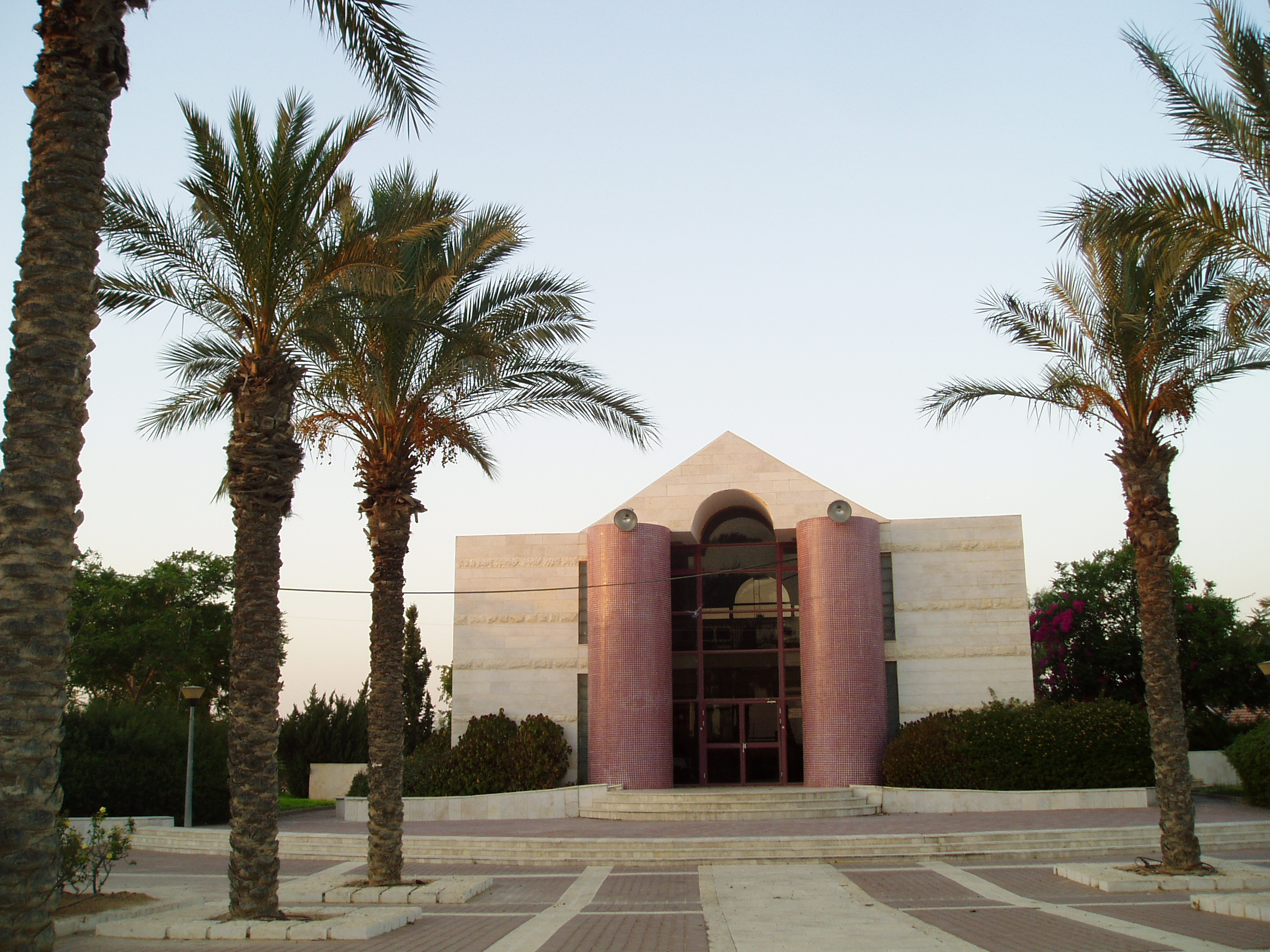
Lehavim synagogue

Lehavim, originally called "Givat Lahav," covers an area of 2,525 dunams (2.5 km^{2}). It is one of Beersheba's three satellite towns (the others are Omer and Meitar). Most of the inhabitants commute to Beersheba for work. Lehavim is an upper-middle class community of detached homes surrounded by palm trees and gardens. As of 2017, it received the highest ranking on the Israeli Socio-Economic Index (10 out of 10) according to the Israel Central Bureau of Statistics along with only three other municipalities (Omer, Kfar Shmaryahu and Savyon). The town has a library, a country club, kindergartens, a school, two synagogues, and a commercial center. Lehavim achieved municipal status in 1988.

== Transportation ==
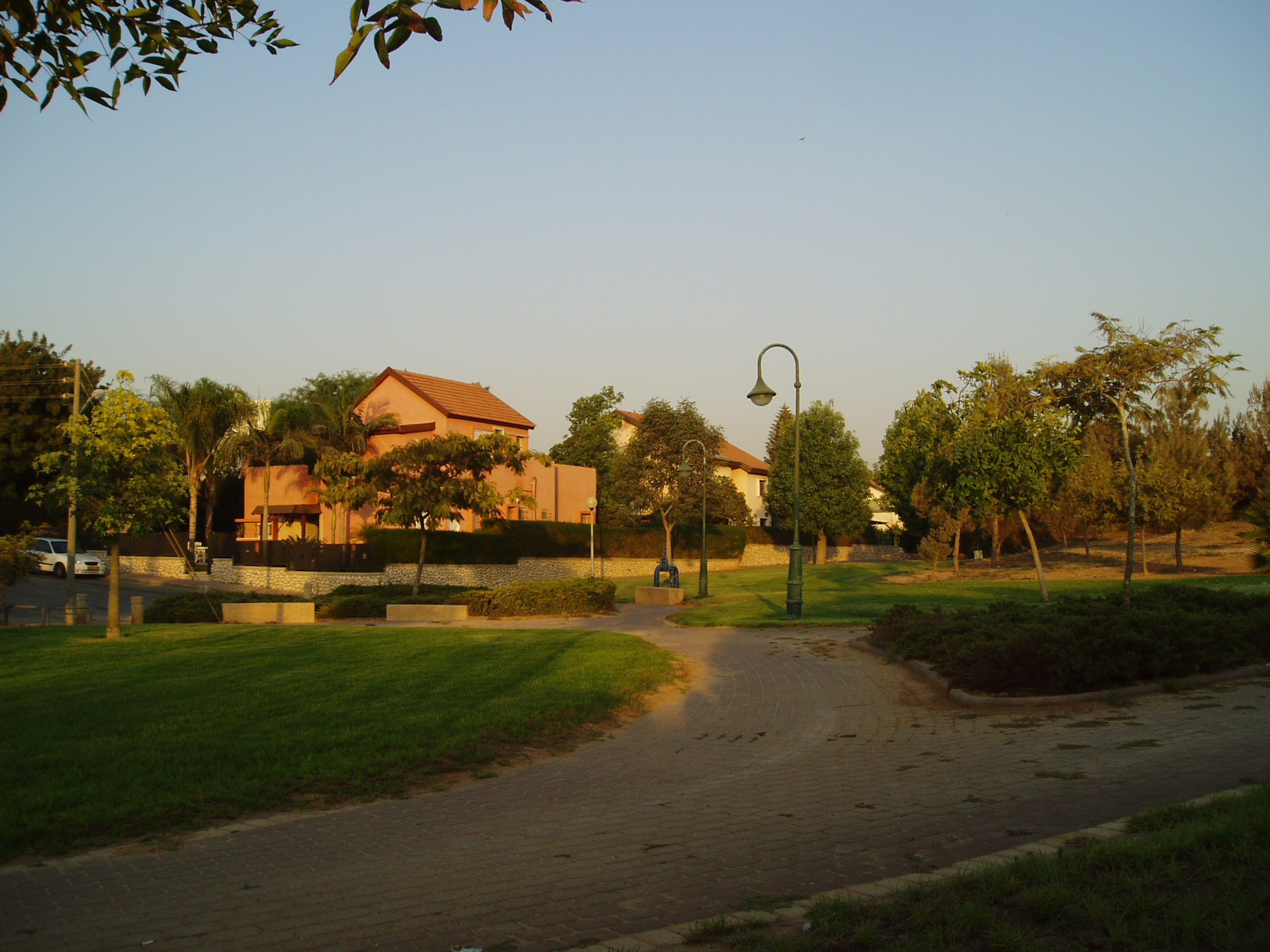
A public park in Lehavim

Lehavim is located near the intersection of Highway 40 (Beersheba–Tel Aviv) and Highway 31 (Arad–Rahat), known as the Lehavim Junction. The Lod–Beersheba railway line passes through this crossing. The Lehavim–Rahat railway station, inaugurated in 2007 on the western side of Lehavim, and its proximity to Highway 6, have served as an economic catalyst.

== Demographics ==
Historical population
Year	Pop.	±%
1995	2,500	—
2008	5,700	+128.0%
2022	7,686	+34.8%
2024	8,028	+4.4%

== Voting Patterns ==
In the 2022 election, 64 percent of voters in Lehavim voted for the parties of the center-left coalition led by Yair Lapid, while 32 percent voted for the parties of the right-wing coalition led by Benjamin Netanyahu and 2 percent voted for the Arab parties.

In the 2026 election, 65 percent of voters in Lehavim voted for the parties of the center-left coalition led by Gadi Eisenkot, while 25 percent voted for the parties of the right-wing coalition led by Benjamin Netanyahu and 4 percent voted for the Arab parties. An additional 3.1 percent voted for the Reservists, and 2.6 percent voted for Amcha Yisrael. Voter turnout increased 11 percent from the 2022 election.

== Notable residents ==
- Ron Darmon (born 1992), Olympic triathlete
