= Gilbey baronets =

Baronetcy in the Baronetage of the United Kingdom

Escutcheon of the Gilbey baronets of Elsenham Hall

The Gilbey Baronetcy, of Elsenham Hall in the County of Essex, is a title in the Baronetage of the United Kingdom. It was created on 4 September 1893 for the wine-merchant, stock-breeder, agriculturalist and philanthropist Walter Gilbey. He was chairman and co-founder of W. & A. Gilbey, wine merchants and distillers. The second Baronet was also Chairman of the family firm, as well as an influential figure in horse-breeding and sports.

== Gilbey baronets, of Elsenham Hall (1893) ==
- Sir Walter Gilbey, 1st Baronet (1831–1914)
- Sir (Henry) Walter Gilbey, 2nd Baronet (1859–1945)
- Sir (Walter) Derek Gilbey, 3rd Baronet (1913–1991)
- Sir (Walter) Gavin Gilbey, 4th Baronet (born 1949)

The heir presumptive is the current holder's kinsman (Walter) Anthony Gilbey (b. 1966).

Baronetage of the United Kingdom
Preceded by Cameron baronets	Gilbey baronets of Elsenham Hall; 4 September 1893	Succeeded by Lyell baronets
