= Walter Gilbey =

British wine-merchant and philanthropist (1831–1914)

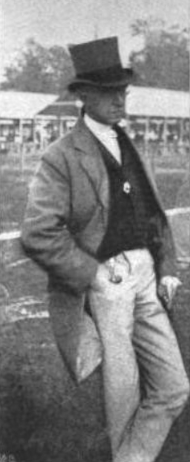
In The Sketch, 13 October 1897

Sir Walter Gilbey, 1st Baronet, DL, JP (2 May 1831 – 12 November 1914) was an English wine-merchant, horse-breeder, author, and philanthropist.

== Early life ==
Gilbey was born at 11, Windhill, Bishop's Stortford, Hertfordshire to Henry Gilbey (1789–1842) and Elizabeth (died 1869), a daughter of William Bailey, of Stansted Mountfichet, Essex. Henry Gilbey, of Essex farming stock, had gone into innkeeping at Stansted, becoming landlord of the Bell Inn, but after the economic depression resulting from the Napoleonic Wars he had to seek other employment. Settling at Bishop's Stortford, he established a successful daily coach service travelling to and from London, often driving himself. The arrival of the railway put an end to this business, and Henry returned to his former occupation as landlord of the Red Lion Inn at Hockerill. He died after only a short time, when Walter was eleven years old, leaving his widow and seven children with limited means. Walter Gilbey was shortly placed in the office of an estate agent at Tring, later obtaining a clerkship in a firm of parliamentary agents in London.

On the outbreak of the Crimean War, Walter and his younger brother Alfred (grandfather of the cleric Alfred Newman Gilbey) volunteered for civilian service at the front, and were employed at a convalescent hospital on the Dardanelles. Returning to London on the declaration of peace, the pair took the advice of their eldest brother Henry, a wholesale wine-merchant, and started in the retail wine and spirits trade. This included the local London style gin.

== Imported wine business ==
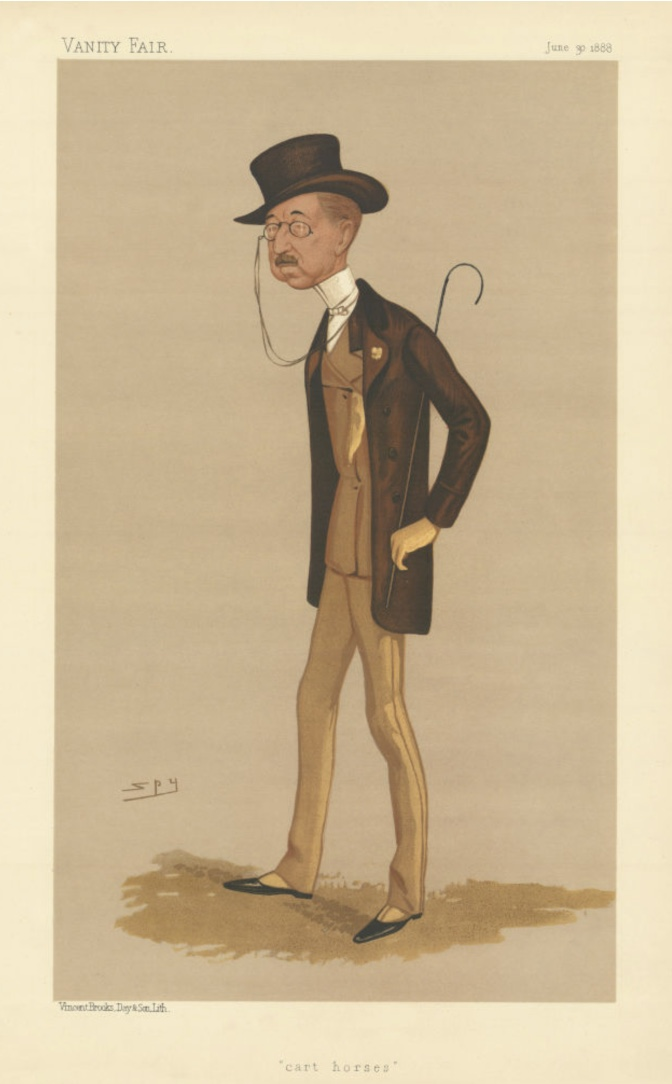
"Cart horses", caricature of Gilbey by Spy published in Vanity Fair, 1888

The heavy duty then levied by the British government on French, Portuguese and Spanish wines made them too costly for English middle classes, and especially lower middle classes, which could only afford beer. Henry Gilbey believed these classes would gladly drink wine if they could get it at a moderate price. On his advice Walter and Alfred determined to push the sales of colonial, and particularly of Cape, wines, on which the duty was comparatively light. Financially backed by Henry, they opened a small retail business in a basement in Oxford Street, London, in 1857.

== Growth and distribution ==
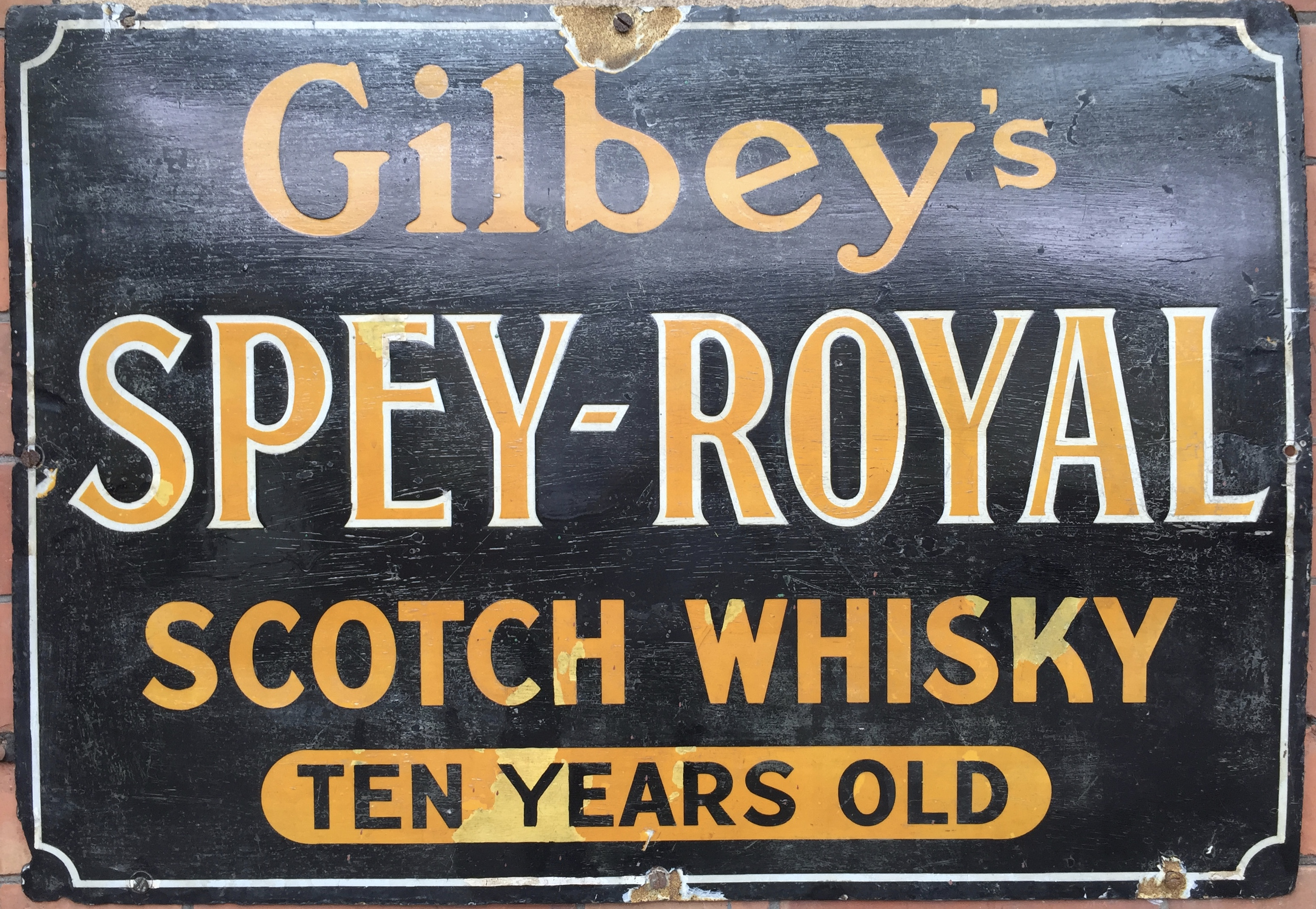
A sign for Spey-Royal Scotch Whisky at Loughborough Central railway station on the Great Central Railway (heritage railway)

The Cape wines proved popular, and within three years the brothers had 20,000 customers on their books. The creation of the off-licence system by William Ewart Gladstone, then Chancellor of the Exchequer, in 1860, followed by the large reduction in the duty on French wines effected by the commercial treaty between England and France in 1861, revolutionized their trade and laid the foundation of their fortunes.

Three provincial grocers, who had been granted the new off-licence, applied to be appointed the Gilbeys' agents in their respective districts, and many similar applications followed. These were granted, and before very long a leading local grocer was acting as the firm's agent in every district in England.

The grocer who dealt in the Gilbeys' wines and spirits was not allowed to sell those of any other firm, and the Gilbeys in return handed over to him all their existing customers in his district. This arrangement was of mutual advantage, and the Gilbeys' business increased so rapidly that, in 1864, Henry Gilbey abandoned his own undertaking to join his brothers. In 1867 the three brothers secured the old Pantheon theatre and concert hall in Oxford Street for their headquarters. In 1875, the firm purchased a large claret-producing estate in Medoc, on the banks of the Gironde, and became also the proprietors of two large whisky-distilleries in Scotland. In 1893 the business was converted, for family reasons, into a private limited liability company, of which Walter Gilbey, who in the same year was created a baronet, was chairman.

== Horse breeding and agriculture ==
Sir Walter Gilbey also became well known as a breeder of shire horses, and he did much to improve the breed of English horses (other than race-horses) generally, and wrote extensively on the subject, including the encyclopedic Animal Painters of England From the Year 1650: A brief history of their lives and works. He became president of the Shire Horse Society, of the Hackney Horse Society, and of the Hunters' Improvement Society, and he was the founder and chairman of the London Cart Horse Parade Society. He was also a practical agriculturist, and president of the Royal Agricultural Society. He was appointed a deputy lieutenant of Essex in 1906.

== Philanthropy ==
Gilbey paid for the first two of five almshouses, "King's Cottages", erected in the early 20th century in Bishop's Stortford. Other contributors to the project included Admiral Frederick Samuel Vander-Meulen, in memory of his brother Colonel John Harrison Vander-Muelen.

== Personal life ==
On 3 November 1858, Gilbey married Ellen Parish, fourth daughter of John Parish, of Bishop's Stortford. They were the parents of ten children:

- Charles Herbert Gilbey (1858–1876)
- Henry Walter Gilbey (1860–1945)
- Arthur Nockolds Gilbey (1861–1939)
- Tresham Gilbey (1862–1947)
- Sebastian Gilbey (1863–1880)
- Maud Ellen Gilbey (1865–1951)
- Mabel Kate Gilbey (1866–1945)
- Guy Gilbey (1868–1930)
- Rose Gilbey (1870, died young)
- Emily Lucy Gilbey (1872–1938)

Mrs Gilbey died on 16 November 1896. Gilbey was created a baronet on 4 September 1898. His son Henry Walter Gilbey succeeded him as the second baronet in 1914.

The wine critic Tom Gilbey, is a descendant of Walter Gilbey.

== Selected works ==
- The Great Horse, or The War Horse: from the time of the Roman Invasion till its development into the Shire Horse. (London: Vinton & Co.. 1899)
- Animal Painters of England From the Year 1650: A brief history of their lives and works (London: Vinton & Co., 1900)
- Ponies, Past and Present (London: Vinton & Co,. 1900)
- Early Carriages and Roads (London: Vinton & Co., 1903)
- Modern Carriages (London: Vinton & Co., 1905)
- George Morland: His life and works (London: Adam and Charles Black, 1907)

== See also ==
- SodaStream: the water-carbonating apparatus devised by a family member in 1903

Baronetage of the United Kingdom
New title	Baronet (of Elsenham Hall); 1893–1914	Succeeded by Henry Walter Gilbey
