= Department of Community, Culture and Leisure (Isle of Man) =

Department overview
- Formed: 1 April 2010
- Preceding Department: Department of Tourism and Leisure
- Dissolved: 1 April 2014
- Jurisdiction: Isle of Man
- Headquarters: Illiam Dhone House; 2 Circular Road; Douglas, Isle of Man
- Employees: 408
- Annual budget: £26m (2011-2012)
- Minister responsible: Chris Robertshaw MHK, Minister for Community, Culture and Leisure
- Department executive: Nick Black, Chief Executive Officer
- Website: www.gov.im/dccl

The Department of Community, Culture and Leisure (often abbreviated to DCCL) was one of nine departments of the Isle of Man Government. It was created on 1 April 2010 taking over the leisure functions from the former Department of Tourism and Leisure along with the community and culture functions from various other departments. It was dissolved on 1 April 2014.

== Functions ==
=== Community ===
- Public transport
  - Bus Vannin
  - Isle of Man Railway
  - Manx Electric Railway
- Recreational clubs

=== Culture ===
- Manx culture
- Arts
  - Management of the Villa Marina complex

=== Leisure ===
- Leisure
- Sports
  - Management of the National Sports Centre (NSC)
- Curraghs Wildlife Park

=== Non Governmental agencies reporting to the DCCL ===
- Arts Council
- Manx National Heritage
- Manx Heritage Foundation
- Office of Fair Trading
- Sports Council
- Swimming Pool Authorities

== Ministers for Community, Culture and Leisure ==
- David Cretney MHK, 2010–11
- Tim Crookall MHK, 2011–2012
- Graham Cregeen MHK, 2012-2014
- Chris Robertshaw MHK, 2014
