= Curraghs Wildlife Park =

Wildlife park in the Isle of Man

- An enclosure in the Curraghs Wildlife Park
- Interactive map of Curraghs Wildlife Park
- 54°19′05″N 4°30′49″W
- Location: The Curraghs, Isle of Man
- Land area: 26 acres (11 ha)
- Website: www.gov.im/wildlife

Designations

Ramsar Wetland
- Official name: Ballaugh Curragh
- Designated: 6 September 2006
- Reference no.: 1642

Curraghs Wildlife Park is a wildlife park in The Curraghs (also known as the Ballaugh Curraghs), an area of wetland in the north-west of the Isle of Man.

The park is owned by the Isle of Man Government and is administered by the Department of Environment, Food & Agriculture. It was formerly administered through the island's Department of Community, Culture and Leisure.

== History ==
The park was founded in 1963, under the Curraghs Acquisition Act 1963 (an Act of Tynwald). The Isle of Man Government purchased about 200 acres (81 ha) of land to be divided between 160 acres (65 ha) as a reserve and 40 acres (16 ha) as a wildlife park. The 26-acre (11 ha) park was formally opened by the Lieutenant Governor of the Isle of Man, Sir Ronald Garvey on 23 July 1965. It contains about 100 primarily wetland species from around the world in walk-through enclosures.

15 acres (6 ha) of the park remains undeveloped and displays a variety of habitats such as bogs, Molinia grasslands, open water peat diggings, birch woodland and hay meadows. Nature trails run through this area with signage describing the ecology and history, comprising a nature trail, tree top trail and butterfly trail.

In 2005, as part of the park's 40th-anniversary celebrations, it was host to the annual meeting of the British and Irish Association of Zoos and Aquariums (BIAZA). In 2009 the park received the Small Collection award for "Best Education Project with schools" from BIAZA at a ceremony held at Knowsley Hall, Merseyside, in recognition of the park's work in education.

The Curragh is designated as a "wetland site of international importance" under the Convention for Wetlands of International Significance, known as the Ramsar Convention.

== Incidents ==
After an escape of Red-necked Wallabies from the park in the 1960s, the species has widely established itself ferally all across the island.

In 1992 a sea lion named Orry was born at the Park. In 1994 he was sold to a dealer who sold him to a travelling circus in Belgium. He was rescued and given to Dudley Zoo, where he died in 2014. The incident resulted in an unsuccessful motion of no confidence in the then Minister for Agriculture, Fisheries & Forestry John Corrin MHK.

Around 1995 Red-winged Laughingthrush, a species of bird from China and Vietnam escaped from the park and established a nearby feral population, which was confirmed as breeding in the wild in 1996. The population died out after several years.

In April 2018, two lemurs were killed when a fire destroyed their enclosure.

In October 2019, a red panda named Kush escaped from the park and was missing for almost three weeks. Kush escaped again in January 2020 for around a week.

== Education and facilities ==
There are educational facilities in the park, together with a children's farm (Close Beg) with domestic animals, play areas and The Orchid Line miniature railway.

== Animals ==
Animals at Curraghs Wildlife Park include:

- Boa constrictors
- Bolivian squirrel monkeys
- Black spider monkeys
- Chilean flamingos
- Emus
- Fishing cats
- Hermann's tortoises
- European eagle owls
- Humboldt penguins
- Kookaburras
- Long-eared owls
- Northern lynxes
- Red pandas
- Ring-tailed coatis
- Silvery Gibbon
- Oriental small-clawed otters
- Red-necked wallabies
