= Kush (red panda) =

Red panda

- Other name: Krafty Kush
- Species: Red panda
- Sex: Male
- Born: June 2013; Highland Wildlife Park, Kingussie, Scotland
- Died: 1 December 2021; Curraghs Wildlife Park, Isle of Man
- Cause of death: Not yet known
- Known for: Escaping his enclosure on multiple occasions
- Residence: Curraghs Wildlife Park, Isle of Man
- Parents: Kitty and Kevyn
- Mate: Sara
- Offspring: Kamal, Aria, Jinshar, Millish

Kush was a male red panda known for repeatedly escaping his enclosure at Curraghs Wildlife Park, Isle of Man.

== Early life ==
Kush was born in June 2013 at Highland Wildlife Park in Kingussie, Scotland, to Kitty and Kevyn. He was the first red panda cub to be born at the park and the first to be born in one of the Royal Zoological Society of Scotland's animal collections in 13 years.

In early 2014, Kush was moved to Curraghs Wildlife Park in the Isle of Man, where he lived until his death.

== Escapes ==
Kush is widely known throughout the Isle of Man for having escaped the wildlife park on multiple occasions.

His first escape, in 2019, was facilitated by a fallen tree in his enclosure, which formed a bridge by which he could leave. He managed to evade his keepers for weeks before being recaptured. He escaped once more in 2020.

== Death ==
On 30 October 2021, Kush experienced a sudden loss of co-ordination and was put under anaesthesia for investigation. Blood samples were taken and the anaesthetic was reversed, but his condition worsened. Despite nursing efforts by his keepers and further medical interventions the next day, it became clear that Kush was not going to survive, and so was euthanised.

Red pandas typically have a lifespan of between eight and ten years, but have been known to live up to 15 years in captivity. Kush was considered by his keepers to be "still in his prime" and—as of 20 December 2021—the cause of his rapid decline in health is unknown.
