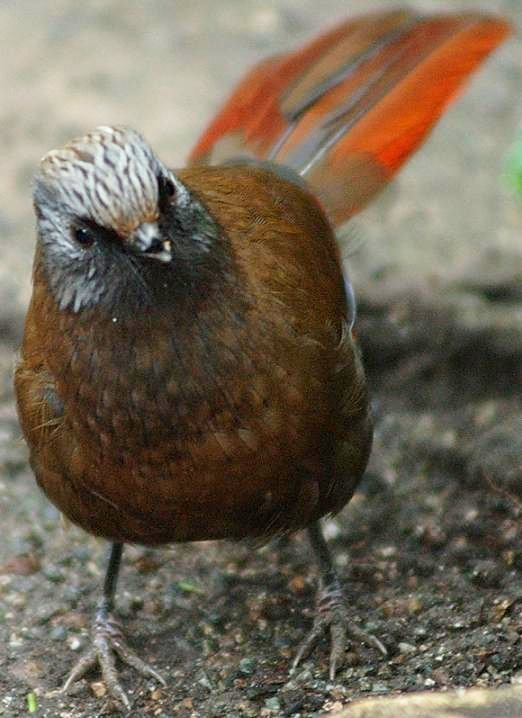

Conservation status
- Least Concern (IUCN 3.1)

Scientific classification
- Kingdom: Animalia
- Phylum: Chordata
- Class: Aves
- Order: Passeriformes
- Family: Leiothrichidae
- Genus: Trochalopteron
- Species: T. formosum

Binomial name
- Trochalopteron formosum Verreaux, 1869

Synonyms
- Garrulax formosus

= Red-winged laughingthrush =

Species of bird

The red-winged laughingthrush (Trochalopteron formosum) is a bird species in the family Leiothrichidae.

The plumage is mostly brown with large areas of red in the wings and tail. The crown and ear-coverts are grey with dark streaks and the throat is dark. The bill and feet are blackish. It has a loud, whistling song and is 27 to 28 centimetres (11 inches) long. The red-tailed laughingthrush is similar but has a rufous crown and greyer back and breast.

It is found in south-west China (Sichuan, Yunnan and Guangxi provinces) and north-west Vietnam. It inhabits forest, secondary growth, scrub and bamboo from 900 to 3,000 metres (2,950 to 9,840 ft) above sea level. It is an elusive bird which travels in pairs or small groups in dense cover near the forest floor. Little is known about its reproductive habits but in China breeding takes place during June and July.

== Introductions ==
Ten individuals of the species were imported to the Isle of Man in 1990 and held in captivity at the Curraghs Wildlife Park. Nearby records of escaped birds living in the wild began from 1995. In 1996 breeding in the wild was confirmed. By 1998 all of the original ten captive birds had either died or escaped. The last published records of birds in the wild was in July 2005. It is presumed that the small population persisted for sometime after; however, it is believed that the population has since died out (2017).
