= Esther Nelson =

Manx poet (1810–1843)

Esther Nelson (1810–1843) was a Manx poet best remembered for her book, Island Minstrelsy.

She was born in 1810 and baptised in Jurby on 6 June. She was the daughter of John Nelson, a vicar in three Manx parish churches: Jurby (1803–1818), Santon (1818–1830) and Bride (1830–1847). In 1838 she lived in Douglas but had returned to the family home at the rectory at Bride by the following year, when she wrote the dedication of her book of poems, Island Minstrelsy at the age of 29: 'To her island home, the authoress affectionately dedicates the first and simple effusions of an island heart.' In 1841 Nelson took a trip to Paris, apparently for health reasons, but she returned to the Isle of Man where she died of tuberculosis on Tuesday 21 March 1843, at the age of 33, in her family home at the rectory at Bride.

Nelson was a well-respected poet during her lifetime, often writing under the pen names "The Island Minstrel" or "Hadassah", the latter of which was given to her by G. H. Wood, a gentleman poet notable for having helped guard Napoleon on Saint Helena. Nelson's work continued to be highly regarded after her death, most notably by the Manx national poet, T. E. Brown, who wrote that:

We should not forget that true woman of genius. Hester Nelson. Often I think of her, and her early doom; and Bride seems to me a shrine of splendid promise and aspirations unfulfilled save in God... My father thought very highly of her poems. Some he thought worthy of Milton. And that was all breathed in and bred from your Bride hills, and the long stretches of the Ayre.

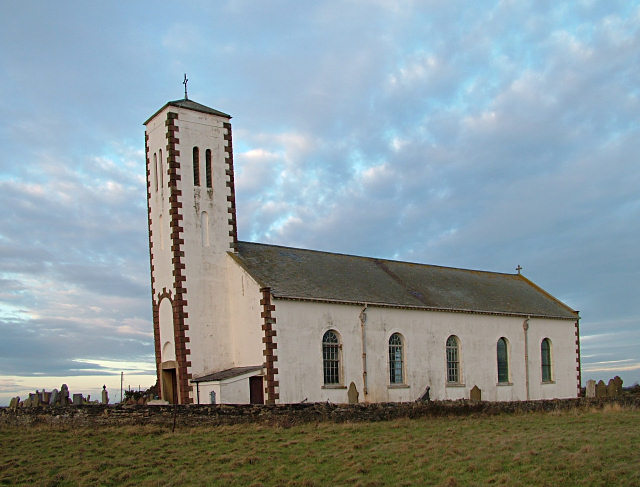
Jurby Church

The poems of Island Minstrelsey have been described as ranging "from long narrative poems of revenge, murder and heart-break, to short contemplations of mortality, the passage of time and the fragility of happiness. They poems circle around the central idea of the inevitability of the loss of happiness and innocence in the onslaught of 'that grim spoiler, Time'." This side to her work shows in the book's recurring concern with death, as is demonstrated with titles such as 'The Suicide', 'My Brother's Grave', 'The Dying Girl' and 'To the Dead'. Her most well-renowned poem is 'The Carrasdhoo Men', which told the story of a legendary group of Manx bandits. Her poetry also displays a great Manx patriotism, often heightened through her selection of historical themes. The following example comes from 'Song of the Absent', which featured in William Cubbon's 1913 book, A Book of Manx Poetry:

Isle of my heart,
Mona! the lone! the wild! the unforgot!
My home! thou art
The star, the idol of a wayward lot --
Earth cannot bring
One dearer vision to me than thy face,
Time cannot bring
Forgetfulness! affection mocks at space.
