= John Lewin (disambiguation) =

John Lewin (1770–1819) was an English-born artist active in Australia.

John Lewin may also refer to:

- John Lewin (Manx author), 19th-century author
- Jack Lewin (John Philip Lewin, 1915–1990), New Zealand public servant, unionist and lawyer

== See also ==
- Jonathan Levin (disambiguation)
