= Pasages =

Canadian and British minesweeper (1917–1931)

Coordinates: 54°35′N 04°55′W

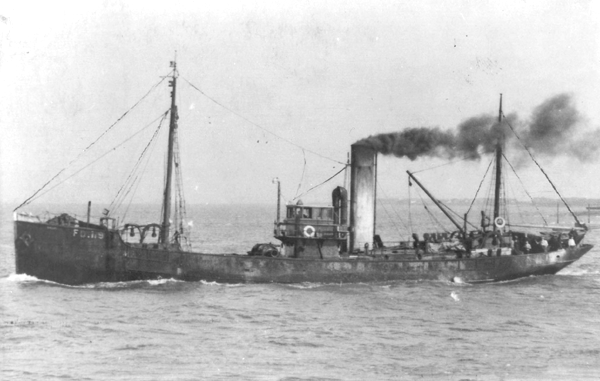
- Steam trawler Pasages

History

Canada
- Name: TR 14
- Ordered: February 1917
- Builder: Thor Iron Works, Toronto
- Yard number: 60
- Laid down: 1917
- Launched: 10 June 1918
- Out of service: laid up 7 January 1919
- Fate: Sold, 1921
- Name: Pasages
- Owner: Boston Deep Sea Fishing and Ice Company, Grimsby
- Operator: Boston Deep Sea Fishing and Ice Company, Grimsby
- Port of registry: Fleetwood, (United Kingdom)
- In service: 1926
- Identification: 148221
- Fate: Wrecked at Jurby Head, Isle of Man, December 1931
- Notes: Fleetwood registry closed on 31 August 1932. Vessel written off as total loss.

General characteristics as Pasages
- Type: Deep sea fishing trawler
- Tonnage: 271 GRT
- Length: 125 ft (38.1 m)
- Beam: 23 ft (7.0 m)
- Installed power: 480 ihp (358 kW)
- Speed: Approximately 10 knots (19 km/h; 12 mph)
- Crew: 13

ST Pasages (FD 119) was originally a Canadian "Castle" – TR series minesweeping trawler built by the Dominion Shipbuilding Company, Toronto, in 1917 for service with the Royal Canadian Navy during World War I as TR 14. Following the war the vessel was taken to the United Kingdom and converted to a fishing trawler in the 1920s. Renamed Pasages, the vessel ran aground in 1931 on the Isle of Man. The vessel was wrecked and her remains can still be seen.

== Description ==
The TR series of minesweeping naval trawler were copies of the Royal Navy's Castle class. There were some minor changes in the Canadian version, including the gun being mounted further forward and a different lighting system. The TR series had a displacement of 275 long tons (279 t) with a length overall of 133 feet 10 inches (40.8 m) and a length between perpendiculars of 125 feet 0 inches (38.1 m), a beam of 23 feet 5 inches (7.1 m) and a draught of 13 feet 5 inches (4.1 m). The vessels were powered by a steam triple expansion engine driving one shaft creating 480 indicated horsepower (358 kW). They had a maximum speed of 10 knots (19 km/h; 12 mph) and were armed with one QF 12-pounder 12 cwt naval gun mounted forward. (Note: "Cwt" is the abbreviation for hundredweight, 12 cwt referring to the weight of the gun. QF stands for quick-firing gun.)

== Service life ==
In February 1917, the British Admiralty ordered the construction of 36 naval trawlers from Canadian shipyards as part of a building programme intended to improve the state of seaward defence in Canadian waters. Named TR 14, the vessel was ordered from Thor Iron Works of Toronto, Ontario and was launched on 10 June 1918. The trawler was then sent up the Saint Lawrence River to Quebec City to be completed and commissioned. The trawler was intended for minesweeping duties, but was also used as a patrol and coastal convoy escort vessel along the shipping lanes on the East Coast of Canada.

Following the end of the war, TR 14 was paid off and laid up. In 1921 together with other vessels of the class TR 14 was brought to the United Kingdom and laid up at the Muirtown Basin, Caledonian Canal, Inverness, to await conversion and sale. In August 1926 TR 14 was bought by the Boston Deep Sea Fishing and Ice Company, Grimsby, registered in Fleetwood, United Kingdom, and renamed Pasages. Before entering service with the company she had a load line assigned to allow cargoes of herring to be carried and was assigned the designator FD 119. Pasages was managed by Basil Parks of Fleetwood.

== Wreck ==
On 3 December 1931, under the command of her skipper William James, whilst making passage back to Fleetwood from fishing grounds off the northwest coast of Ireland, Pasages encountered a severe south-westerly gale with associated sleet and rain as she transited the North Channel. James was an experienced mariner and had been in command of several trawlers for a period of sixteen years.

At 06:00hrs, in pitch darkness, Pasages grounded on the beach below St. Patrick's Church, Jurby on the northwest coast of the Isle of Man. Her skipper immediately tried to back the vessel off the sand, however the vessel would not respond and began to be swept by the wind and spray which in turn caused her to be buffeted by the swell resulting in damage to the vessel.

Given the plight affecting Pasages, her skipper decided to send up distress flares which were in turn seen in Ramsey resulting in District Officer Lace, of His Majesty's Coastguard, initiating the rescue attempt. Lace ordered the rocket signal to be fired, and soon the Ramsey Rocket Corps had assembled and made their way to Jurby. In addition the distress signals had also been seen in Peel, resulting in the Peel Rocket Corps also making their way to the scene. At 08:20hrs, whilst the Rocket Corps' were on their way the Ramsey Lifeboat, Lady Harrison, was launched in order to aid the rescue. At 08:30hrs the Peel Lifeboat was also launched.

The Ramsey Rocket Corps encountered difficulty in getting to the headland, requiring them to cross several water-logged fields with their apparatus. On reaching the site of the wreck one of the Pasages's crew, Norman Platt, jumped into the sea and swam ashore with a line thereby alleviating the Rocket Corps from having to fire a line to the vessel. The Rocket Corps then managed to secure the line and brought the remainder of the crew off Pasages by means of a breeches buoy. As the rescue was being carried out, both lifeboats remained on station. Due to the sea state following the rescue the Peel Lifeboat was unable to return home and subsequently diverted to Ramsey.

Following the grounding of Pasages, due to continued adverse weather, the wreck was unable to be salvaged. On 31 August 1932, the vessel's registry was closed. As of 2026 various portions of the wreck remain and are accessible during low tide periods.

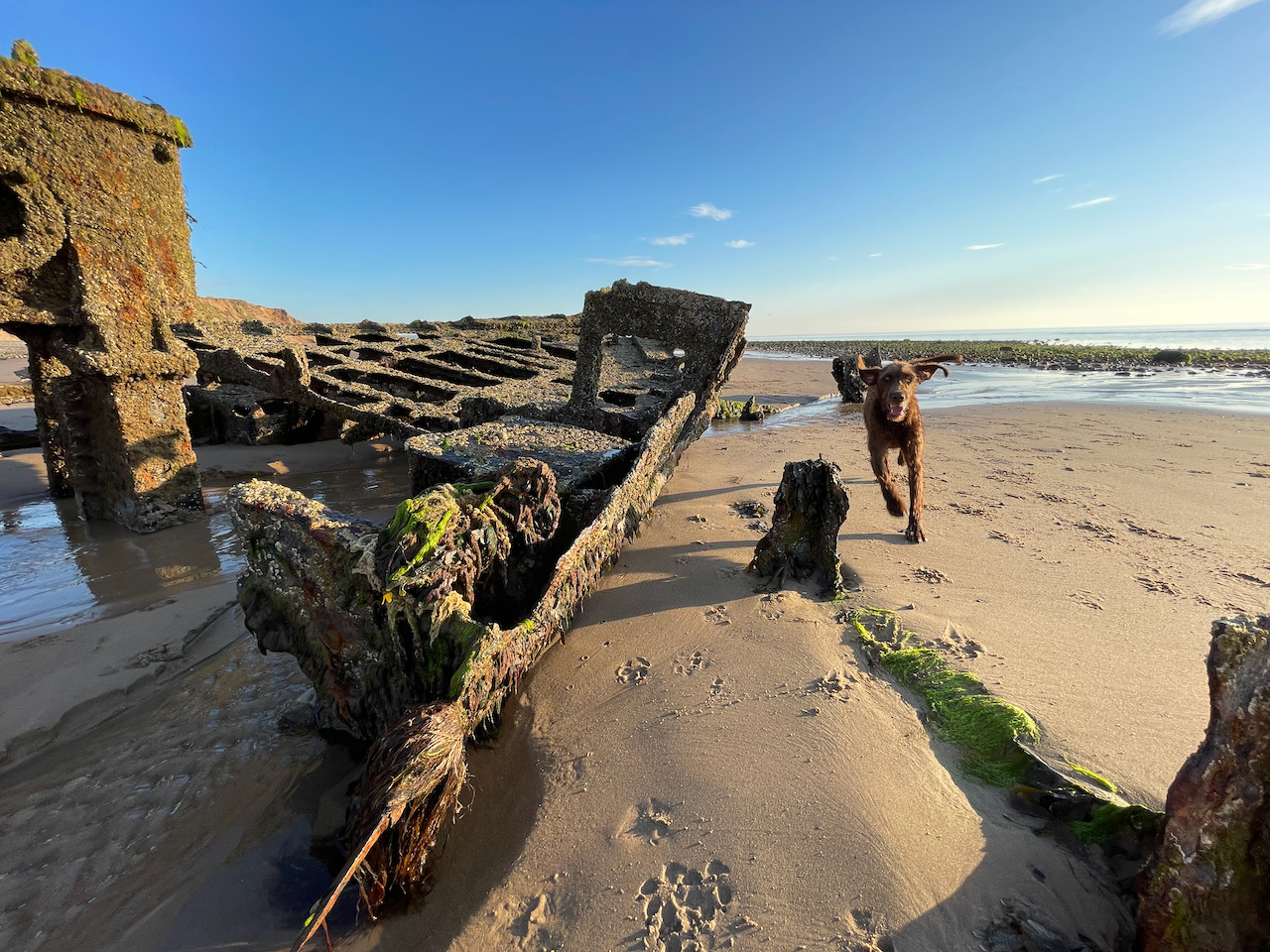
Wreck of ST Pasages, Jurby Head, Isle of Man, 2024

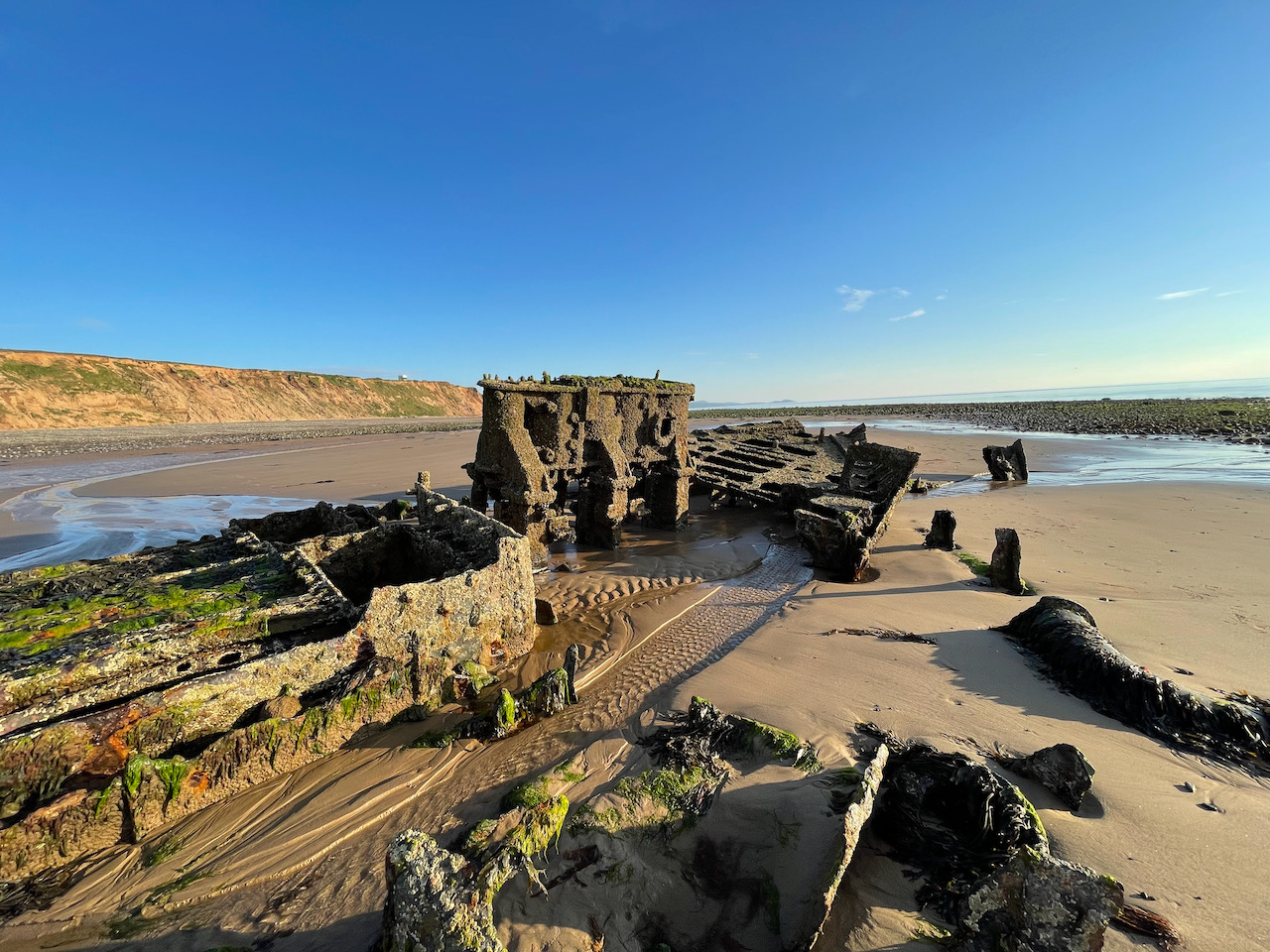
Wreck of ST Pasages, Jurby Head, Isle of Man, 2024

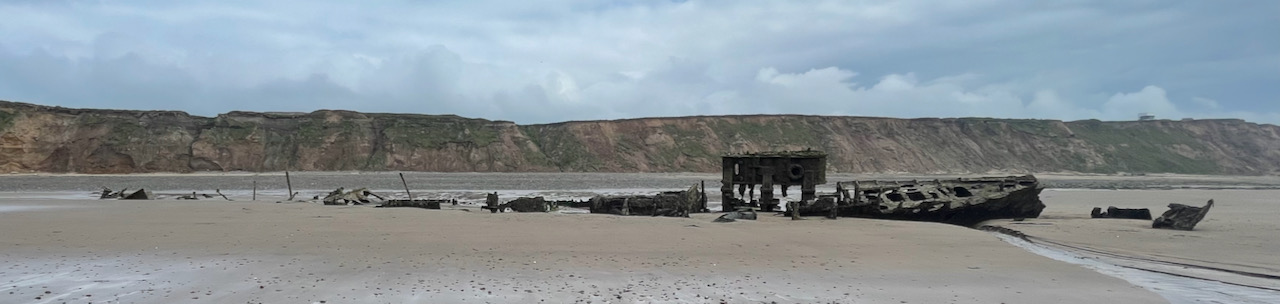
Wreck of ST Pasages, Jurby Head, Isle of Man, 2024
