= Percy Noble (Royal Navy officer) =

Royal Navy Admiral (1880-1955)

Admiral Sir Percy Noble GBE KCB CVO
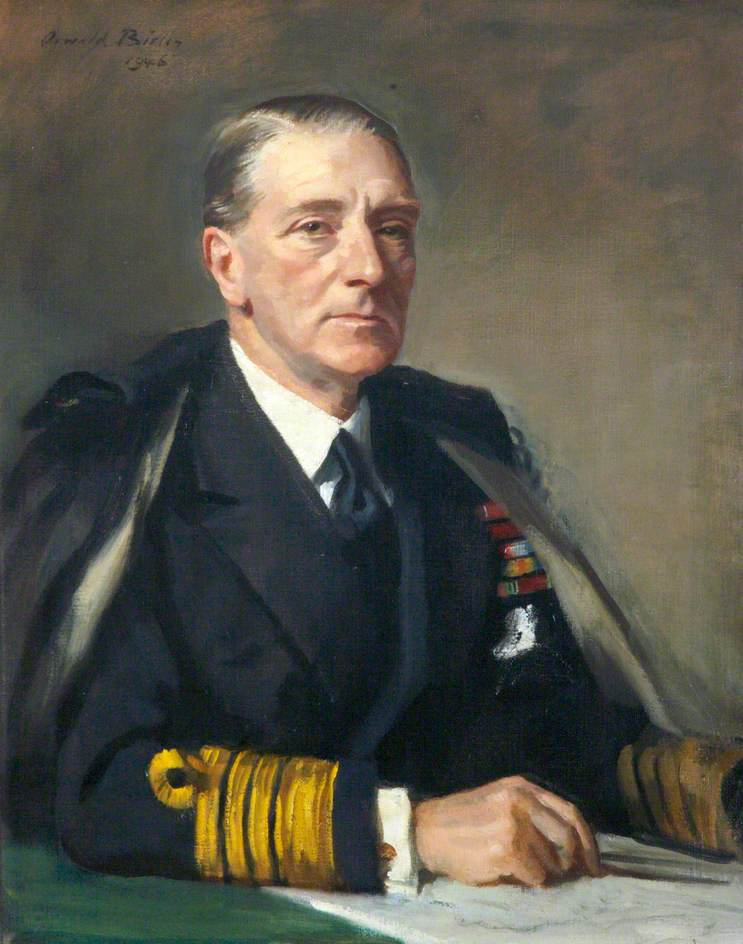
- Sir Percy Noble in 1946, by Oswald Birley
- Born: Percy Lockhart Harnam Noble; 16 January 1880; Bengal, India
- Died: 25 July 1955 (aged 75); London, UK
- Relatives: Colonel Charles Noble (father); Sir Allan Noble MP (son)
- Military career
- Allegiance: United Kingdom
- Branch: Royal Navy
- Service years: 1894–1945
- Rank: Admiral
- Commands: HMS Calliope (1918); HMS Calcutta & Flag Captain; HMS Barham & Flag Captain (1922–1924); HMS Ganges Training Establishment & Captain-in-Charge, Harwich (1925–1927); HMS St Vincent Cadet Training Establishment, CO (1927–1928); RN Director of Operations Division (1928–1930); 2nd Cruiser Squadron (1932–1934); Lord Commissioner of the Admiralty & Fourth Sea Lord (1935–1937); Commander-in-Chief, China Station (1937–1940); Commander-in-Chief, Western Approaches (1941–1942); Head of British Naval Delegation to Washington DC (1942–1944)
- Conflicts: World War I Battle of Jutland; World War II Battle of the Atlantic
- Awards: GBE (1944); KCB (1936); CVO (1920)

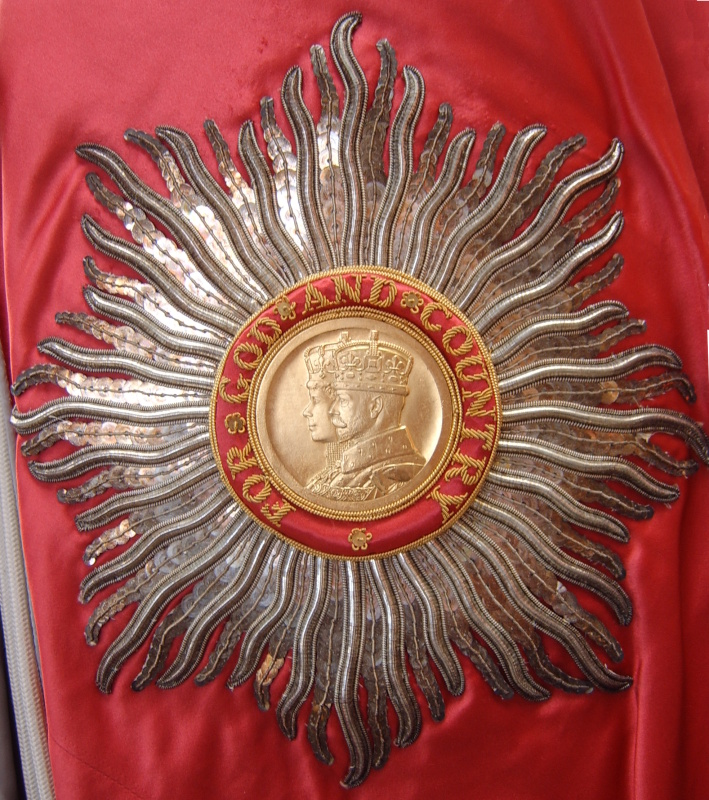
GBE breast star

Admiral Sir Percy Lockhart Harnam Noble (16 January 1880 – 25 July 1955) was a Royal Navy officer who served in both World Wars.

Noble rose to the rank of admiral and was Commander-in-Chief, Western Approaches for two crucial years during the Second World War, before being posted to the United States as Head of the RN Admiralty Delegation.

== Naval career ==
The son of an Indian Army officer, Colonel Charles Noble and Anne née Hay, he was educated at Edinburgh Academy, before being commissioned in the Royal Navy on 15 January 1894.

Promoted as lieutenant on 1 April 1902, Noble was posted to the battleship HMS Hannibal serving in the Channel Fleet. He transferred to HMS Russell on her commission in February 1903. He served in the Grand Fleet during the First World War. From 1918 to 1925 he commanded the cruisers HMS Calliope and HMS Calcutta and then the battleship HMS Barham before being appointed Senior Naval Officer, Harwich in 1925. He then commanded HMS St Vincent based at Forton, Gosport from 1927. He was appointed Director of Operations Division at the Admiralty in 1928. He was then Director of Naval Equipment from 1931 before returning to sea in command of the 2nd Cruiser Squadron in 1932. He then returned to the Admiralty as Fourth Sea Lord in 1935, before returning as Commander-in-Chief, China Station in 1938.

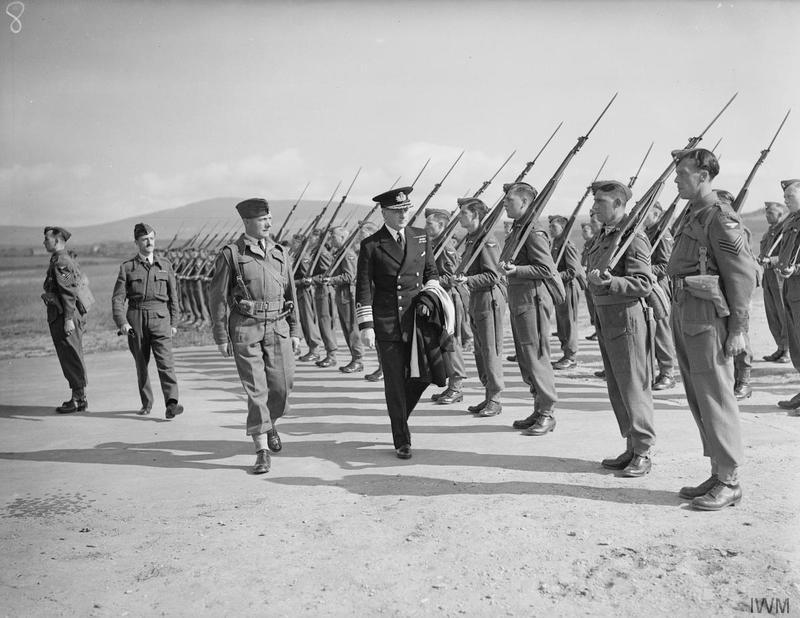
Sir Percy Noble inspects members of 2778 Squadron RAF Regiment at RAF Jurby in 1942.

On his return to London, Admiral Noble was appointed Commander-in-Chief, Western Approaches, headquartered at Derby House, Liverpool, from February 1941 to November 1942. His work in reorganising escort groups, and revamping escort training methods are widely regarded as having been crucial foundational elements of the eventual success of the Allied navies in the Atlantic theatre. Noble was remembered by those who worked with him at Derby House as an easy-going commander, and an agreeable person to work with. Always conciliatory, Noble was an expert at building consensus around his chosen courses of action. Noble was, although not forced, certainly pushed out of Western Approaches to make room for Admiral Sir Max Horton, whose combative personality and experience in the submarine service made him the ideal candidate in the eyes of some to take the war to the U-boats.

He succeeded Admiral Sir Andrew Cunningham as Head of the British Naval Delegation to Washington DC in 1942, before retiring from active naval service in 1945. By way of recognition, Noble was granted the title of Rear-Admiral of the United Kingdom (an honorary appointment) on 19 June 1945.

== Family ==
Noble married, in 1907, Diamantina Isabella, only daughter of Allan Campbell. She died in 1909, having one son (qv. Sir Allan Noble MP). He married secondly, in 1913, Celia Emily (later Lady Noble), daughter of Robert Kirkman Hodgson DL and Lady Norah née Boyle, having another son, Charles Noble.

A memorial to Admiral Sir Percy Noble was placed in the north choir aisle of Liverpool Cathedral in 1957.

== Honours and awards ==
- Knight Grand Cross of the Order of the British Empire 1944
- Knight Commander of the Order of the Bath 1936 (CB 1932)
- Commander of the Royal Victorian Order 1920 (MVO 1901)
- Commander, Legion of Merit (United States) 1946
- Grand Cross of the Royal Norwegian Order of St Olav 1948
- Grand Officer of the Legion of Honour (France) 1948
- Grand Cross of the Order of the Dannebrog (Denmark) 1948
- Rear-Admiral of the United Kingdom 1945
  - Hon. LLDs from Liverpool and Belfast Universities

Military offices
| Preceded by Sir Geoffrey Blake | Fourth Sea Lord; 1935–1937 | Succeeded by Sir Geoffrey Arbuthnot |
| Preceded by Sir Charles Little | Commander-in-Chief, China Station; 1938–1940 | Succeeded by Sir Geoffrey Layton |
Honorary titles
| Preceded by Sir Dudley Pound | First and Principal Naval Aide-de-Camp; 1943–1945 | Succeeded by The Lord Tovey |
| Preceded by Sir Hubert Brand | Rear-Admiral of the United Kingdom; 1945–1955 | Succeeded by Sir John Edelsten |
