= RAF Jurby =

Former Royal Air Force station on the Isle of Man

RAF Jurby

- "Quocunque Jeceris Stabit"
- IATA: none; ICAO: none

Summary
- Airport type: Military
- Owner: Air Ministry
- Operator: Royal Air Force
- Location: Jurby, Isle of Man
- Built: 1938
- In use: 1939–1963
- Elevation AMSL: 85 ft (26 m)
- Coordinates: 54°21′09″N 4°30′29″W

Map
- Location in Isle of Man

Runways
Direction	Length		Surface
Direction	ft	m	Surface
07/25 (originally 08/26)	3,818 (4,799)	1,164 (1,463)	Concrete
16/34 (disused)	2,969	905	Concrete

Royal Air Force Jurby, or more simply RAF Jurby, is a former Royal Air Force station built in the north west of the Isle of Man. It was opened in 1939 on 400 acres (1.6 km^{2}) of land acquired by the Air Ministry in 1937, under the control of No. 29 Group, RAF. During the Second World War the station was used for training as No. 5 Armament Training Station, No. 5 Air Observers School, No. 5 Bombing & Gunnery School and the No. 5 Air Navigation & Bombing School. In addition RAF Jurby also played host to a variety of operational squadrons.

RAF Jurby was originally a grass airfield but was later equipped with hard runways. Operationally, it helped protect Belfast and Liverpool from German air raids, being strategically placed in order to offer fighter protection.

During the 1950s and 60s the No. 1 Initial Training School (No. 1 ITS) subsequently replaced by the No. 1 Officer Cadet Training Unit (No. 1 OCTU) was based at RAF Jurby, jokingly referred to by the trainee cadets as "The Camp on Blood Island".

Following the closure of the station in 1963, the airfield was used as a diversion for Ronaldsway Airport. To be able to accept Vickers Viscount turboprop airliners the main East–west runway was extended eastwards and bisected by the Ballamenagh Road (A14). To facilitate the use of the extended runway, barriers were placed across the road and the road was closed whilst the runway was in use.

The airfield has been earmarked for potential development as a future replacement for the current Isle of Man Airport as part of the Draft Area Plan for the North and West.

== Construction ==
As early as 1934 the flat northern plain of the Isle of Man had been identified as a suitable area for the construction of an airfield. This had been borne out by Sir Alan Cobham, who had pinpointed up to six suitable sites between Ballaugh and the Point of Ayre during a survey. This ideal location had led to a site at Close Lake, near the future RAF Jurby, being developed as Hall Caine Airport.

As part of the RAF Expansion Scheme the Manx Government was approached by the Air Ministry in 1937 with a view to establishing an Aircraft Armament Training Camp for air crew in the sparsely populated Parish of Jurby.

The site chosen consisted mainly of land which had belonged to the Ballamoar Estate, which contributed 307 acres to the total area. Despite local objections from approximately 60 farmers, the proposal went ahead, with Tynwald, the Manx parliament, approving the Defence Bill put forward by the Island's Lieutenant Governor, William Leveson-Gower, 4th Earl Granville.

Work on RAF Jurby began at the end of September 1938, the contractors being Gerrard & Sons of Manchester. Large earth movers arrived and began levelling the area. However, there were serious concerns about the labour force to be used on the airfield, mainly regarding the importation of Irish labourers, there being insufficient local labour able to undertake the work. The construction of the station attracted crowds eager to see the developments of such an undertaking on the Isle of Man, particularly the sight of the plant machinery and the construction of the huts to be used for the housing of the workers, which were erected in early October. To level the land, gravel was taken from the Point of Ayre as well as spoil from the mines at Laxey and Foxdale.

As it developed, RAF Jurby made an increasingly dramatic imposition on the surrounding rural landscape, its conspicuous features being visible across the northern part of the Island. By the beginning of 1939, in the region of 400 men were engaged with the construction of the station and work was progressing on the construction of huts and the underground services. Also at this time the contract for the electrical installation was awarded to the Doncaster Colliery Supply Co., Ltd. As the work continued, it was decided that additional land would be required. Tynwald approved the additional compulsory purchase of land in the area, this being undertaken by the Government Property Trustees.

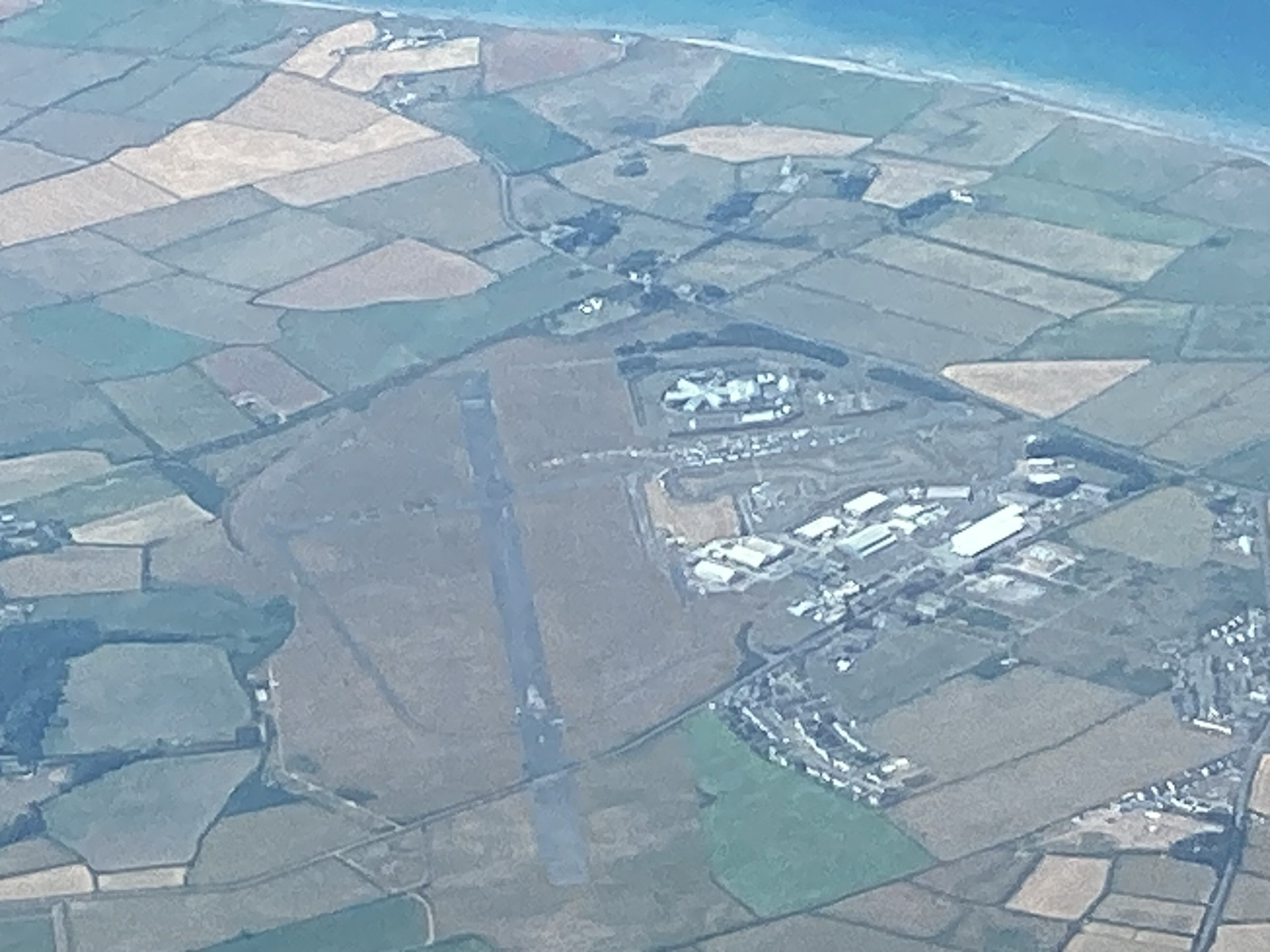
RAF Jurby, July 2026. In addition to the 1960s runway extension bisecting by the Ballamenagh Road (A14), much of the original station layout is still clearly visible.

=== Station Design ===
The station consisted of one F Type hangar, two T2 types, four Bellman hangars and nineteen Blister hangars. There were also technical and domestic buildings. The remaining aerodrome buildings (for technical activities and accommodation) were built in a compact layout behind the hangars, in an arrangement replicated across all of the Expansion Period airfields: Technical Area, Station Offices, Officers' Mess, Sergeants' Mess and Airmen's' Quarters. Roads were arranged either parallel or perpendicular to the Ballamenagh Road (A14) with the Guardroom directly facing the main entrance.

On the north side of the Ballamenagh Road was the parade ground. Heating in the technical rooms and classrooms was provided by hot water from a central coal-fired boiler supplied by a towered cistern. The whole station was connected by a Tannoy public address system.

=== Station Defence ===
The defence of the station was undertaken by 2778 Squadron RAF Regiment (2778 Sqn). The airfield was surrounded by 10 pillboxes (nine of which survive) and in addition there were seventeen trench air raid shelters to afford protection in the event of an attack. The shelters were brick constructed and covered with an earthen bank. They measured 50 ft (15.2 m) x 4 ft (1.2 m) the combined capacity of which could accommodate up to 800 personnel.

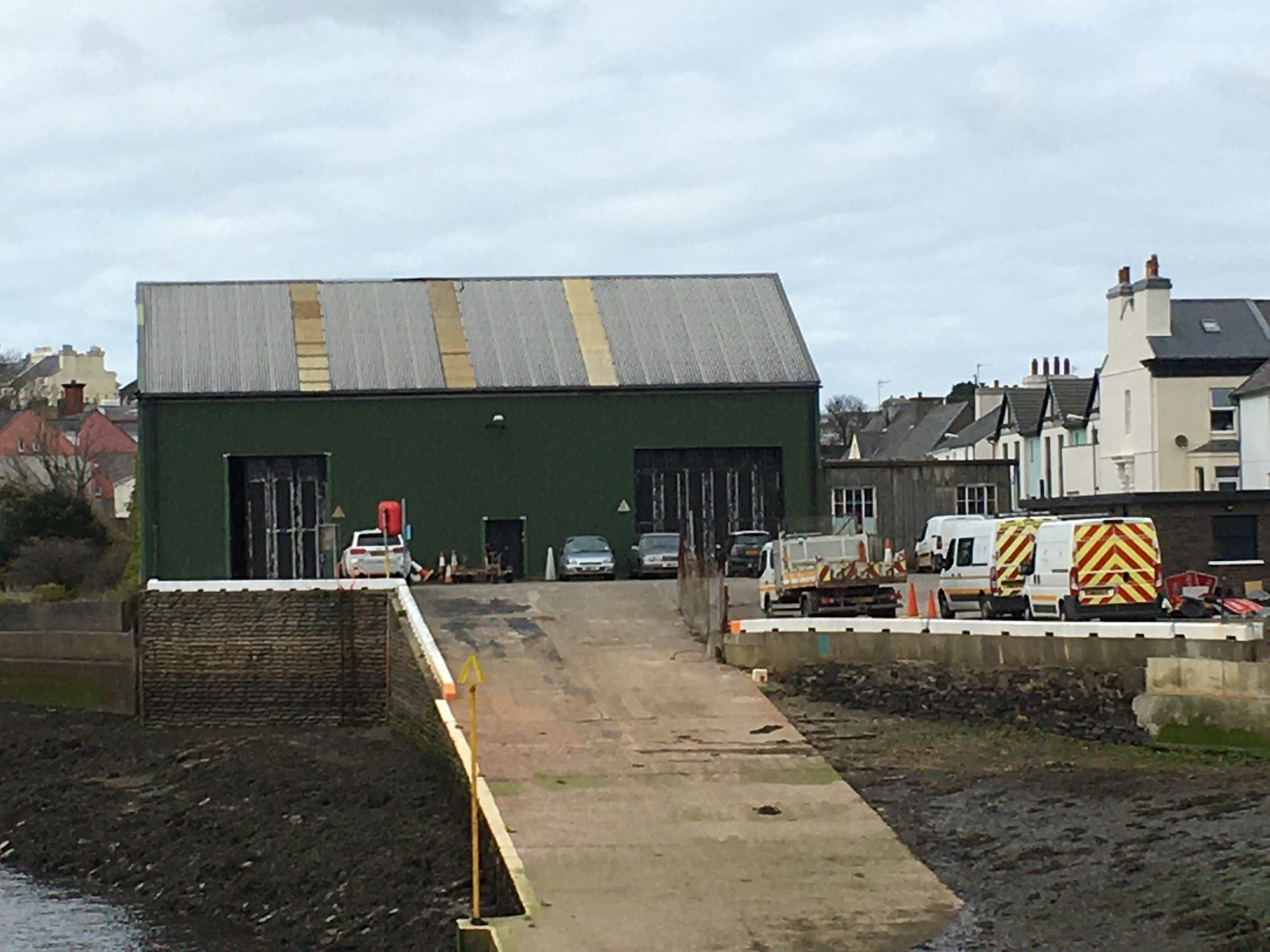
The RAF Jurby Boat House and slipway, North Shore Road, Ramsey (2023).

On the eastern side of the airfield was situated the Bomb Store. The bombs were taken from there to the aircraft in order for them to carry out their practice missions which would involve them dropping the ordnance on the nearby target ranges, controlled by RAF Jurby Head. Due to its importance, the Bomb Store was protected by four pillboxes as well as an earthen bank in order to afford protection from an explosion.

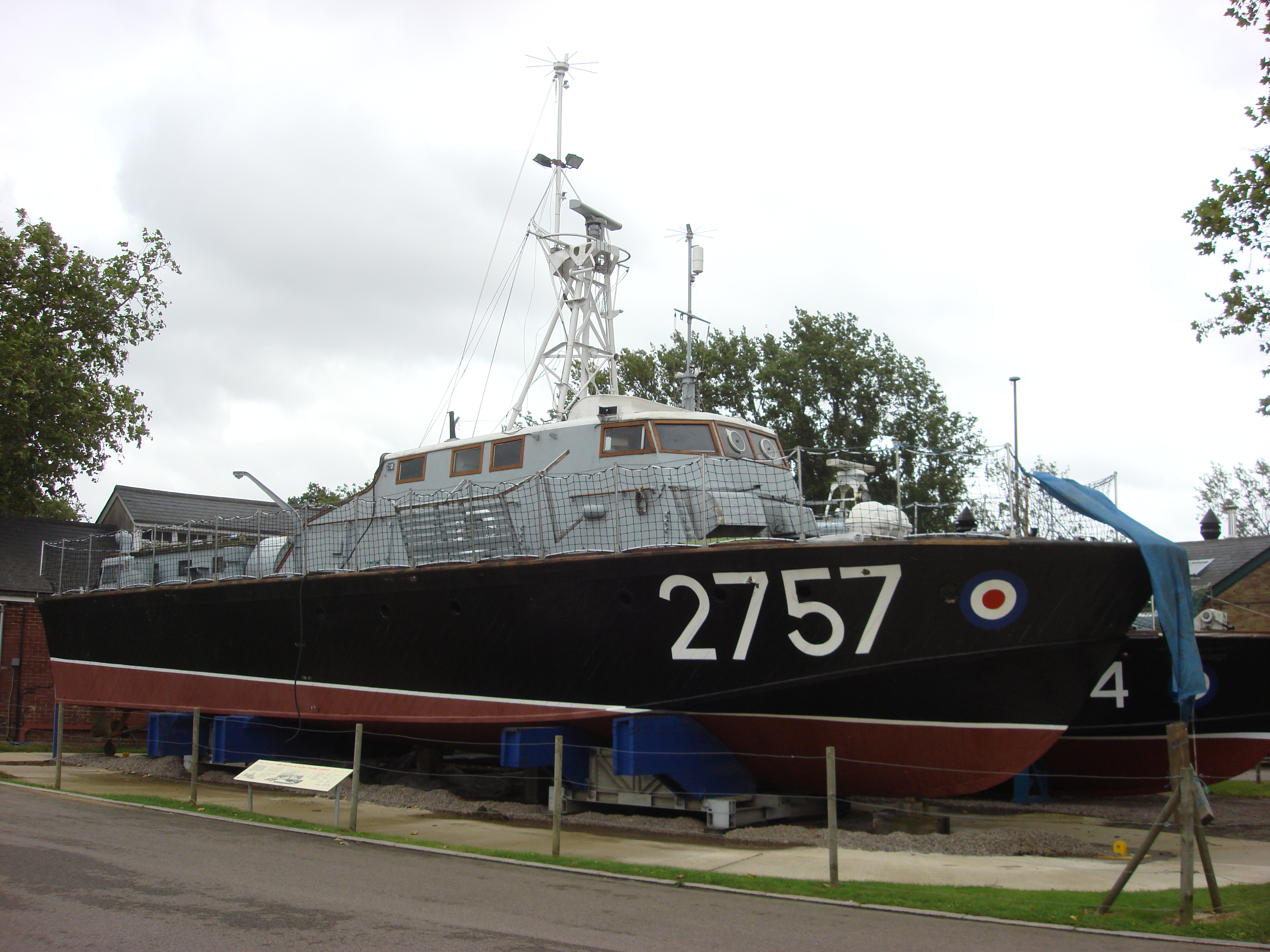
A Vosper Thornycroft 68ft Rescue & Target Towing Launch which was a type used by the 1113 MCU at Holyhead

=== Boat Station ===
Part of the development of RAF Jurby saw the creation of an RAF boat station at Ramsey. Air Ministry officials visited Ramsey in September 1938 as final plans for the station were drawn up. The station comprised a slipway and a boathouse with accommodation for 30 personnel. Two plots of land were required for the construction of the slipway and boathouse, the land concerned being on North Shore Road. The purpose of the station was to provide boats for the towing of the targets to be used in the bombing ranges and also to provide protection for the ranges. With the coming of war and the expansion of operations this boat station would evolve, becoming an RAF Air Sea Rescue Station.

== Second World War ==
Initially designated to be the No. 5 Armament Training Station, construction of RAF Jurby had been completed by the beginning of hostilities and officially opened on 18 September 1939 as No. 5 Air Observers School, which subsequently became the No. 5 Bombing and Gunnery School on 1 December. The station's Commanding Officer at this time was Wing Commander T. Ivens who was promoted to Group Captain in January 1940. From its opening RAF Jurby came under the control of Headquarters of No. 25 Group RAF.

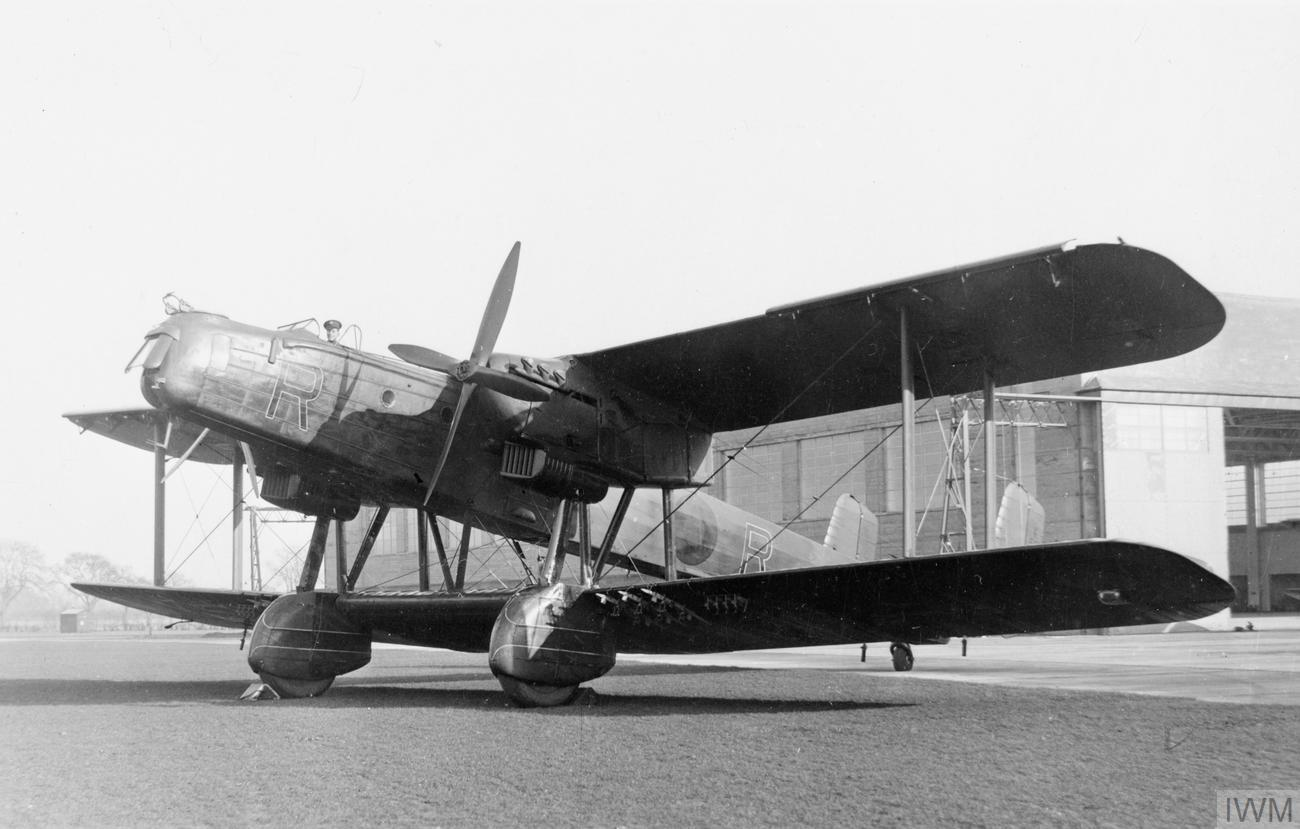
The Handley Page Heyford had been withdrawn from front line service by the outbreak of war, relegated to training stations.

=== No. 5 Bombing and Gunnery School ===
The role of the station as designated pre-war was to facilitate the training of bomber crews and referred to as an: Aircraft Armament Training Camp. The aircraft employed for the training were such as the Handley Page Heyford, which had started to be replaced in 1937 from the front line squadrons, having been deemed obsolete. Additional aircraft arrived, swelling the station's compliment, prominent amongst which was the Bristol Blenheim MkI. Air firing was practised on drogues towed behind single-engined aircraft specially adapted for the purpose. Westland Wallaces, Hawker Henleys and Fairey Battles were all used for this. As other aircraft types became obsolete regarding front line operations, so they too were transferred into the training role. Armstrong Whitworth Whitleys, released from operational squadrons, arrived at RAF Jurby in April 1940 joining the other aircraft types on the station. Some of the Whitleys had served with 166 Squadron, which had been disbanded in April and absorbed into No. 10 OTU at RAF Abingdon and from there a detachment went to RAF Jurby so as to gain further experience. The detachment was formed from "C Flight" No. 10 OTU, arriving at Jurby on 6 April.

For this reason Leonard Cheshire arrived at RAF Jurby on 21 May 1940. Cheshire had trained on Avro Ansons and was undertaking conversion to Whitley bombers at No 10. OTU at Abingdon when the unit was transferred to Jurby. Following this Cheshire was posted to 102 Squadron.

Another type which found a home at RAF Jurby was the Handley Page Hereford. These Napier Dagger engined aircraft had provided numerous problems with engine cooling which resulted in most of those built (by Short & Harland) being re-engined as Hampdens. The surviving Herefords served in training units only.

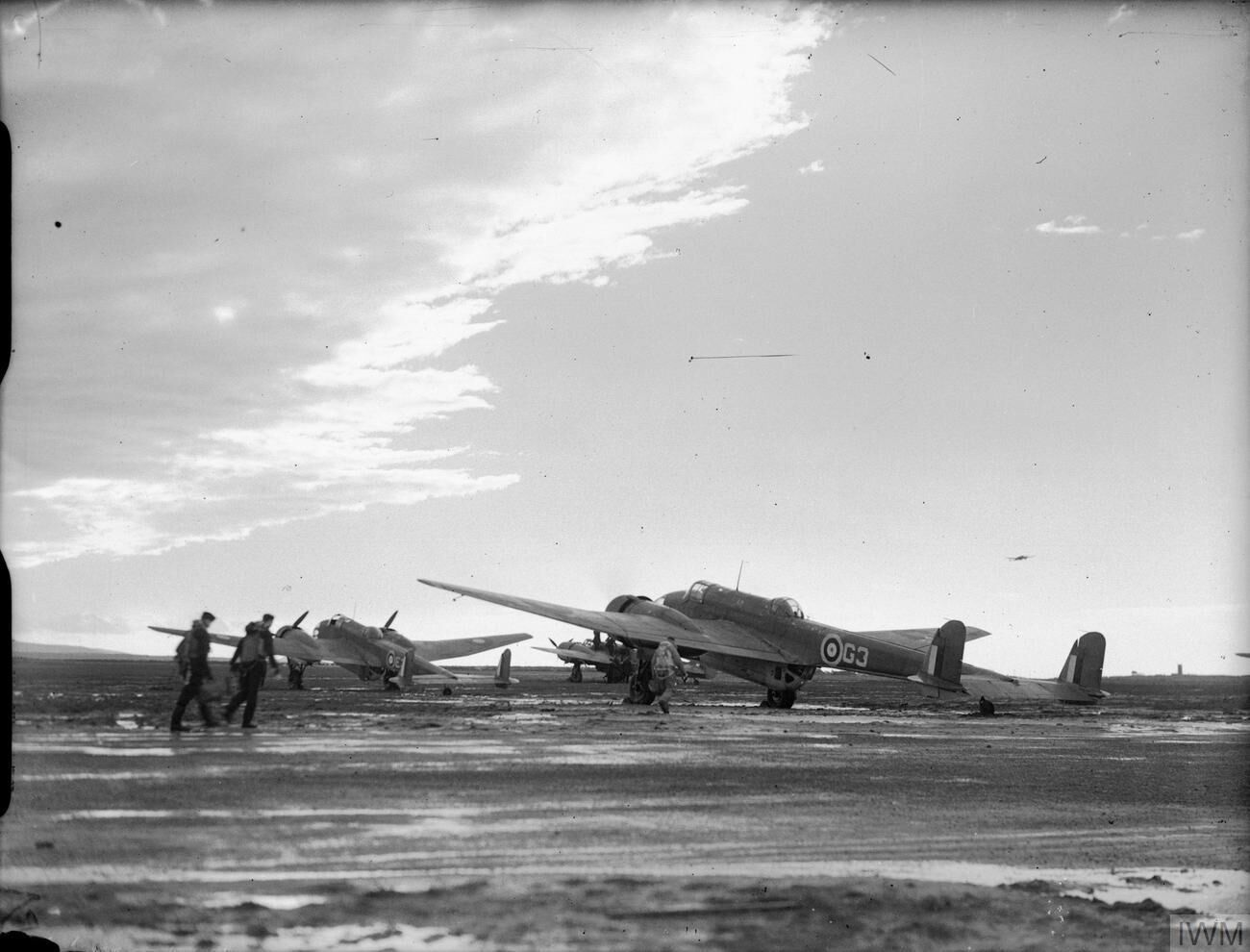
Trainee observers approach Handley Page Hampdens of No. 5 Bombing and Gunnery School at RAF Jurby.

There were a total of 28 Handley Page Herefords based at Jurby. As stated, the Napier Dagger engines of 1,000 h.p. were a constant source of trouble through overheating. Consequently, the Herefords had to have special treatment by being positioned close to the runway before engines were started up by the trolley acs, so they could take off for the bombing ranges with the minimum of delay.

=== Fighter Squadrons ===
Following the fall of France and the subsequent availability of bases in the Pas-de-Calais and low countries, the Luftwaffe undertook a strategic offensive against the industrialised regions of North West England, Northern Ireland and Central Scotland. Ideally situated to offer protection to these areas, RAF Jurby became home to five fighter squadrons for various periods between November 1940 and October 1941. The Jurby operation was subsequently augmented by the opening of a dedicated fighter station, RAF Andreas, in the autumn of 1941. At this time the fighter aircraft at both RAF Jurby and RAF Andreas came under the control of No. 9 Group RAF.

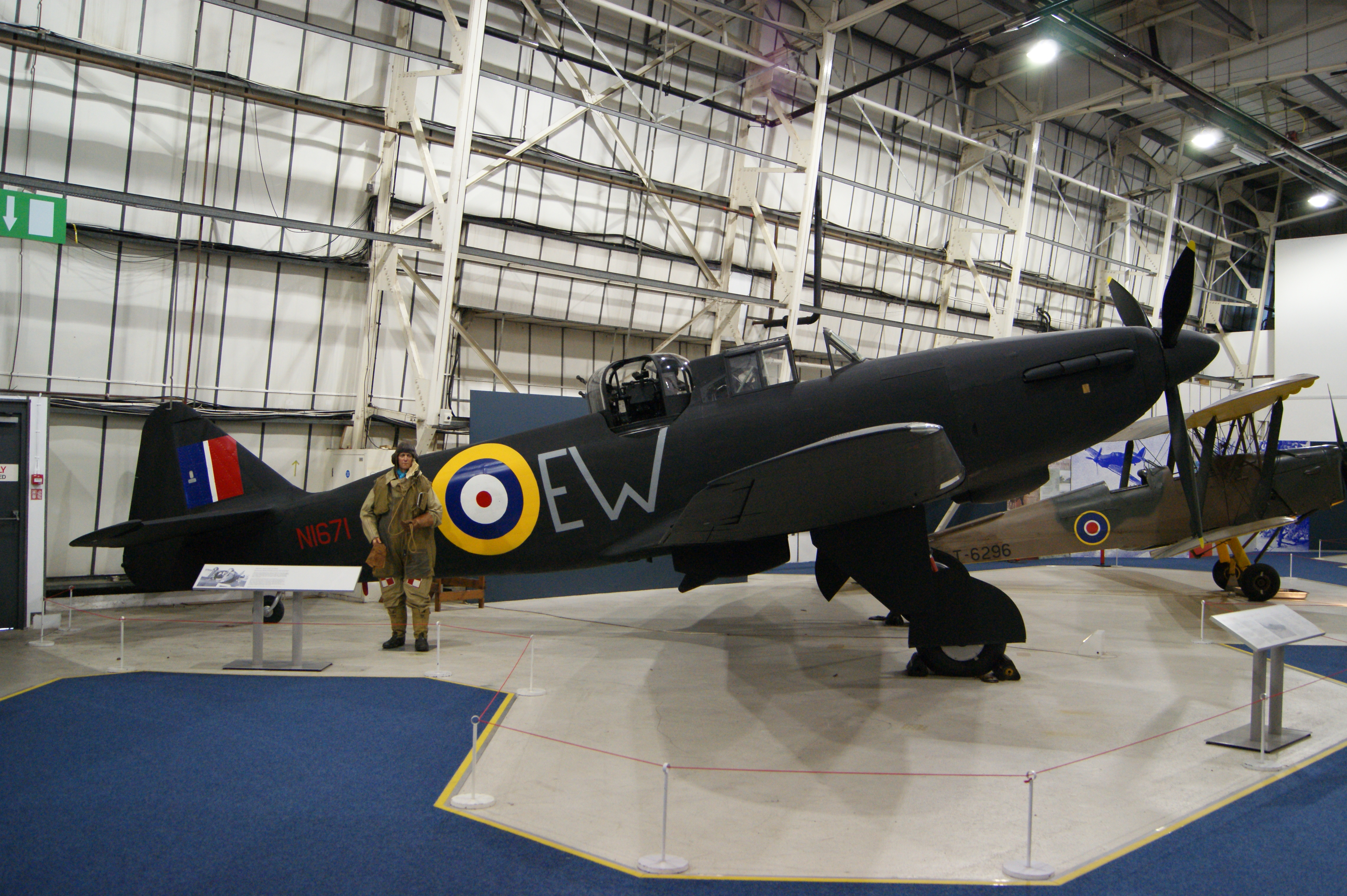
Boulton Paul Defiant in the markings of No.307 Polish Night Fighter Squadron, as it would have appeared during the squadron's tenure at RAF Jurby

==== 307 Squadron ====
307th Polish Night Fighter Squadron

The first fighter squadron at RAF Jurby was No. 307 Polish Night Fighter Squadron (307 Sqn) which arrived from RAF Kirton-in-Lindsey on 7 November 1940. This night fighter unit operated the Boulton Paul Defiant in its assigned role with the squadron coding EW. Under the command of Squadron Leader Stanisław Pietraszkiewicz the squadron completed its operational work-up at Jurby, becoming operational on 4 December 1940. By this time 307 Sqn was commanded by the maverick Squadron Leader, Stanisław Grodzicki, and 307 Sqn made their first operational sortie on 8 December. The squadron also provided a detachment from Jurby in order to cover Cranage and from the beginning of 1941 an additional detachment was sent to RAF Squire's Gate so as to provide defensive cover to Liverpool and Manchester. This detachment was joined by the rest of 307 Sqn when they left Jurby on 23 January. During its time a RAF Jurby 307 Sqn also operated Miles Masters, which were used in a training role.

==== 258 Squadron ====
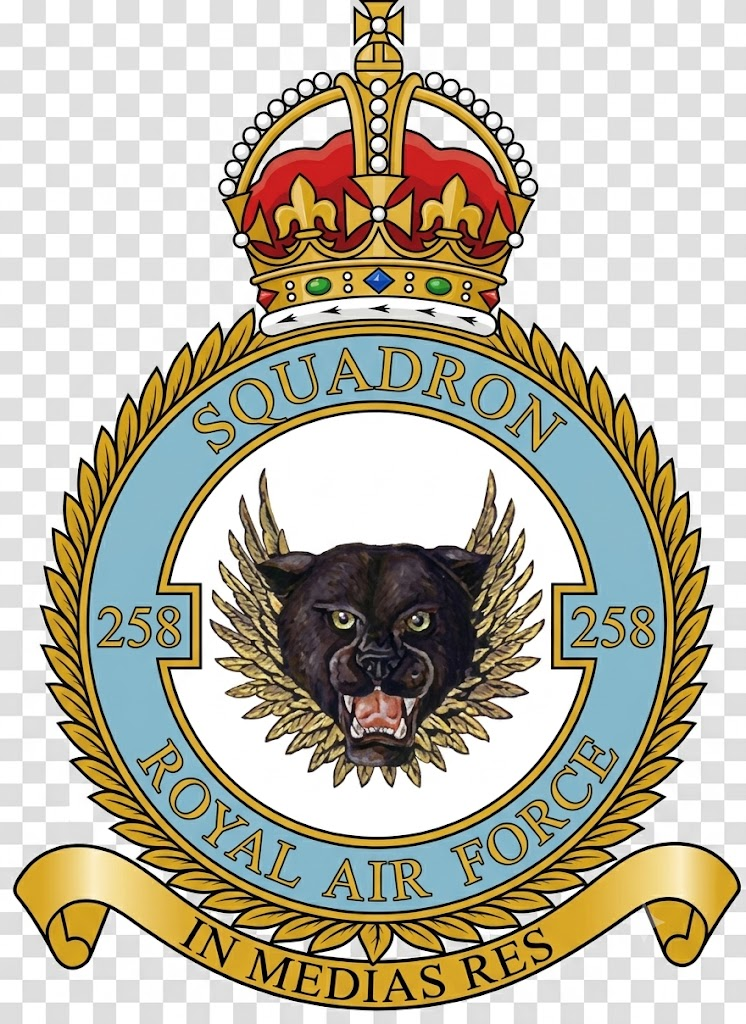
No._258_Squadron_RAF_badge

The first Hawker Hurricane Squadron to arrive at RAF Jurby was 258 Squadron (258 Sqn) which displayed the squadron code FH. The squadron had previously been based at RAF Acklington and took the place of 307 Sqn, arriving at Jurby in late January 1941. The tenure of 258 Sqn was brief, with the squadron leaving the station in April.

==== 312 Squadron ====
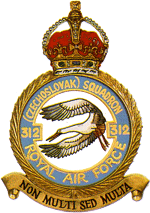
RAF312Sq

A second Hurricane squadron arrived to take the place of the departed 258 Sqn in April. Assigned the squadron code DU and manned mostly by Czechoslovak personnel, 312 Squadron (312 Sqn) had been based at RAF Speke from where its primary responsibilities encompassed defending the Port of Liverpool, after which it had a brief spell carrying out convoy patrols from RAF Valley before transferring to RAF Jurby. Whilst at Jurby the squadron undertook further convoy patrols over the Irish Sea and intensive low flying and firing practice over the Ayres. Like the previous residents 312 Sqn's time at Jurby was short-lived, moving south in May 1941, when it began escort missions from south-west England.

==== 302 Squadron ====
PSP Dywizjon 302

The next fighter squadron resident at RAF Jurby was No. 302 Polish Fighter Squadron (302 Sqn) taking up residence in May 1941. Again equipped with the Hawker Hurricane and with the squadron designation WX, 302 Sqn was a battle-hardened squadron having been formed in July 1940 from Polish airmen who had escaped the invasion of France. The squadron had seen action during the Battle of Britain as part of the Duxford Wing. In addition to providing defence against the Luftwaffe's night offensive, 302 Sqn also undertook convoy patrols in the Irish Sea. In August 1941 302 Sqn vacated Jurby, moving to the south of England and re-equipping with Supermarine Spitfires.

==== 457 Squadron ====
457 Squadron badge.jpeg

The first Spitfires arrived at RAF Jurby in August 1941. They belonged to 457 Squadron (457 Sqn) coded BP.

At the time of its formation the squadron's commanding officer, Squadron Leader Peter Malam Brothers, both flight commanders and all members of the ground crew were British, but most pilots were Australian. The squadron's ground crew component had been formed at RAAF Station Williamtown, New South Wales, on 10 June, and departed for England on 7 August; the same day 457 Sqn moved to RAF Jurby. Making full use of the training facilities, the squadron was also used as a clearing unit for pilots of No. 452 Squadron which at this time was operating in the south of England. In October 1941, 457 Sqn departed RAF Jurby to become the first squadron to reside at the newly opened RAF Andreas.

=== No. 5 Air Observers School ===
Following the findings of the Butt Report, citing a required improvement in the standards of navigation, RAF Jurby reverted to its former title of No. 5 Air Observers School in July 1941 with navigation, bomb aiming and air gunnery now forming part the station's remit. As part of the re-organisation Handley Page Hampdens arrived at Jurby as they were removed from front line operations, joining the Avro Ansons and the other training aircraft. Instructors were screened personnel who had completed a tour of operations on a front line bomber squadron.

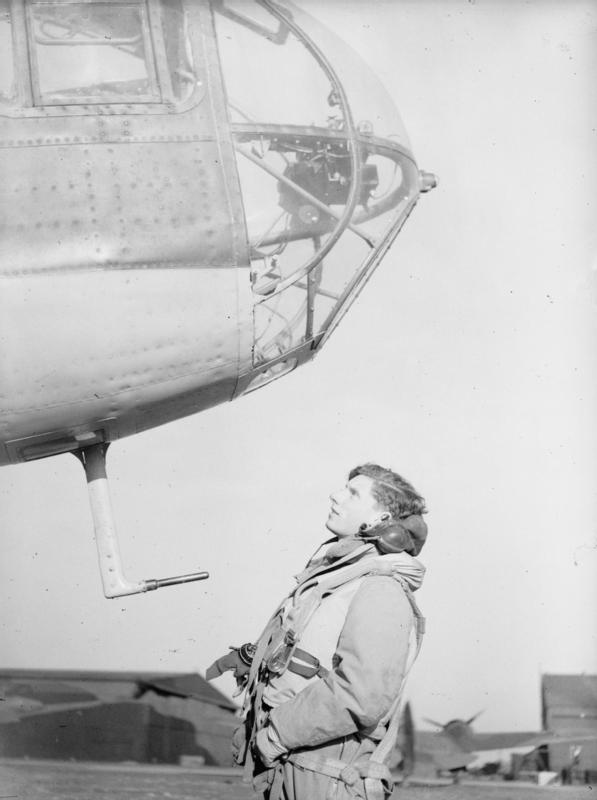
A student observer contemplates his 'office' in the nose of a Hampden before embarking on an early-morning flight at No. 5 Air Observers School, RAF Jurby, January 1942.

By the beginning of 1943 the Hampdens had gone and were being replaced by Avro Anson trainers, a total of 60 being recorded in February. The station's compliment still included 6 Blenheim I's and 15 Blenheim IV's together with 10 Westland Lysanders.

Further changes were being made to meet the demands of Bomber Command whose mainstay were the newly introduced heavy bombers such as the Handley Page Halifax and the Avro Lancaster both of which required seven crew members. The title 'Observer' disappeared to be replaced by more specialised categories- Navigator (N), Bomb Aimer (B) and Air Gunner (AG). At this time Bomber Command were also starting to benefit from advancements in radio navigation such as GEE and the ground mapping radar H2S.

By 1944 the RAF Training Command was also receiving qualified Navigators, Bomb Aimers and Air Gunners from the British Commonwealth Air Training Plan. This led to another re-organisation of the training undertaken at RAF Jurby which became known as the No. 5 Air Navigation and Bombing School from February 1944.

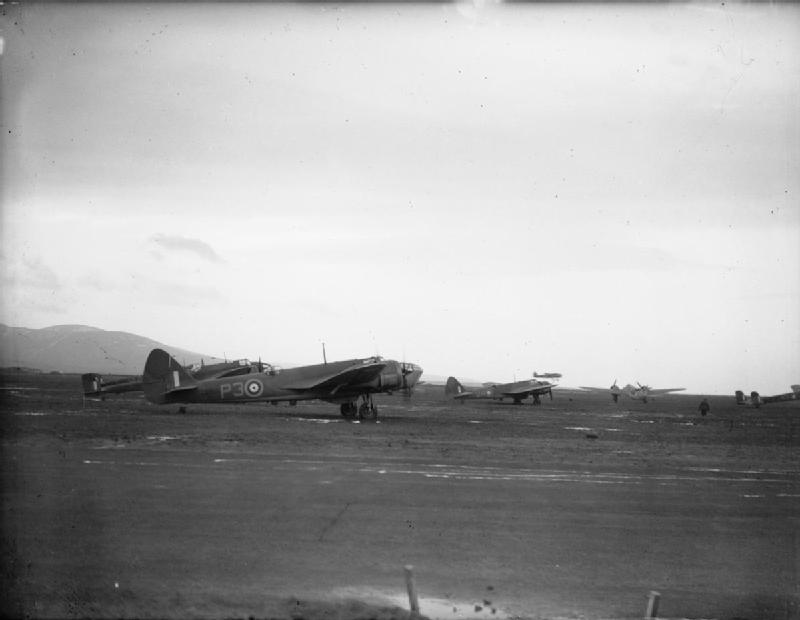
Bristol Blenheim Mark IV, Z5969 'P3', taxys past other Blenheims and Handley Page Hampdens of No. 5 Air Observers School, in an early January morning at Jurby, Isle of Man

==== Operation Millennium ====
The appointment of Sir Arthur Harris as Commander-in-Chief of RAF Bomber Command saw the direction of the strategic operations against Germany altered, part of which was to be the undertaking of a 1,000 bomber raid. The target of the raid was to be Cologne, the raid being carried out on the night of 30–31 May 1942 and code named Operation Millennium. RAF Bomber Command front line strength at this time numbered approximately 400 aircraft, it therefore being obvious that were the raid to meet the required composition aircraft from other branches of the Royal Air Force would be required for the undertaking. Aircraft were taken from both 91 and 92 Groups, Bomber Command's own operational training units, with further aircraft sourced from RAF Flying Training Command. At Jurby five Hampdens were taken off training duties and made ready. These were to be led by Wing Commander 'Jumbo' Edwards, an Oxford rowing blue, who was in charge of all flying operations at Jurby and who planned and flew all the routes used by the trainee navigators. Part of this readiness saw the yellow coloured undersides of the Hampdens required for training, being replaced by the matt black of Bomber Command. However, it was found that the rather worn-out Hampdens were not up to operational standards, being insufficiently equipped for night bombing operations and despite every effort by the crews during the waiting period, they, along with many other of the Training Command aircraft, were eventually scrubbed from the mission.

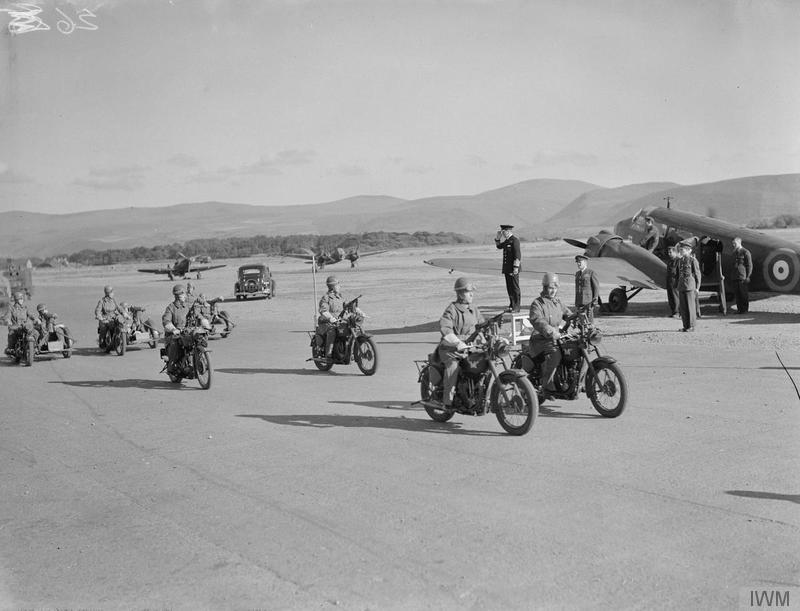
Admiral Sir Percy Noble C-in-C Western Approaches, takes the salute during his visit to RAF Jurby, 11 June 1942.

RAF Jurby did however contribute five aircraft towards the first 1,000 bomber raid which was carried out against Essen two nights later.

=== No. 5 Air Navigation and Bombing School ===
RAF Jurby was now responsible for the training of the type of navigator who would also have to be a bomb aimer in the medium bombers such as the Beaufighter and Mosquito. With air gunnery no longer part of the curriculum the Blenheims and Lysanders departed making room for more Ansons which were to number over 80 at this time.

The Ansons had been specially adapted for the navigation and bomb aiming training role with the 'glasshouse' turret removed. A desk was provided for the student navigator and a perspex panel in the nose was provided for the bomb aimer who lay in the prone position in front of the pilot.

Each Anson was assigned to a specific flight; 'A' flight (bomb aiming) and 'B' and 'C' flights (navigation). Now in use was the advanced Stabilized Automatic Bomb Sight which could self-adjust according to air and wind speeds fed into it. To operate correctly a minimum speed of 120 knots was required which, due to form drag, even on full throttle was difficult for the Anson to achieve with bomb doors open and external racks fitted. Bombs carried were 22 lb flash bombs, four of which were carried internally and four of which were carried externally on the bomb racks. For night work, an infrared target light was positioned on the Derbyhaven breakwater. Most of the bombing was done at various altitudes up to 6,000 feet, about the normal limit for the Anson.

=== No. 5 Air Navigation School ===
The renaming of the station's facility made little difference to the training programme at RAF Jurby. The Empire Air Training Scheme had been wound up leaving home training stations such as Jurby.

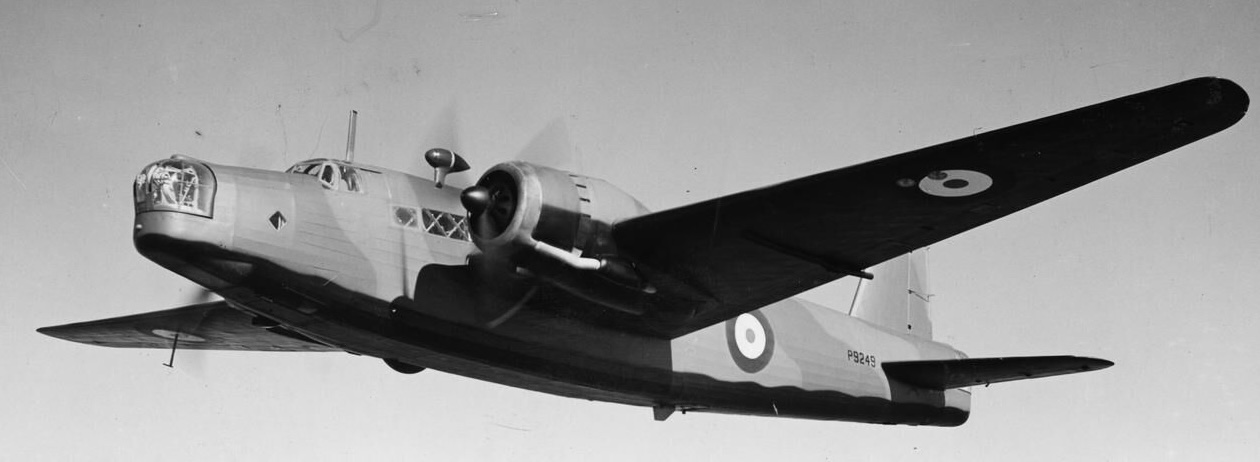
A Vickers Wellington, which formed part of No. 5 Air Navigation School at RAF Jurby.

The ageing Ansons were gradually being replaced by Wellington Mk Xs which now formed a conversion unit for advanced bombing techniques, while the Ansons continued with the navigation work. The personnel compliment on the Station by this time was in the region of 2,500.

With the ending of the war in the Pacific Theatre, the RAF began its post-war period of contraction, and on 17 September 1946, No. 5 Air Navigation School moved out and transferred to RAF Topcliffe in Yorkshire.

During 1945, RAF Jurby received various visits from Lockheed Lodestars which were ferrying Norwegian collaborators to be held in internee encampments on the island.

=== No. 11 Air Gunnery School ===
The change of role at RAF Andreas from that of a fighter station to that of a training establishment saw the creation of No. 11 Air Gunnery School. Whilst at Andreas air gunners underwent an intensive ten-week course, before passing on to the operational training units of RAF Bomber Command. With the closure of RAF Andreas at the end of September 1946, No. 11 Air Gunnery School transferred to Jurby and the Station had a brief spell of further activity, but this in turn ceased with the disbandment of the school in October 1947.

== Post War ==
Over 7,000 personnel had passed through the Station by the end of hostilities in 1945. By September 1947 the Station was under the command of Group Captain Edward Laine, however following the disbandment of No. 11 Air Gunnery School in October, the future of RAF Jurby became uncertain. One suggestion was that the Station would become a venue for ATC training. In 1948 various fixtures of the Station were sold off by tender, these included 9 Blister hangars and 20 Nissen huts. In the immediate post-war period the Station had also been used as a diversion aerodrome for Ronaldsway Airport – much as had Hall Caine Airport before the war – and this availability continued following the Station's placement on care and maintenance. Numerous diversions continued due to Ronaldsway's susceptibility to advection fog. However, due to the down grading of the airfield facilities at Jurby approach options were limited, and it afforded no ability for night operations. This use as a diversionary airport for Ronaldsway continued through 1949 and into the 1950s. An agreement was made with the Air Ministry to enable the use of the Station and ground staff from Ronaldsway would be transported to Jurby in order to support the operation.

The Station saw limited use at the end of April 1948, when it was used for an exercise by No. 515 Light Anti Aircraft Regiment, (RA), (TA), which was carrying out a practice defence deployment of the aerodrome. The Station was also hosted a model aircraft rally, organised by the Manx Model Aircraft Club.

The RAF Air Sea Rescue Boat Station at Ramsey, part of the Royal Air Force Marine Branch, remained active with a composition of two rescue launches.

=== No. 1 Initial Training School ===
In April 1950 a new role was found for RAF Jurby when the Station became home to No.1 Initial Training School (No.1 ITS) with the Station forming part of 23 Group. No.1 Initial Training School had been formed in 1949 and both wings, under the command of Group Captain John Jefferson, subsequently moved to Jurby with Group Captain Jefferson assuming the role of Station Commander.

All prospective RAF pilots and navigators, apart from those trained at RAF Cranwell for permanent commissions, underwent 18 months training broken down into three six-month periods. The first six months formed the preliminary training period prior to flying training, the second and third periods would see basic and applied flying introduced. RAF Jurby was the first establishment of its kind, however its annual output of 1,600 cadet pilots and cadet navigators was soon found out to be insufficient for operational requirements and as a consequence other schools were formed. Under the training programme trainees spent 24 weeks at Jurby, and upon successful completion of the initial stage the prospective candidates would be promoted to the rank of acting pilot officer on probation, this probationary period continuing until the end of the flying training.

Training at Jurby covered a wide range of subjects including drill, outdoor sport and leadership exercises. The technical syllabus would cover such subjects as meteorology, aerodynamics and radio operations both for communication and navigation. Whilst by this stage the Station was not a full-time operational flying station gliding was available to the cadets, this being carried out in two seat Sedbergh trainers. In addition Jurby had a communications flight which contained Chipmunks and Ansons.

Initiative exercises would also take place in the mountains including survival training and mountain treks and there was also an assault course. During the summer months sailing and fishing would also be available.

The Station underwent a period of upgrading in early 1951 when new structures for the accommodation and training of personnel were added. These additions comprised barrack rooms and lecture rooms and the conversion of the senior Cadet's Mess into a new Sergeant's Mess. On completion of the upgrade RAF Jurby could accommodate over 800 cadets.

RAF Jurby produced its own station magazine entitled, "It's Yours." The magazine featured articles and illustrations by Station personnel, and was also of interest to residents of the north of the Isle of Man as many of the articles referred to local issues. The price of the magazine was one shilling.

Following a reorganisation within the RAF, Jurby became part of 54 Group in May 1951. The Station continued as part of 54 Group until the Group's disbandment in 1953 after which RAF Jurby came under the umbrella of 21 Group. In August 1951 the Station received a visit from Marshal of the Royal Air Force Sir John Slessor who was accompanied by the Commander-in-Chief Flying Training Command, Sir Hugh Walmsley and the Air Officer Commanding 54 Group, Air Commodore Alan Betts.

In the spring of 1953 it was announced that the No. 1 Initial Training School at RAF Jurby would close at the end of May of that year. All traces of the operation were gone by early June, and RAF Jurby was placed on care and maintenance. Despite the Station being inactive, work continued on the construction of permanent married quarters on the site. The period of care and maintenance was short lived, and RAF Jurby became a training establishment for ground-based officers, NCOs and cadets attached to the RAF Regiment and other branches of the service.

Following the departure of No. 1 Initial Training School, RAF Jurby was subsequently transferred from the Control of No. 54 Group to No. 21 Group, and later in the year to Headquarters No. 22 Group under whose control it was destined to become the No. 1 Officer Cadet Training Unit.

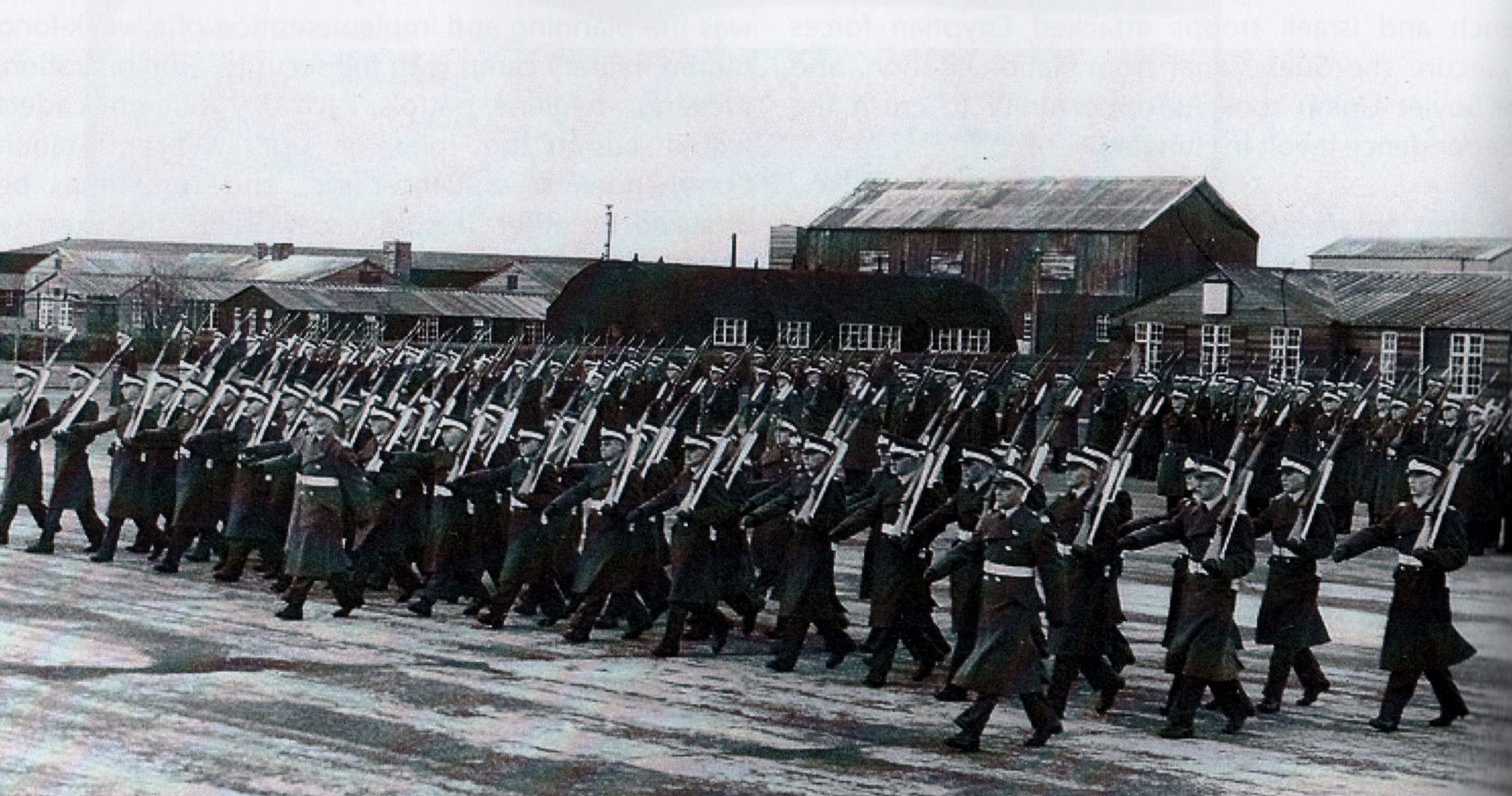
Passing Out Parade of members of No.1 Officer Cadet Training Unit, January 1957.

=== No. 1 Officer Cadet Training Unit ===
The Royal Air Force Officer Cadet Training Unit which was established at RAF Jurby was an amalgamation of the Officer Cadet Training Units from RAF Millom and RAF Spitalgate. Initially intended to be under the command of Group Captain George Richmond the unit opened at Jurby on 10 September 1953.

== RAF Jurby Mountain Rescue Team ==
In common with numerous other Royal Air Force Stations, RAF Jurby formed its own Mountain Rescue Unit. The team was used to locate crashed aircraft, both civilian and military, and on occasion the team would be airlifted across to the mainland in order to assist in rescue operations. The mountain rescue team would also exhibit their equipment at the annual Families Day.

== At Home Days ==
One of the highlights of the year would be the annual "At Home Day" which would see the Station personnel display the varied aspects of Station life to the general public, the occasion usually being held in commemoration of the Battle of Britain. The 1951 "At Home Day" featured aerobatic displays by de Havilland Vampire and Gloster Meteor jets, a rocket-assisted take off by a Fairey Barracuda of the Fleet Air Arm, a bombing demonstration given by de Havilland Mosquitos and a fly past by Avro Lincolns and Boeing Washingtons of RAF Bomber Command. In addition pleasure flights were available to the general public, operated by Manx Air Charters. On the Technical Site there was a gymnastic display, a dinghy drill in the static water tank and an exhibition of the clothing and equipment of the RAF Jurby Mountain Rescue Team.

== Incidents ==
As with so many other RAF Stations, RAF Jurby was no stranger to accidents; the mountainous backbone of the Isle of Man was notorious for its blanket of mist, and to the inexperienced pilot this could easily lead to tragedy. RAF Jurby's position as being primarily a training station meant that the majority of pilots operating from the station were of low experience, and it is documented that in the three-year period to the end of 1942, there had been 31 aircraft involved in accidents, with the loss of 76 lives. The majority of them involved aircraft from RAF Jurby, but the figures also include aircraft from other stations such as RAF Silloth and RAF Millom.

The first fatal wartime accident on Manx soil occurred on 1 January 1940, when an aircraft on a training flight from RAF Upper Heyford crashed into Snaefell in bad visibility, killing three of its four crew members. By mid 1941, fatal accidents were averaging one a month, and often involved the loss of life of several crew members. The Air Sea Rescue launches were kept on constant standby at the bombing and gunnery ranges. Even so, by the end of 1942 thirty-one lives had been lost in seven ditchings.

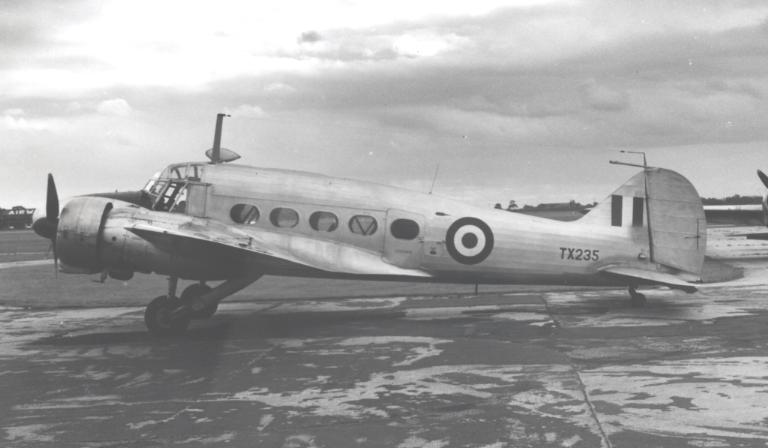
Avro Anson. The 'workhorse' of RAF Jurby

The list below details several incidents either involving Jurby-based aircraft or aircraft from other bases which crashed at the airfield.

- 13 January 1940 – RAF Jurby lost its first aircraft when a Fairey Battle went down at Ballamooar Curraghs after stalling whilst attempting to release its drogue. The pilot was killed.
- 27 March 1941 – a fully armed Handley Page Hereford based at RAF Jurby, crashed onto Ballaragh farm house in Lonan. The Hereford was approaching the coast on a wet and foggy morning when it crashed into the roof of the farmhouse, three of the four crew members were killed.
- 9 September 1941 – on this day, two aircraft were lost over the Isle of Man. The first, a Blackburn Botha based at the Coastal Command training station at RAF Silloth, crashed into North Barrule with the loss of all five lives. In the second crash, Jurby lost three aircrew when a Handley Page Hereford crashed at Ballacreggan Farm, Bride.
- 23 June 1942 – two Jurby-based Blenheims collided over Knockaloe Farm, south of Peel. They were on gunnery practice and were criss-crossing behind the drogue being towed by a Lysander. The Blenheims crashed in pieces into the fields below, both crews of three being killed.
- 26 June 1942 – an Avro Anson crashed at Scout's Glen, Castleward, Douglas. The crew of six were killed.
- 27 November 1944 – a Vickers Wellington MkX, LP176, belonging to No. 85 Operational Training Unit RAF (85 OTU) based at RAF Husbands Bosworth was carrying out a training sortie over the Irish Sea when it suffered a failure of its port engine. The pilot, Flight Sergeant E. Richmond, elected to land the aircraft at Jurby however during the course of the landing it became apparent that the aircraft was destined to over run the runway. Consequently, Flt Sgt Richmond elected to raise the landing gear in order to arrest the momentum of the aircraft resulting in the aircraft sustaining damage. All five crew members escaped the incident unharmed and although the aircraft sustained damage to various components, the damage was classified as Cat B (denoting the damage as slight).
- 20 May 1945 – a Sunderland flying boat of No. 423 Squadron had taken off from Loch Neagh to search for surrendering U-boats. While still climbing, the aircraft entered thick cloud over the Mourne Mountains and came in contact with one of the summits. The hull was badly damaged and one of the engines caught fire. Unable to return to base, the aircraft headed for RAF Jurby. Instead of landing on the grass, the pilot elected to land the aircraft on the No. 2 runway, sending up showers of sparks as it ground to a halt. The crew were able to abandon the flying boat before it was destroyed by fire and the resulting massive explosion from the four depth charges on board.
- 26 May 1959 – Avro Anson VM322 was landing at RAF Jurby following a flight from RAF North Coates when the tire on the right main landing gear burst temporarily resulting in the aircraft becoming uncontrollable. The aircraft subsequently came to rest enabling the two crew members on board to escape the aircraft without injury. The aircraft was subsequently written off.

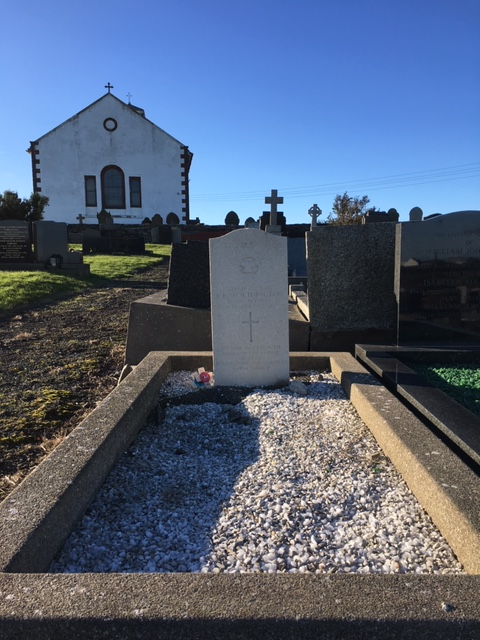
The grave of Group Captain Francis Richard Worthington, St. Patrick's Church, Jurby

=== Avro Anson VM418 ===
Arguably the most well-known crash concerning RAF Jurby occurred on Thursday 6 September 1953, and involved two Station Commanders; Group Captain Francis Worthington (RAF Jurby) and Group Captain George Richmond (RAF Millom).

Group Captain Worthington had flown to RAF Millom in the Jurby communications aircraft, Avro Anson T. Mk.20 VM418, in order to collect Group Captain Richmond who was due to succeed him as Station Commander as part of the Station's transition from No. 1 Initial Training School to No. 1 Officer Cadet Training Unit. The aircraft departed RAF Millom at 12:40hrs with the two Group Captains on board, together with another two passengers; Wing Commander Francis Fenton and Squadron Leader Roy Charter. The weather on the day was reported as misty, the conditions shrouding the mountainous spine of the Isle of Man, and when the Anson failed to arrive at Jurby at its allotted time of 13:15hrs a search and rescue operation was put into effect. The wreckage of the Anson was found on the slopes of Clagh Ouyr (1,808 ft) above the Black Hut on the Snaefell mountain road. All four occupants died as a result the impact.

An RAF Court of Inquiry was held and the findings were that there was no mechanical or technical failure of the aircraft and that the accident was caused by a navigation error with no allocation of blame. An inquest was held at Ramsey which in turn recorded the same conclusion. The body of Group Captain Worthington was buried at St. Patrick's Church, Jurby.

== Freedoms bestowed on the station ==
During its existence, RAF Jurby received both the Freedom of Ramsey and the Freedom of Douglas.

=== Freedom of Ramsey ===
Saturday 30 April 1955, saw the Freedom of Ramsey bestowed on RAF Jurby. The town's Market Place was used as a parade ground for the occasion, with the Title Deed presented by the Chairman of Ramsey Commissioners to Group Captain Burnett, Officer Commanding RAF Jurby. The parade consisted of 300 airmen and 20 officers, with the Royal Air Force Ensign being flown from the flagstaff of Ramsey Town Hall. Among those in attendance was the Lieutenant Governor of the Isle of Man, Sir Ambrose Dundas Flux Dundas, the Lord Bishop of the Isle of Man and the Air Officer Commanding No. 22 Group, Air Vice Marshal James Fuller-Good. Music was provided by the No. 1 Regional Band of the RAF.

=== Freedom of Douglas ===
On Thursday 7 July 1955, Royal Air Force Station Jurby received the Freedom of the Borough of Douglas. The event was marked by a parade along Douglas Promenade.

== Units ==
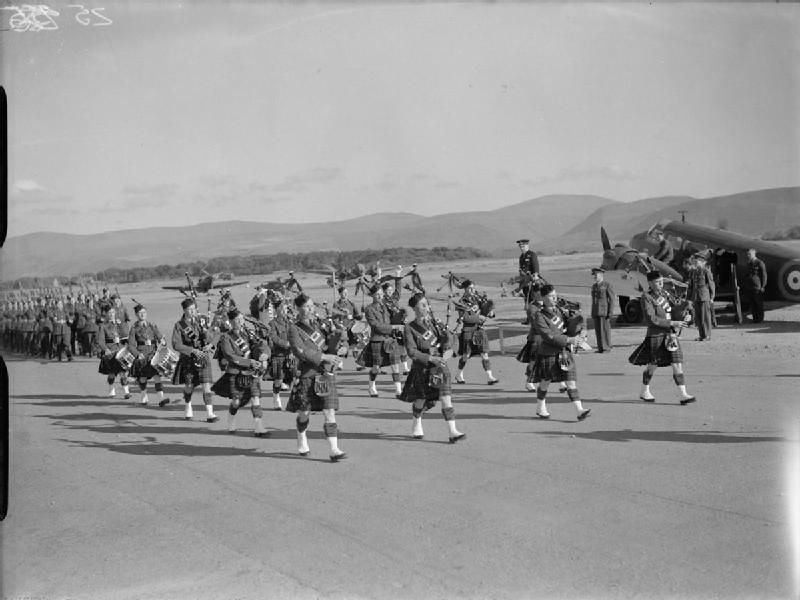
The Defence Regiment, led by the stations pipe band, march past Admiral Percy Noble at RAF Jurby, Isle of Man. The Airspeed Envoy aircraft in which the Commander in Chief flew to the Isle of Man can be seen in the background.

During the course of the operation of the station, the following units were at sometime based at RAF Jurby:

09/39 to 09/39, No. 5 Armament Training Station.

09/39 to 12/39, No. 5 Air Observers School with Handley Page Heyford.

12/39 to 07/41, No. 5 Bombing and Gunnery School with Fairey Battle, Handley Page Hereford, Bristol Blenheim and Westland Wallace aircraft.

11/40 to 01/41, 307 Sqn, with Bolton Paul Defiant.

02/41 to 04/41, 258 Sqn with Hawker Hurricanes.

04/41 to 05/41, 312 Sqn with Hawker Hurricanes.

05/41 to 08/41, 302 Sqn with Hawker Hurricanes.

07/41, Renamed No. 5 Air Observers School, with Avro Anson, Hawker Henley and Handley Page Hampden.

08/41 to 10/41, 457 Sqn with Supermarine Spitfires.

02/44 to 09/46, Air Navigation and Bombing School with Ansons and Vickers Wellingtons. 5/45, Renamed No. 5 Air Navigation School, moved to RAF Topcliffe.

09/46 to 10/47, No. 11 Air Gunnery School from RAF Andreas. Airfield then on care and maintenance.

04/50 to 07/53, No. 1 Initial Training School.

09/53 to 09/63, No. 1 Officer Cadet Training Unit.

02/64 to /72, After RAF closure used as a diversion airfield for Ronaldsway Airport. Domestic Site used by Territorial Army.

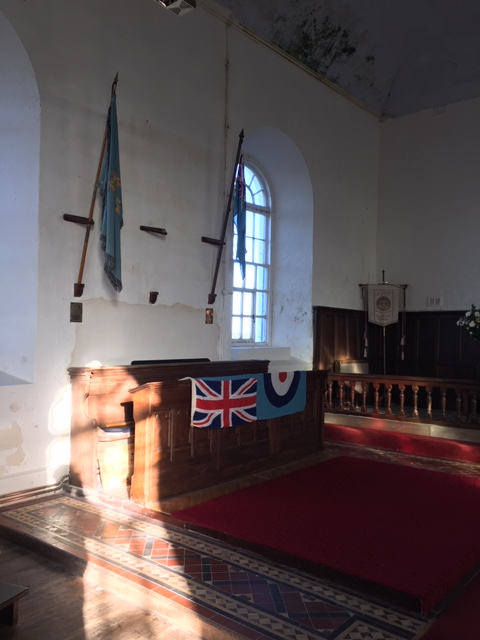
Station ensigns of RAF Jurby and RAF Jurby Head, St. Patrick's Church, Jurby

== Former station commanders ==
- Wing Commander T. S. Ivens September 1939 – October 1939
- Group Captain A. V. P. Daley AFC October 1939 – January 1940
- Group Captain T. S. Ivens January 1940 – January 1941
- Group Captain E. R. Alford OBE, MC January 1941 – May 1943
- Group Captain J. J. Williamson May 1943 – January 1944
- Wing Commander A. M. Taylor January 1944 – July 1944
- Wing Commander W. Dougall July 1944 – June 1945
- Wing Commander C. L. Hullock June 1945 – October 1945
- Wing Commander D. M. Strong October 1945 – September 1946
- Group Captain C. Crawford September 1946 – May 1947
- Group Captain E. J. Laine May 1947 – March 1949
- Flight Lieutenant A. P. Jones March 1949 – November 1949
- Squadron Leader R. A. R. Falconer DFM November 1949 – April 1950
- Group Captain J. N. Jefferson OBE April 1950 – June 1951
- Group Captain F. R. Worthington June 1951 – September 1953
- Group Captain V. Fairfield OBE September 1953 – August 1954
- Group Captain P. Burnett DSO, DFC August 1954 – March 1957
- Group Captain E. J. Palmer March 1957 – January 1959
- Group Captain W. T. Brooks DSO, OBE, DFC January 1959 – April 1961
- Group Captain A. P. Dart DSO, DFC April 1961 – September 1963
- Flight Lieutenant L. Jones
- Flight Lieutenant J. Conning

== Royal Visit ==
On 6 July 1945, as part of a tour of the Isle of Man, RAF Jurby was visited by King George VI and Queen Elizabeth. They also attended HMS Valkyrie before driving to Jurby where personnel from both RAF Jurby and RAF Andreas were inspected. On conclusion they flew out from RAF Jurby on a Douglas Dakota of the King's Flight to RAF Northolt.

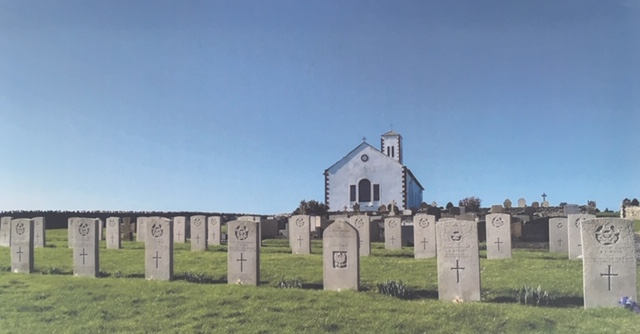
Military graves at Jurby Parish Church, Isle of Man

== Closure ==
On Thursday 10 January 1963 an announcement was made that RAF Jurby was to close in the autumn of that year. The announcement was made by the Station's commanding officer who also stated that the Officer Cadet Training Unit would transfer to RAF Feltwell. It was also stated that of the 230 civilians employed at the base and that those who were 'established' (i.e. had been employed for more than three years) would be offered alternative employment within the government.

Having been at the forefront of local life in many aspects, particularly that concerning sport, the news of the closure of RAF Jurby was met with widespread sadness on the Isle of Man.

RAF Jurby closed in September of that year.

== Post-RAF and current use ==
During the early 1970s the camp area of the airfield was used as a training camp for the Territorial Army.

Jurby Training Camp closed in late 1986 but the Officers mess remained until 1989.

The airfield is in part still usable. Many of the airfield buildings on the northern side of the Ballamenagh Road were demolished in the mid to late 2000s and only the road and path layouts exist alongside foundations.

Jurby Isle of Man Territorial Army Training Camp.
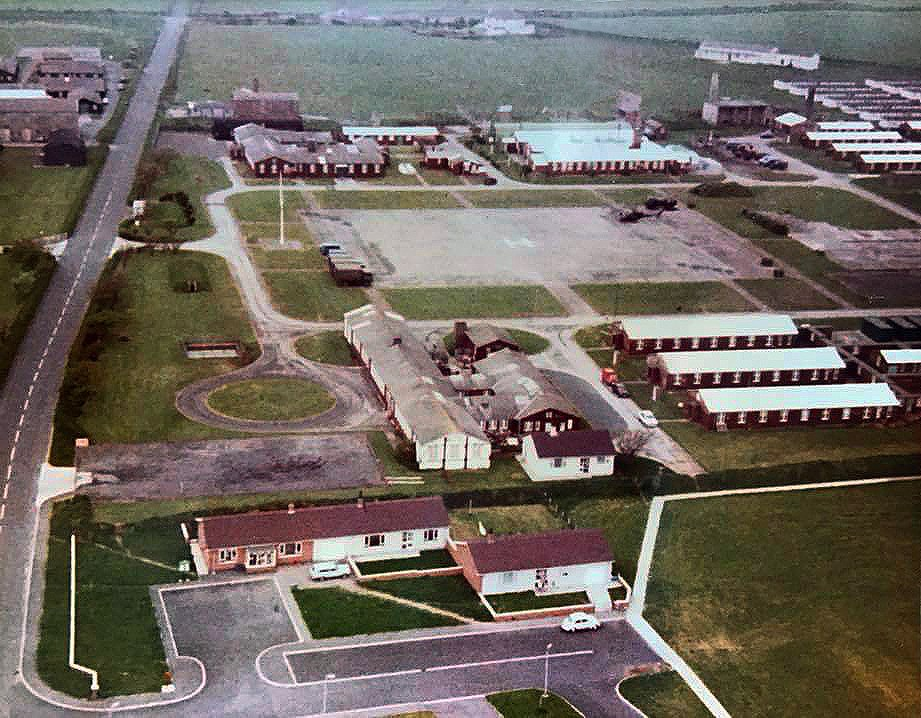
Aerial view of Jurby Camp (circa 1986)

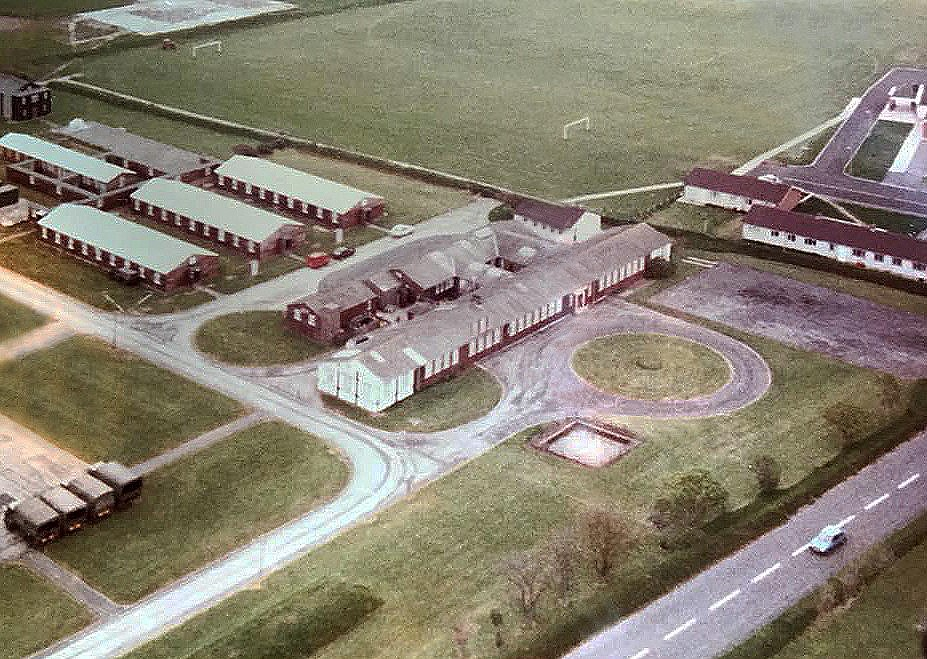

One of the original wooden buildings that formed the officers mess survived until December 2009. Having been built in 1938 to last for just 10 years it was converted in the 1960s to a hotel, the Jurby Hotel. Plans were announced in 2009 to build a new health centre on the site and the Jurby Health and Community Centre opened in January 2012

Many of the original hangars can still be seen on the south side of the Ballamenagh Road though have been re-clad with more modern materials. This area received a £2m government injection to fund a new main entrance with resurfaced roads in 2008 and is known as the Jurby Industrial Estate. Other buildings including the Control Tower and the increasingly rare timber buildings survive in various states of disrepair, some of which date back to 1939. The former Guard House has been developed into a cafe and restaurant. The work carried out to the building consisted of replacing the exterior to look like-for-like and replacing certain parts of the interior. Other buildings remain in use including the largest hangar which is home to lorry and large vehicle mechanics.

The airfield had been used for an annual airshows until 2004. Since its inaugural event in 2009, the airfield has been home to the annual Jurby Festival of Speed which takes place on the middle Sunday of the Islands Classic TT (formerly Grand Prix) fortnight. Although not an airshow, the 2012 festival received a flypast from a Spitfire and a C-47 Dakota in 2013. The main events of the day are a bike rally and friendly races around the "course" which takes in sections of the runway, taxiway and perimeter track. Attendance to the site has reached 10,000 people. Motor Sports are able to make use of the airfield course all year round.

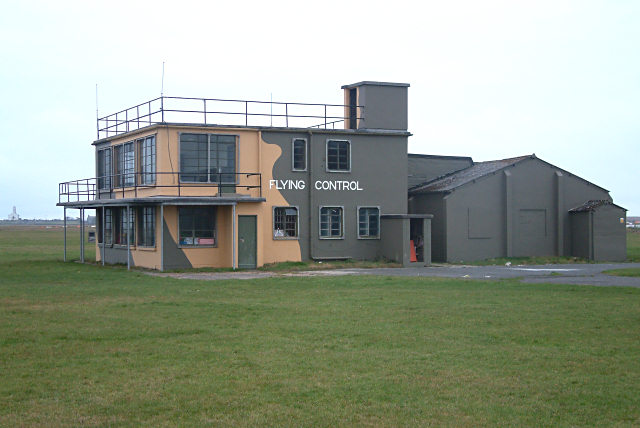
The Visual Control Room, Jurby Airfield

From 2007 to 2016, one of the re-clad RAF Bellman hangars was home to the facilities of Excalibur Almaz whose office base is in Douglas, the capital of the Isle of Man. The company bought two Soviet Spacecraft for temporary storage with the intention of launching passenger trips to space by 2013 (launching from a former CIS-state rather than the Isle of Man). The craft were imported into the Isle of Man in 2011, and then removed when Excalibur's lease expired in 2016. Their equipment was never launched and is to be converted into an educational exhibit.

Another of the re-clad Bellman hangars (Hangar 230) has been home to the free-entry Jurby Transport Museum since 2010. The museum is home to many buses and trams that have formed part of the islands public transport network for many years. In keeping with their aviation surroundings, there are the airship parts mentioned above, a Spitfire replica and a glider kept in pieces in the back storage yard.

=== Manx Gliding Club ===
The Manx Gliding Club formed at Jurby Airfield in the early 1990s with a single Slinsby T.53. Gliding had initially taken place by the Royal Air Force at RAF Jurby during the 1950s flying Slingsby T.31's & T.21's. After the RAF left Jurby gliding on the island had discontinued. The club was renamed the Islanders Gliding Club joining the British Gliding Association in the 1990s. Additional funds were spent on winches, ground equipment, additional aircraft such as an Auster and a Ka2b. Due to high rents at Jurby the club soon moved on to a small airfield at Hall Caine and then to Andreas Airfield and thus regular flying activity ceased again at Jurby.

=== Advanced Airship Corporation ===
In late 1982, a newly demerged airship company (Wren Skyships) relocated to Jurby airfield from Cardington in Bedfordshire. The firm began work on a new design, the Advanced Non-Rigid (ANR). Wren Skyships became the Advanced Airship Corporation (AAC) in 1988. Construction of the prototype ANR was commenced, but envelope problems delayed its completion, and AAC went into liquidation during the early 1990s recession. The prototype gondola was moved to a site in Shropshire after liquidation of AAC and now exists in a museum in the Netherlands. Some parts were stored for some time in a hangar on the airfield site and more recently re-located to the Manx Transport Museum which opened in Jurby in 2009. The large hangar built for the airship was removed and the base of the building is now home to a go-kart track.

=== Isle of Man Prison ===
The Isle of Man prison was re-located to Jurby Airfield in 2008 from a dilapidated Victorian building in Douglas. The prison is built within the airfield site with the entrance road cutting through the otherwise untouched western taxiway.

=== Future Isle of Man Airport ===
In July 2024 it was announced that Isle of Man Government is considering developing the airfield as a future replacement for Ronaldsway Airport. As part of the Draft Area Plan for the North and West. The land around the airfield is to be zoned to allow for a future runway extension of up to 2,600 metres (8,500 ft) and 45 metres (148 ft). This will give the Isle of Man an airport the size of Liverpool Airport. The future facility has been dubbed the Sir Mark Cavendish Airport in honour of local sporting legend Sir Mark Cavendish.

== See also ==
- List of former Royal Air Force stations
- RAF Jurby Head, an offshore bombing range
- RAF Andreas
- 54 Air-Sea Rescue Marine Craft Unit RAF
- HMS St George
- HMS Urley
- HMS Valkyrie
