= Jonathan Levine (disambiguation) =

Jonathan Levine (born 1976) is an American film director and screenwriter.

Jonathan Levine may also refer to:

- Jonathan LeVine (born 1968), New York City art dealer
- Jon Levine (musician), Canadian producer, songwriter and musician
- Jon Levine (tennis) (born 1963), American former tennis player
- Jon Levine (neuroscientist), American neuroscientist

== See also ==
- Jonathan Levin (disambiguation)
