= RAF Jurby Head =

Former Royal Air Force air weapons range, on the Isle of Man

RAF Jurby Head
- Jurby in Isle of Man

Site information
- Type: Air Weapons Range
- Owner: Ministry of Defence
- Operator: Royal Air Force
- Condition: Closed

Location
- Location in Isle of Man
- Coordinates: 54°21′6.09″N 004°32′57.19″W

Site history
- Built: 1939
- In use: 1939 – 6 July 1993

Airfield information
- Identifiers: ICAO: EGOJ

RAF Jurby Head is a former Royal Air Force air weapons range, on the north west coast of the Isle of Man. The range operated between 1939 and 1993.

== History ==
As part of the RAF Expansion Scheme the Manx Government was approached by the Air Ministry in 1937 with a view to establishing an Aircraft Armament Training Camp for air crew in the sparsely populated Parish of Jurby. This opened as RAF Jurby in September, 1939.

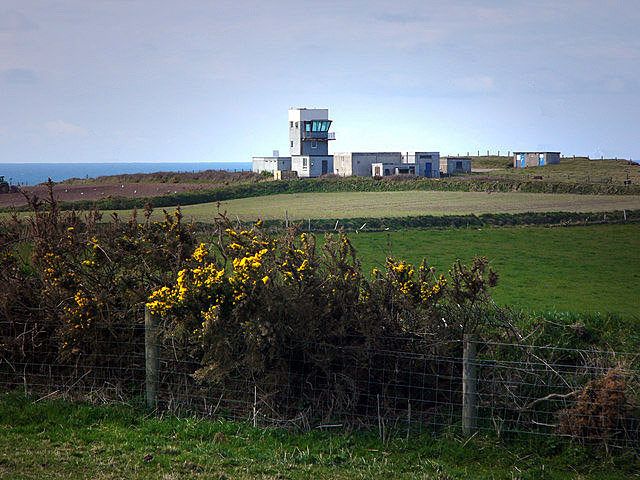
RAF Jurby Head - Isle of Man

=== World War II ===
As operations at RAF Jurby commenced, the station was re-designated as the No. 5 Bombing and Gunnery School and saw the arrival of various aircraft to undertake the training sorties such as the Bristol Blenheims and Armstrong Whitworth Whitleys which would undertake their practice missions on the ranges operated by RAF Jurby Head.

=== Post World War II ===
Following the end of the Second World War the RAF began its post-war period of contraction, and on 17 September 1946, No. 5 Air Navigation School moved out from RAF Jurby and transferred to RAF Topcliffe in Yorkshire. This was followed by the transfer of No. 11 Air Gunnery School following which most of the bombing and gunnery ranges were closed.

In the late 1940s RAF Jurby Head oversaw the use of a new air weapons range, which stretched along the shoreline 8 miles (13 km) from Bluepoint to Ballabane and 6 miles (9.7 km) out to sea. Bombing practices were carried out at sea with the use of dummy bombs, including inert nuclear weapons. From 1956 - 1965 the range was operated by personnel from 1243 Signals Unit, Royal Air Force.

Many weapon types were used at Jurby Head ranging in weight up to 1,000 lbs. The range was used during 1982 by Vulcan bombers of the RAF Waddington Wing, comprising aircraft from Nos 44, 50 and 101 Squadrons, as part of their practice bombing sorties for Operation Black Buck.

The main user of the range was the United States Air Force (USAF), but the RAF and other NATO air forces used the range regularly. In addition the range was also used in the 1950s by personnel of 515 (Isle of Man) L.A.A. Royal Artillery (T.A.) for training exercises with 40mm Bofors guns.

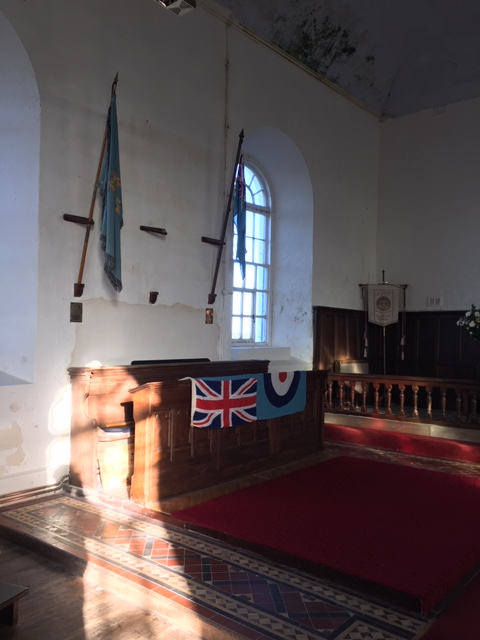
Station ensigns from RAF Jurby Head and RAF Jurby; St. Patrick's Church, Jurby

=== Closure ===
With the ending of the Cold War and the subsequent reduction of USAF operations in Europe the requirement for RAF Jurby Head reduced significantly and the station closed on 6 July 1993. At the time it was the smallest RAF station in the British Isles, staffed by eight military and two civilian personnel.

During the latter lifetime of its operation RAF Jurby Head became the focus of protest from the Isle of Man Branch of the Celtic League. Today the area of the bombing range is still a source of concern regarding environmental issues. Ordnance periodically continues to be washed ashore onto adjacent beaches or brought up in fishing nets.

== See also ==
- RAF Jurby, a nearby RAF station
- RAF Andreas
