= John Lewin (Manx author) =

Manx author

John Lewin is the author of a number of Manx carvals in the early 19th Century which advocated temperance.

He was a sumner (church warden of official) in Jurby, Isle of Man, during the 1830s, but other than this there is little biographical information available. There are four extant poems that are attributed to him, all of which were collected as folk songs at the end of the 19th century.

Lewin’s ‘My Chaarjyn, Gow Shiu Tastey’ (‘My Friends, Take You Notice’) was composed sometime around 1836 and concerns the dangers of excessive alcohol. (It has also been known by another title, ‘Carval er Feeyn as Jough’ (‘Carol on Wine and Strong Drink’)). Although subsequently taken up by the Manx abstinence movement, the carval (a form of carol in Manx) clearly states that it is not alcohol which is a sin, but its abuse by those who drink to excess.

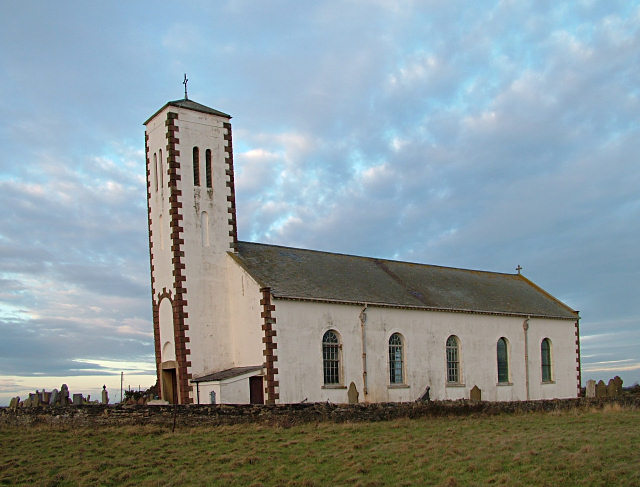
Jurby Church, Isle of Man

My Chaarjyn, Gow Shiu Tastey / My Friends, Take You Notice [extract]
Messyn theihll va palchey Dy arroo, ooil as feeyn Kairit er son cloan deiney Dy yannoo magh nyn veme Cha nee son scooyr ny meshtallys Cha moo son peccah erbee Agh baarail ad dy cairagh Myr te soit ayns goo Yee (...) Kys sloys dhyts gra, O ghooinney D’el peccah ayns jough ny feeyn (...) Nagh abbyr shiu ny sodjey Ta peccah ayns yn stoo Agh ayns ny creeghyn ocsyn Ta jannoo drogh-ymmyd jeu	The fruits of the world were a-plenty Of corn, oil and wine Intended for the issue of men To make out their needs It’s not for intoxication or drunkenness Nor yet for any sin But expending them carefully As is set down in the word of God (...) How dare you say, O man That there is sin in [strong] drink and wine (...) Don’t say any more That there is sin present in the stuff But in the hearts of those Who abuse it

A melody for this carval, entitled ‘Lewin’s ‘Total’ Hymn’, was collected by the Manx folk music collector, W. H. Gill, on Saturday August 3, 1895, from a John Kissack at Ballacurrey Cottage, Jurby.

In c. 1845, Lewin composed ‘Pingyn Yn Ommidan’ (‘The Fool’s Pence’) with Evan Christian of Lewaigue, Maughold. This was a 24 verse carval on the same temperance theme, although this time concerning the story of an individual man whose life was wrecked through alcoholism. A prose version of the story also exists.

Lewin is attributed with having written two other carvals, ‘Yn Ven-Ainshtyr Dewil’ (‘The Cruel Mistress’) and ‘Yn Chenn Dolphin’ (‘The Old Dolphin’). The former tells the tale of a man whose female employer falls in love with him, but in retribution for his rejection of her, she plants a ring in his pocket and denounces him as a thief. The latter concerns a group of Manx fishermen surviving a storm and reporting back to the owners of their boat.
