= Jonathan Levin =

Jonathan Levin may refer to:

- Jonathan Levin (economist) (born 1972), American economist and 13th president of Stanford University
- Jonathan Levin (footballer) (born 1993), Mexican footballer
- Jonathan Levin (teacher), son of Gerald M. Levin, murdered by one of his students
- Jon Levin (born 1966), guitarist
- Jonny Levin, character in List of Invisible Detective characters

== See also ==
- Jonathan Levine (disambiguation)
