= St Patrick's Church, Jurby =

Church in Jurby, Isle of Man

Coordinates: 54.3550°N 4.5411°W

St Patrick's Church
- St Patrick's Church, Jurby, Isle of Man

- Location: Jurby, Isle of Man
- Country: Isle of Man
- Denomination: Church of England

History
- Dedicated: 1829

Architecture
- Years built: 1813 – 1829

Administration
- Diocese: Diocese of Sodor and Man

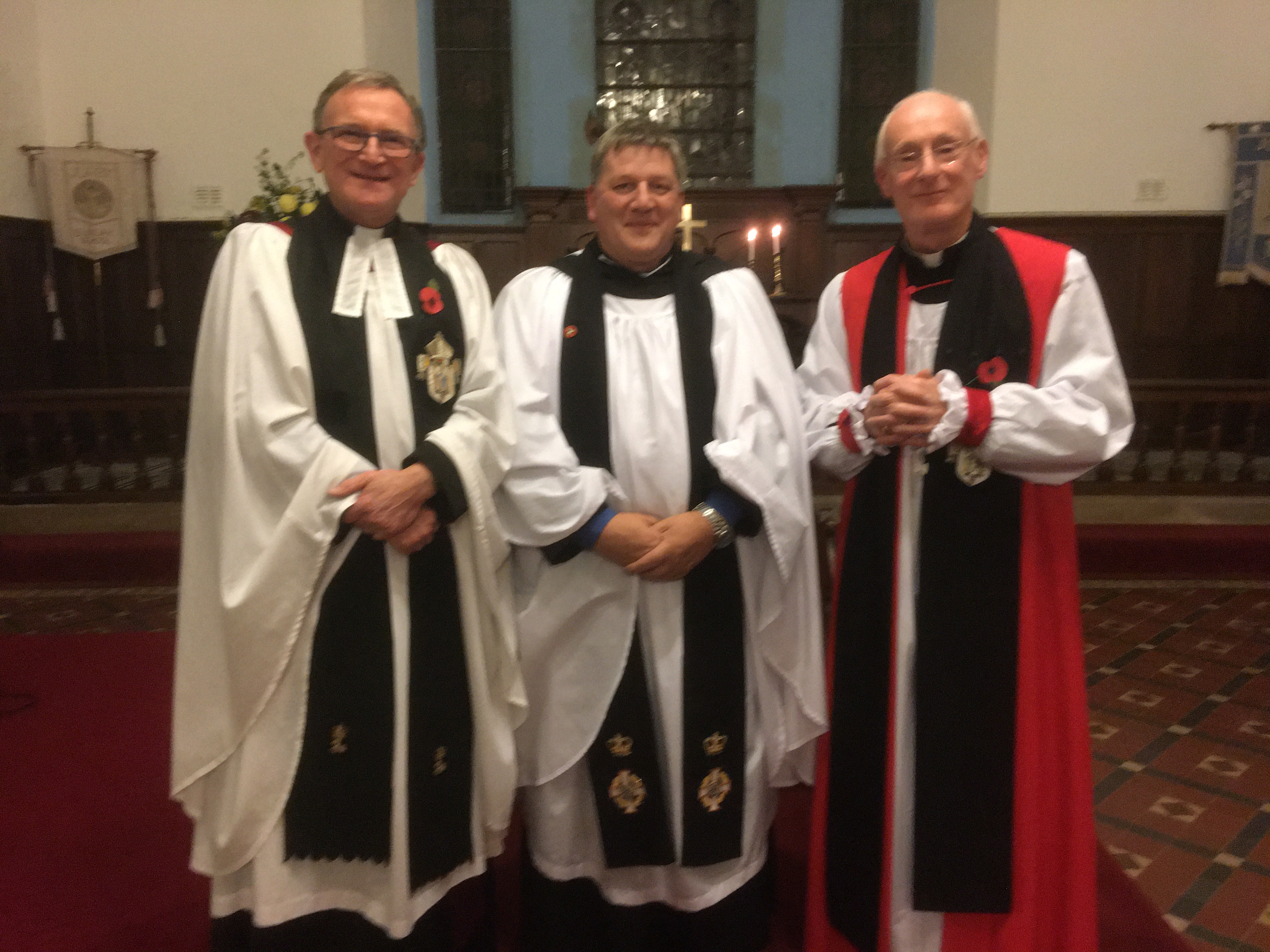
Archdeacon Andie Brown, the Rev. William Mackay, Bishop Peter Eagles

St Patrick's Church is a parish church of the Church of England in Jurby parish, near the northwest coast of the Isle of Man. Scotland and Ireland can be seen across the Irish Sea on a moderately clear day. The church also has views down the west coast to Peel, across the northern plain of the island, and to the central hills.

== History ==
A small 8th-century chapel (or Keeil) a few hundred yards to the south-west was Jurby's first recorded church. In medieval times the church was part of the Whithorn diocese in south-western Scotland. At one point while the English and Scots were at war, the local bishop invited the Scottish clergy of Jurby to visit him. The bishop was criticised by English authorities for fraternising with the enemy. The medieval church was built in the 12th century, which replaced the chapel.

On 12 June 1812 the parishioners successfully petitioned the Crown to replace their small church with a larger one. The church was to consist of pews separated by a central aisle, 36 pews on either side, each pew to hold eight individuals. Ground was broken on the new church, which would become the present-day St Patrick's, in 1813, and the structure was finally completed in 1829. There are several Viking carved crosses/gravestones within the church, including the Sigurd Cross. The churchyard contains a Norse burial mound.

During 2023 two ancient Manx crosses, thought to date from 1,000 AD, were unearthed at St Patrick's. In the wake of a winter storm in 2022, it was noticed that part of a wall had collapsed near to the ancient viking burial mound. Initially a large piece of carved slate was uncovered which in turn led to a visit to the site by a Manx National Heritage officer. It is believed that the crosses were broken up when the 'new' chapel was constructed in the early 19th Century, the stone being re-cycled to form the perimeter wall of the current burial ground. It is understood that another two or three of such crosses have been recovered from the wall during the last two centuries.

The church is located on slightly raised ground, with views across the Irish Sea to both Ireland and Scotland, south-west towards Peel, towards the northern plain of the island, as well as to the central hills.

There are a number of war graves, for British, Commonwealth and Polish servicemen. Many of these died at the nearby RAF Jurby training base during World War II, as did many members of the SOE, also based in Jurby. A notable gravestone is that of Howard Pixton, a racing pilot and test pilot who won the 1914 Schneider Trophy seaplane contest for Britain.

As part of a new initiative for Jurby, the Rev'd William Mackay (formerly curate of the Parish of the Northern Plain) was installed as Minister to Jurby Church and Community by the Lord Bishop, at a service held on Friday 8 November 2019, in Jurby Church. (Under a Bishop's Mission Order, Jurby is effectively no longer part of the Parish of the Northern Plain.) Rev. Mackay's first service in his new role was to conduct the Remembrance Service in St Patrick's, Jurby on 10 November 2019.

== Gallery ==
St Patrick's Church, Jurby
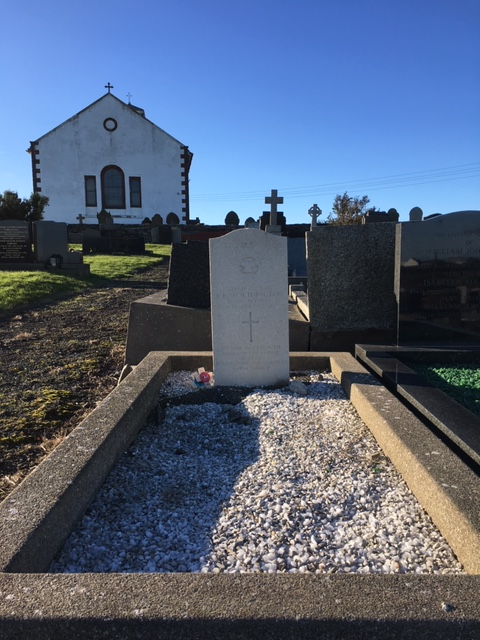
The grave of RAF Jurby Station Commander; Group Captain Francis Worthington

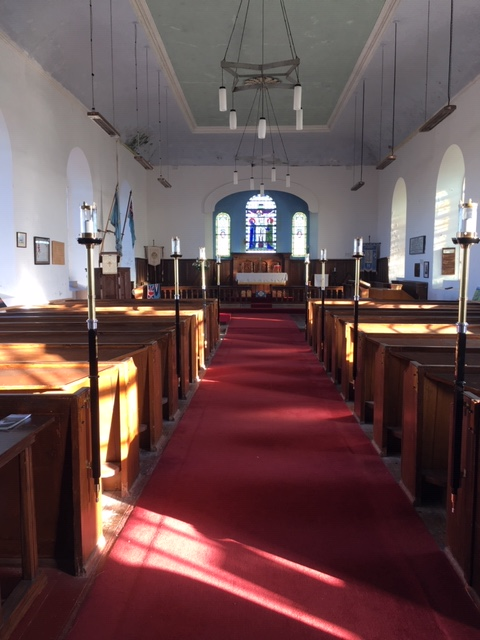
View towards the altar in St Patrick's Church

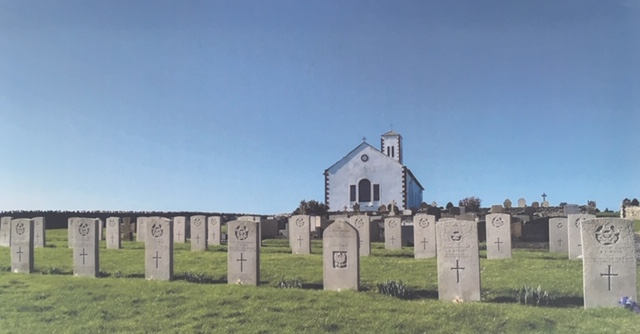
Some of the military graves of service personnel based at RAF Jurby

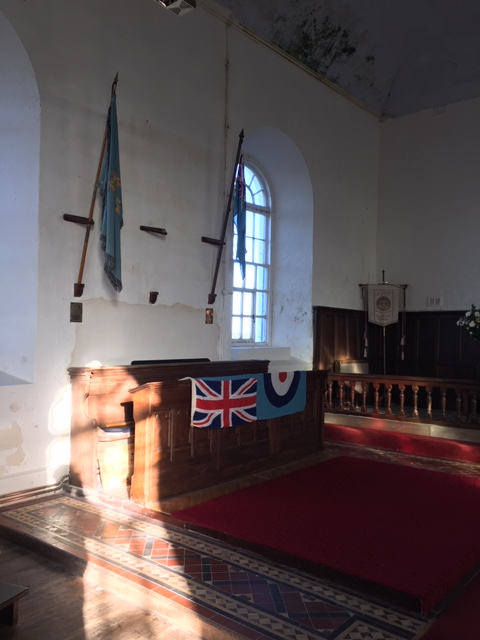
The ensigns of RAF Jurby and RAF Jurby Head

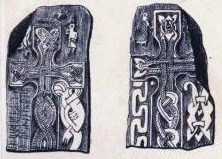
One of the Viking Crosses (J. G. Cumming, 1857)

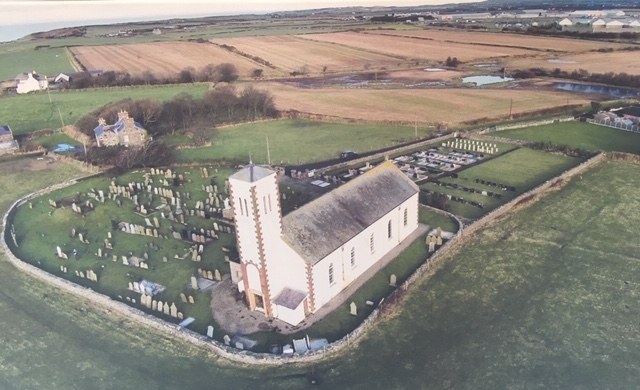
Aerial view of St Patrick's Church, Jurby

== See also ==
- Diocese of Sodor and Man
- Bishop of Sodor and Man
- Pasages (steam trawler)
