= No. 2778 Squadron RAF Regiment =

Airfield defence squadron of the Royal Air Force

No. 2278 Squadron, Royal Air Force Regiment was an airfield defence squadron of the Royal Air Force.

== Formation ==
The squadron was formed as No 778 (Ground Defence) Squadron at RAF Jurby, Isle of Man on 19 December 1941, having been unnumbered from the previous April. On 1 February 1942 all RAF Regiment Squadrons had 2,000 added to their numbers thus the squadron was re-designated No. 2778 Squadron Royal Air Force Regiment.

== Service ==
No. 2778 Squadron remained at Jurby until it moved to RAF Manston in 1942. It converted to the Light Anti Aircraft role in May 1943. During the anti-Diver operations of 1944 it was based at Maidstone.

== Disbandment ==
No. 2778 Squadron was disbanded in May 1945.

== See also ==
- List of RAF Regiment units
- List of Battle of Britain squadrons
- List of Royal Air Force units & establishments
