= Jurby =

Parish on the Isle of Man

Coordinates: 54°21′30″N 4°30′40″W

Jurby: Manx: Skeerey Jorby
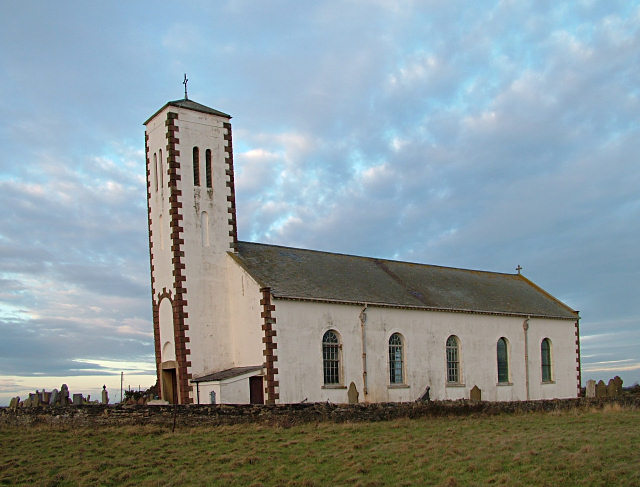
- St. Patrick's Church, Jurby

- Parish of Jurby, Isle of Man
- Population: 776
- OS grid reference: SC3702298134
- Sheading: Michael
- Crown dependency: Isle of Man
- Post town: ISLE OF MAN
- Postcode district: IM7
- House of Keys: Ayre & Michael

Jurby (Old Norse: djúra-bý – deer settlement - animal park) (locally /ˈdʒərbiː/) is one of the seventeen parishes of the Isle of Man. It is located in the north-west of the island (part of the traditional North Side division) in the sheading of Michael.

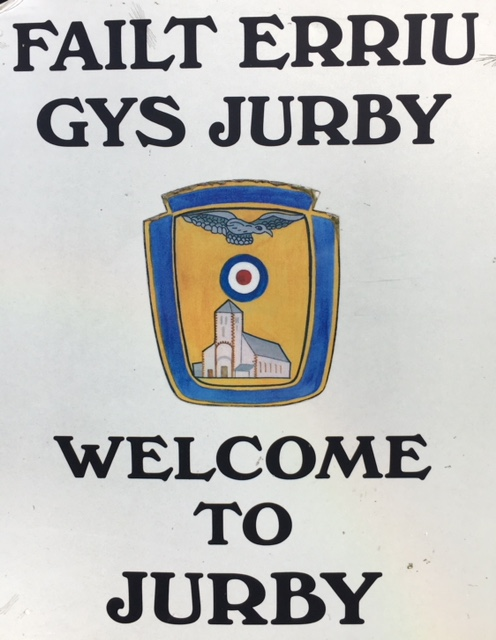
Jurby Parish sign, illustrating the close ties between the parish and the Royal Air Force

Jurby has the same meaning as Derby, both originating from the Scandinavian term for a deer farm or park; 'djúra-bý.' The earliest known reference to Jurby comes from 1291, when it appears as 'Dureby,' but by 1588 it had morphed into being today's Jurby. The introduction of Derby as a placename in the Isle of Man came much later, such as with the appearance of Derbyhaven in 1507, when it came from the surname of the then Lords of Man.

== Local government ==
For the purposes of local government, the whole of the historic parish forms a single parish district with Commissioners.

The Captain of the Parish (since 1999) is John James Quayle.

== Politics ==
Jurby parish is part of the Ayre & Michael constituency, which elects two Members to the House of Keys. Before 2016 it was in the Michael constituency.

== Demographics ==
The Isle of Man census of 2021 returned a parish population of 780, an increase of 0.5% from the figure of 776 in 2016, but a decrease of 2.2% from the figure of 797 in 2011. According to the 2011 Isle of Man census, 3.5% of Jurby residents reported that they could speak, read or write in the Manx language.

Jurby (census)
Year	1996	2001	2006	2011	2016	2021
Pop.	624	677	659	797	776	780
±%	—	+8.5%	−2.7%	+20.9%	−2.6%	+0.5%

== Geography ==
The parish of Jurby, which lies on the north-western coast of the island, borders those of Andreas to the east, Lezayre to the south-east, and Ballaugh to the south. It is low-lying overall: the highest elevations are some coastal dunes with a height of up to 39 metres.

There is an industrial park on the old RAF Jurby Airfield.

== Landmarks ==
=== Airfield ===
Jurby Airfield was originally used as a Royal Air Force training base in World War II. During the 1950s it was used as a training camp for Officer cadets on short-term commissions in the RAF. The course lasted three months. Part of the airfield is now used as an industrial and retail estate. The old runways and taxiways now form the Jurby motorcycle race track.

The grassland surrounding the airfield harbours many wildflowers, as the land has never been ploughed. Skylarks can be heard in summer when there are no races on. A large part of the airfield therefore has statutory protection under the Wildlife Act 1990 as an Area of Special Scientific Importance.

=== Museums ===
A museum dedicated to transport in the island, the Jurby Transport Museum, is housed in an old aircraft hangar.

Another museum nearby, the Isle of Man Motor Museum, was officially opened by the Lieutenant Governor on 22 May 2015.

=== Church ===
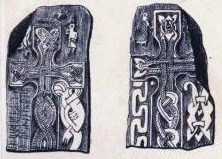
Viking carved cross at Jurby.

A tiny 8th century chapel dedicated to St Cecilia (the patron saint of music), was Jurby's first recorded church. St Cecilia's Day on 22 November was the parish festival day. There are several Viking carved crosses and gravestones within the church. Medieval objects have occasionally been excavated when new graves were prepared in the church grounds.

In medieval times the church was part of the Whithorn diocese in South West Scotland. This caused some political trouble when the English and Scots were at war; the Bishop invited the Scottish clergy of Jurby to visit him and was criticised by English authorities for fraternising with the enemy.

The present St. Patrick's Church, Jurby was built during the war with help of RAF Jurby. There are a number of war graves, for British, Commonwealth and Polish servicemen. They died mostly from aircraft training accidents.

The church is set on a slight headland on the coast and there are views south to Peel, north to Scotland, and inland across the rural north of the island, towards the hills.

=== Prison ===
The Isle of Man Prison operated by the Isle of Man Prison Service is located at Jurby.

== Treens ==
Jurby was historically subdivided into five treens:

1. Sertfell
2. Knoksewell
3. Dalyott
4. Slekby
5. Le Soulby

== See also ==
- RAF Jurby Head, an offshore air weapons range operational between 1939 and 1993

== Gallery ==
St. Patrick's Church

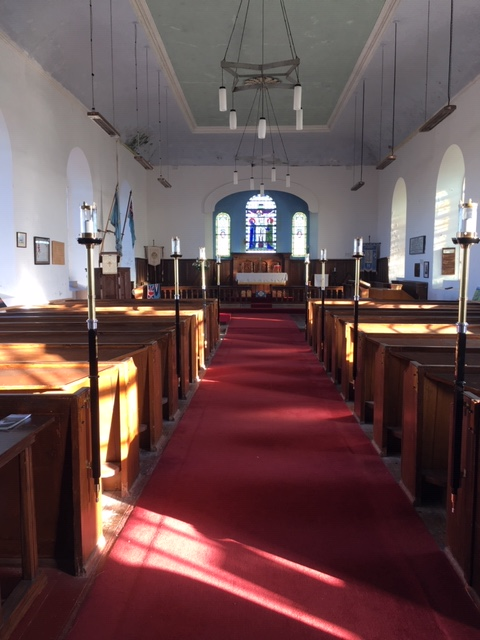
Interior of St. Patrick's Church

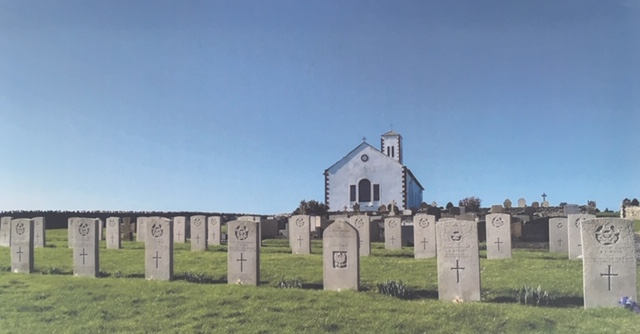
St. Patrick's Church and graveyard

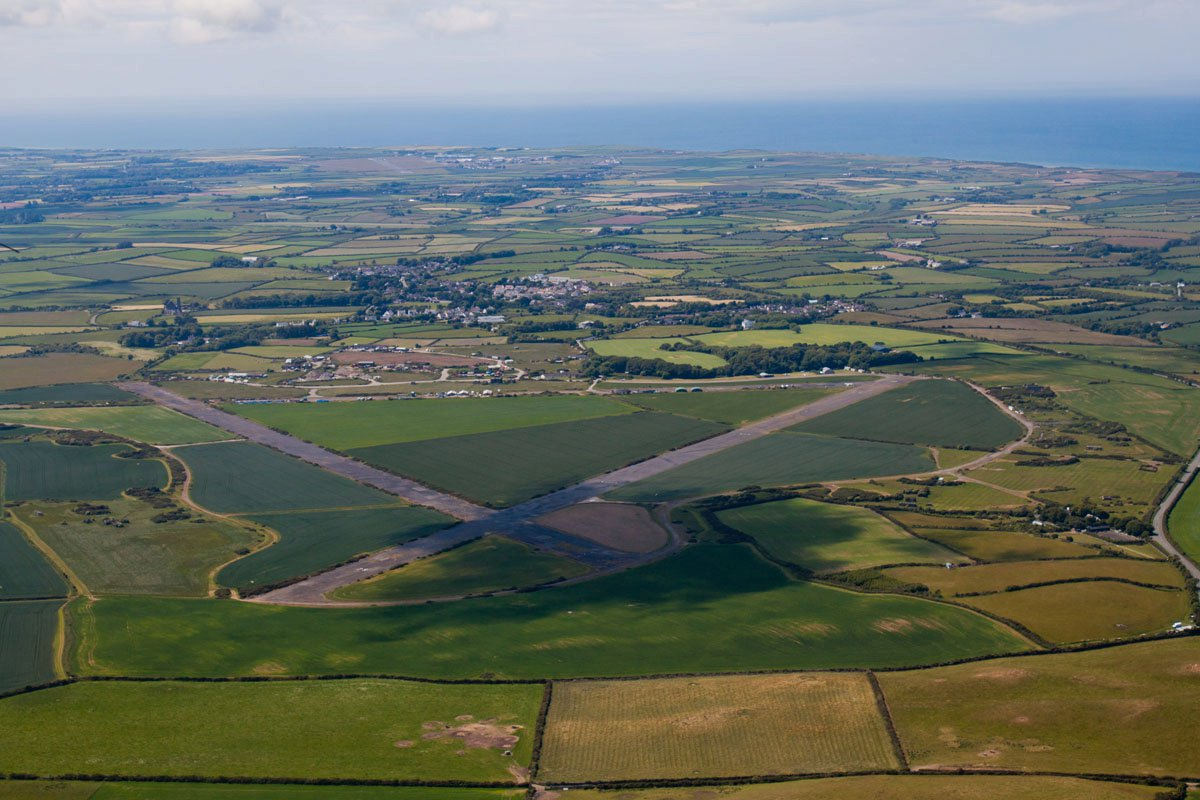
Aerial view of the Airfield with Jurby visible in the distance.

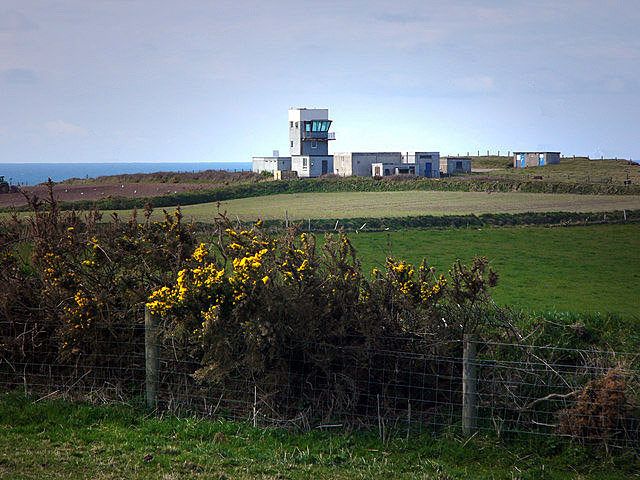
RAF Jurby Head

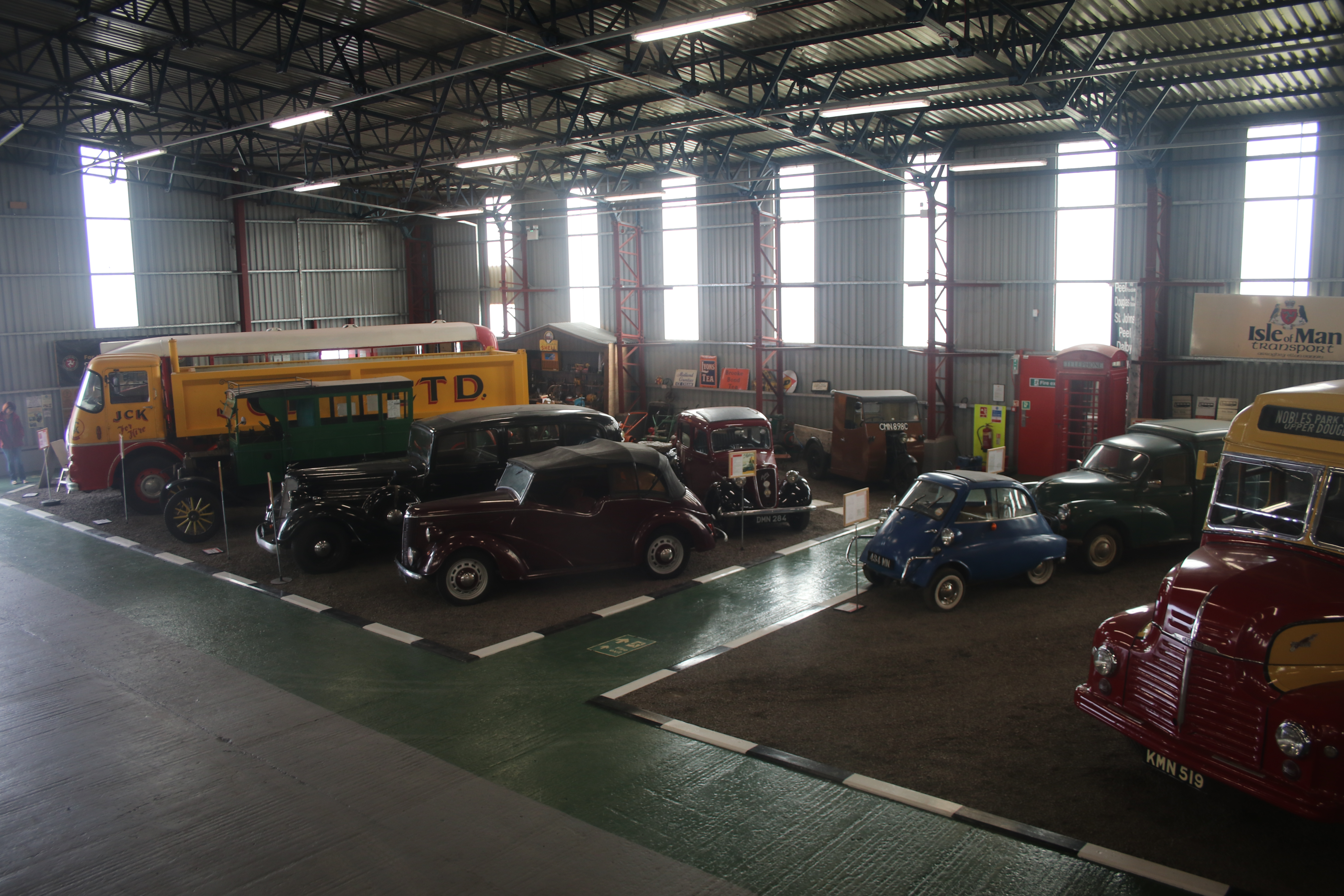
Interior of Jurby Transport Museum
