= List of lighthouses in the Isle of Man =

Isle of Man and Calf of Man Lighthouses Act 1815
- Act of Parliament
- Parliament of the United Kingdom
- Long title: An Act for enabling the Commissioners of the Northern Light Houses to erect Light Houses on the Isles of Man and Calf of Man.
- Citation: 55 Geo. 3. c. lxvii

Dates
- Royal assent: 7 June 1815

Other legislation
- Repealed by: Merchant Shipping Repeal Act 1854

Status: Repealed

Text of statute as originally enacted

This is a list of lighthouses in the Isle of Man which is located in the Irish Sea between England and Ireland.

The Commissioners of Northern Lights were granted powers by the Isle of Man and Calf of Man Lighthouses Act 1815 (55 Geo. 3. c. lxvii) to erect lighthouses on the Isle of Man.

== Lighthouses ==
Name	Image	Location coordinates	Year built	Tower height	Focal height	Range	Notes
Calf of Man (low)		Calf of Man; 54°03.157′N 4°49.734′W	1815	15 m (49 ft)	86 m (282 ft)	Inactive	Designed by Robert Stevenson. Inactive since 1875
Calf of Man (high)		Calf of Man; 54°03.180′N 4°49.715′W	1815/1968	18 m (59 ft)	93 m (305 ft)	Inactive	Designed by Robert Stevenson. Inactive since 2007
Castletown Harbour: Irish Quay		Castletown; 54.0724°N 4.6499°W	1944	3.5 m (11 ft)	5 m (16 ft)	5 nmi (9 km)	Operated by Isle of Man Harbours
Castletown Harbour: New Pier		Castletown; 54.0724°N 4.6499°W	1849	7 m (23 ft)	8 m (26 ft)	5 nmi (9 km)	Operated by Isle of Man Harbours
Chicken Rock		Chicken Rock; 54°02.271′N 4°50.315′W	1875	44 m (144 ft)	38 m (125 ft)	21 nmi (39 km)	Designed by David & Thomas Stevenson
Douglas Head		Douglas Head; 54°08.599′N 4°27.947′W	1857	20 m (66 ft)	32 m (105 ft)	24 nmi (44 km)	Designed by David & Thomas Stevenson
Langness		Dreswick Point; 54°03′14″N 4°37′30″W	1880	19 m (62 ft)	23 m (75 ft)	12 nmi (22 km)	Designed by David & Thomas Stevenson
Maughold Head		Maughold Head; 54°17.734′N 4°18.585′W	1914	23 m (75 ft)	65 m (213 ft)	21 nmi (39 km)	Designed by Charles Stevenson
Point of Ayre		Point of Ayre; 54°24.959′N 4°22.111′W	1818	30 m (98 ft)	32 m (105 ft)	19 nmi (35 km)	Designed by Robert Stevenson
Point of Ayre Winkie		Point of Ayre; 54°24.959′N 4°22.111′W	1888	10 m (33 ft)	10 m (33 ft)	Inactive	Inactive since 2010
Port Erin Range Front		Port Erin; 54.0872°N 4.7594°W	Unknown	11 m (36 ft)	10 m (33 ft)	5 nmi (9 km)	Operated by Isle of Man Harbours
Thousla Rock		Calf Sound; 54.06215°N 4.80065°W	1981	9 m (30 ft)	9 m (30 ft)	4 nmi (7 km)	Octagonal pillar, displays a flashing red light.

== See also ==
- Registered Buildings and Conservations Areas of the Isle of Man
- List of Northern Lighthouse Board lighthouses
- List of lighthouses in the United Kingdom
- Lists of lighthouses and lightvessels
