= Maughold Head Lighthouse =

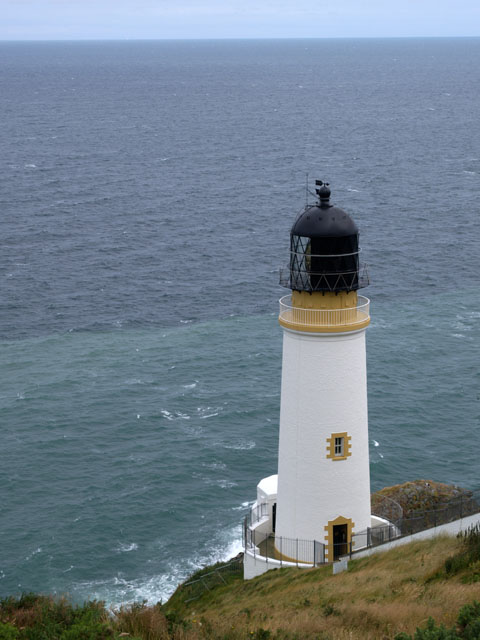
- Maughold Head Lighthouse
- Location: Maughold Head; Isle of Man
- Coordinates: 54.295749°N 4.309419°W

Tower
- Constructed: 1914
- Construction: masonry
- Automated: 1993
- Height: 23 metres (75 ft)
- Shape: cylindrical tower with balcony and lantern
- Markings: white tower, black lantern, ochre trim
- Power source: mains electricity
- Operator: Northern Lighthouse Board
- Heritage: registered building
- Fog signal: one blast every 90s. deactivated in 1987

Light
- Focal height: 65 metres (213 ft)
- Lens: Fresnel lens
- Range: 15 nautical miles (28 km; 17 mi)
- Characteristic: Fl (3) W 30s.

Maughold Head Lighthouse is an active 20th century lighthouse, located on the headland of the same name at the southern end of Ramsey Bay on the eastern coast of the Isle of Man. Completed in 1914, it was designed by David A and Charles Stevenson.

== History ==
Following a complaint by the shipping owner Lord Inverclyde that a number of ships had foundered as a result of poor maritime signalling near the Whitestone Bank, and that a fog signal should be built at Maughold Head, the need for a new lighthouse was raised in 1909 by the Commissioners of Northern Light Houses. Trinity House stated that there was already a fog and light signal established on the Bahama Bank Lightship nearby. But after further discussion, and with the support of the Board of Trade they approved the works for a lightstation to be built on Maughold Head.

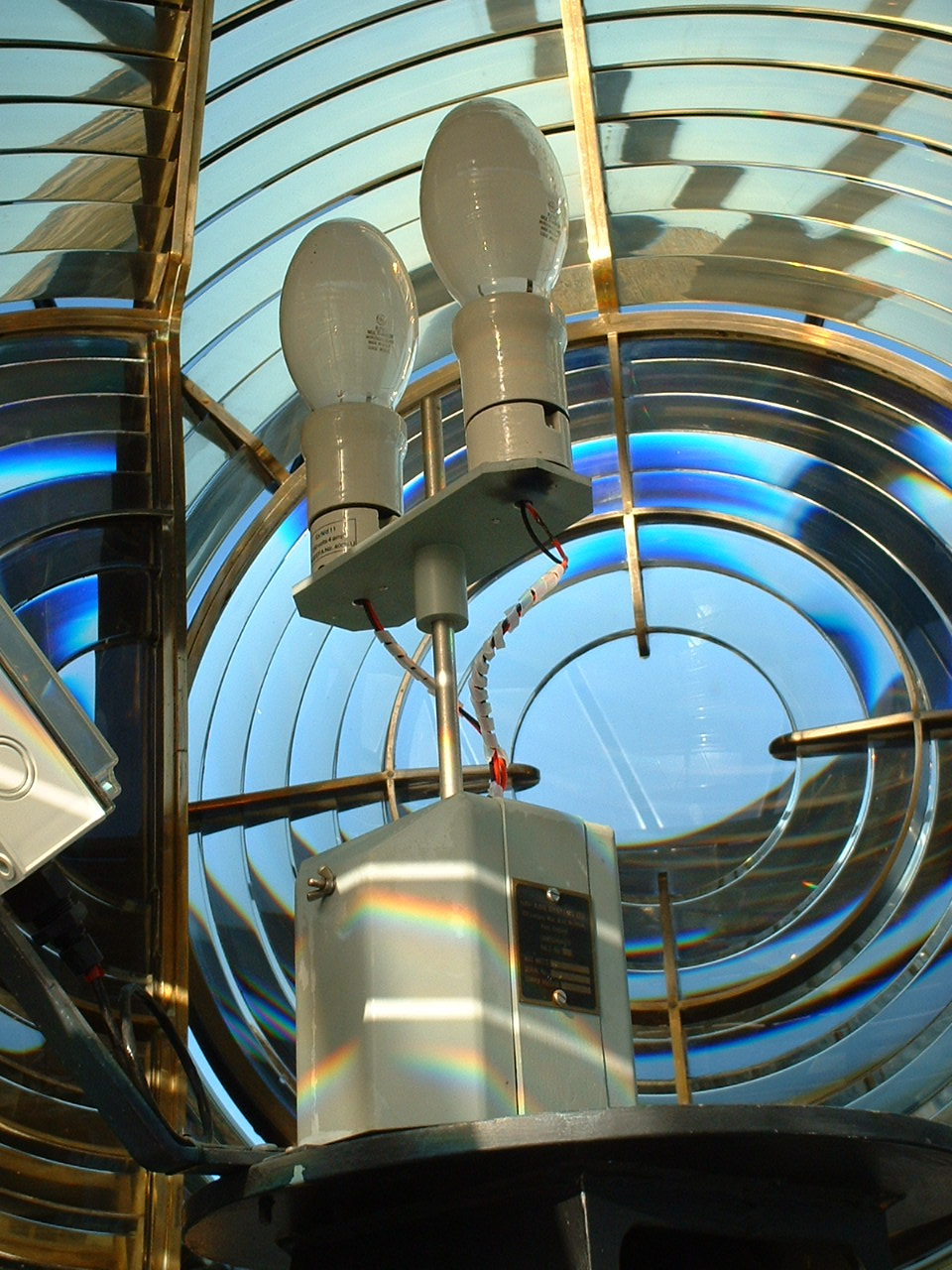
Fresnel lens and lamp changer at Maughold Head

Designed by Charles and David, two brothers from the notable Stevenson lighthouse engineering family, it consists of a 23 metre high masonry tower, with the lighthouse keepers accommodation built on the headland above at the same level as the lantern. A set of 127 steps links the tower to the keeper's cottage. The optic was supplied by Chance Brothers of Smethwick, the fog signal and other ancillary equipment by Dove & Co of Edinburgh. The 1st order Fresnel lens is still in use.

Maughold Head Lighthouse became operational on 15 April 1914, and the Bahama Bank Lightship was subsequently taken out of service.

With a focal height of 65 metres (213 ft) above the sea, the light has a nominal range of 15 nautical miles, and has a characteristic of three flashes of white light every thirty seconds. The fog signal, which formed the major part of justification for the station, produced a single blast every 90 seconds. It was deactivated in 1987.

Following automation in 1993, the former keeper's cottages were converted into bed and breakfast holiday accommodation, they were later sold in 2014 for a guide price of £600,000, selling for a finalised sum of £500,000.

The light and tower continues to be maintained by the Northern Lighthouse Board, and is registered under the international Admiralty number A4786 and has the NGA identifier of 114–5036.

== See also ==
- List of lighthouses in the Isle of Man
- List of Northern Lighthouse Board lighthouses
