= SS Rose Ann =

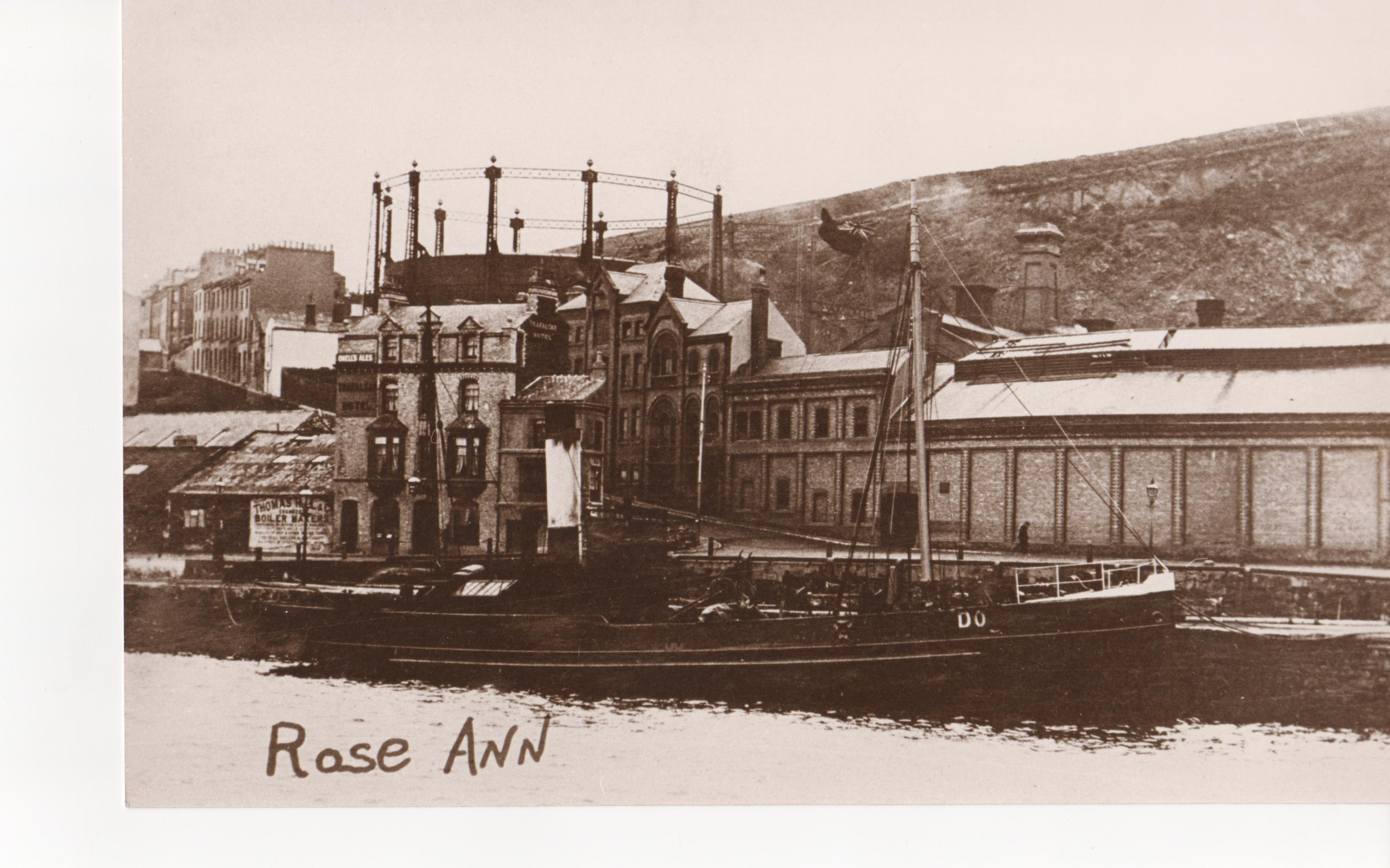
- Rose Ann berthed alongside The Tongue, Douglas Harbour, Isle of Man.

History
- Name: Rose Ann
- Owner: 1879 -1890 James O’Brien; 1890 - 1891 Isabella Mac Callum; 1891 - 1895 G. Nicholson and J. Thompson; 1895 - 1915 R. Knox; 1916 - 1916 H. Grayson; 1916 - 1918 The General Trading Co. Ltd; 1918 - 1918 J. Hammond; 1918 - 1924 Central Trading Company.
- Operator: 1879 -1890 James O’Brien, Glasgow; 1890 - 1891 Isabella Mac Callum, Glasgow; 1891 - 1895 G. Nicholson and J. Thompson, Liverpool; 1895 - 1915 R. Knox, Douglas; 1916 - 1916 H. Grayson, Liverpool; 1916 - 1918 The General Trading Co. Ltd, Douglas; 1918 - 1918 J. Hammond, London; 1918 - 1924 Central Trading Company, Hull.
- Port of registry: 1879 - 1891 Glasgow; 1891 - 1892 Liverpool; 1892 - 1924 Douglas
- Builder: H. M. McIntyre, Paisley
- Yard number: 31
- Launched: 13 March 1879
- In service: 1879
- Out of service: 1924
- Identification: 80453
- Fate: Scrapped

General characteristics Rose Ann
- Type: 1879 - 1895 Steam Lighter; 1895 - 1915 Steam Trawler; 1915 - Coastal trading vessel
- Tonnage: 130 gross register tons (GRT)
- Length: 105 ft (32.0 m)
- Beam: 19 ft (5.8 m)
- Depth: 9 ft (2.7 m)
- Installed power: 96 shp (72 kW)
- Propulsion: 2 x 2-cyl by Hutson & Corbett, Kelvinhaugh, Glasgow.
- Speed: Approximately 12 knots
- Capacity: 125 tons of cargo (following 1915 conversion)
- Crew: 8

SS Rose Ann was built by H. M. McIntyre, Paisley, in 1879, and was constructed as a steam lighter. She was registered in Glasgow operating for James O’Brien. The Rose Ann was 105 ft long, with a beam of 19 ft, a 9 ft draught and was powered by two engines developing 48 horsepower aside (a total of 96 shp (72 kW). The Rose Ann was 130 tons.

== Service life ==
In 1890 she was sold to Isabella Mac Callum and then in 1891 to George Nicholson and John Thompson, Liverpool. Following their purchase the vessel was re-registered at the Port of Liverpool. Her Liverpool registry was closed in August 1892 when she was re-registered in Douglas, Isle of Man.

Following the loss of the Albatross, she was bought by Robert Knox of Douglas in 1895. She was converted to a steam trawler and given the designation DO241. The Rose Ann replaced the Albatross, which whilst trawling with the Lady Loch on the Bahama Bank in the early hours of Tuesday 6 November 1894, was run down and sunk by the passenger steamer Duke of Clarence, which was owned by the London & North-western and Lancashire & Yorkshire Railway Company and operated a schedule between Fleetwood and Belfast.

As a result of the collision, five of the crew of the Albatross were lost, out of a total crew of eight. The crew members were: Henry Hudson of South Quay, Douglas, Isle of Man; Richard Gregg originally from Liverpool but who had lived for many years at Well Rd, Douglas; William Daugherty and John Leadbeater, both of Douglas, and Charles Shimmin who was the son of the skipper of the Lady Loch and lived with his parents in Big Well St, Douglas.

The Rose Ann was purchased in Liverpool and the three surviving crew members were all given positions. Edward "Princey" Shimmin was given command, Robert Kelly was appointed second engineer and Thomas Turner was taken on as a deck hand.

In June 1895 she was hired by the Liverpool Marine Biology Committee for research into the fauna of Liverpool Bay and neighbouring seas. She dredged to the west and north-west of Peel and Ballaugh on the North Bank to depths of up to 20 fathoms.

Rose Ann undertook further work in October of that year when she dredged off Port Erin and along the south-eastern side of the Island, from the Calf of Man to Langness at depths of between 15 and 20 fathoms.

She operated two sets of trawling gear which could be worked independently of each other and in terms of size was similar to the Albatross.

When the Port St Mary Fish Company commenced trading, she was the first vessel chartered to transport fish between their Irish Station and Milford Haven.

In 1897 Knox mortgaged her to a gentleman named Henry Gordon of Onchan for the sum of £250 (equivalent to £35,830 in 2023) at an interest rate of 4%. She was mortgaged again in 1898, this time to Dumbell's Bank for a sum of £1,700 at a rate of 6% (equivalent to £239,196 in 2023).

On 4 November 1899, during a southerly gale, she picked up the Norwegian barque Cordillera, which had broken away from the tugs Knight of St George and Prairie Cock off the Point of Ayre and had been carried into the Solway Firth. The Prairie Cock subsequently arrived on the scene at which time the tow was transferred. Later, the Knight of St George again made contact. The two tugs together with the Rose Ann standing by, then proceeded into Ramsey Bay and were docked at Ramsey on the 6th. Through the court the owners of the Rose Ann were awarded £300 (equivalent to £42,656 in 2023).

In March 1900 probate was granted to Edward Gordon of Bembridge, Isle of Wight and Rachael Gordon of Onchan in respect of the mortgage of the vessel to the late Henry Gordon and by May 1901 the mortgage to Dumbell's had been discharged. In April 1901 Knox then mortgaged the vessel again, this time to Horace Lightfoot of Douglas for the sum of £500 (equivalent to £68,565 in 2023) at 5% interest. In February 1902 Knox discharged the mortgage which he had taken out with Henry Gordon.

The third mortgage which Knox had taken out on the vessel, with Horace Lightfoot, was discharged in July 1914. In May 1915 Knox then mortgaged her again, this time to the Lancashire & Yorkshire Bank Ltd, Manchester.

In early 1915 the Rose Ann underwent alterations in order to fit her out as a cargo boat with a capacity for 125 tons of cargo. Following her alterations, she was put up for sale as such by public auction on Tuesday 13 July 1915 in the Farmer's Clubroom, British Hotel, together with the Lady Loch.

Rose Ann was bought by Capt. Richard Phillips, who described himself as a ‘London shipmaster’ for £825 (equivalent to £83,505 in 2023) although the reserve price had been between £950 and £1,000. Upon purchase it is understood that Capt. Phillips was to send her to Australia.

However, the full sum of money was not paid, and the matter was brought before the High Court at Douglas on Wednesday 26 January 1916. Robert Knox brought the action against Richard Phillips on the matter of £250 (equivalent to £21,411 in 2023) outstanding. It turned out that Phillips was an Australian without a permanent address and who had given his address at the time of purchase as the Hotel Metropole, London.

Although the Rose Ann was still registered in Douglas, the Customs could not grant an ordinary Chancery arrest, as they also had to uphold Phillips’ interest in the vessel, although Phillips was not present at court, citing an inability to travel because he was engaged in war service in the transport service of the Australian Authorities. The case was adjourned and the court next sat to on 9 February, again without Phillips being present. The court found in favour of Knox and the balance of shares in the Rose Ann was offered for sale by the Coroner of Middle on 17 March. Two sales of the vessel followed in quick succession. She was sold to Henry Grayson of Liverpool in April 1916 and then sold to the General Trading Co. Ltd, Douglas in June 1916.

Her crew were witness to the ketch Gladys during her ill-fated passage to Douglas in October 1916.

In early 1918 another series of sales in quick succession followed. The Rose Ann was sold to John Hammond of London on 5 January and then sold to The Premier Tug Co. Ltd, Hull, on 7 January.

Further information then becomes sketchy (perhaps because of World War I); however, she appears in a further sale being sold for the sum of £6,000 (equivalent to £369,187 in 2023) by the Central Trading Company Birkenhead, in February 1918. This high price for a vessel, which by that time was approaching 40 years old, was attributed by the shortage of steamers as a consequence of the war. The price was considerably more than the £825 (equivalent to £83,505 in 2023) which had been realized in 1915.

== Disposal ==
Rose Ann continued in service for another six years, as the next information is her being sold in 1924 to the Dover Shipbreaking Company, Dover, for breaking up.

Her Douglas registry was closed on 21 March 1924.

== Incidents ==
Her skipper and owner appeared before Douglas Magistrates for verbally abusing the harbour master in 1894, and her skipper was charged, although acquitted, with trawling within the 3-mile limit in 1896.

In February 1906 tragedy struck on board when three members of the Rose Ann's crew died of suffocation. The Rose Ann was lying alongside The Tongue undergoing repairs and the three men; Robert Hughes, Thomas Watterson, and William Clucas – who were all from Peel – were found dead in their bunks in the forecastle. The investigation concluded that they’d lit the small stove in the cabin for warmth, and during the night the wind had changed with the result that the smoke had been blown back into the cabin. The door was closed tight and so there was no ventilation, with the result that the three men died from asphyxiation. A fund was set up and raised the total of £660 (equivalent to £89,670 in 2023) for the three widows and their children.
