= Bahama Bank Lightship =

Bahama Bank Lightvessel
History

Isle of Man
- In service: 1848
- Out of service: 1914

General characteristics
- Type: Lightvessel
- Bahama Bank
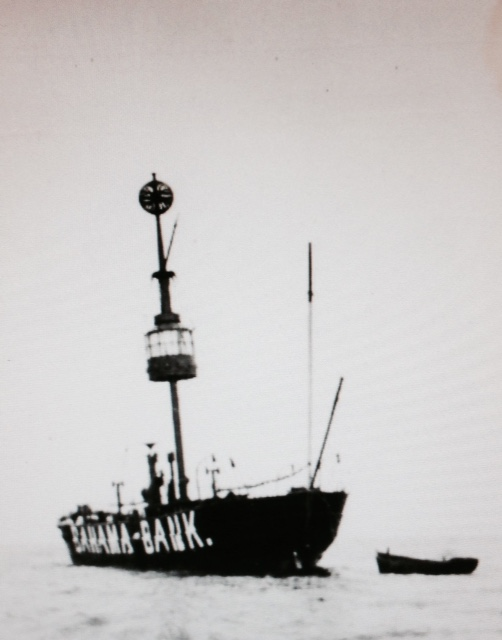
- Markings: Red (hull), Ball (masthead)
- Operator: Northern Lighthouse Board
- Fog signal: 1 blast every 2 minutes
- First lit: 1848
- Deactivated: May 1914
- Focal height: 12 m (39 ft)
- Range: 10 nmi (19 km; 12 mi)
- Characteristic: Gp Fl 30s

The Bahama Bank Lightship was a Lightvessel stationed on the Bahama Bank east of Ramsey Bay, Isle of Man.

== Service life ==
The original Lightvessel was stationed on the bank in 1848, its position being 1.25 nautical miles southeast of the southeast tail of the bank at position 54°19′N 4°12′W. The lightvessel's lighting consisted of two fixed lights with an operational coverage of 10 nautical miles. The original vessel was not fitted with a fog horn, instead a gun mounted onboard was fired during periods of low visibility as a warning to shipping.

A new vessel took station in September 1879 and incorporated one signal light which operated a white group flash every 30 seconds. The vessel's facilities were augmented in 1882 when a fog signal was fitted which consisted of one single blast every two minutes.

From its introduction into operation in 1848 the vessel's shore station was situated at Ramsey, Isle of Man. This lasted until 1877 when it was moved to Holyhead. On numerous occasions during the stormy winter months, the Trinity service boat carrying the relief crew would be unable to get alongside the light vessel. One such occasion was during January 1877 when the crew were left on board the light vessel for 17 days.

The light vessel was used on numerous occasions as a flag boat, marking a turning point for yacht racing at the annual Ramsey Regatta.

== Incidents ==
On Tuesday 16 October 1877, following an assistance signal being hoisted, the Ramsey Harbour boat Snider, was despatched to the light vessel. On reaching the vessel it was found that her Master, Captain Temple, had fractured several of his fingers during a storm the previous night.

== Decommissioning ==
After a meeting on 3 February 1909 concerning new works, the Board of Trade requested the observations of the Northern Lighthouse Commissioners on a suggestion that a fog horn be established on Maughold Head. The suggestion was put forward as a result of a complaint from Lord Inverclyde that the Whitestone Bank Light was often extinguished and on several occasions shipping had come to grief. There being no light between Point of Ayre and Douglas Head, it was advised that a light and fog signal would be of great assistance to shipping, but as the Commissioners had other proposed new works in progress it was decided that Maughold Head was not really urgent and would be included in the 1910-11 Estimates. On 26 August the statutory approval was sought from Trinity House, however Trinity House declined to give their approval as a fog siren and light were already established on the Bahama Bank 4 miles from Maughold Head. The matter was retained for discussion. Trinity House sanction was again sought and it was granted because the Board of Trade had given their approval.

Maughold Head Lighthouse was commissioned and was first lit on 15 April 1914. The withdrawal of the Bahama Bank Lightship was consequent on the establishment of the Maughold Head station.

Following its withdrawal, the lightvessel was replaced by a gas buoy.

== Radio Caroline ==
On 6 July 1964 the pirate radio ship MV Caroline took up position on the southern tip of the Bahama Bank, in the position formerly occupied by the lightship. Broadcasts began from the vessel which was known as Radio Caroline North and continued until 1968, when the MV Caroline was seized on 3 March 1968, and was taken under tow by the tug Utrecht which subsequently made passage to Amsterdam.
