= Bahama Bank =

Coordinates: 54.36667°N 4.25°W

- Location within the Isle of Man
- Crown dependency: Isle of Man

The Bahama Bank is a sand bank across Ramsey Bay, about 3 miles (2.6 nmi; 4.8 km) off the east coast of the Isle of Man 4 miles (3.5 nmi; 6.4 km) northeast of Maughold Head.

== Description ==
The bank extends from Northwest to Southeast, is 10 miles long and 1 mile broad. In the late 1840s the Bahama Bank Lightship was stationed on its Southeast end, in 11 fathoms, its light visible at the distance of 10 miles. Following the construction of the Maughold Head Lighthouse the Bahama Bank Lightship was decommissioned in 1914 and replaced by a buoy. The Bahama Bank was formerly a popular area for fishing within region of the Isle of Man.

During the course of the day a strong current setting in from the south, probably from the Atlantic Ocean, flows across the bank into the North Channel and thence back into the Atlantic. A water sample taken on the bank by Captain Temple of the Bahama Bank Lightship in January 1870 found its specific gravity when compared to distilled water, free from air and displaying the same temperature to be:

- At 0 degrees Celsius = 1.02721
- At 15 degrees Celsius = 1.02484

== Incidents ==
=== Brig: Scipio ===
On Tuesday 23 January 1872 the brig Scipio foundered upon the Bahama Bank whilst on passage from Whitehaven to Dublin with a cargo of coal. Having departed Whitehaven at 10:00 hrs she struck upon the bank at 18:00 hrs and drove across into deeper water. Whilst running the vessel's pumps, her Master, being unaware of the seriousness of the situation, continued towards the Point of Ayre. Upon further inspection of the hold it was found to be flooded to a depth of approximately 7 ft 6 in (2.3 m) and at the same time the Scipio's steering became un-responsive. The Master ordered the lifeboats to be lowered and the crew, having got into them, landed safely 2 miles west of the Point of Ayre.

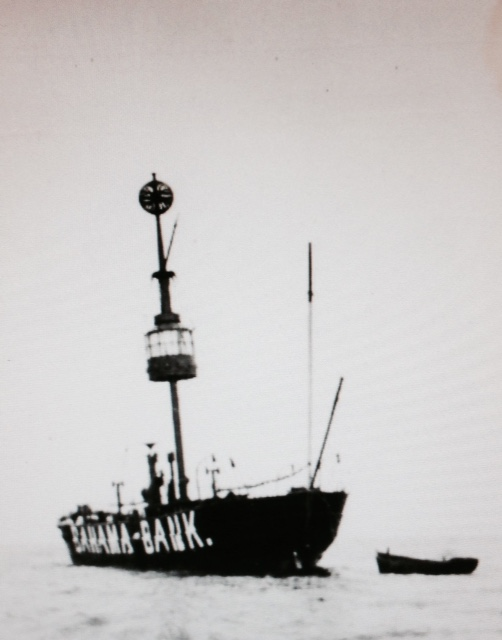
Bahama Bank Lightship

=== Barque: Neophyte ===
A similar fate to that of the Scipio befell the barque Neophyte on the evening of Tuesday 3 March 1885. The Neophyte was a barque of 1,056 gross register tons (GRT). She was built in Nova Scotia in 1882 and was sailing under the command of her Master, Capt. Leander Porter with a crew of 14. She had left Mobile, Newfoundland, on 1 September, bound for Liverpool with a cargo of 3,532 bales cotton. During the course of the passage the Neophyte encountered severe weather in the Atlantic which led to her losing some of her sails, part of her cargo and resulting in one of her lifeboats being damaged to the point where it was unseaworthy. The Neophyte arrived off the Tuskar Rock, Ireland, still experiencing stormy weather and proceeded onwards to Point Lynas on the northern coast of Anglesey in order to embark a pilot. When the Neophyte reached the pilot station no pilot boats were observed, and this led to Capt. Porter deciding to continue inbound to Liverpool. As he calculated his course a significant navigational error resulted, and this in turn caused the Neophyte to take a course to the northwest, away from Anglesey and towards the Isle of Man. The visibility was reported by Capt. Porter as being poor and combined with a heavy sea led him to subsequently state that at no time did he observe the light on the Bahama Bank Lightship, with the result being that at approximately 18:15 hrs the Neophyte struck the Bahama Bank. Captain Porter backed the top sails in order to try to get the Neophyte off the bank, but was unsuccessful. Following this he ordered an inspection of the lower part of the vessel which confirmed that the hold was flooding and this, combined with the repeated strikes upon the bank, led Capt. Porter to make the decision to abandon ship for he feared the Neophyte could be broken in two. Three men, Capt. Porter the Second Officer and a deck hand embarked in the Captain's gig, with the other crew members embarking into the remaining longboat. However the gig soon began to take on water and the three men transferred to the longboat in order to make for the shore. During the early hours of the following morning the Neophyte drifted off the Bahama Bank and was subsequently driven ashore south east of the Point of Ayre. The resulting damage caused her back to be broken and the ship became a wreck.

A formal Investigation was held at St. George's Hall, Liverpool, on 26 and 27 March 1885, before Thomas Stamford-Raffles, Stipendiary Magistrate, assisted by Captains Parish and Murdoch, Nautical Assessors, into the circumstances attending the stranding of the Neophyte. The Court found the Master in default for the loss of this vessel, stating he had utterly failed to make good his course up the channel, and how he failed to notice the numerous and well-known Lighthouses, and their associated signals which were there to guide him, the Court could not comprehend. The Court contented themselves with suspending Captain Porter's Master's Certificate for three calendar months. No other members of the crew were found to be culpable.

- Captain Porter would later explain his navigational error as resulting from an error regarding the tides around Liverpool Bay and the North Wales Coast. He stated that his charts showed a tidal speed of three knots, whereas in practice he'd judged the tidal speed to be approximately 6 knots.

=== Steam Ship: Jumbo ===
On 28 July 1888, the colonial ship Jumbo stranded on the Bahama Bank sustaining material damage. The vessel had recently departed Whitehaven, Cumberland, bound for Rosario with a cargo of rails.

=== Trawler: Albatross ===
In the early hours of Tuesday 6 November 1894, whilst making passage from Belfast to Fleetwood, the Duke of Clarence ran down and sank the steam trawler Albatross, whilst the Albatross was engaged trawling on the Bahama Bank resulting in the loss of the lives of five members of the crew of the Albatross. The Albatross, under the command of Captain Edward Shimmin was owned by Robert Knox of Douglas. The Albatross was operating in unison with the Lady Loch, commanded by Captain William Shimmin (Edward Shimmin's brother) with the two vessels separated by approximately half a mile, forming part of a fleet of 30 other trawlers fishing in the area of the Bahama Lightship. The Albatross was reported to have been lit as per the regulations with two lights on her masthead indicating a steam trawler with her nets down - a red, green and white light combined and a white globe light.

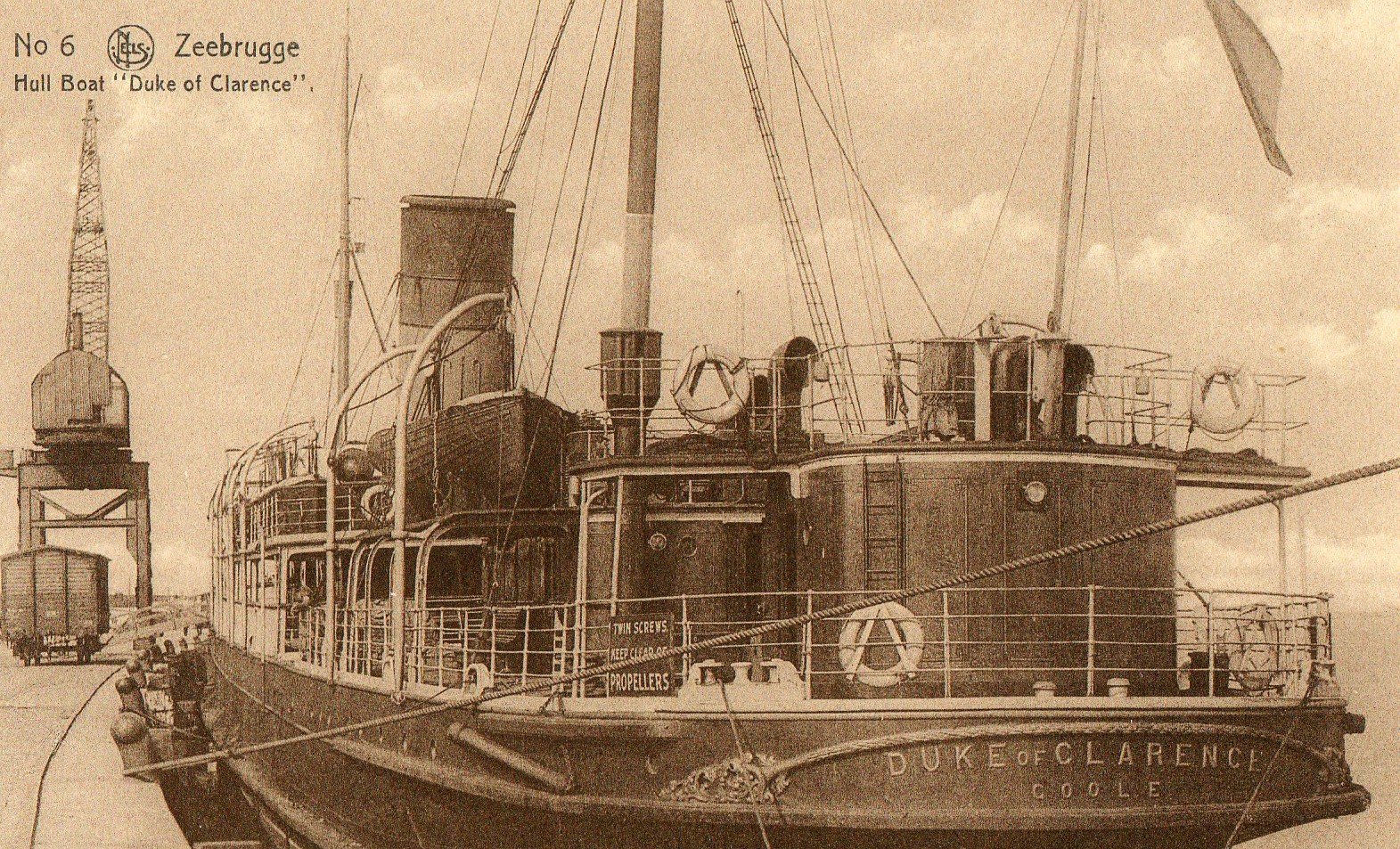
TSS Duke of Clarence

At approximately 01:10 hrs the Duke of Clarence passed the Lady Loch and shortly after collided with the Albatross, ramming the Albatross amidships, resulting in the Albatross sinking in a matter of minutes. The Lady Loch hastened to the scene and upon arrival found the Duke of Clarence stationary with two of her lifeboats engaged searching for survivors. Captain Edward Shimmin had managed to save himself by climbing aboard the Duke of Clarence, two further sailors, Robert Kelly (second engineer) and deck hand Thomas Turner, had managed to take hold of two empty fish boxes and were subsequently picked up by the lifeboats. However five crew members who were below at the time of collision were drowned.

Two further vessels joined the search, the Manx Queen which was en route from Barrow-in-Furness to Belfast was subsequently joined by the Duke of Clarence's sister, the Duke of York, which was making passage from Fleetwood to Belfast. The search lasted for three hours following which all vessels went on their respective ways. Captain Shimmin, Kelly and Turner were landed at Fleetwood and subsequently made their way back to the Isle of Man via Liverpool. As a consequence of the collision the Duke of Clarence sustained slight damage either side of her bows but was still able to resume her schedule the following night.

Those drowned were listed as: Henry Hudson (49), Richard Gregg (52), William Daugherty (50), John Leadbeater (24) and Charles Shimmin (Captain Edward Shimmin's son) (18).

A claim for damages in lieu of the loss of the Albatross was heard at the Admiralty Court in February 1895, the case being heard by Mr Justice Bruce and two Elder Brethren of Trinity House. The findings were that the Master of the Duke of Clarence was to blame, citing the inadequate posting of lookouts and a disregard for the numerous fishing vessels in the area of the fishing grounds. The damages was ascertained by the Registrar of Merchants and Knox received an undisclosed sum. The Albatross was valued at £2,000 but was insured for the sum of £12,000.

The following sums were awarded to the families of those crew members lost: The widows of William Daugherty, Henry Hudson and Richard Gregg (the three married crew members) received £300 each. The families of Hudson and Gregg also received £150 each. The (seven) children of Daugherty received £250. The father of John Leadbeater received £250.

== Radio Caroline ==
Following the merger between Radio Atlanta and Radio Caroline in July 1964, it was decided that the new venture would broadcast from the two ships which previously served the respective companies. In consequence the former Radio Atlanta ship, the MV Mi Amigo, remained off Frinton-on-Sea whilst the Caroline sailed to take up a new position off the Isle of Man. The MV Caroline arrived at her new anchorage on the southern tip of the Bahama Bank on 6 July 1964. The station then began to broadcast as Radio Caroline North, remaining at the anchorage until 3 March 1968, when Caroline was boarded and seized before the day's broadcasting began. It was then towed to Amsterdam by a salvage company to secure unpaid bills for servicing by the Dutch tender company Wijsmuller Transport

== See also ==
- Ballacash Bank
- King William Banks
- Strunakill Bank
- Whitestone Bank
