= Great Union Camera Obscura =

Coordinates: 54°08′36″N 4°28′02″W

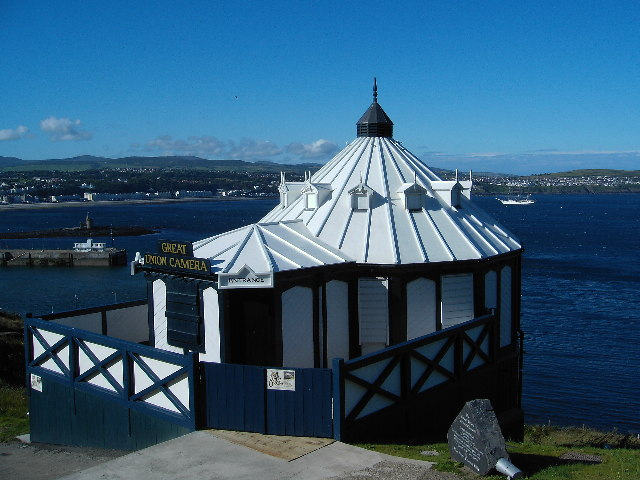
Great Union Camera Obscura.

The Great Union Camera Obscura was built during the 1890s and is located on Douglas Head near the Lighthouse. The building is a tourist attraction that offers a unique view of its surroundings. Using several lenses and mirrors, it reflects a unified, panoramic view of the surrounding area that is split into small digestible scenes and projected onto large white screens within the dark confines of the building. This optical effect is achieved by the apparatus known as camera obscura.

== History ==
Once a private undertaking and having ceased to operate in the early 1990s, the Great Union Camera Obscura is the property of DESC (The Department of Education Sport & Culture) , who placed a protective casing around its Victorian architecture structure. The Great Union Camera Obscura later underwent an extensive refurbishment and the attraction is now open in the summer months, operated by volunteers. It is a prominent and distinctive landmark when viewed from the arriving ferries of the Isle of Man Steam Packet Company.

== See also ==
- Douglas Head
- Douglas Head Amphitheatre
- Douglas Head Funicular Railway
