= Ramsey Bay =

Bay on the Isle of Man, United Kingdom

Coordinates: 54.33°N 4.34694°W

Ramsey Bay: Manx: Baie Rhumsaa
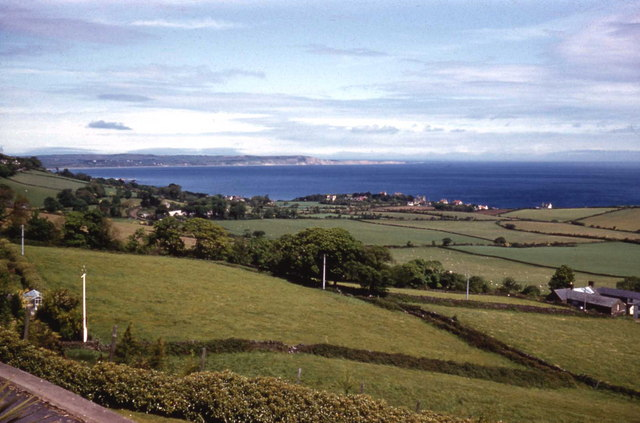

- Location within the Isle of Man
- Parish: Bride, Lezayre, Maughold, Ramsey
- Sheading: Ayre, Garff
- Crown dependency: Isle of Man
- House of Keys: Ayre & Michael, Garff, Ramsey

Ramsey Bay (Manx: Baie Rhumsaa) is a large bay and Marine Nature Reserve covering some 94 square kilometres off the northeastern coast of the Isle of Man. It runs for 18 kilometres from the Point of Ayre at the island's northern tip to Maughold Head. The port town of Ramsey, the island's second town, lies towards the south of the bay.

== Ramsey Bay Marine Nature Reserve ==
The entire bay has had statutory legal protection as Ramsey Bay Marine Nature Reserve, the island's first Marine Nature Reserve designated in October 2011 under the Wildlife Act 1990. It contains internationally significant areas of eelgrass meadows, horse mussel reefs, kelp forests and maerl beds, which boost biodiversity and create an environment for commercially important species of fish, shellfish and crustacea. Furthermore, the bay is a "core marine area" of the Isle of Man's UNESCO Biosphere Reserve. Parts of the reserve are highly protected conservation zones, while a "fisheries management zone" is co-managed by the Department of Environment, Food and Agriculture and the Manx Fish Producers' Organisation in an innovative approach to fisheries management, which sees little of this zone fished. The reserve is also part of the OSPAR network of European Marine Protected Areas. At the centre of the bay is the Ramsey Mooragh Shore Area of Special Scientific Interest, and Ramsey Harbour, along with the whole coast of the bay has been designated as an Area of Ecological Importance in the local area plan.

As of 2019 a significant part of the reserve is included in a controversial proposal for a marina which would see South Beach infilled and a new harbour built in the bay.

== Ramsey Bay in broadcasting history ==
In July 1964 the original Radio Caroline ship sailed from the coast of Essex to Ramsey Bay, from where it broadcast as Radio Caroline North until it was towed away by creditors in March 1968.

== Ramsey Bay disaster ==
On 7 March 1956 the Fleetwood-based trawler, Fleetwood Lady, anchored in Ramsey Bay to allow three of the male crew to visit their families ashore. All six crew, Allan Bradford, Arnold Brew, Albert (Abby) Cottier, Eric Lyall, his son Eric James Lyall and Reginald Wright lost their lives when their rowing boat capsized as they returned to the trawler. In March 2002 a plaque was unveiled in Ramsey to commemorate them.

== Ramsey Lifeboat Station ==
Ramsey has had a lifeboat station since 1829 which has been under the control of the Royal National Lifeboat Institution since 1868.

== See also ==
- Bahama Bank
- Bahama Bank Lightship
- Whitestone Bank
- Ballacash Bank
- King William Banks
