= Strunakill Bank =

The Stunakill Bank is a shoal approximately .65 mi (0.56 nmi; 1.05 km) west of The Point of Ayre, Isle of Man.

The bank is denoted on maritime chart AC 2094 (at position 54°25.02′N 4°22.6′W) Kirkcudbright to the Mull of Galloway & Isle of Man; AC 1826 Irish Sea Eastern Part; AC 2696 Ramsey Harbour; SC 5613.21.1 Isle of Man East Coast. Ramsey; Imray C62 Irish Sea; Imray Y70 Isle of Man (Harbour Plan of Ramsey).

Other notable sand bars and banks in the area are the Whitestone Bank, the Ballacash Bank, the Bahama Bank and the King William Banks.
