= Kitterland =

Islet in the Irish Sea

Coordinates: 54.0623°N 4.7967°W

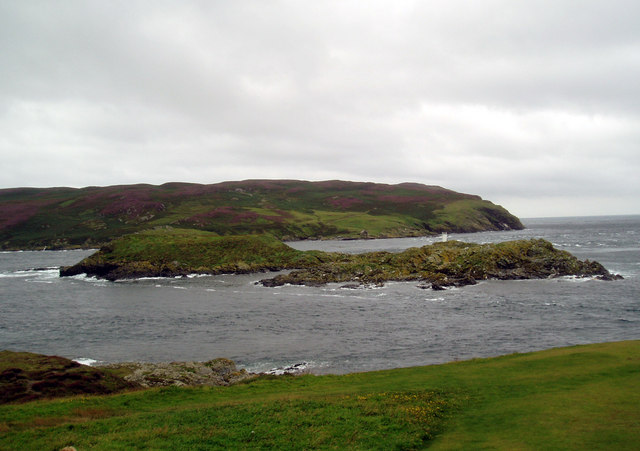
- Kitterland in the Calf Sound
- Interactive map of Kitterland

Geography
- Location: Calf Sound
- Area: 4 ha (9.9 acres)

Administration
- Isle of Man

Demographics
- Population: 0 (2011)

Kitterland (Manx: Famman Kitterland) is an islet in the Calf Sound between the Isle of Man and the Calf of Man in the Irish Sea.

Kitterland is currently owned by the Manx National Trust and has a wealth of bird and marine wildlife. Kitterland is uninhabited and is in the parish of Rushen. It is called Famman Kitterland in Manx, which roughly translates as "Tail of the Rocky Isle." Its area is less than 4 hectares (9.9 acres).

== Background ==
Legend says that the islet was named after the Norwegian Baron Kitter who supposedly ruled the Isle of Man. After killing all the deer, bison and elk on the mainland, he sailed to the Calf of Man to hunt there. While on the Calf his castle at Barrule was accidentally set on fire. Seeing his house in flames across the water he rushed back, but his boat foundered and he drowned. The islet was named after this accident.

According to a Manx legend, Baron Kitter's hunting wiped out all the animals of the Calf, and the people of Mann were afraid he would begin hunting their own beasts. So, they asked the wisest witches of the island to help them. One day while Baron Kitter was on the isle of Calf, his cook Eaoch of the Loud Voice fell asleep. The witch Ada put a spell on the pot so that it boiled over, setting the castle on fire.

Kitter's friends, who had stayed on the Calf, decided that Eaoch had plotted with the witch to kill off the Norwegians and had him brought before the Norwegian-born King Olaf I Godredsson, who sentenced him to death. Norwegian custom allowed him to choose the manner of his own death, so Eaoch said he wished to have his head laid across the king's legs and cut off with the king's own sword, which was named Macabuin. It was made by Loan Maclibuin the Dark Smith of Trondheim, and could cut the through hardest granite just by touching it. The Norwegians begged the king to refuse, but he would not break his word and gave orders to proceed. However, the witch Ada was there, and told them to lay nine times nine toads' skins, cuirn tree twigs and adders' eggs across the king's legs. When the sword was laid gently on Eaoch's neck, it instantly cut it off and cut through the adders' eggs and the cuirn tree twigs as well - only the toads' skins saved the king's legs.
