= Point of Ayre Lighthouse =

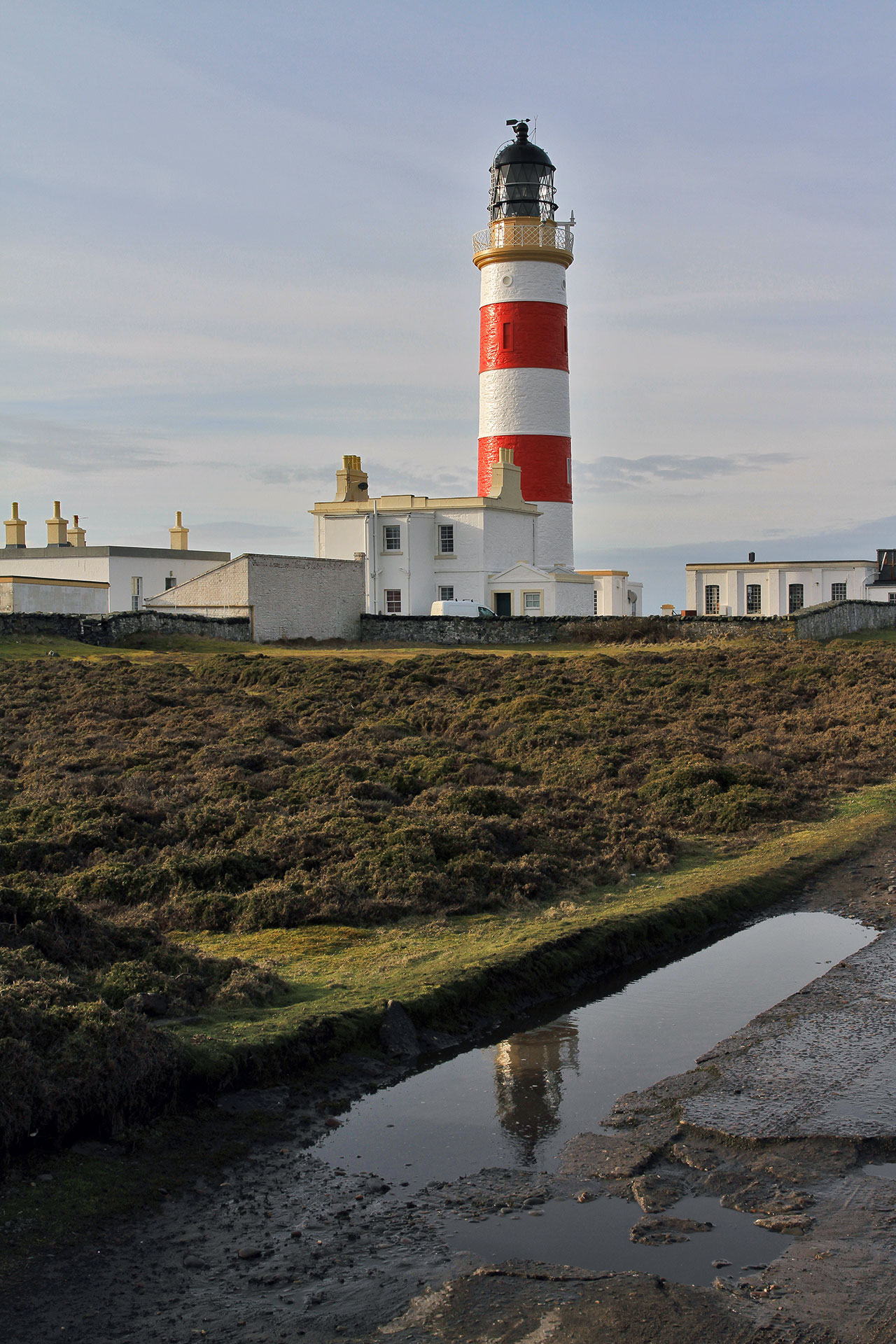
- The High light in 2010
- Location: Point of Ayre, Isle of Man
- Coordinates: 54°24′56.7″N 4°22′05.2″W

Tower
- Constructed: 1818
- Construction: limestone tower
- Automated: 1993
- Height: 30 metres (98 ft)
- Shape: cylindrical tower with balcony and lantern
- Markings: white tower with two broad red bands, black lantern
- Operator: Northern Lighthouse Board
- Heritage: registered building
- Racon: M

Light
- First lit: 1818
- Focal height: 32 metres (105 ft)
- Range: 19 nautical miles (35 km; 22 mi)
- Characteristic: Fl (4) W 20s.
- Point of Ayre Low Light
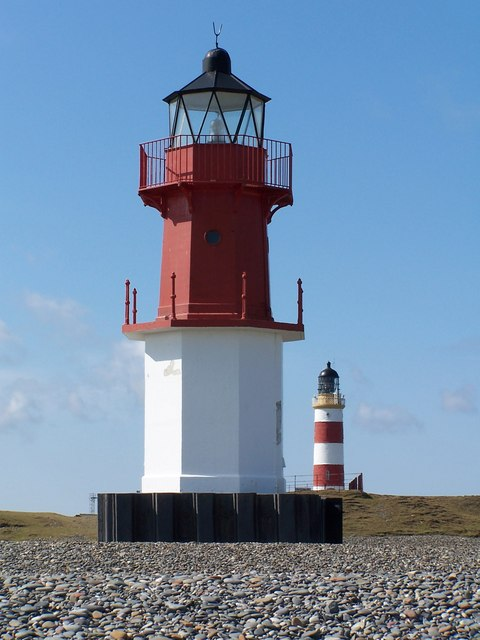
- Constructed: 1888
- Construction: concrete
- Height: 10 m (33 ft)
- Heritage: registered building
- Deactivated: 7 April 2010
- Focal height: 10 m (33 ft)
- Range: 8 nmi (15 km; 9.2 mi)
- Characteristic: Fl W 3s (–2010)

The Point of Ayre Lighthouse is an active 19th century lighthouse, sited at the Point of Ayre at the north-eastern end of the Isle of Man. It was designed and built by Robert Stevenson, grandfather of prolific writer and novelist Robert Louis Stevenson, under the Isle of Man and Calf of Man Lighthouses Act 1815 (55 Geo. 3. c. lxvii) and was first lit in 1818, making it the oldest operational lighthouse on the island.

== Description ==
The lighthouse still retains its original 1st order Fresnel lens from 1890, which was supplied by Barbier, Benard, et Turenne of Paris. With a focal height or elevation of 32 metres (105 ft) above sea level, the light from the 30 metres (98 ft) tower has a nominal range of around 19 nautical miles (35 km). Its light characteristic is made up of a pattern of four flashes of white light every twenty seconds. The tower has a distinctive daymark of two red bands, the light can be seen clearly from across the water in south-west Scotland.

Owing to the continuous accumulation of shingle and gravel deposited by the strong currents, a smaller light commonly referred to as a 'winkie' had to be built 750 feet (230 m) to the seaward side of the main tower in 1899. This was then repositioned a further 250 feet (76 m) in the same direction and for the same reasons in 1950. The 'winkie' light was discontinued on 7 April 2010.

The lighthouse buildings and land have been in private ownership since 1993 when the light was fully automated. The light continues to be maintained by the Northern Lighthouse Board based in Edinburgh. In August 2005, the fog signal at the lighthouse was decommissioned owing to the assumed reliance and availability of GPS and modern shipping guidance systems.

== Gallery ==
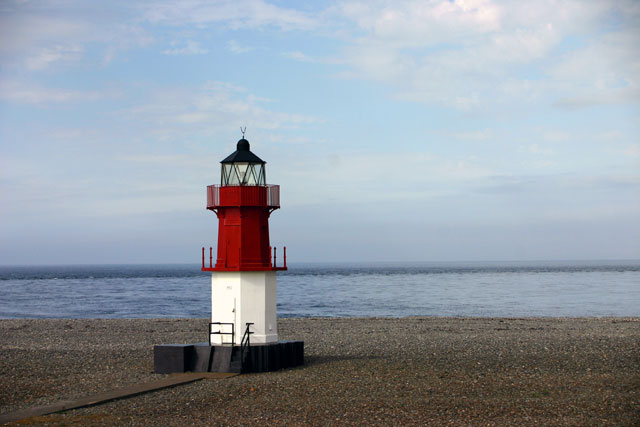
Second light at the Point of Ayre

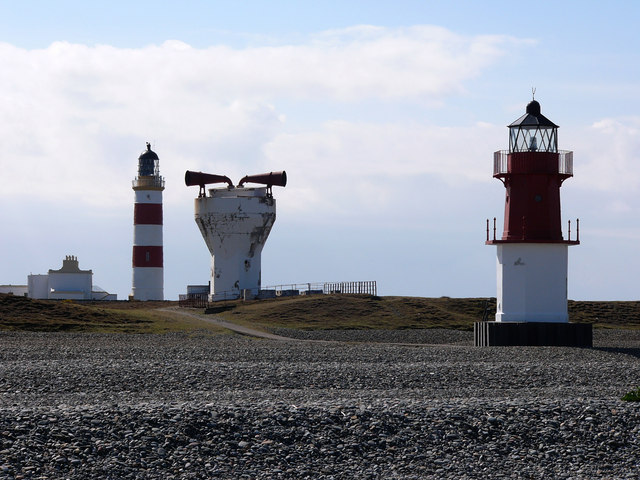
Point of Ayre lighthouses and foghorn

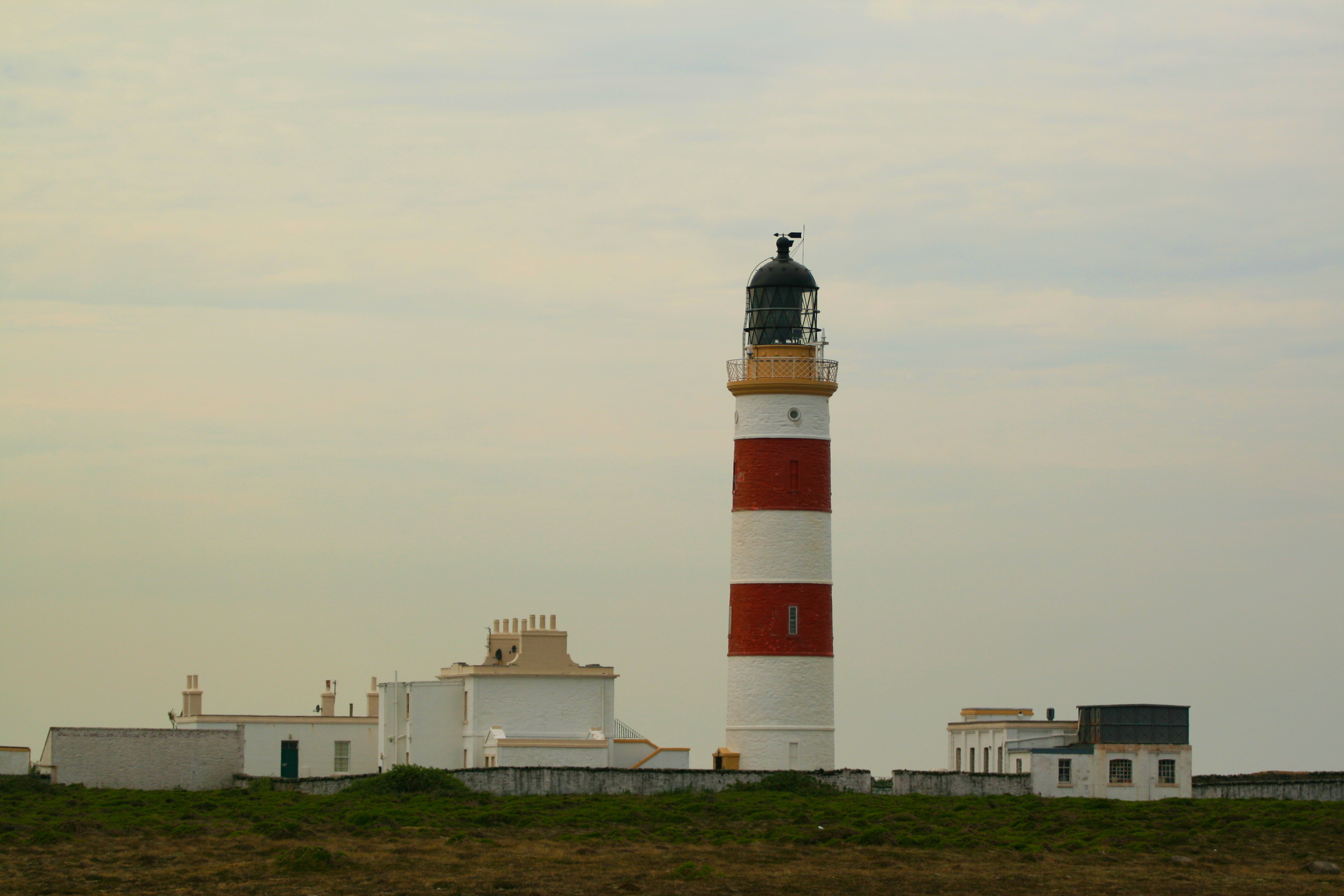
Lighthouse and keeper's cottages

== See also ==
- List of lighthouses in the Isle of Man
- List of Northern Lighthouse Board lighthouses
