= List of shipwrecks in May 1842 =

The list of shipwrecks in May 1842 includes ships sunk, foundered, wrecked, grounded, or otherwise lost during May 1842.

== 1 May ==
List of shipwrecks: 1 May 1842
Ship	State	Description
Dennis Carty	United Kingdom	The ship was driven ashore at Wexford. She was on a voyage from Wexford to London. She was refloated the next day
Thomas Worthington	United Kingdom	The ship, which had previously been abandoned by all but one of her crew, was discovered at sea by another vessel, which took off the remaining crew member. She was on a voyage from Sierra Leone to Pembroke.

== 2 May ==
List of shipwrecks: 2 May 1842
Ship	State	Description
Anna Margaretha	Lübeck	The ship ran aground on the Peter Black Sand, in The Wash. She was on a voyage from Lübeck to King's Lynn, Norfolk, United Kingdom.
Eclipse	United Kingdom	The steamship ran aground near Sunderland, County Durham. She was on a voyage from South Shields, County Durham to Hull, Yorkshire. She was refloated.
Veracity	United Kingdom	The ship ran aground on the Girdler Sand. She was on a voyage from Antwerp, Belgium to Dartmouth, Devon. She was refloated and taken into Ramsgate, Kent for repairs.

== 5 May ==
List of shipwrecks: May 1842
Ship	State	Description
Duke of Athol	United Kingdom	The ship ran aground at Lerwick, Shetland Islands. She was refloated.

== 6 May ==
List of shipwrecks: 6 May 1842
Ship	State	Description
Paoli	United Kingdom	The ship ran aground on the Holm Sand, in the North Sea. She was on a voyage from Hull, Yorkshire to South Shields, County Durham She was refloated on 10 May and put back to Hull for repairs.
Phœnix	Prussia	The ship ran aground on Morop's Reef, in the Baltic Sea. She was on a voyage from Memel to Fareham, Hampshire, United Kingdom. She was refloated and put into Gothenburg, Sweden.
Wallace	United States	The ship was driven ashore at "Kwac-point". South Holland, Netherlands. She was on a voyage from Baltimore, Maryland to Rotterdam, South Holland.

== 7 May ==
List of shipwrecks: 7 May 1842
Ship	State	Description
Ann	United Kingdom	The brig capsized off the Hebbes Sandbank, in the North Sea during a squall. Her crew were rescued. She was on a voyage from Stettin to Hull, Yorkshire. She was refloated on 29 May and taken into the Hull Roads, where she again sank.
Caspian	United Kingdom	The ship sank between Biorko and Seskar, Grand Duchy of Finland. Her crew were rescued.
Gazelle	United Kingdom	The ship foundered in the Atlantic Ocean. All on board were rescued by Hanover (France) and St. John ( (United Kingdom of Great Britain and Ireland) British North America). Gazelle was on a voyage from Liverpool, Lancashire to Newfoundland, British North America.
Jane	United Kingdom	The ship was driven ashore and severely damaged at the Souter Lighthouse, South Shields, County Durham. She was later refloated and taken into South Shields.
Jeremiah	United Kingdom	The ship was driven ashore and wrecked on the coast of Jutland 3 nautical miles (5.6 km) north east of "Hennegaard". Her crew were rescued. She was on a voyage from Newport, Monmouthshire to Stettin.
Joseph Storey	United Kingdom	The ship sank between Biorko and Seskar. Her crew were rescued.
Red Rover	United Kingdom	The ship ran aground in the Seine. Her crew were rescued. she was on a voyage from Newcastle upon Tyne, Northumberland to Rouen, Seine-Inférieure, France.
Scotia	United Kingdom	The ship was sunk by ice off Nervo Island, Russia. Her crew were rescued. She was on a voyage from Montrose, Forfarshire to Saint Petersburg, Russia.
Sheldrake	United Kingdom	The ship was driven ashore and wrecked on Inisquitte Island, County Mayo. She was on a voyage from Liverpool, Lancashire to Westport, County Mayo.

== 8 May ==
List of shipwrecks: 8 May 1842
Ship	State	Description
Baptist Meyrick	United States	The ship was driven ashore at Callantsoog, North Holland, Netherlands. Her crew were rescued. She was on a voyage from Philadelphia, Pennsylvania to Hamburg
Charles	United Kingdom	The brig collided with the steamship Comet (United Kingdom) and sank in the River Thames. She was on a voyage from London to Great Yarmouth, Norfolk.
Dundee	United Kingdom	The ship was wrecked on "Paragona". She was on a voyage from Saint Thomas, Virgin Islands to Maracaibo, Venezuela.
Gazelle	United Kingdom	The brigantine was abandoned in the Atlantic Ocean (48°21′N 32°30′W). All on board were rescued by the full-rigged ship Hanover (United States) and the barque St. John (United Kingdom). Gazelle was on a voyage from Liverpool, Lancashire to Harbour Grace, Newfoundland, British North America.
Helen Symers	United Kingdom	The brig was wrecked at Havana, Cuba. Her crew were rescued by the paddle steamer Congreso (Spanish Navy). Helen Symers was on a voyage from Havana to Cowes, Isle of Wight.
Lady Charles	United Kingdom	The brig was in collision with the steamship Gazelle (United Kingdom) and sank in the River Thames. She was on a voyage from London to Great Yarmouth, Norfolk.
Richard Webb	United Kingdom	The barque was wrecked on a reef off the Tiger Islands, in the Pacific Ocean (6°51′S 121°25′E). Her crew were rescued. She was on a voyage from Sydney, New South Wales to Batavia, Netherlands East Indies.

== 9 May ==
List of shipwrecks: 9 May 1842
Ship	State	Description
Ardgowan	United Kingdom	The ship was abandoned in the Atlantic Ocean. Her crew were rescued by James Harris (United Kingdom). The derelict was discovered on 17 June by Iodine and Marquess of Wellington (both United Kingdom) and was scuttled.
Kent	United Kingdom	The full-rigged ship was driven ashore and wrecked at Seven Islands, British North America. Her crew and 72 passengers were rescued.

== 10 May ==
List of shipwrecks: 10 May 1842
Ship	State	Description
Isabella	United Kingdom	The ship was driven ashore on Cape Breton Island, Nova Scotia, British North America. All on board were rescued. She was on a voyage from Greenock, Renfrewshire to Pictou, Nova Scotia. Isabella was refloated on 14 June and taken into Sydney, Nova Scotia.
Jane Black	United Kingdom	The ship was wrecked in the Saint Lawrence River downstream of "Pointe des Monts", Province of Canada, British North America. Her crew and all but two of the 417 passengers on board were rescued by Lumber Merchant ( (United Kingdom of Great Britain and Ireland) British North America). Jane Black was on a voyage from Limerick to Montreal, Province of Canada.
Transit	United Kingdom	The ship was wrecked on Rottnest Island. Her crew were rescued. She was on a voyage from the Cape of Good Hope to Fremantle, Swan River Colony.

== 11 May ==
List of shipwrecks: 11 May 1842
Ship	State	Description
Diligence	United Kingdom	The schooner collided with the schooner Sally and Ann (United Kingdom) and foundered in the Bristol Channel off Hartland Point, Devon. Her crew were rescued by Sally Ann. Diligence was on a voyage from St. Ives, Cornwall to Newport, Monmouthshire.
Emma	United Kingdom	The ship departed from Sierra Leone. No further trace, presumed foundered with the loss of all hands.
Indian	United Kingdom	The ship ran aground and was wrecked on the Aves Island Reef, off the coast of Venezuela. Her crew were rescued. She was on a voyage from Liverpool, Lancashire to Trinidad and Santa Marta, Republic of New Granada.
John and Jane	United Kingdom	The ship ran aground on the Nore. She was refloated and resumed her voyage to London.
Mary	United Kingdom	The ship was driven ashore at Cley-next-the-Sea, Norfolk. She was on a voyage from Newcastle upon Tyne, Northumberland to Cley-next-the-Sea. She was later refloated and taken into port.

== 12 May ==
List of shipwrecks: 12 May 1842
Ship	State	Description
Amelia	United Kingdom	The smack was wrecked at Spanish Head, Isle of Man. Her crew were rescued. She was on a voyage from Liverpool, Lancashire to Strangford, County Antrim.
Elizabeth	United Kingdom	The ship ran aground at Margate, Kent. She was on a voyage from South Shields, County Durham to Margate.
Frances	United Kingdom	The ship ran aground on the Swine Bottoms, off the coast of Denmark. She was on a voyage from Liverpool, Lancashire to Saint Petersburg, Russia. She was refloated and taken into Helsingør for repairs.
Hercules	United States	The ship ran aground in the Swine Bottoms. She was on a voyage from Charleston, South Carolina to Copenhagen. She was refloated and resumed her voyage.
Medina	United Kingdom	The paddle steamer was wrecked on a reef in the Turks Islands. All 179 people on board were rescued by the schooner Larne and paddle steamer Tweed (both United Kingdom). Medina was on a voyage from Falmouth, Cornwall to Jamaica.

== 13 May ==
List of shipwrecks: 13 May 1842
Ship	State	Description
Francis Jeffrey	United Kingdom	The brigantine was wrecked on Barebedi Point, Venezuela. Her crew were rescued.
Valiant	United Kingdom	The ship ran aground at Sunderland, County Durham. She was refloated the next day and put back to Sunderland.

== 15 May ==
List of shipwrecks: 15 May 1842
Ship	State	Description
Leda	United Kingdom	The ship capsized in the River Usk. She was righted on 17 May and taken into Newport, Monmouthshire.

== 16 May ==
List of shipwrecks: 16 May 1842
Ship	State	Description
Hiram	United Kingdom	The ship ran aground in the Willems Rek Channel. She was on a voyage from Antwerp, Belgium to Newcastle upon Tyne, Northumberland. She was later refloated and put back to Antwerp.

== 17 May ==
List of shipwrecks: 17 May 1842
Ship	State	Description
Anna Liffey	United States	The ship struck an iceberg and foundered in the Atlantic Ocean. Her crew were rescued. She was on a voyage from New York to Antwerp, Belgium.
Dove	United Kingdom	The schooner ran aground at Kingstown, County Dublin. She was refloated and taken into Kingstown.
Edgar	United Kingdom	The ship ran aground on the Ooster Sandbank, in the North Sea off the Dutch coast. She was on a voyage from Ramsgate, Kent to Rotterdam, South Holland, Netherlands. Edgar was refloated and completed her voyage.

== 18 May ==
List of shipwrecks: 18 May 1942
Ship	State	Description
INS Ariadne	Indian Navy	The steamship struck a rock off Shanghai, China, and was damaged. She was refloated with the assistance of INS Sesostris ( Indian Navy) and beached at Chusan. She sank on 23 June with the loss of three crew.
Marie Catherine	United Kingdom	The ship was wrecked at "Maroun". She was on a voyage from Maroun to Stockholm.
William Nicol	(United Kingdom of Great Britain and Ireland) New South Wales	The ship was wrecked on a reef off Port Louis, Mauritius. She was on a voyage from Adelaide, South Australia to Bombay, India.

== 19 May ==
List of shipwrecks: 19 May 1842
Ship	State	Description
Industry	United Kingdom	The smack foundered in the Bristol Channel 2 nautical miles (3.7 km) south east of The Mumbles, Glamorgan with the loss of one of her two crew. She was on a voyage from Aberthaw to Aberavon, Glamorgan.

== 20 May ==
List of shipwrecks: 20 May 1842
Ship	State	Description
Nordstjernen	(Russian Empire) Grand Duchy of Finland	The ship foundered 8 leagues (24 nautical miles (44 km)) off Hanö, Sweden. Her crew survived. She was on a voyage from Helsinki to Hull, Yorkshire and/or London, United Kingdom.
Recovery	(United Kingdom of Great Britain and Ireland) New South Wales	The schooner was wrecked at Red Head with the loss of one of her six crew.

== 21 May ==
List of shipwrecks: 21 May 1842
Ship	State	Description
Pell's One	United Kingdom	The ship ran aground on the Burbo Bank, in Liverpool Bay. She was on a voyage from Liverpool, Lancashire to Richibucto, New Brunswick, British North America. She was refloated the next day and proceeded on her voyage.

== 23 May ==
List of shipwrecks: 23 May 1842
Ship	State	Description
Amelia	(France) Guadeloupe	The schooner was wrecked at Fort Point, Nevis.

== 24 May ==
List of shipwrecks: 24 May 1842
Ship	State	Description
Carl Frederick	Denmark	The ship ran aground off "Undersken" and was consequently beached in "Fioge Bay". She was on a voyage from "Kasco" to London, United Kingdom.
Eliza	United Kingdom	The ship ran aground off Helsingør, Denmark. She was on a voyage from Königsberg, Prussia to London. She was refloated and resumed her voyage.
Harmonie	France	The ship caught fire and sank in the Atlantic Ocean 40 leagues (120 nautical miles (220 km)) off the coast of Portugal. Her crew were rescued. She was on a voyage from Cette, Hérault to Dunkirk, Nord.

== 25 May ==
List of shipwrecks: 25 May 1842
Ship	State	Description
Hanover	United Kingdom	The ship ran aground on the Inner Sand, in the North Sea. She was on a voyage from South Shields, County Durham to Saint Vincent, Virgin Islands. She was later refloated.

== 26 May ==
List of shipwrecks: May 1842
Ship	State	Description
Galatea	United Kingdom	The ship struck a sunken rock west of Tarifa, Spain and foundered. Her crew were rescued by Providence (United Kingdom). Galatea was on a voyage from Newcastle upon Tyne, Northumberland to Naples, Kingdom of the Two Sicilies.
Industry	United Kingdom	The sloop foundered in the Bristol Channel off the Mumbles Lighthouse, Glamorgan with the loss of a crew member. She was on a voyage from Cardiff to The Mumbles.
Sir William Curtis	United Kingdom	The ship ran aground and was severely damaged near Haverfordwest, Pembrokeshire. She was on a voyage from Great Yarmouth, Norfolk to Haverfordwest.

== 27 May ==
List of shipwrecks: 27 May 1842
Ship	State	Description
Blue-eyed Maid	(United Kingdom of Great Britain and Ireland) Jamaica	The sloop foundered off Oracabessa. Her crew were rescued.
Water Witch	(United Kingdom of Great Britain and Ireland) Tobago	The drogher was wrecked on Smith's Island.

== 28 May ==
List of shipwrecks: 29 May 1842
Ship	State	Description
Adang	Netherlands	The ship ran aground on the Goodwin Sands, Kent, United Kingdom. She was refloated.
Foster	United Kingdom	The ship was wrecked at Sulina, Ottoman Empire.
Medora	United Kingdom	The ship ran aground on the Cobler's Rocks, off Barbados. All on board were rescued. She was on a voyage from Liverpool, Lancashire to Barbados.

== 29 May ==
List of shipwrecks: 29 May 1842
Ship	State	Description
Helen	United Kingdom	The ship was wrecked in Table Bay. Her crew were rescued. She was on a voyage from Saint Helena to the Cape Colony.

== 30 May ==
List of shipwrecks: 30 May 1842
Ship	State	Description
Liberty	United Kingdom	The ship ran aground and was wrecked near Longhope, Orkney Islands. She was on a voyage from Arklow, County Wicklow to Newcastle upon Tyne, Northumberland.
Nina	Mexico	The ship was driven ashore in the Gulf of California.
Victoria	United Kingdom	The brig foundered in the North Sea 210 nautical miles (390 km) east by south of the Isle of May. Her crew were rescued by the fishing smack Phœnix (Belgium). She was on a voyage from Charleston, South Carolina to Travemünde, Prussia.

== 31 May ==
List of shipwrecks: 31 May 1842
Ship	State	Description
Janet Phillipps	United Kingdom	The ship ran aground off Great Yarmouth, Norfolk. She was on a voyage from Inverkeithing, Fife to the Rhône. she was later refloated and resumed her voyage.
Mayflower	United Kingdom	The ship ran aground off the Nakkehead Lighthouse, Denmark. She was on a voyage from Newcastle upon Tyne, Northumberland to "Wisbeck". She was later refloated.

== Unknown date ==
List of shipwrecks: unknown date in May 1842
Ship	State	Description
Alexandre	(France) Senegal	The steamship was lost in the Bissagos Channel, off Senegal before 13 May. Her crew were rescued. She was on a voyage from the Nunez River to Bissau.
Anne	(United Kingdom of Great Britain and Ireland) Gambia Colony and Protectorate	The ship was wrecked on "Alcatrass" before 25 May. Her crew were rescued.
Avon	(United Kingdom of Great Britain and Ireland) New South Wales	The whaler was lost at "Rottormar", New Zealand before 13 May.
Edward	United Kingdom	The ship was abandoned in the Atlantic Ocean before 21 May. Six of her crew were rescued by Irvine (United Kingdom). Edward was on a voyage from Bristol, Gloucestershire to Quebec City, Province of Canada, British North America.
Lady Willoughby	United Kingdom	The ship was driven ashore at "Gannel", Cornwall on or before 24 May. She was on a voyage from Youghal, County Cork to Portreath, Cornwall.
Leocadie	France	The ship ran aground on the Long Sand, in the North Sea off the coast of Essex, United Kingdom. She was refloated on 20 May with assistance from Good Intent, Rumley and Sea Mew (all United Kingdom). Leocadie was on a voyage from Sunderland, County Durham, United Kingdom to Rouen, Seine-Inférieure.
Lively	United States	The fishing schooner was lost on Cape Cod. Crew saved.
Wanderer	United Kingdom	The ship was driven ashore near the Cape of Good Hope before 7 May. She was on a voyage from Singapore to Halifax, Nova Scotia, British North America. Wanderer was refloated but consequently condemned.
Zavala	Texas Navy	The paddle schooner was scuttled at Galveston.
