= TSS Duke of Clarence =

British passenger ship

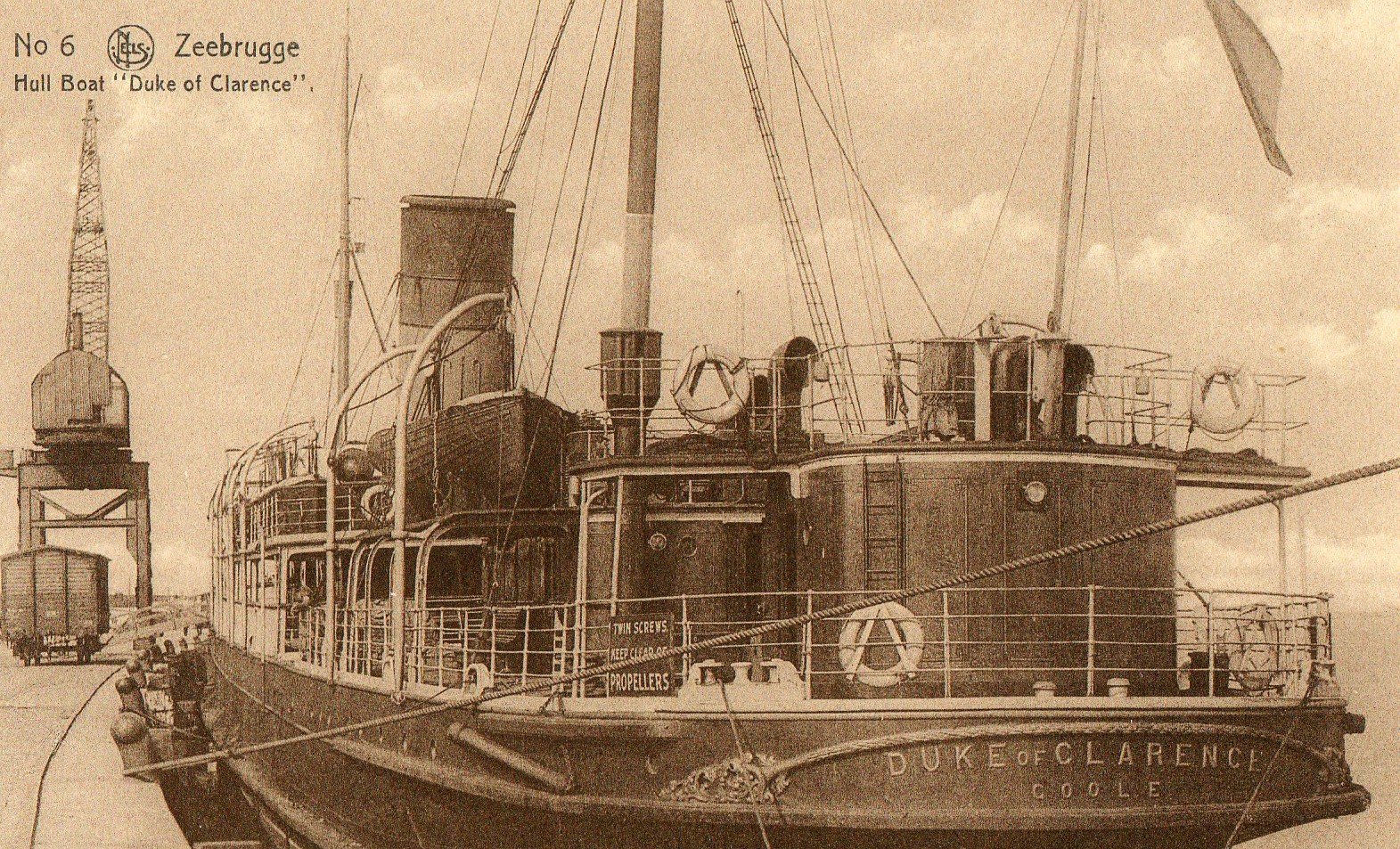
- Duke of Clarence

History
- Name: Duke of Clarence
- Owner: London and North Western Railway and Lancashire and Yorkshire Railway (joint owners 1892–1906); Lancashire and Yorkshire Railway (1906–1922); London and North Western Railway (1922–1923); London, Midland and Scottish Railway (1923–1930)
- Port of registry: (United Kingdom of Great Britain and Ireland) Fleetwood (1892–1907); (United Kingdom) Goole (1907–1930)
- Route: Belfast – Fleetwood; Fleetwood – Derry; Liverpool – Drogheda; Hull – Zeebrugge
- Builder: Laird Brothers, Birkenhead
- Yard number: 582
- Launched: 17 November 1891
- Completed: 1892
- Out of service: 1930
- Identification: UK Official Number 89707; Code Letters MNSP ( -1930)
- Fate: Scrapped

General characteristics
- Tonnage: 1,458 gross register tons (GRT), 531 NRT; later 1,653 GRT, 687 NRT
- Length: 312 ft 5 in (95.22 m)
- Beam: 36 ft 2 in (11.02 m)
- Depth: 16 ft 7 in (5.05 m)
- Installed power: Twin 3-cylinder triple-expansion steam engines
- Propulsion: Twin screw propellers
- Speed: 19 knots (35 km/h)

TSS Duke of Clarence was a passenger vessel operated jointly by the London and North Western Railway and the Lancashire and Yorkshire Railway (LYR) from 1892 between Fleetwood and northern Irish ports. In 1906 the LYR bought her outright and transferred her to their summer service from Hull to Zeebrugge, returning to the Irish Sea in winter. During the First World War Duke of Clarence served as an armed boarding steamer. She resumed passenger service in 1920, passing through changes of ownership in the reorganisations of Britain's railway companies in the 1920s, until she was scrapped in 1930.

== Description ==
Duke of Clarence was 312 feet 5 inches (95.22 m) long, with a beam of 36 feet 2 inches (11.02 m) and a depth of 16 feet 7 inches (5.05 m). As built, she was 1,458 GRT. She was later listed in Lloyd's Register as 1,653 GRT, 687 NRT.

A pair of Laird Brothers three-cylinder triple-expansion steam engines, each of which had cylinders of 22 inches (56 cm), 34 inches (86 cm) and 51 inches (130 cm) diameter by 33 inches (84 cm) stroke, connected to twin screws provided her propulsion. The engines gave Duke of Clarence a top speed of 19 knots (35 km/h).

== Service life ==
Ordered by the Lancashire and Yorkshire Railway (LYR), Duke of Clarence was built at Laird Brothers, Birkenhead, as the first of seven ships that they delivered between 1892 and 1909. It was originally intended to name her Birkenhead, but it was thought that passengers might be put off by thoughts of the sinking of HMS Birkenhead. She was allocated the United Kingdom Official Number 89707 and the code letters MNSP. She was completed for the joint ownership of LYR and the London and North Western Railway (LNWR). She was acquired outright by the LYR in 1906 for service on the North Sea. She passed to the LNWR in 1922 and, following the grouping of Britain's railways under the Railways Act 1921, to the London, Midland and Scottish Railway in the following year.

Duke of Clarence was used on routes from Fleetwood to Belfast and Derry until 1906. Following this she served on the Hull to Zeebrugge route during the summer and west coast routes during the winter, including the Liverpool to Drogheda route. The Zeebrugge service was suspended during World War I and the Admiralty requisitioned her for use as an armed boarding steamer, stationed in the Channel approaches and later on the Northern Patrol. She returned to the Zeebrugge service in February 1920.

Withdrawn and laid up at Fleetwood in September 1929, she was sold in May 1930 for scrapping to Thos. W. Ward and broken up at Barrow in Furness. Duke of Connaught then replaced Duke of Clarence.

== Incidents ==
In the early hours of Tuesday 6 November 1894, whilst making passage from Belfast to Fleetwood, Duke of Clarence ran down and sank the steam trawler Albatross, whilst Albatross was engaged trawling on the Bahama Bank to the northeast of Ramsey, Isle of Man. The accident resulted in the loss of the lives of five members of the crew of Albatross. Albatross, under the command of Captain Edward Shimmin, was owned by Robert Knox of Douglas. Albatross was operating in coordination with Lady Loch, commanded by Captain William Shimmin, (Edward Shimmin's brother), with the two vessels separated by approximately half a mile, forming part of a fleet of 30 other trawlers fishing in the area of the Bahama Lightship. Albatross was reported to have been lit as per the regulations with two lights on her masthead indicating a steam trawler with her nets down - a red, green and white light combined and a white globe light.

At approximately 01:10 hrs Duke of Clarence passed Lady Loch and shortly after collided with Albatross, ramming the Albatross amidships, resulting in Albatross sinking in a matter of minutes. Lady Loch hastened to the scene and upon arrival found Duke of Clarence stationary with two of her lifeboats engaged searching for survivors. Captain Edward Shimmin had managed to save himself by climbing aboard Duke of Clarence, two further sailors, Robert Kelly (second engineer) and deck hand Thomas Turner, had managed to take hold of two empty fish boxes and were subsequently picked up by the lifeboats. However five crew members who were below at the time of collision drowned.

Two further vessels joined the search, Manx Queen, which was en route from Barrow-in-Furness to Belfast, was subsequently joined by Duke of Clarence's sister, Duke of York, which was making passage from Fleetwood to Belfast. The search lasted for three hours, following which all vessels went on their respective ways. Captain Shimmin, Kelly, and Turner were landed at Fleetwood and subsequently made their way back to the Isle of Man via Liverpool. As a consequence of the collision Duke of Clarence sustained slight damage to both sides of her bows but was still able to resume her schedule the following night.

Those drowned were listed as: Henry Hudson (49), Richard Gregg (52), William Daugherty (50), John Leadbeater (24) and Charles Shimmin (Captain Edward Shimmin's son) (18).

A claim for damages in lieu of the loss of Albatross was heard at the Admiralty Court in February 1895, the case being heard by Mr Justice Bruce and two Elder Brethren of Trinity House. The findings were that the Master of Duke of Clarence was to blame, citing the inadequate posting of lookouts and a disregard for the numerous fishing vessels in the area of the fishing grounds. The damages was ascertained by the Registrar of Merchants with Knox receiving an undisclosed sum. Albatross was valued at £2,000 but was insured for the sum of £12,000.

The following sums were awarded to the families of those crew members lost: The widows of William Daugherty, Henry Hudson, and Richard Gregg (the three married crew members) received £300 each. The families of Hudson and Gregg also received £150 each. The (seven) children of Daugherty received £250. The father of John Leadbeater received £250.

With the payment received for the loss of the Albatross, Robert Knox purchased a replacement, Rose Ann.
