= Chicken Rock =

Islet southwest of the Isle of Man

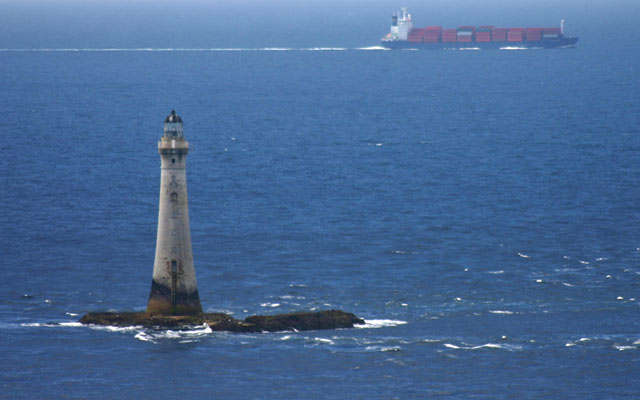
- Chicken Rock lighthouse with passing cargo vessel

- Location within Isle of Man

Geography
- Location: Irish Sea
- Coordinates: 54.03785°N 4.83858°W
- Area: 0.1 ha (0.25 acres)

Administration
- Isle of Man

Chicken Rock (Manx: Carrick ny Kirkey) is the southernmost island administered by the Isle of Man that is administered under Rushen parish. It lies southwest of the Calf of Man, 4.5 kilometres (2.8 mi) off Spanish Head on the Manx mainland. The most prominent feature of the rock is the 19th century Chicken Rock Lighthouse. The 44 metres (144 ft) lighthouse was first lit in 1875, and is owned and maintained by the Northern Lighthouse Board.

== See also ==
- List of lighthouses in the Isle of Man
