= Douglas Head Lighthouse =

Lighthouse on the Isle of Man

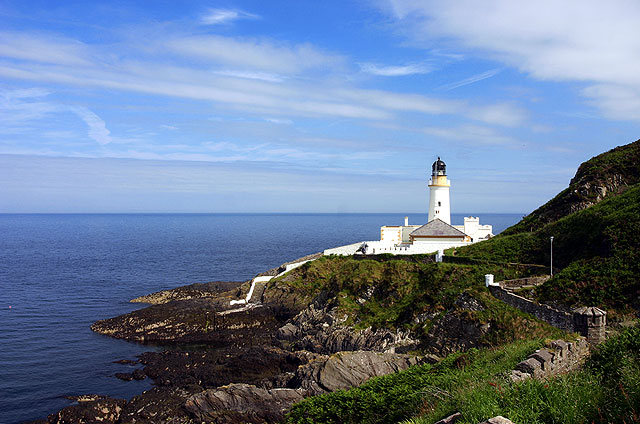
- Location: Douglas Head, Douglas, Isle of Man
- Coordinates: 54°08′36.34″N 4°27′56.9″W

Tower
- Constructed: 1832 (first)
- Construction: masonry tower
- Automated: 1986
- Height: 20 metres (66 ft)
- Shape: taperedl cylindrical tower with balcony and lantern
- Markings: white tower, black lantern
- Operator: Northern Lighthouses Board
- Heritage: registered building

Light
- First lit: 1857 (current)
- Focal height: 32 metres (105 ft)
- Range: 24 nautical miles (44 km; 28 mi)
- Characteristic: Fl W 10s.

Douglas Head Lighthouse is a lighthouse at Douglas Head on the Isle of Man located between England and Ireland.

The lighthouse was established in 1857, although the vicinity was under the control of the Isle of Man Harbour Board from 1832.

It was made by the engineering brothers David and Thomas Stevenson with a total elevation of 32 metres (105 ft). The white tower is 20 metres (66 ft) in height and its base is at an elevation of 12 metres (39 ft).

The lighthouse staircase has 71 steps and the light has an average range of 24 nautical miles (44 km). The lantern is composed of eight brilliant reflectors made of pure silver built in 1831. The light flashes white every ten seconds.

== History ==
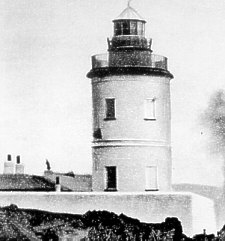
The lighthouse before 1892

Structural problems required the lighthouse to be rebuilt in 1892.

The lighthouse became automated in 1986.

Recently, a new public footpath was constructed by the Commissioners from the top of Port Skillion down to the Lighthouse for the benefit and enjoyment of tourists and sightseers.

== Ownership ==
After the establishment of the new lighthouse in 1857, jurisdiction transferred from the Commissioners of Douglas Harbour to the Commissioners of the Northern Lighthouse. The lighthouse is still run to this day by the Commissioners of the Northern Lighthouse, who also operate the Northern lighthouse on the Isle of Man.

== Etymology ==
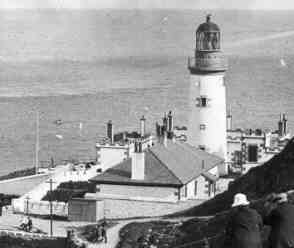
The modern completed lighthouse with foghorn c.1907 with courthouses

The name Douglas means 'Blackstream' (Dubh -black and Glais -stream. Some Manx people believe the name was derived from two rivers, the Dhoo and the Glass, the black and green streams of the Greu river.

== Specifics of the light ==
The 12-metre (39 ft) high light has two double banked units of twelve lamps mounted facing in opposite directions, rotated by an AGA PRB21 Gearless Drive Unit operating at three revolutions-per-minute, thus giving a flash in any given direction every ten seconds.

Only eight out of the twelve lamps on each face are used in normal operation. They are rated at 30 volts 200 watts, but run at 25 volts 150 watts to provide increased service life. The other four lamps are 6 volts 28.5 watts and are used only as emergency lamps. Such emergencies may be loss of mains electric power or, far less likely, the complete failure of the main lamp banks. The four lamps in each of the two main banks are connected in series, which gives each unit the same intensity; however, if one lamp fails, all four in that bank go out. The four emergency lamps on each face are also connected in series in sets of two. Power is provided by emergency batteries. The emergency light is a 200 millimetres (8 in) lantern mounted on the balcony rail.

== Monitoring and general conditioning ==
Fully automated since 1986, the light is monitored by the Northern Lighthouse Commissioners at their Northern Lighthouse Board Monitoring Centre. Initially after automation, an attendant from the Northern Board would visit the lighthouse on a fortnightly basis to test system procedures and the general physical condition of the building.

However, since September 2004, the Retained Lighthouse Keeper of the Isle of Man has replaced the attendant and visits now on a monthly basis.

In addition, lighthouse technicians visit the Douglas Head Light once or twice annually to modify and update the system equipment if necessary.

== See also ==
- List of lighthouses in the Isle of Man
