= King William Banks =

Series of sand banks near Isle of Man

Coordinates: 54°27′00.00″N 4°04′59.00″W

The King William Banks are a series of sand banks 14 mi (12 nmi; 23 km) Northeast of Ramsey, Isle of Man.

The King William Banks take their name from the stranding, in 1690, of King William III whilst he was en route from the River Dee to Carrickfergus. A story relates that on June 10, 1690, it being a spring tide, King William embarked on his ship in an area of the River Dee near Hoylake referred to as the King's Gap. Edward Tariton, Master of the James, of Liverpool, piloted the King's vessel on its voyage to Carrickfergus. At approximately 04:00hrs the following morning (June 11) the vessel grounded on a sandbank off the Point of Ayre, Isle of Man, during a period of low water (the bank being uncharted). The King's vessel was aground for approximately 1 hour.

The King William Banks lie centered approximately 2 mi (1.7 nmi; 3.2 km) east of the Ballacash Bank. The banks extend approximately 6 mi (5.2 nmi; 9.7 km) east-south-east and have a least depth of 2.8 m (9.2 ft).

First marked by navigational buoys in 1843, the banks are denoted on maritime chart AC 2094 Kirkcudbright to the Mull of Galloway & Isle of Man; AC 1826 Irish Sea Eastern Part; AC 2696 Ramsey Harbour; SC 5613.21.1 Isle of Man East Coast. Ramsey; Imray C62 Irish Sea; Imray Y70 Isle of Man (Harbour Plan of Ramsey). A lighted buoy, moored 13 mi (11 nmi; 21 km) east of the Point of Ayre, marks the eastern extremity of the banks.

Other sandbars and banks in the area are the Ballacash Bank, the Bahama Bank, the Strunakill Bank and the Whitestone Bank.
