= Automatic lamp changer =

Device to replace a failed light

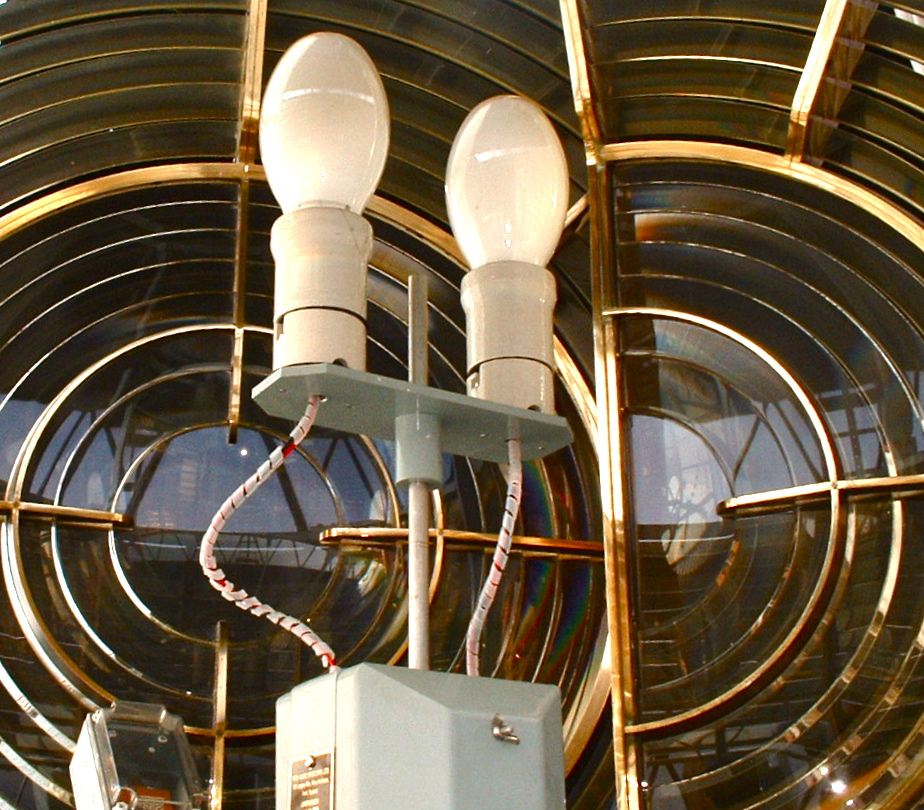
Lampchanger in the Maughold Head Lighthouse, Isle of Man. This is a model NALC-89, produced by Nav-Aids Systems, LTD, in Kent, England.

An automatic lamp changer (or lampchanger) is a device used to ensure that a navigational light such as a marine lighthouse or aero beacon stays lit even if a bulb burns out. Numerous types exist. The common design elements are an array of two or more lamps (or bulbs), installed on a mounting which can rotate to various positions. Each position brings a different lamp into the focal point of an optical assembly. Since signal and navigational lights use sophisticated optics to focus the beam, lampchangers are designed to position the new bulb at the focal point with high precision. The device automatically detects when the currently active lamp has ceased to function and moves the next lamp into place.

== History ==
The automatic lampchanger was invented by Charles Wallace and patented in 1928. This original model held two headlight lamps from a Model T automobile. The United States Lighthouse Service had these in common use by the 1930s, as they moved to convert all navigational lights to electricity.

== Types in current use ==
6-Lamp changer in a modern marine beacon

Lamp changers in current use may have two, four, or six lamps and use either a spring-loaded mechanism or an electric motor to change lamps when required. They are used in aerodrome beacons and marine navigational aids.

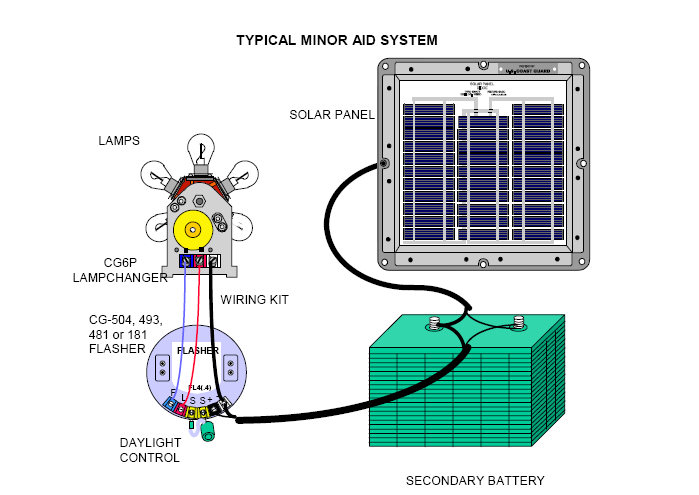
Typical application of an automatic lampchanger
