= Loan Maclibuin =

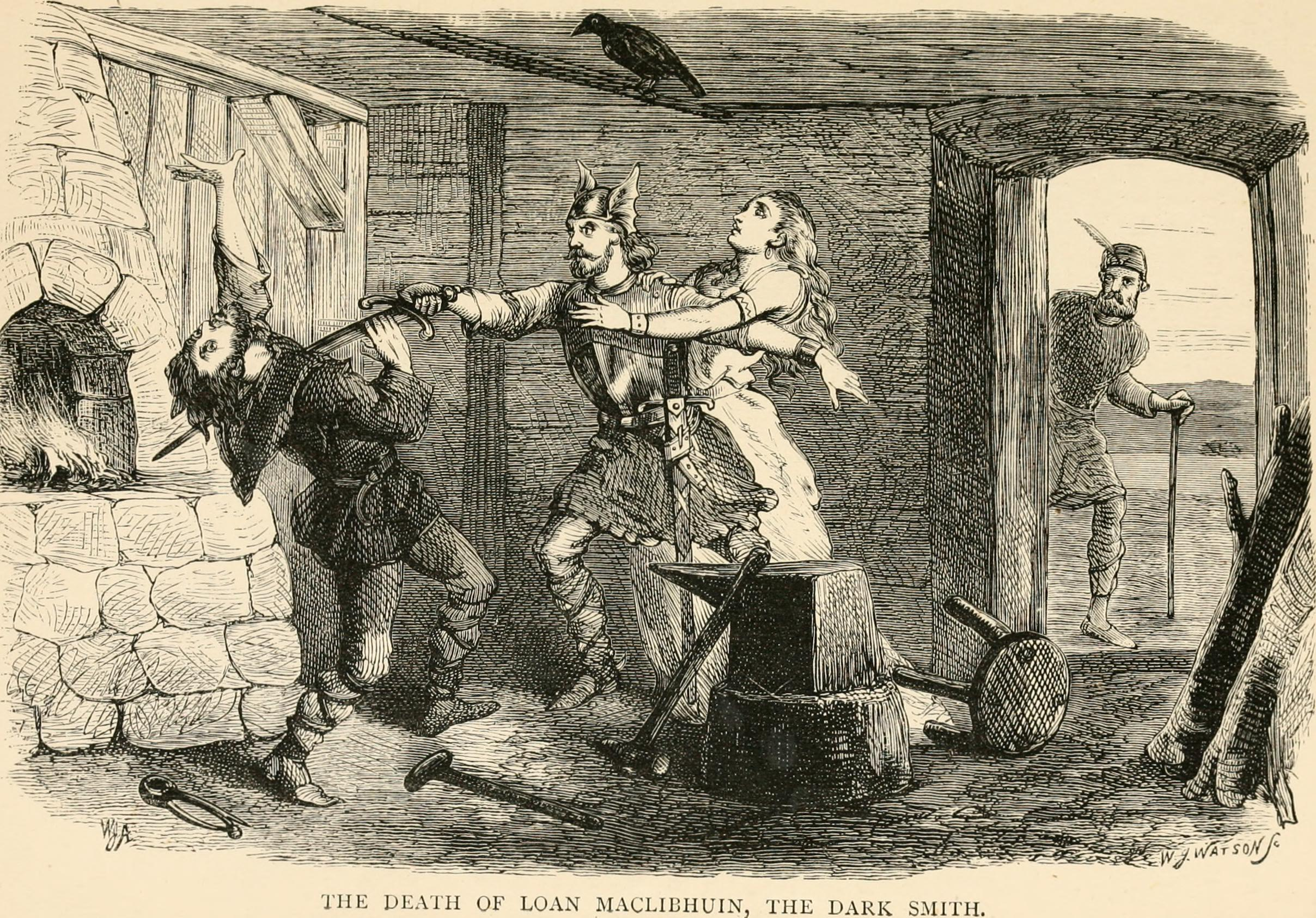
- The Death of Loan Maclibuin, The Dark Smith (1882)
- Died: Norway
- Other names: The Dark Smith of Trondheim, Son of Luan Lon Mac Liomtba, Loan Maclibhuin
- Occupation: swordsmith
- Children: Emergaid

Loan Maclibuin was a legendary Norwegian smith. He was known as "The Dark Smith of Trondheim". He was the seventh son of Windy Cap, King of Norway. The "dark", does not refer to his working black magic, but rather to his swarthy nature.

== History ==
He is generally known from the tale "Olave Goddardson And The Sword Macabuin".

According to Manx legend, Baron Kitter's hunting had wiped out the animals of the Calf of Man, and the people of Man were afraid he would begin hunting their own beasts. They asked the wisest witches of the island to help them. While Baron Kitter was on the Calf, his cook Eaoch of the Loud Voice fell asleep. The witch Ada put a spell on the pot so that the fat within boiled over, setting the castle on fire. Kitter's friends, who had stayed on the Calf, decided that Eaoch had plotted with the witch to kill off the Norwegians and had him brought before the Norwegian-born King Olave, who sentenced him to death.

Norwegian custom allowed him to choose the manner of his death, so Eaoch said he wished to have his head laid across the King's legs and cut off with the King's own sword. This sword, Macabuin, made by Loan Maclibuin the Dark Smith of Trondheim, could cut the hardest granite just by touching it. The Norwegians begged the King to refuse, but he would not break his word and gave orders to proceed. However, the witch Ada was there, and told them to lay nine times nine toads' skins, rowan twigs and adders' eggs across the King's legs. When the sword was laid gently on Eaoch's neck, it instantly cut it off, and cut through the adders' eggs and the rowan twigs as well - only the toads' skins saved the King's legs.

Loan heard about this and was angered, since the sword was given with the agreement that it not be stained with the blood of a low-born man. He sent his hammerman, Hiallus-nan-urd, who had lost a leg in the tempering of the sword Macabuin and had a mechanical one put in place.

Hiallus-nan-urd challenged Olave to travel with him to Trondheim to see the smith about the matter. Olave and he left, traveling by foot from Peel Castle to Ramsey and by boat to Trondheim. Most versions gloss over the journey, which compares and contrasts their pagan and Christian natures.

By a strategy, Olave manages to be first in the door of Loan's smithy, barring the door against Hiallus-nan-urd. He picks up a large hammer and strikes the anvil, breaking it in two and turning the stone base to gravel. He spots Emergaid, Loan's daughter and learns from her that Loan is of royal blood and had caused him to come there so he could quench a new and better sword in Olave's blood. Olave seized the sword and did to Loan what he had intended for Olave. Emergaid faints at the sight, missing his killing of Hiallus-nan-urd by cutting him in two, lengthwise. Emergaid returns with Olave to Man and they are married.

== Creations ==
- The sword Macabuin (Stainless) which cut through anything in its path. Forged for Olave Goddardson.
- Mechanical leg of Hiallus-nan-urd
- Unnamed sword

== Historical identities ==
Olave Goddardson is likely Olaf I Godredsson. Macabuin may be connected with the Manx Sword of State.

Alswith, son of Hiallus-nan-urd, is connected with a hill on the Isle of Man, called "Break my Heart Hill (Ughtagh breesh my chree)."

== Influence ==
The character of Zee (full name Siebold Adelbertskrieger) from the Mercy Thompson series is based on him, and sometimes referred to as the dark smith of Drontheim.
