= Spanish Head =

Promontory on the southwestern coast of the Isle of Man

Coordinates: 54°03′25″N 4°46′53″W

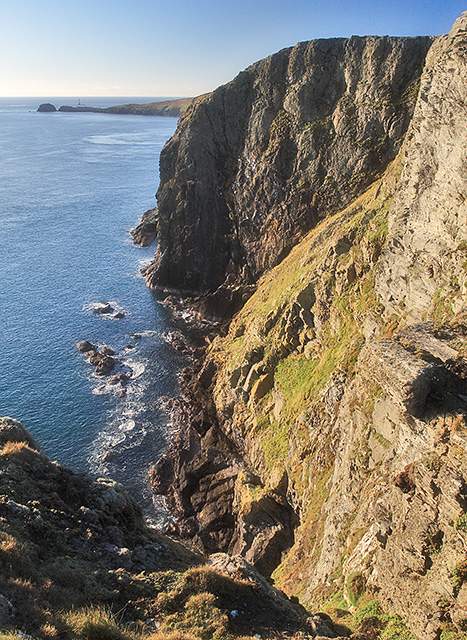
Spanish Head

Spanish Head is a promontory on the southwestern coast of the Isle of Man, rising over 110 metres (350 ft) from sea level.

Spanish Head is 6 kilometres (4 mi) south west of Port St Mary, and the Calf of Man lies to the southwest of the head, separated from it by the Calf Sound.

The name of the promontory originates from the Manx name for the type of rock in the area, based on the Manx word "speeiney" meaning "bark", "strip" or "peel" reflecting the natural fissility of the slate on the promontory. The Manx word for "Spain" is a similar word "Spaainey" which led to a later folk tale linking the name to a myth of a ship from the Spanish Armada becoming wrecked in the area, though there is no archaeological evidence, or written accounts to support such a wreck, and the route of the Armada did not pass through the Irish Sea.
