= Douglas Head Amphitheatre =

Coordinates: 54.1421°N 4.4690°W

Douglas Head Amphitheatre today

Douglas Head Amphitheatre is a structure on the promontory of Douglas Head on the Isle of Man.

At the turn of the 20th century the Isle of Man was a hugely popular holiday destination with the working class factory workers from the northerly part of England and Douglas Head had many attractions, most of which have long since disappeared. One such attraction was the amphitheatre which remains in situ today after many years of neglect. On this stage there took place many shows including minstrels, pierrots, etc., all of which were ideal forms of entertainment to the discerning holidaymaker to the island and the popularity of the shows can be seen from the large number of concrete steps still extant which formed the seating (although wooden slats were once added to this). Cine footage exists of these entertainments but the popularity of the headland as a destination never really picked up after the war, with several of the other attractions being closed in 1939 and never re-opening, most notably the spectacular tramway which ran on the roadway alongside the stage. Although not used for a great number of years, the stage area was still periodically maintained, receiving a coat of paint every so often.

== Isle of Man Film Festival 2015 ==
Until 2015 the amphitheatre had lain disused since the last organised entertainment which had taken place on the site in 1993 as part of the island's Year Of Railways in celebration of the centenary of the Manx Electric Railway.

The use of the amphitheatre was revived as part of the 2015 Isle of Man Film Festival. Used as the venue for the opening night of the festival, the amphitheatre played host to a screening of the cult film The Goonies, with those in attendance including the film critic Mark Kermode. Judged a success, it is hoped that the future screening of films under the stars during the summer months will lead to a new lease of life for the venue.

== See also ==
- Douglas Head
- Manx Radio
- Douglas Southern Electric Tramway
