= Calf Sound =

Body of water off the Isle of Man

Coordinates: 54°03′39″N 4°47′56″W

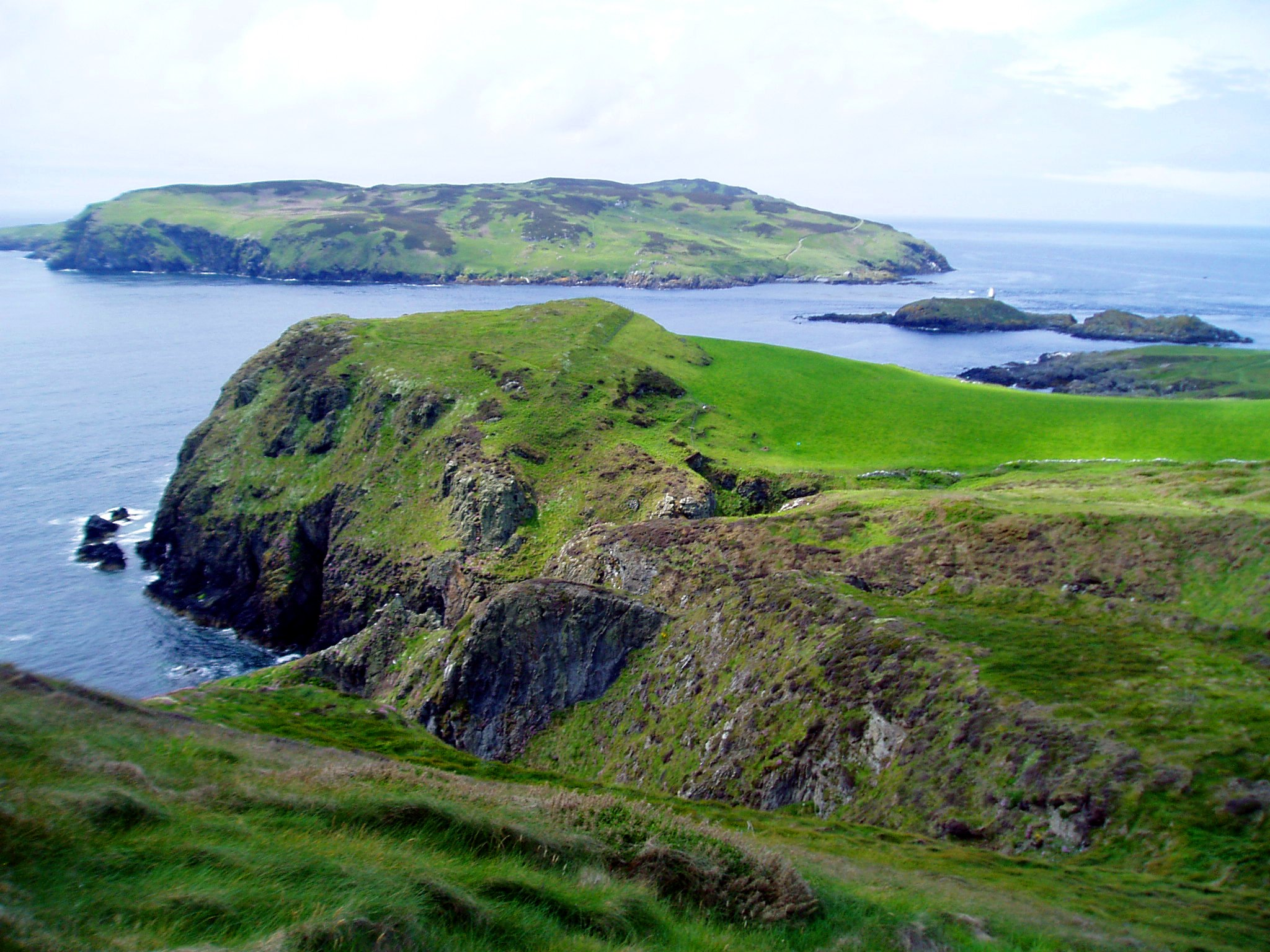
The Calf Sound, looking towards the Calf of Man from the direction of Cregneash

Calf Sound (Manx: Yn Cheyllys) is a body of water which separates the Calf of Man island from the mainland of the Isle of Man. The sound – technically a strait – is about 700 yards (640 m) in width, and contains the small islet of Kitterland, which is home to a large colony of seals.

The name Calf comes from the Old Norse word kalfr, which means a small island close to a larger one.
