= SS Peel Castle =

Passenger streamer from Isle of Man (1894-1939)

History
- Name: Peel Castle formerly Duke of York
- Owner: 1894–1911: Lancashire and Yorkshire Railway Company; 1911–1912: Turkish Owners; 1912–1939: Isle of Man Steam Packet Company
- Operator: 1894–1911: Lancashire and Yorkshire Railway Company; 1912–1939: IomSPCo.
- Port of registry: Douglas, Isle of Man
- Builder: William Denny and Brothers, Dumbarton
- Yard number: 480
- Launched: 20 February 1894
- In service: 1894
- Out of service: 1939
- Identification: British Official Number 104233
- Fate: Sold for breaking

General characteristics
- Type: Packet Steamer
- Tonnage: 1,473 gross register tons (GRT)
- Length: 310 ft (94 m)
- Beam: 37 ft (11 m)
- Depth: 16 ft (4.9 m)
- Installed power: 4,100 horsepower
- Speed: 17 knots (20 mph)
- Capacity: 1,162 passengers
- Crew: 42

The passenger steamer SS Peel Castle was operated by the Isle of Man Steam Packet Company from her purchase in 1912 until she was sold for breaking in 1939.

== Construction and dimensions ==
Peel Castle was built as Duke of York at Dumbarton by William Denny and Brothers, who also supplied her engines and boilers. She had a registered tonnage of 1,473 GRT; length 310 feet; beam 37 feet; draught 16 feet and a design speed of 17 knots.

Peel Castle had accommodation for 1,162 passengers, and a crew of 42.

== Pre-war service ==
As Duke of York she entered service in 1894 on the joint Fleetwood - Belfast service of the Lancashire & Yorkshire Railway and the London & North Western Railway. In 1911, she was sold to the "Turkish Patriotic Committee". In 1912 the Isle of Man Steam Packet Company purchased her and renamed her Peel Castle; the company also purchased Duke of Lancaster, renamed The Ramsey.

== War service ==
She was requisitioned by the Admiralty at the outbreak of war in 1914.

She was fitted out as an Armed Boarding Vessel (ABV) by Cammell Laird in late November 1914. She was to have 100 officers and crew and was fitted out as an auxiliary, capable of carrying boarding parties and prize crews, and was put under the command of Lieutenant-Commander P. E. Haynes RNR

Peel Castle sailed under the White Ensign in January 1915, her engine room manned mostly by Steam Packet Company personnel, and became part of the Downs Boarding Flotilla, a section of the Dover Patrol. She remained with the Patrol for three years and one month.

She would spend ten days at sea and four days in port at Dover. She was mainly tasked with regulating the large amount of maritime traffic between the Kent coast and the Goodwin Sands and to act as one of the guard ships that would stop and examine all neutral shipping proceeding to Continental ports. For the duration of the war the Dover Strait was closed by anti-submarine nets and minefields. No ship could pass except through the Patrol, and at one stage British warships were intercepting, searching and marshalling up to 115 vessels a day.

In this strenuous work, Peel Castle played a busy and successful part. She was first fired upon by a retreating merchantman, and then at least once by British shore batteries. She endured many air raids and sent boarding parties onto many ships. Her crew captured a number of enemy personnel who were trying to get back to Europe hidden in neutral ships, including Franz von Rintelen, an infamous agent of Admiral Tirpitz.

In 1916 she was badly damaged by fire and had to be refitted at Chatham. Later she transferred to the Orkney Islands. After having been fitted with depth charge throwers and paravanes and with her boat deck extended as a landing for kite balloons, she patrolled north of Shetland.

Peel Castle was next moved to the Humber-Tyne Patrol, an area where shipping was very concentrated and where losses had been heavy. With her observer aloft in the balloon she would cruise up and down the convoys, looking for enemy submarines.

The war over, Peel Castle was refitted once more, this time as a troop carrier, work she continued until May 1919, after which she returned to Liverpool and resumed her peacetime Steam Packet Company duties.

== Post-war service ==
Upon returning to the Steam Packet fleet, Peel Castle was mainly used for subsidiary winter services. She undertook the direct Friday sailing from Liverpool to Ramsey, and also excursion trips and cargo duties.

On the morning of Saturday 7 June 1924, Peel Castle went aground in Douglas Bay. She had left Liverpool operating the midnight sailing, and had approximately 550 passengers embarked. As she approached Douglas, Peel Castle encountered a bank of fog which forced her to slow her speed. Steaming at minimal speed, Peel Castle continued inbound to Douglas, sounding her whistle continuously, but ran aground on a bank of sand in the middle of Douglas foreshore. The impact was reported to be so slight that passengers were unaware of the situation until members of the ship's company informed them of the development.

As the tide receded and the fog began to lift, a large crowd gathered on the shore. Passengers remained on board Peel Castle until she refloated. Shortly after 13:00hrs the vessel was refloated, aided by the Fenella, and then proceeded to Douglas Harbour under her own power.

No apparent damage could be seen so Peel Castle left Douglas the following day, bound for the Graving Dock at Cammell Laird's in order to be inspected by representatives of Lloyd's of London. No damage was found on the subsequent inspection, and Peel Castle returned to service.

== Disposal ==
Peel Castle was retired after a service life of 45 years. She was broken up at Dalmuir on the Clyde in February 1939.
