= Douglas Head =

Headland on the Isle of Man

Coordinates: 54°08′35″N 4°28′00″W

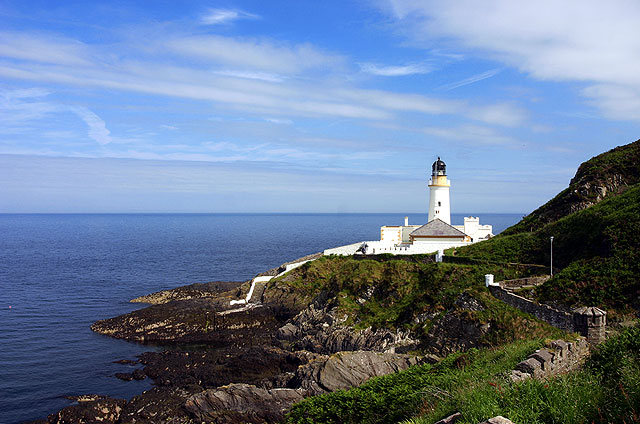
The second (and current) Douglas Head lighthouse looking in a southerly direction

Douglas Head (Manx: Kione Ghoolish) is a rocky point on the Isle of Man overlooking Douglas Bay and harbour. Views extend to include Snaefell Mountain and Laxey.

== General ==
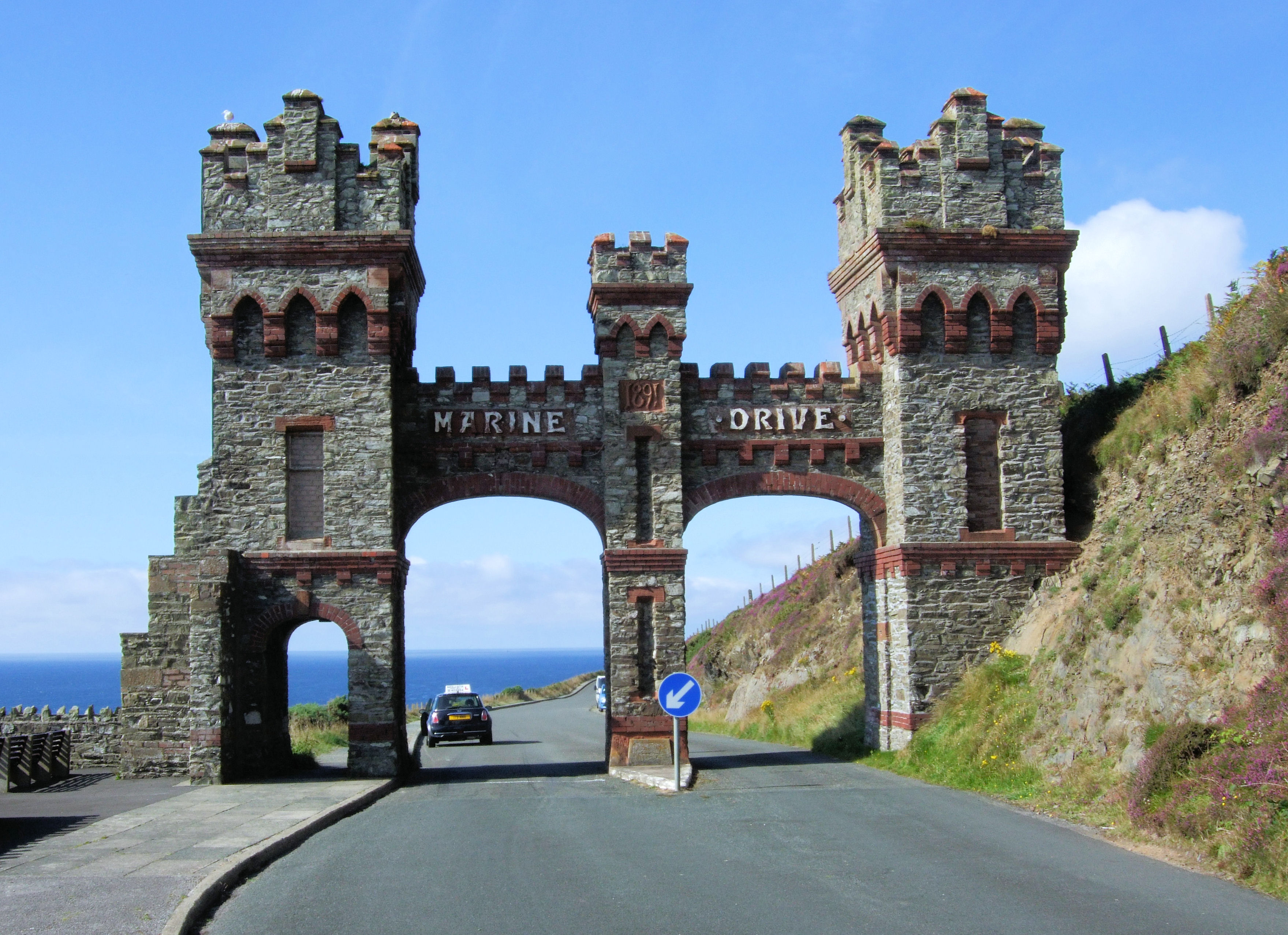
Former toll gate on Marine Drive, which leads to Douglas Head.

Until 1870, the headland was owned by The Nunnery Estate when Sir John Goldie-Taubman gave part of it to 'the people of Douglas' by donating it to Douglas Town Council. The headland was a popular area during the Victorian tourism period with access available via South Quay or by using the three steam ferries of Douglas Harbour Ferry Service.

== Current facilities ==
- Douglas Head Lighthouse
- Manx Radio

== Historic facilities ==
The amphitheatre remains in situ but has been unused for many years

Lower remnant of the funicular railway which ran alongside the stairs to near the Camera Obscura (upper left)

- Douglas Head Amphitheatre
- Douglas Head Hotel
- Great Union Camera Obscura
- The Black Mast
- Warwick Tower
- Douglas Head Funicular Railway
- Douglas Head Marine Drive Railway
- Port Skillicon Pool
- Douglas Head Restaurant

== Memorials ==
Douglas Head is home to three memorials:

- A statue of RNLI founder and Isle of Man resident Sir William Hillary who was the man behind the building of the Tower of Refuge on Conister Rock
- A large stone anchor is dedicated to the contribution and sacrifice made by Manx people during the Battle of Trafalgar and was placed on the headland marking the bi-centenary of that event
- A granite bollard and plinth from the harbourside in the Isle of Whithorn, giving thanks from the families and friends of those lost their lives in the Solway Harvester whose bodies were recovered by the Manx Government contrary to previous maritime tradition

== Trivia ==
- During the Second World War Douglas Head was the location of a major radar station called HMS Valkyrie
- Extensive radar research, development and training of systems and operators took place here
- Manx Radio, broadcasting from the head, was the first licensed independent station in the British Isles
- Marine Drive was a toll road, and the impressive arched gateway was the toll gate
- Evidence of the tramway exists in the landside arch where the overhead cable was attached to the stonework
- The road runs the full length of Marine Drive however is closed to through traffic due to rock instability
- Sections of the 1999 film Waking Ned were filmed on Marine Drive
