= Whitestone Bank =

Coordinates: 54.4°N 4.3167°W

- Location within the Isle of Man
- Crown dependency: Isle of Man

The Whitestone Bank is a sand bank approximately 1 mi (0.87 nmi; 1.6 km) east of The Point of Ayre, Isle of Man. The Whitestone Channel separates the island from the bank.

== Description ==
The bank is denoted on maritime chart AC 2094 Kirkcudbright to the Mull of Galloway & Isle of Man; AC 1826 Irish Sea Eastern Part; AC 2696 Ramsey Harbour; SC 5613.21.1 Isle of Man East Coast. Ramsey; Imray C62 Irish Sea; Imray Y70 Isle of Man (Harbour Plan of Ramsey).

The currents around the Point of Ayre have, over the millennia formed a series banks stretching out to the east which, it is advised, should be avoided especially in heavy weather when the seas break over them. There is also a problem in that chart depths on the west coast to the southwest of the Point of Ayre are based on Victorian lead line surveys and are no longer accurate, there being reports of depths as much as 2 meters less than that expected. For mariners approaching Ramsey from the north, it is suggested that the best course of action is to come in north of the Strunakill Bank then tight to the Point of Ayre. This allows the mariner to slip inside the Whitestone Bank, through the Whitestone Channel. Alternatively, if coming up from Peel, it is advisable to stand off Rue Point (southwest of Ayre) and then shape a course to pass between the Strunakill Bank and the Point. Going outside the Whitestone Bank to the east of the Point of Ayre involves committing the mariner to an unnecessarily long passage around the Bahama Bank.

Other notable sandbars and banks in the area are the Ballacash Bank, the King William Bank, the Strunakill Bank and the Bahama Bank.
