= Maughold Head =

Coordinates: 54.2957°N 4.3094°W

Maughold Head: Manx: Kione Maghal
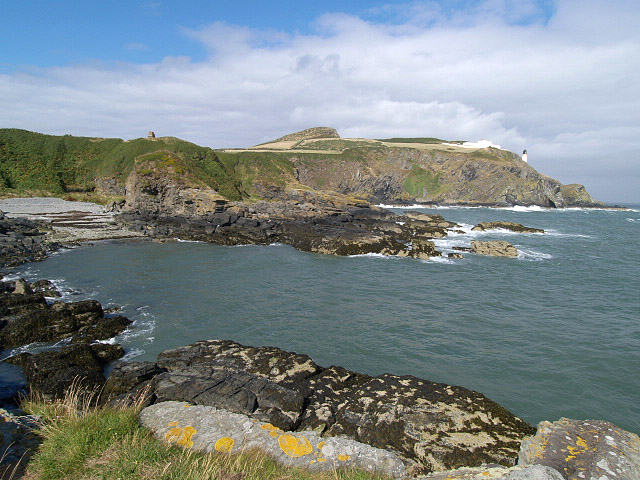
- Maughold Head lighthouse.

- Location within the Isle of Man
- OS grid reference: SC492917
- Parish: Maughold
- Sheading: Garff
- Crown dependency: Isle of Man
- Post town: ISLE OF MAN
- Dialling code: 01624
- Police: Isle of Man
- Fire: Isle of Man
- Ambulance: Isle of Man

Maughold Head is the easternmost point of the Isle of Man and the closest point in the Isle of Man to England, being 50 kilometres (31 mi) from St. Bees Head in Cumbria.

Maughold Head lies in the northeast of the island, some 5 kilometres (3 mi) from Ramsey, at the southern end of Ramsey Bay.

== Maughold Head lighthouse ==
Located at the very end of the headland is the Maughold Head Lighthouse which was built in 1914. Although now unmanned, it continues to be operated by the Northern Lighthouse Board.
