= Calf of Man =

Island off the coast of the Isle of Man

Native name: Yn Cholloo
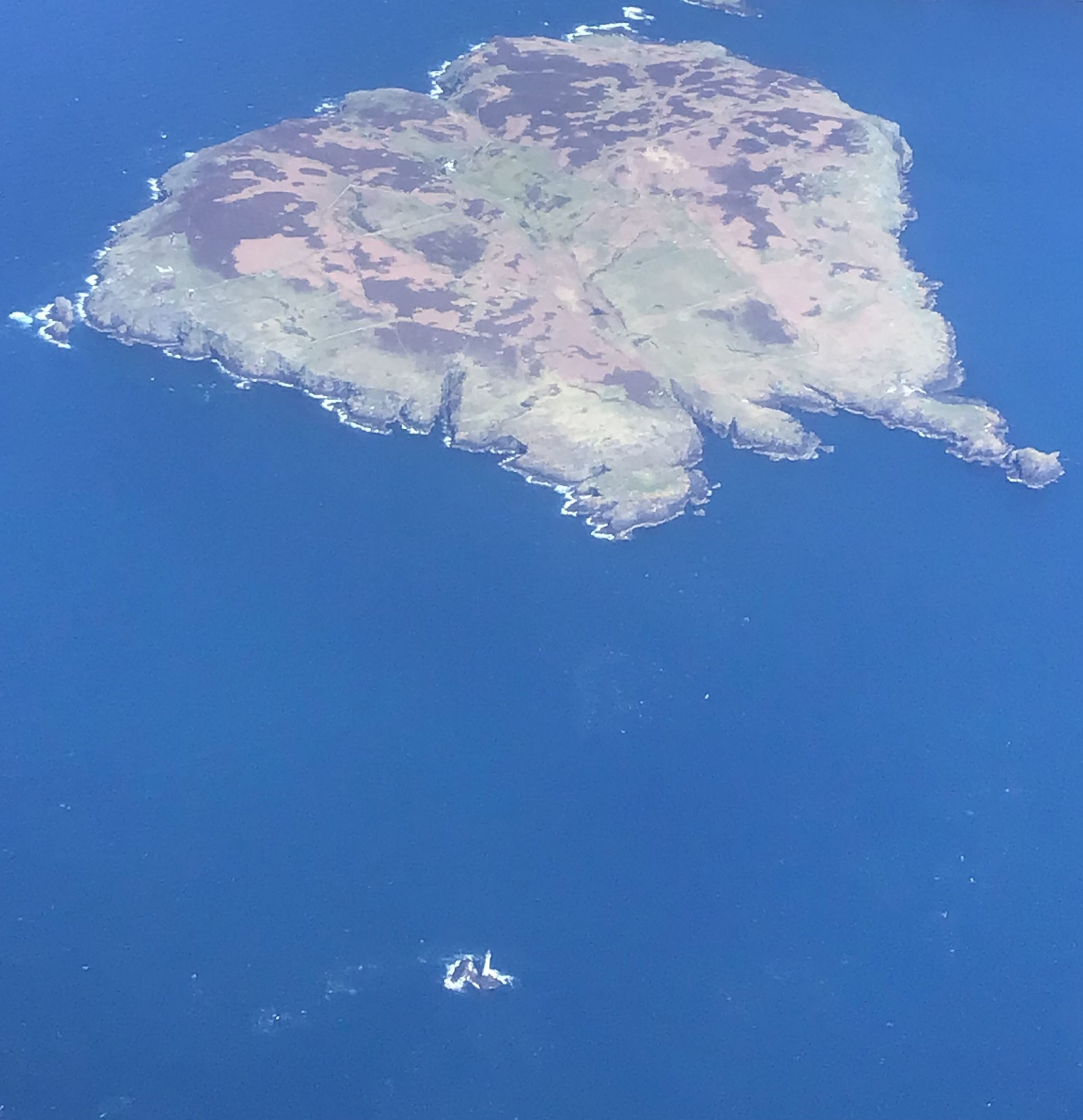
- The Calf of Man with Chicken Rock

- Location within Isle of Man

Geography
- Location: Isle of Man
- Coordinates: 54°03′10″N 4°49′13″W
- Area: 250 ha (620 acres)
- Highest elevation: 128 m (420 ft)
- Highest point: Bushell's House on Or Vooar

Demographics
- Population: 2 (March to November)
- Pop. density: 1.2/km^{2} (3.1/sq mi)

Calf of Man (Manx: Yn Cholloo [ə ˈxɑːlu]) is a 2.50-square-kilometre (618-acre) island, off the southwest coast of the Isle of Man. It is separated from the Isle of Man by a narrow stretch of water called the Calf Sound.

Like the nearby rocky islets of Chicken Rock and Kitterland, it is part of the historic parish of Rushen and the current parish district of Arbory and Rushen. It has only two seasonal inhabitants. The word 'calf' derives from the Old Norse word kalfr, which means a small island lying near a larger one. One can reach the Calf of Man by boat from either Port Erin or Port St Mary. Cow Harbour and South Harbour are the main landing places. The highest part of the island is in the west where an unnamed peak reaches 126 m (415 ft) above sea level.

Until 1939, the island was under private ownership by the Keig family, but the island was purchased by Mr F. J. Dickens of Silverdale, Lancashire, who then donated it to the National Trust for it to become a bird sanctuary. In 1951, the Manx Museum & National Trust, which became known as Manx National Heritage, was established. Manx National Heritage then rented the Calf from the National Trust for a nominal £1 per year, until 1986, when ownership was transferred. In 2006 Manx National Heritage employed the charity Manx Wildlife Trust as the Calf Warden Service Provider, but it retains ownership.

The island has been a bird observatory since 1959, and welcomes visits from volunteers and ornithologists. The observatory is able to accommodate up to eight visitors in basic self-catering accommodation, which can be booked through Manx National Heritage.

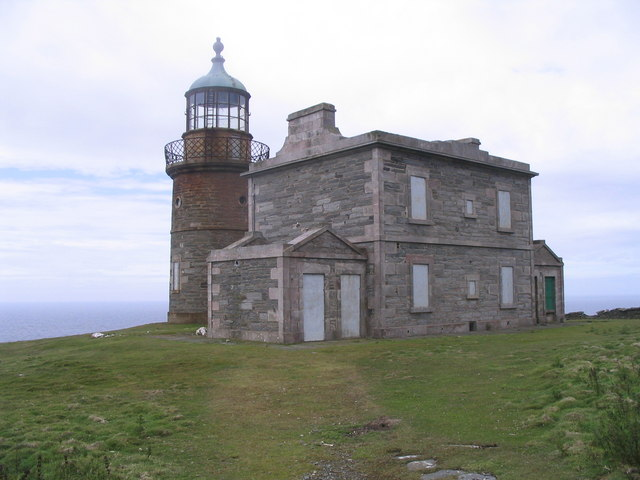
Calf of Man, Lower Lighthouse. One of two built by Robert Stevenson in 1818 to steer ships clear of Chicken Rock; now disused.

The Calf of Man and its offshore rocks have no fewer than four lighthouses: two lighthouses were built in 1818 under the Isle of Man and Calf of Man Lighthouses Act 1815 (55 Geo. 3. c. lxvii) by Robert Stevenson to warn mariners of the hazards of the Chicken Rock off the south end of the Calf. These were replaced in 1875 by a lighthouse built on the Chicken Rock itself. In 1968, a third lighthouse was built on the Calf after a severe fire destroyed the Chicken Rock light. The Chicken Rock lighthouse was later rebuilt. There are two minor, unfenced roads on the island, and two very short streams.

Between the Isle of Man and the Calf is the islet of Kitterland, while the islets of The Burroo and The Stack lie close to the Calf's shore. The southern shore of the island encloses a small bay called The Puddle. Almost a mile southwest of the Calf is Chicken Rock, the most southerly part of the Isle of Man's territory.

Calf of Man is home to a breeding population of Manx shearwaters, a seabird which derives its name from its presence in Manx waters. The Calf of Man also has a large colony of seals which live and breed on the rocky coastline.
