= Registered building (Isle of Man) =

Protected historic structure in the Isle of Man

A registered building is the Isle of Man equivalent of a listed building in the United Kingdom.

Registered Buildings of the Isle of Man lists them.
