= Point of Ayre =

Northernmost point of the Isle of Man

Coordinates: 54.4157°N 4.3681°W

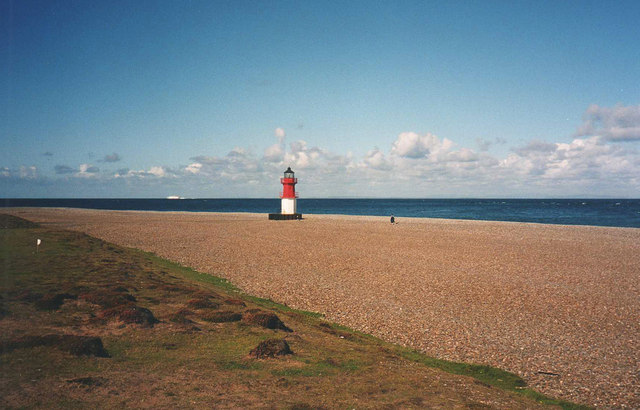
- Point of Ayre and 'Winkie' lighthouse

- Location within the Isle of Man
- Crown dependency: Isle of Man

The Point of Ayre (Manx: Kione ny Hayrey) is the northernmost point of the Isle of Man. It lies at the northern end of Ramsey Bay 6 miles (10 km) north of the town of Ramsey. The point can be accessed by the A16 road from Bride. Point of Ayre lighthouse, the oldest lighthouse on the Isle of Man, is located here.

It is the closest point on the Isle of Man to Great Britain, being 16 miles (26 km) south of Burrow Head in Scotland.

The name Ayre comes from the Norse word eyrr meaning gravel bank. Strong currents offshore cause an ever-changing build-up of shingle, so that the beach changes shape with each tide.

The tidal range at the Point of Ayre provides excellent fishing from the beach. Visitors are attracted by the gorse and heather which surrounds the lighthouse and merges with sand dunes stretching to the south-west, providing cover for rare wild flowers and forming part of a Manx National Heritage Nature Reserve. A variety of land and sea birds visit the area throughout the year, as do a number of grey seals.

== See also ==
- Whitestone Bank
- Strunakill Bank
- Ballacash Bank
- King William Banks
