= Ballacash Bank =

The Ballacash Bank is a sand bank northeast of the Point of Ayre, Isle of Man.

The bank is denoted on maritime charts and marked with the West Cardinal Buoy at position 54°25.59′N 4°13.59′W. The buoy is yellow in colour with a black horizontal band. It is fitted with a light which operates a quick group flash of nine every 10 seconds.
