= Andrew Brown =

Andrew Brown may refer to:

== Arts ==
- Andrew Brown (CNN journalist), British-born journalist in Hong Kong
- Andrew Brown (writer) (born 1955), British writer and journalist
- Andrew Brown (Philadelphia Gazette) (1744–1797), Irish soldier, journalist and congressional reporter
- Andrew Brown (author), South African crime novelist
- Andrew Brown (musician) (1900–1960), American jazz saxophonist

== Sports ==
=== Rugby ===
- Andrew Brown (rugby union, born 10 April 1980), Australian rugby union footballer
- Andrew Brown (rugby union, born 20 April 1980), Welsh rugby union footballer
- Andrew Brown (rugby league) (born 1981), rugby league footballer for Scotland and Fife Lions

=== Other sports ===
- Andrew Brown (footballer, born 1865) (1865–1904), Scottish footballer
- Andrew Brown (soccer, born 1870) (1870–1948), Scottish soccer coach
- Andrew Brown (cricketer, born 1935) (1935–2020), Scottish cricketer and Royal Navy sailor
- Andrew Brown (cricketer, born 1964), English cricketer
- Andrew Brown (sailor) (born 1977), New Zealand sailor
- Andrew Brown (pitcher) (born 1981), American baseball pitcher
- Andrew Brown (outfielder) (born 1984), American baseball outfielder
- Andrew Brown (American football) (born 1995), American football defensive tackle

== Others ==
- Andrew Brown (minister) (1763–1834), Professor of Rhetoric, historian of Nova Scotia
- Andrew Brown (media strategist) (born 1955), Scottish media strategist, former journalist and broadcaster
- Andrew Brown (industrialist) (1797–1894), industrialist and philanthropist, first European settler of the Lithgow Valley, New South Wales, Australia
- Andrew Phillip Brown (born 1951), Australian botanist and taxonomist
- Andrew Gibson Brown (born 1945), HM Chief Inspector of Constabulary for Scotland, 2004–2007
- Andrew Betts Brown (1841–1906), Scottish engineer and inventor

== See also ==
- Andie Brown (born 1955), Anglican Archdeacon of Man (the Isle of Man)
- Andrew Browne (disambiguation)
- Andy Brown (disambiguation)
- Drew Bundini Brown (1928–1987), assistant trainer and cornerman of boxer Muhammad Ali
- Killing of Andrew Brown Jr.
