= Andy Brown =

Andy Brown may refer to:

- Andy Brown (ice hockey) (born 1944), former ice hockey player in the National Hockey League and World Hockey Association
- Andy Brown (engineer) (born 1959), British Indy Racing League winning chief engineer
- Andy Brown (footballer, born 1915) (1915–1973), Scottish footballer for Torquay United
- Andy Brown (footballer, born 1963), English footballer for Tranmere Rovers
- Andy Brown (politician) (born 1972), politician from Austin, Texas
- Andy Brown (footballer, born 1976), Scottish footballer for Hull City
- Andy Brown (rugby league) (born 1981), rugby league footballer
- Andy Brown (singer) (born 1987), lead singer of Lawson

== See also ==
- Andie Brown (born 1955), Anglican Archdeacon of Man (the Isle of Man)
- Andrew Brown (disambiguation)
- Andrew Browne (disambiguation)
