= Herbert Byng Hall =

British Army officer and author

Major Herbert Byng Hall (1805–1883) served in the British Army, reaching the rank of captain. He later worked as a Queen's Messenger. He wrote several books on travel, sport and food, as well as several novels.

== Early life ==
He was born on 21 October 1805 in Oxford, the eighth son of clergyman Charles Henry Hall and Anna Maria Bridget Byng, daughter of John Byng, 5th Viscount Torrington. He was christened at Christ Church on 18 November 1805. His father became Regius Professor of Divinity (1807–1809) and dean of Christ Church (1809–1824). His grandfather, Charles Hall, had been dean of Bocking, Essex. His mother was from a distinguished naval family.

One of his brothers was Percy Francis Hall who joined the Royal Navy and attained the rank of Commander. He was a pacifist who joined the Plymouth Brethren, and in 1833 published a pamphlet justifying his resignation as a naval officer. His younger brother, Arthur, joined the British Army and became a major-general in India. They both attended Westminster School. Another brother, John Cecil Hall, became Archdeacon of Man.

== Career ==
=== Military career ===
On 18 November 1824 he joined the 39th Infantry Regiment as an ensign. He was promoted to lieutenant in 1825 and transferred to the 7th Infantry Regiment in 1826, where he purchased his captaincy in 1830. In 1833 he joined the 62nd Infantry Regiment. He sold his officer's commission on 20 September 1833 and left the regular army. He was admitted to the Freemasons in 1832.

In 1835 he joined the British auxiliary troops in the First Carlist War as aide-de-camp to General De Lacy Evans with the rank of major, but had to return to England at the beginning of 1836 for health reasons. For his war efforts, he was conferred with the knighthood of the military order of St Ferdinand "for having gallantly led on a charge of Lancers during Cordova's late engagement.".

In 1837 he published Spain: And The Seat Of War In Spain, giving an account of the First Carlist War including the political and military situation. He drew on his personal experiences of the culture and landscape.

=== Civilian career ===
In November 1837 he was elected to the Royal Society Of Arts. In 1837 and 1839 he worked in the General Post Office as a surveyor for the Western District. Between 1839 and 1843 he was recorded as surveyor of the General Post Office for the Northern District of Scotland.

Hall retired to private life in the late 1830s and became a writer. His second book, Scenes at Home and Abroad of 1839, contains several stories. The first is set in Elmwood (Budleigh Salterton) in Devon. He went on to write about sports and travel, such as "Highland Sports, and Highland Quarters".

In 1846 he was secretary for the Liverpool and Preston, and Manchester and Southport Railways. In 1850 he was a member of the Royal Commission for the first Universal Exhibition in London. He wrote a book, The West of England and the Exhibition, about his travels. He was present when Queen Victoria stayed at Croxteth Hall in 1851.

=== Queen's Messenger ===
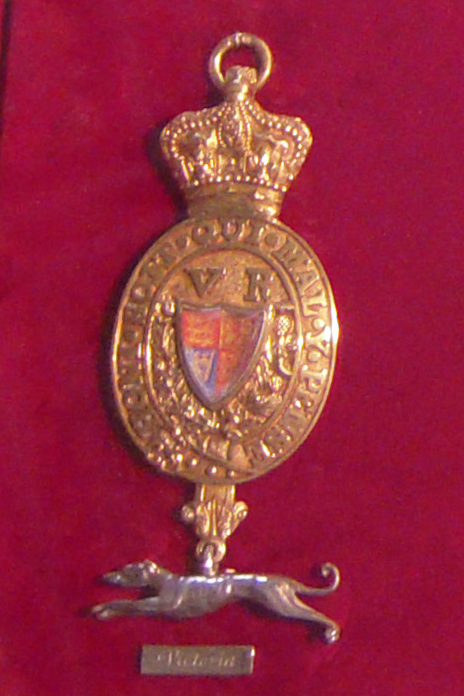
Queen's Messenger badge

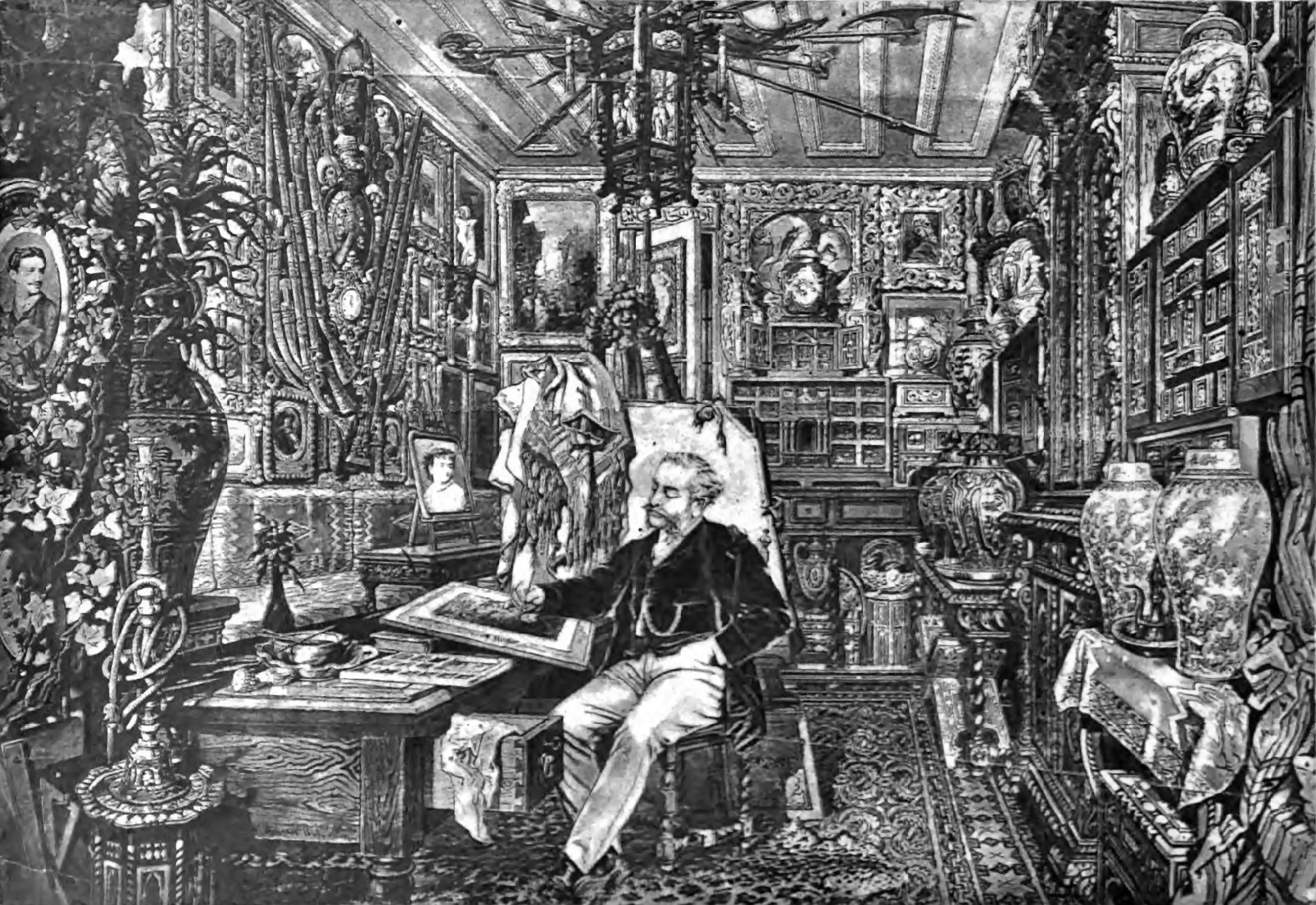
Major Byng Hall at Petersham from The Bric-à-brac Hunter

Between 4 January 1855 to 30 September 1858 he was appointed an extra foreign service messenger on the Constantinople station, at the time of the Crimean War, on a salary of £250 plus 10s a day when travelling and expenses. He had travelled to Constantinople five times between January and August 1855 and was on service when his first wife died in 1856. He escorted Florence Nightingale, who was travelling incognito, back from Constantinople in July 1856. In 1856/57 Hall was paid £380, including 260 days on 8 trips to Constaninople, with over £644 in expenses.

His book Soldiers and Sailors in Peace as in War was first published in 1855 and Sayah or, the Courier to the East in 1856.

He was appointed a Queen's Foreign Service Messenger on 24 January 1859 with a salary of £525. The Queen's Messengers have a badge of office with the Sovereign's Royal Cypher with a silver greyhound below. They are sometimes called the Silver Greyhounds. The Queen's Messengers service dates back over 800 years, securely carrying diplomatic despatches to and from British ambassadors and representatives at foreign courts. They have been under the control of the Foreign Office since 1824.

From July 1861 the Messenger’s salary was settled at £400 a year with a £1 daily allowance when abroad (excluding departures) plus travel expenses. In 1862/63, which includes when he was in the United States, he was away for 295 days, giving him an income of £695. This included travelling between New York and Washington 19 times. In the following years he earned £631 (1863/64), £615 (1864/65) and £592 (1865/66).

He asked to retire in April 1882, citing age and infirmity, and officially retired on 1 July 1882. He was then 76 years old although it had been thought that he was ten years younger. He received a pension of £245 based on a salary of £525. Lord Granville noted that "Major Hall has discharged his duties with diligence and fidelity and to the satisfaction of his official superiors." In October, living in Weston, Bath, he had still not received his pension and requested that they send the forms for him to sign as he was too ill to come to London.

The Strand Magazine mentioned him in their article about the Queen's Messengers.

He wrote about his experiences in his book The Queen's Messenger (1865, 1870), including journeys to Sweden, Denmark, Constantinople, Berlin, St Petersburg, Vienna, Madrid, and New York. Normally bags for the Far East and America were carried by ships captains, either merchant ships or Royal Navy, so a Queen's Messenger carrying despatches to America was unusual, but this was the time of the Trent Affair in 1861-62 and tension in relations. He also gave lectures in Dawlish and Richmond about his travels.

In his book The Bric-à-brac Hunter (1868, 1875) he described his passion for collecting ceramics and antiquities during his travels; the frontispiece shows him in his study in Petersham. In it he confessed: 'I should be almost ashamed to confess how much pleasure these fragile treasures afford me.

He was declared bankrupt in December 1876, when he was living in Petersham. This was annulled in 1880. After his retirement he was declared bankrupt again in April 1883 when living at Glen Rock, Newbridge Hill, Weston.

== Personal life ==
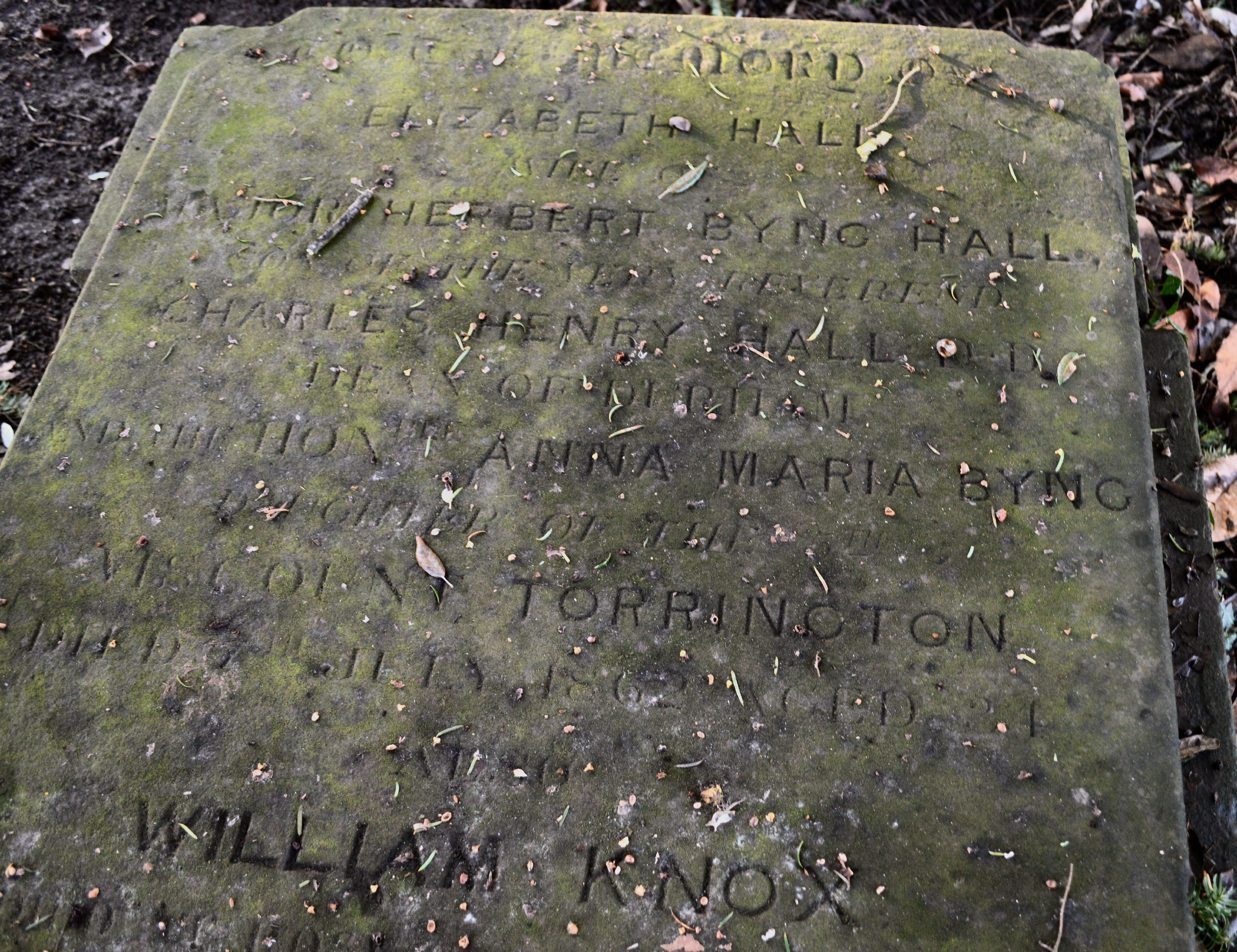
Elizabeth Byng Hall's grave in Petersham

In 1845 he and his first wife Margaret (b. about 1816, Wrotham Park) were living at Budleigh Salterton, Devon, and in the following year at 84 Park Street, Grosvenor Square, London. In 1851 they were living in Bathampton, Somerset. Margaret died on 25 April 1856 at Holcombe, Teignbridge and is buried at St Gregory's Church, Dawlish. As Margaret gave her place of birth as Wrotham Park she could be a cousin of Hall on his mother's side of the family.

His second marriage on 24 July 1857 at Neufchatel, Switzerland, was to Elizabeth Knox (b. 1823, Steeple Ashton), daughter of James Knox of Shirehampton. In 1861 they were living in Petersham at Rose Cottage, River Lane, with relatives of Elizabeth and three servants. They had a son, William Herbert Byng Hall (1859–1893), whose birth was registered in Richmond on 6 June 1859; he was baptised on 10 October at St Vigor's, Fulbourn, Cambridgeshire, which is where his uncle William Knox was a surgeon. Hall lived in Petersham from about 1859, when he was appointed a full Queen's Messenger, to about 1880. Elizabeth died on 7 July 1862 and is buried at St Peter's Church, Petersham together with a sister and her brother. In 1871 William was at junior school at Highbury New Park and Rose Cottage was occupied by two of Elizabeth's sisters. Rose Cottage is probably now known as the Navigator's House, formerly the home of George Vancouver.

On 12 July 1880 he married, a third time, Lydia Braddock (b. 1836, Oldham) at St Mary Magdalene, Richmond. In 1881 the family were at Bowden Villas, 11, Onslow Road, Richmond. He died on 25 April 1883 at Weston, Bath, and was buried in Locksbrook Cemetery, Lower Weston, Bath. His wife Lydia died in 1923.

== Works ==
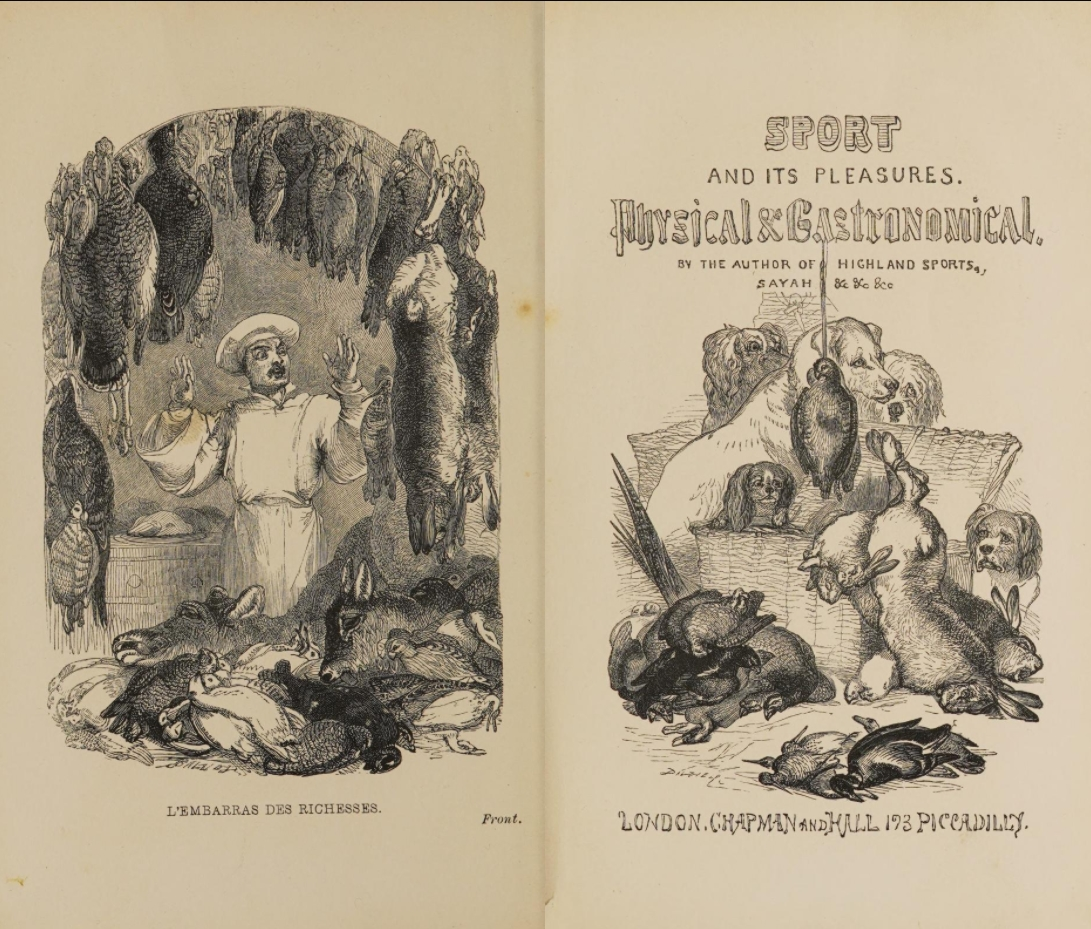

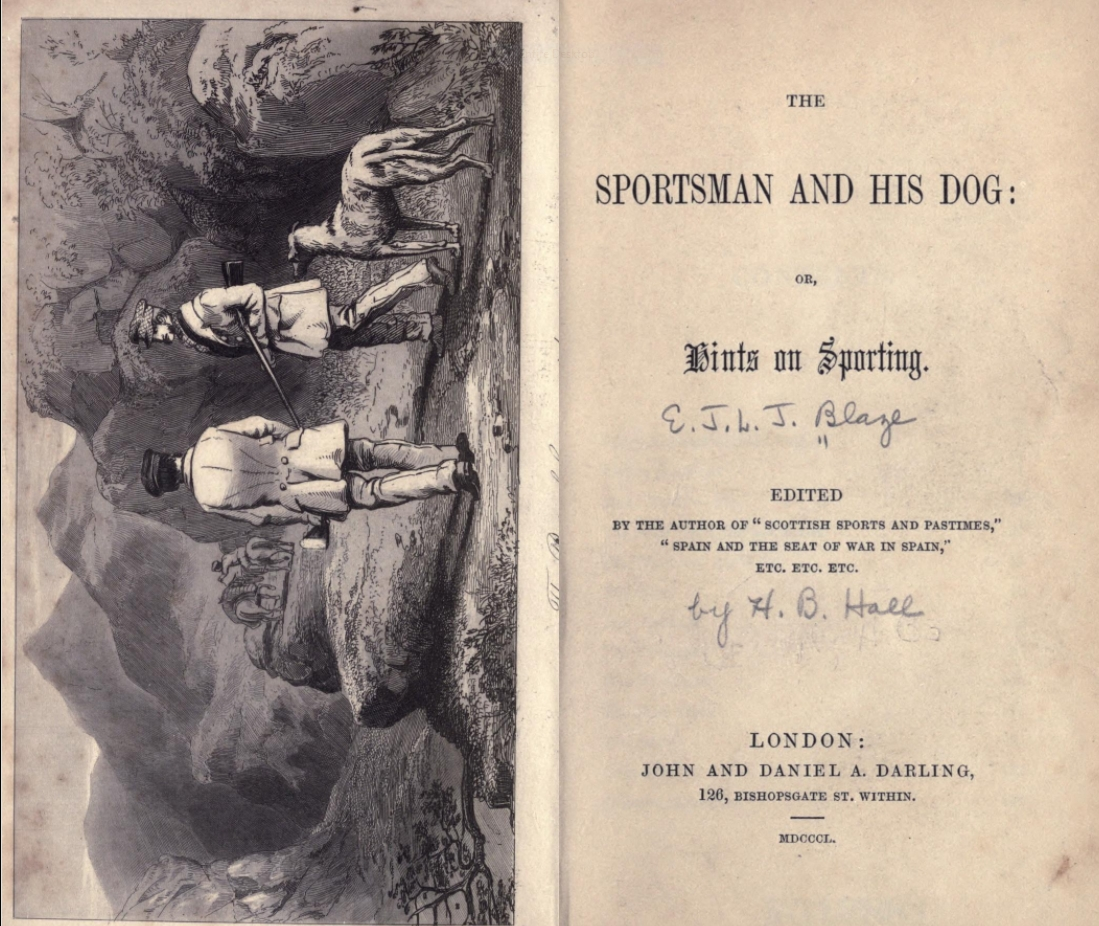

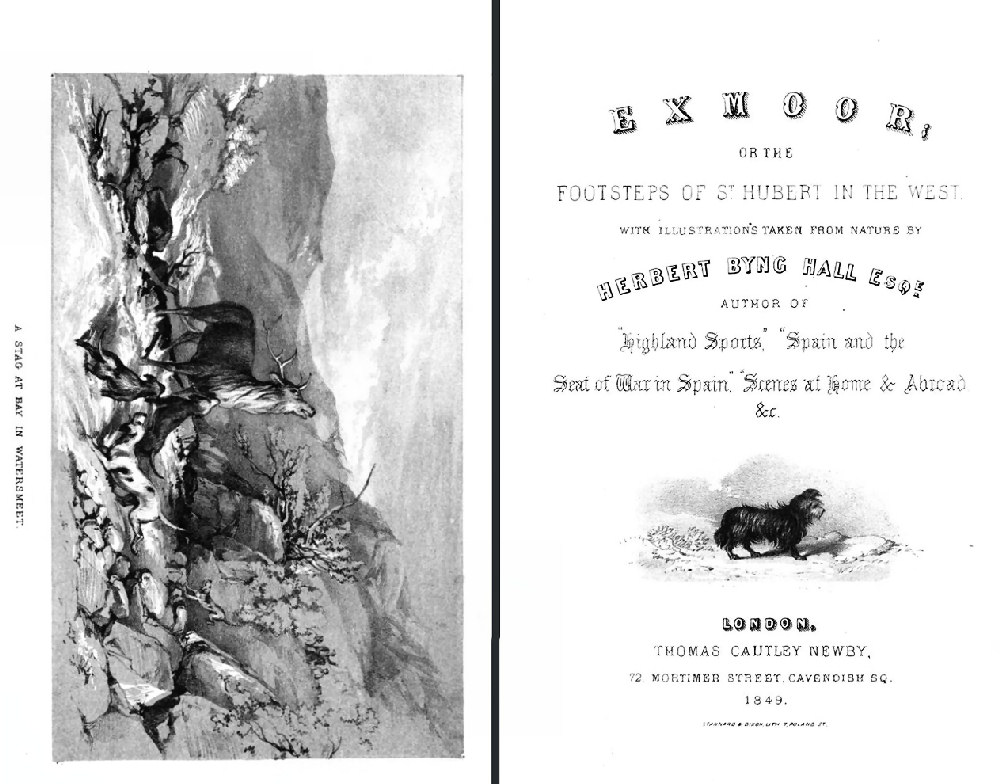

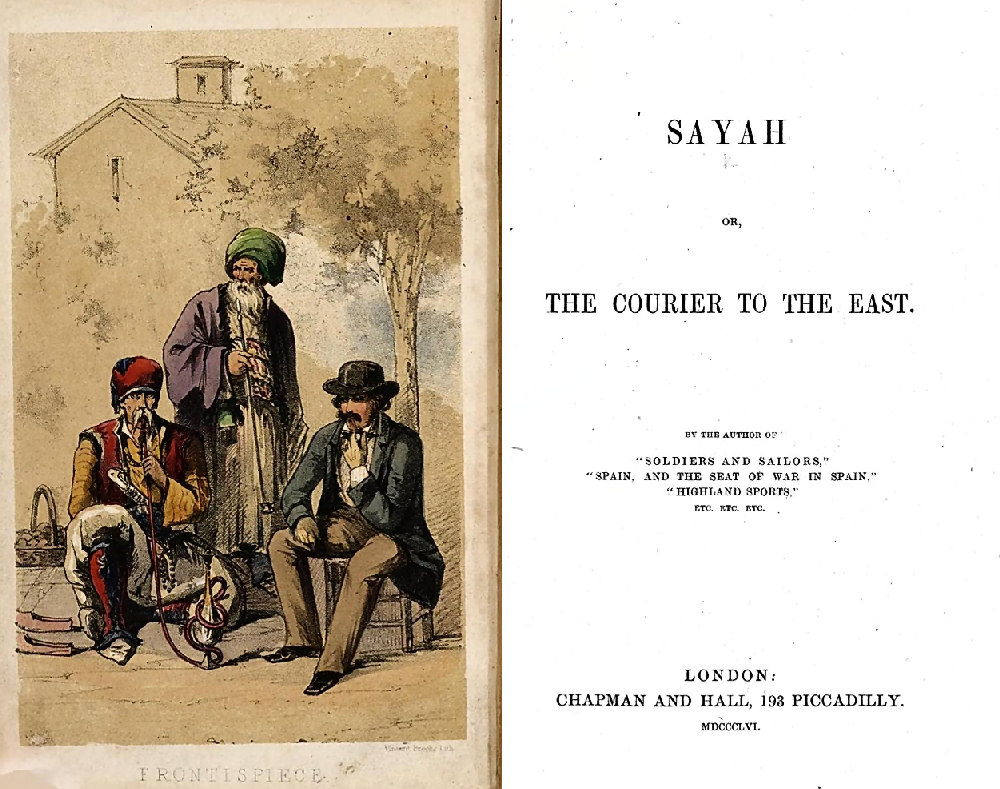

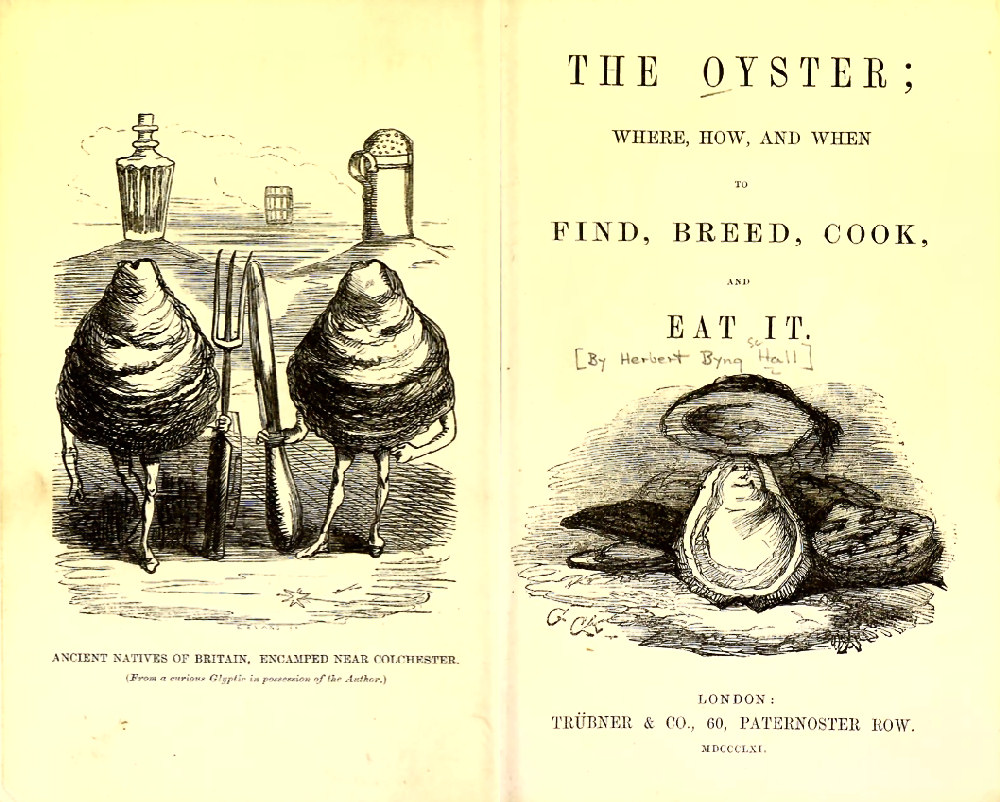
- Spain; and the Seat of War in Spain (1837)
- Scenes at Home and Abroad (1839)
- Highland Sports, and Highland Quarters (2 volumes, 1847, ²1848)
- Exmoor; or the Footsteps of St. Hubert in the West (1849)
- Scottish Sports and Pastimes (1850)
- The Sportsman and His Dog: or, Hints on Sporting (1850)
- The West of England and the Exhibition, 1851 (1851)
- Brooklands; a Sporting Biography (2 volumes, 1852). London: T. C. Newby
- Mary, a Daughter of the English Peasantry. A Novel (3 volumes, 1853). London: T. C. Newby
- Soldiers and Sailors in Peace as in War (1855, ²1869)
- Sayah or, the Courier to the East (1856)
- Sport and its Pleasures, Physical and Gastronomical (1859, ²1868)
- The Oyster: where, how, and when to find, breed, cook, and eat it (1861)
- The Queen's Messenger; or, Travels on the High-ways and Bye-ways of Europe (1865, ²1870)
- The Adventures of a Bric-à-brac Hunter (1868); extended new edition: The Bric-à-brac Hunter; or, Chapters on Chinamania (1875)
- The Pigskins Abroad (1870). London: Ward and Lock
- Lucullus: or, Palatable Essays, in which are merged “The Oyster”, “The Lobster”, and “Sport and its Pleasures” (2 volumes, 1878)
