= Stephen Hughes-Games =

Stephen Herbert Wynn Hughes-Games (1862–1923) was an English chaplain, theologian and poet with strong ties to the Isle of Man.

Hughes-Games was born on 21 March 1862 in Liverpool, the second son of ten children born to Joshua Hughes-Games and his wife, Mary Helena Yates. He attended King William's College, where his father had been principal since 1866. He then attended Worcester College, Oxford, achieving his Honour Moderations in 1883, before returning to the Isle of Man to be lecturer in the Sodor and Man Theological College and Curate of Kirk Andreas, under his father, between 1887 and 88. It was in February 1887 that Hughes-Games’ sister, Louise Elizabeth Wynn, married the Speaker of the House of Keys and leading Manx antiquarian, historian, linguist and folklorist, A. W. Moore.

Bishopscourt, Isle of Man

In 1888 he became Domestic Chaplain to Bishop of Sodor and Man and the Diocesan Inspector of Schools for Sodor and Man, but in 1889 he became principal of the Bishop Wilson Theological College, Isle of Man. The College was based in Bishopscourt, a place which featured in one of Hughes-Games' poems:

O fair green lawns, by rippling water lined,
O'erwatched by tower and fane and ivied walls,
How softly on you now the evening falls
And wakes your leaf-crowned aisles with whispering wind!

In 1890 he moved to London to become Curate of St. Giles, Cripplegate, before moving to become curate of Croydon Parish Church in 1893, the same year in which he obtained by MA from the University of Oxford. It was also in 1893 that he got married, on 27 April at St John's, Notting Hill, London. He was to go on to have two sons. For his wedding day Hughes-Games composed a wedding hymn, which began with the following stanza:

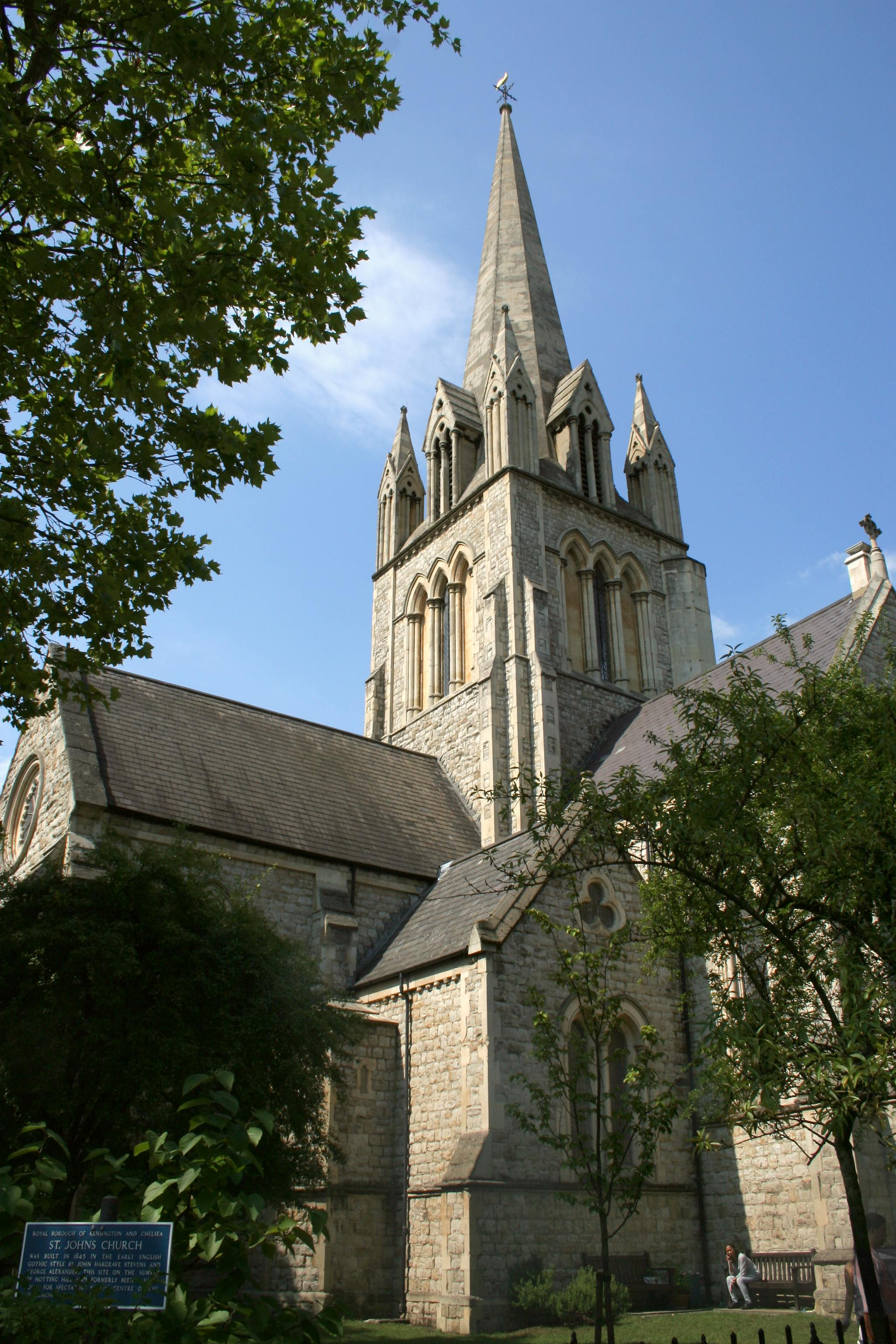
St John's, Notting Hill

O love that lit with glory
Fair Eden long ago –
O love, the star and story
Of life above, below,
Thy light it sprung from heaven,
It flashed in fulness down,
God born, God-blessed, God given,
Of all God's gifts the crown!

After three years in Croydon, Hughes-Games moved to become Vicar of Doddington, Kent in 1896. By 1901 Hughes-Games was Vicar of St. Mary's Birkenhead.

In 1904 Hughes-Games published a collection of poetry, Thekla, and Other Poems, which was judged to be 'worthy of deep admiration' at his death nearly twenty years later. His poem 'In memoriam: T. E. Brown' was selected by William Cubbon for inclusion in his A Book of Manx Poetry, published in 1913, and included the striking stanza:

Poet and Patriot, strong,
Tender and wise,
All notes were in thy song,
Mirth in thine eyes.

Hughes-Games moved to St. Lawrence, Thanet, in 1906, and in around 1908 he moved to a new position in Clifton, Bristol. It was here that he died on 16 May 1923.
