= Joseph Moore (priest) =

Joseph Christian Moore, MA (5 November 1802 – 26 February 1886) was archdeacon of Man from 17 April 1844 until his death.

Moore was educated at St Edmund Hall, Oxford, where he matriculated in 1823, and graduated B.A. in 1827. After a curacy at Measham he was for many years the incumbent at Kirk Andreas.
