= William Tayler =

British colonial administrator and artist

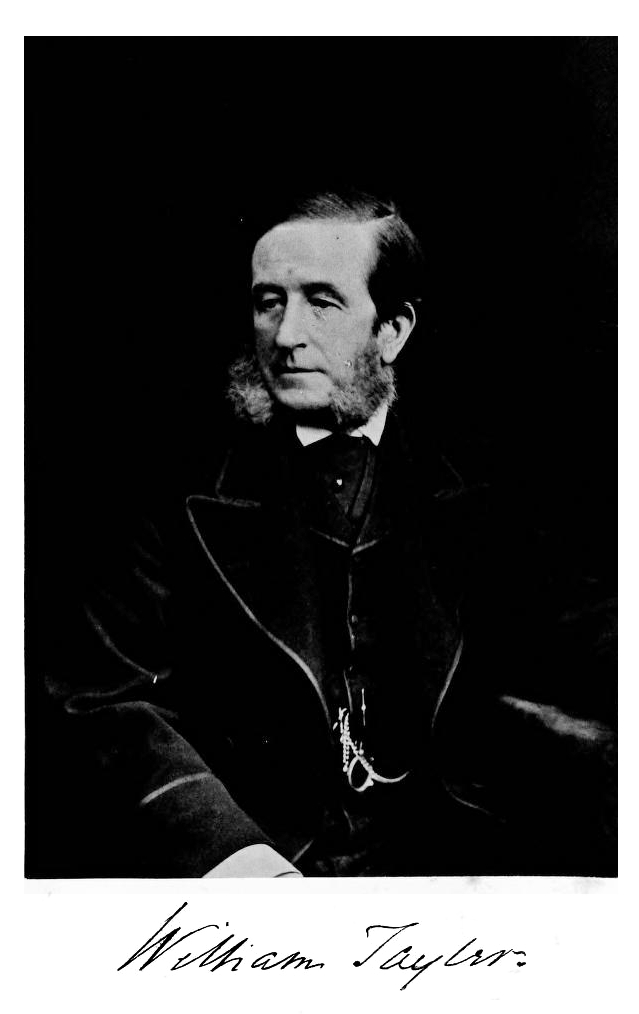
Photograph of Tayler

William Tayler (8 April 1808 – 8 March 1892) was a British colonial administrator and artist who was employed by the East India Company in British India from 1829 until 1867. He became commissioner of Patna in 1855 and in 1857 was involved in the suppression of the 1857 Sepoy Mutiny. His measures against the local people were regarded as excessively harsh by his superiors, and he was suspended and given an appointment of lower rank.

== Life and work ==
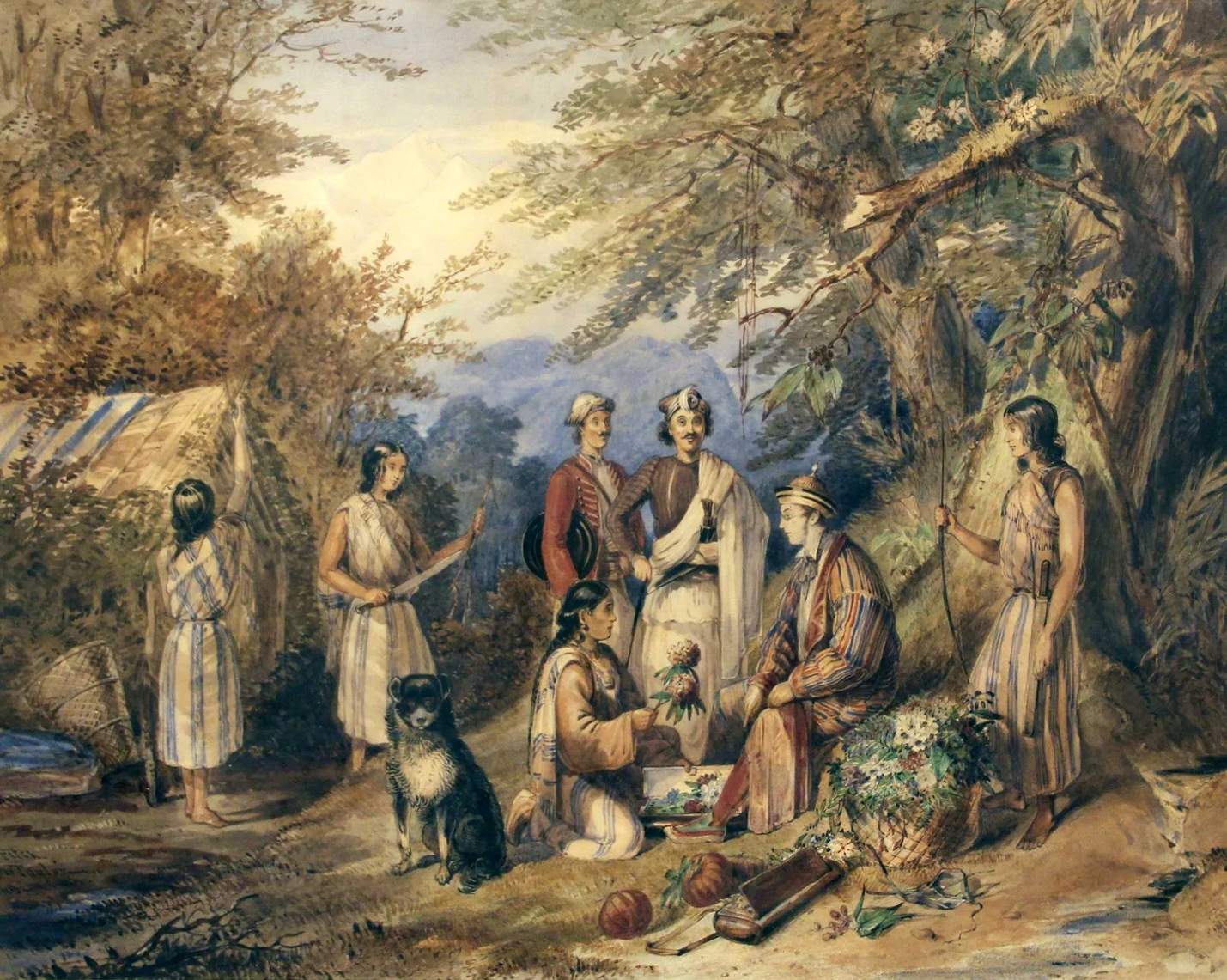
A painting depicting Lepchas bringing plant specimens to J.D. Hooker in Darjeeling made by Walter Hood Fitch based on an illustration by William Tayler

Tayler was born in Elstree, Hertfordshire, the son of Archdale Wilson Tayler. His maternal uncle was Charles Henry Hall and an older brother Frederick Tayler became a noted artist. He was educated at Charterhouse and matriculated from Christ Church, Oxford in 1828. He then became a writer in the East India Company in 1829. He worked at Cuttack in 1830 and after holding various positions in Bengal, he was made commissioner at Patna in 1855. After the 1857 uprising, he was accused of executing many people without sufficient evidence. He was suspended on 26 January 1859 and he resigned on the 29 March 1859. He retired and started a legal agency, working in Bengal courts until 1867. He returned to England and lived there until his death in St. Leonards. He was married to Charlotte, daughter of John Palmer, in Calcutta, in 1830. Two of his sons Skipwith Henry Churchill and William Vansittart Tayler served in the Bengal civil service.

An amateur artist, Tayler sketched and painted landscapes, scenes from everyday life, and the court, military, and daily dress of Indians from different walks of life. Sketches Illustrating the Manners and Customs of the Indians and Anglo Indians Drawn on Stone from the Original Drawings from Life, published in London in 1842, included six of his drawings. In 1881 and 1882, Tayler published a two-volume autobiography, Thirty-Eight Years in India, illustrated with 100 of his own drawings.

In a watercolour he portrayed the rajah of Burdwan, in West Bengal. This was probably Mahtab Chand, who was born in 1820 and was rajah from 1832 until his death in 1879. He was regarded by the British as an enlightened and loyal ruler. The painting is part of the Anne S.K. Brown Military Collection at the Brown University Library.
