= Jeffrey Quill =

British test pilot (1913–1996)

Jeffrey Kindersley Quill OBE, AFC, FRAeS
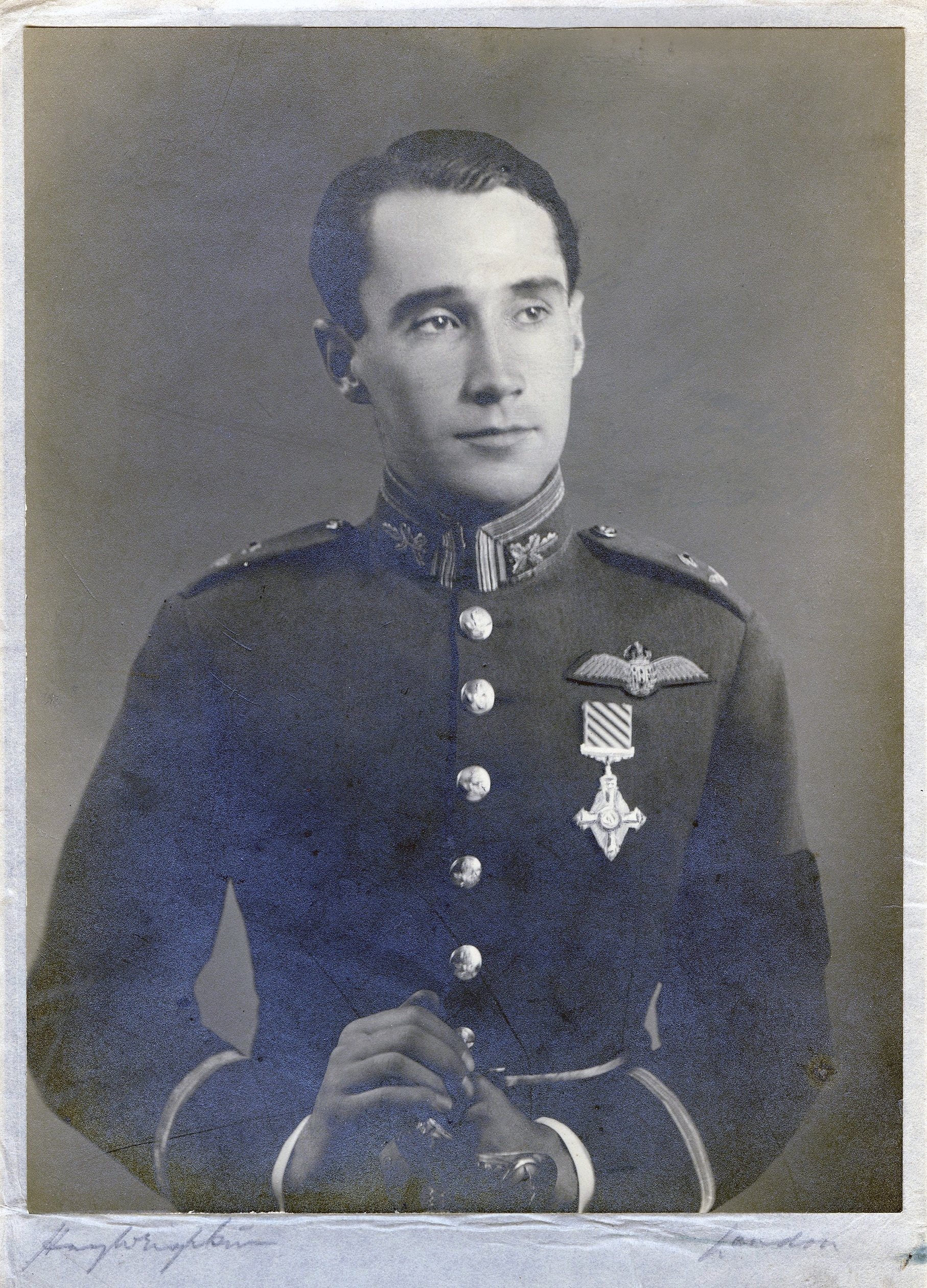
- Quill, wearing his Air Force Cross
- Born: 1 February 1913; Littlehampton, Sussex
- Died: 20 February 1996 (aged 83); Andreas, Isle of Man
- Military career
- Allegiance: United Kingdom
- Branch: Royal Air Force; Royal Naval Volunteer Reserve
- Service years: 1931–1936; 1940; 1943–1944
- Rank: Lieutenant Commander
- Units: No. 17 Squadron RAF; No. 65 Squadron RAF
- Conflicts: Second World War: Battle of Britain
- Awards: Officer of the Order of the British Empire; Air Force Cross

Jeffrey Kindersley Quill, OBE, AFC, FRAeS (1 February 1913 – 20 February 1996) was a British test pilot who served on secondment with the Royal Air Force and Royal Naval Volunteer Reserve during the Second World War. He was also the second man to fly the Supermarine Spitfire after Vickers Aviation's chief test pilot, Joseph "Mutt" Summers. After succeeding Summers as Vickers' chief test pilot, Quill test-flew every mark of Spitfire. Quill's work on the aircraft aided its development from a promising but untried prototype to become, with the Hawker Hurricane, an instrument of the Royal Air Force's victory in the Battle of Britain. The Spitfire later played a leading role in gaining Allied air superiority over Europe. Quill later wrote two books about the Spitfire.

== Early years ==
Quill was born at Littlehampton, Sussex, the youngest of the five children of Arthur Maxwell Quill and Emily Molesworth Kindersley. He was educated at Lancing College, which overlooked Shoreham aerodrome, at that time a small grass field with old hangars and a wooden hut for a flying club. While at Lancing, Quill became Captain of Gibbs House (1930) and Prefect (1931). He played in the Cricket XI (1930–31); Football XI (1929–30); and was Sergeant in the Officers' Training Corps, Cert. A. Long before he left school in 1931, the nearby aerial activity had prompted Quill to seek a non-commissioned career in the Royal Air Force. While still a pupil at Lancing, he attended the famous annual RAF displays at Hendon. Two years later he participated in the event.

== Aviation career ==
At the age of 18, Quill was accepted into the Royal Air Force as an acting pilot officer. He learned to fly on Avro Tutor biplanes at No. 3 Flying Training School at Grantham, and went solo after the short time of 5 hours 20 minutes (9 hours being regarded as the norm). He graduated to Siskin IIIA advanced trainers, and his flying ability was assessed as exceptional. In September 1932 he joined No. 17 Squadron RAF at Upavon, where he began flying Bristol Bulldog fighters. While with 17 Squadron he took part in the Royal Air Force display at Hendon in June 1933, demonstrating low flying in a mock bombing attack. He flew as often as possible to familiarise himself with the aeroplane, practising aerobatics and flying in cloud. The squadron also carried out service trials of new fighters in support of the Aeroplane and Armament Experimental Establishment, with Quill taking part in the squadron's evaluation of the Armstrong Whitworth A.W.16. He was well aware of the dangers of flying and later wrote:

Unless aerobatics were practised assiduously to the point where one was familiar with every conceivable combination of speed and attitude of which the aircraft was capable, one was not master of the aeroplane. Therefore a day would come when the aeroplane decided that it was in charge instead of the pilot, and that would be the last day. I never had cause to modify that view, and I kept my aerobatics well honed to the day of my last flight as a pilot.

=== Meteorological Flight ===
At the end of 1933 Quill was posted to the RAF Meteorological Flight at Duxford. There he joined a small team flying obsolescent Armstrong Whitworth Siskin IIIAs with open cockpits, no artificial horizon or radio, and only the most rudimentary blind-flying instruments (a Reid & Sigrist "turn-and-bank" indicator and an inclinometer). Wearing electrically heated suits which plugged into a socket in the cockpit, the unit made twice-daily scheduled flights (except on Sundays) up to 25,000 ft to collect data at 1,000-foot intervals on temperature, humidity and cloud formation for weather reports. On landing, the results had to be signalled or telephoned immediately to the Met Office at Adastral House in London. After Quill took command of the flight in November 1934 he and his team managed to fly every slot for a whole year, regardless of "unflyable" weather and without missing a flight. For this hazardous achievement Quill was awarded the Air Force Cross at the age of 23. On one occasion, when letting down through cloud, his Siskin hit the ground hard but in perfect landing attitude, bounced over a hedge and overturned, pushing Quill's head forward on to the cockpit coaming (its raised border). Had he not already received a broken nose from an accident when boxing for the RAF, he would have qualified for the "Siskin nose" – a characteristic of many pilots of the period.

=== Vickers and the Supermarine Spitfire ===
After an interview at Brooklands (Weybridge) on 18 November 1935, Quill was invited to join Vickers (Aviation) Ltd and accepted this subject to obtaining permission for early release from his RAF short service commission. On 6 January 1936, he joined Vickers at Brooklands, as assistant to its chief test pilot, Joseph "Mutt" Summers. His initial task was the testing of the Wellesley bomber, and it was while flying a production Wellesley that Quill had a narrow escape. The 74 ft 7 in-wingspan bomber refused to recover from a spin and at 3,000 ft Quill decided to bail out. As he descended, the spiralling bomber seemed intent on slicing the pilot with its wings, but he landed safely not far from the Kingston bypass.

There was some rivalry between Vickers Ltd and Hawker Aircraft, whose Hurricane had first flown four months earlier. Jeffrey Quill's long association with the Spitfire began when, aged 23, he made his first flight in the prototype fighter K5054 on 26 March 1936 – Mutt Summers having made the maiden flight three weeks earlier – and his priority was to get the Spitfire cleared for acceptance by the RAF. The Spitfire needed a great deal of work before it was deemed safe for young RAF pilots to fly, and it did not enter squadron service until July 1938. However, developed through many marks and variants, the Spitfire remained a first-line fighter throughout the war.

After transferring full-time to Vickers Supermarine in 1938, Quill took complete charge of Spitfire test flying, working closely with Joseph (Joe) Smith who had taken over as chief designer for Supermarine in 1937, following the death of R.J. Mitchell in the same year.

== Second World War ==
During the Second World War, Quill was in charge of development and production flying at Vickers Supermarine, a job that he took so seriously that he felt he must obtain first-hand combat experience. Following the fall of France in 1940, he was determined to rejoin a fighter squadron. Forestalling opposition from his employers at Vickers Supermarine, he successfully argued the need to gain front-line operational experience and was temporarily released on 5 August 1940 to join No. 65 Squadron at RAF Hornchurch, privately hoping that it would be a permanent appointment. On 16 August he shot down a Messerschmitt Bf 109 and two days later he shared a victory over a Heinkel He 111. His combat days were short-lived because he was recalled after nineteen days to test the Spitfire Mk III, but they made Quill all the more determined to make the Spitfire an even better fighting machine, and his experiences in the Battle of Britain led to two important changes in the Spitfire. At high speed, the stick force from the ailerons had been very heavy, and this was found to be caused by the ballooning of the fabric covering of the ailerons, and so causing a thicker trailing edge section. This was cured by fitting stiffer, metal-covered ailerons. Quill also initiated an improvement in the optical quality of the cockpit side panels. His concerns about rearward vision from the cockpit led to changes and improvements to the canopy and rear fuselage. Later in 1940 he became chief test pilot for Vickers Armstrong's (Supermarine) Works.

=== No. 12 Commando and 'Operation Airthief' ===
By 1942 the Luftwaffe's Focke-Wulf Fw 190 was gaining the edge over Allied fighters, and it was an urgent priority to capture an airworthy example. For a while Quill was on standby to be taken to France to hijack a Fw 190 back to England. His friend Captain Philip Pinckney, a Commando officer, had prepared a daring proposal for approval by Combined Operations Headquarters, with the code name 'Operation Airthief', proposing that the two of them penetrate an airfield in occupied France. Privately, Quill did not rate their chances of survival very highly. Fortunately, on 23 June 1942 – coinciding with the submission of the paper to Combined Operations – a disoriented German pilot, Oberleutnant Armin Faber, mistook the Bristol Channel for the English Channel and landed an Fw 190 A-3 at RAF Pembrey in south Wales. Not long afterwards, Quill flew the captured German aircraft at Farnborough.

=== Fleet Air Arm ===
In January 1943 Quill was appointed an Officer of the Order of the British Empire. From November 1943 to April 1944 he served with the Fleet Air Arm, as a lieutenant commander, helping to develop better carrier-deck-landings with the Supermarine Seafire, the naval version of the Spitfire. With the introduction of the Seafire, the Fleet Air Arm had suffered serious losses in deck-landing accidents. After a deck-landing course at Easthaven, Quill served on the training carrier HMS Ravager, and then the escort carrier HMS Attacker, which had two Seafire squadrons (No.s 879 and 886) on board. He flew with both squadrons and was later attached to 1837 (Fighter) squadron, which was shore-based. During his time with the Navy he made more than 75 deck landings. The distinguished naval test pilot Eric Brown later wrote: "Jeffrey was an inspired choice, as he had the analytical mind of a superb test pilot, trained to find answers to any flight problem." By the time Quill returned to Supermarine he knew the problems thoroughly, having deck-landed all the British and American carrier types, with the exception of the Fairey Firefly. By the end of the war he had personally test-flown all variants of the Spitfire and Seafire.

== Postwar ==
In the immediate postwar era, Quill continued as a test pilot, flying the latest Supermarine jets, including the Attacker and Swift. By 1947 he had made the first flights and masterminded the development and production test flying of all 52 variants of the Spitfire – the only allied fighter to remain in full production and front-line service throughout the Second World War. He also made the first flights of the Dumbo (an experimental variable-incidence wing torpedo bomber to S.24/37), the Spiteful, the Seafang and, on 27 July 1946, the Attacker, the Royal Navy's first jet fighter.

Later he became a military aircraft marketing executive for the British Aircraft Corporation – BAC.

After his retirement he became a prolific author, chronicling the Spitfire and its legacy through: Spitfire: A Test Pilot's Story (1983), and Birth of a Legend: The Spitfire (1986).

Having retired with his wife Claire to the Isle of Man, Jeffrey Quill became involved with an annual lecture given by the Association of Manx Pilots, later to become the Jeffrey Quill Memorial Lecture. He was elected President of the Spitfire Society.

=== Death ===
Jeffrey Quill died at his home in the village of Andreas, Isle of Man, on 20 February 1996. He is buried in St Andrew's church yard, the church being near to the former fighter station RAF Andreas which operated Spitfires from 1941 to 1942.

After Jeffrey Quill's death in 1996 the British aviation society, the Air League, created a new award in his name, and since 1997 they have awarded the Jeffrey Quill Medal annually "for an outstanding contribution to the development of air-mindedness in Britain's youth".

== Portrayal in film ==
The First of the Few (released in 1942 and known in the US as Spitfire) was a British feature film, in which David Niven played the part of "Geoffrey Crisp", a composite character based on Quill and the Schneider Trophy pilots of 1927, 1929 and 1931.

On 1–2 November 1941, Quill flew to RAF Northolt in a Spitfire Mk II, mocked up to resemble the prototype K5054. Flying for over an hour on 1 November and for 45 minutes on 2 November, he performed the aerobatic flying sequences that are shown in the final 15 minutes of the film.

== See also ==
- Alex Henshaw
