= Daniel Mylrea =

Archdeacon of Man from 1814 to 1832

Daniel Mylrea (1757–1832) was Archdeacon of Man from 1814 to 1832. He was Chaplain of Ramsey in 1783; Vicar of Michael in 1796; Rector of Ballaugh in 1802; and Rector of Andreas till his death in 1832. According to the inscription on his tombstone,

'He was a tender husband, an affectionate father, kind to the poor and given to hospitality.'
