= Hugh Gill =

Hugh Stowell Gill was an Anglican priest, the Archdeacon of Man from 1895 until his death on 13 May 1912.

Gill was born in Castletown, Isle of Man on 26 March 1830 into an ecclesiastical family. His father was the Reverend William Gill and his mother, Anne, was the daughter of the Reverend Hugh Stowell.

Gill was educated at King Williams College on the Isle of Man and Trinity College, Dublin. He was ordained in 1853 was a curate at St Luke's Baldwin before incumbencies at Rushen and Malew. He also became the Rural Dean of Castletown in 1879, a post he held until his appointment as an archdeacon.

Church of England titles
Preceded by Joshua Hughes-Games	Archdeacon of Man; 1895–1912	Succeeded by John Kewley
