= Christopher Marsden =

Anglican priest (died 1701)

Christopher Marsden was an Anglican priest: the Archdeacon of Man from 1700 until 1701.

Marsden was born in Prescot and educated at Brasenose College, Oxford. The Rector of Andreas, he died in a shipwreck on 3 October 1701.
