= William Mylrea =

William Mylrea was Archdeacon of Man from 18 July 1760 until his death on 14 September 1787.

He was Rector of Bride then Andreas.
