= John Kewley (priest) =

John Kewley was an Anglican priest on the Isle of Man; he was Archdeacon of Man from 1912 until 1938.

Born on 1 May 1860, he was educated at King William's College on the island and Sidney Sussex College, Cambridge. Ordained in 1883 he was a curate at St Paul, Ramsey, Isle of Man, then Vicar of Kirk Arbory. After this he was Rural Dean of Castletown from 1897 until his appointment as Archdeacon.

He died on 6 November 1941.

Church of England titles
Preceded by Hugh Stowell Gill	Archdeacon of Man; 1912–1938	Succeeded by Charles Vincent Stockwood
