= Cecil Hall =

(John) Cecil Hall (17 May 1804 – 8 February 1844) was Archdeacon of Man from 19 September 1839 until his death.

The son of Charles Henry Hall, Dean of Christ Church, he was educated at his father's college and held incumbencies at Great Cressingham and Kirk Andreas. In 1832 he married Frances Amelia, daughter of The Honourable John Wingfield-Stratford.
