= Knock y Doonee Ogham Stone =

5th-century memorial on the Isle of Man

- CIIC ID: CIIC 500
- CISP ID: ANDRS/1
- Country: Isle of Man
- Region: Andreas
- City/Village: Originally Knoc-y-doonee, currently Manx Museum, Douglas
- Produced: 5th Century
- Dimensions: 1.75m high, 43cm wide, 20cm thick

Ogham letters:
- ᚐᚋᚁᚔᚉᚐᚈᚑᚄ ᚋᚐᚊᚔ ᚏᚑᚉᚐᚈᚑᚄ

Text - Native:
- AMBICATOS MAQI ROCATOS

Text - English:
- Ambicatos, son of Rocatos

Text - Latin:
- AMMECATI FILIUS ROCATI HIC IACIT

Other resources:
- Ogham; Ogham inscription

The Knock y Doonee Ogham Stone is an early medieval memorial stone with inscriptions carved in Latin and Ogham.

== History ==
The stone was discovered in 1911 during the excavation of a chapel at Knock y Doonee in the parish of Andreas on the Isle of Man. A Viking boat burial was later discovered at this site in 1927, one of the two that have been excavated on the Isle of Man. The other is at Balladoole.

The stone was later moved to Castle Rushen, and by 1945 it had been moved to its current location at the Manx Museum in Douglas where it has the catalogue number "MM 5". The stone is made from 'clay slate', and is believed to have originated from hills six miles to the south of the site where it was found. It has the designation CIIC 500 in R. A. Stewart Macalister's Corpus Inscriptionum Insularum Celticarum (1945).

== Inscription ==
The Latin and Ogham inscriptions are dated to the 5th or early 6th century, and both commemorate a person named Ammecatus son of Rocatus. The Latin inscription reads Ammecati filius Rocati hic iacit ("Ammecatos son of Roactus lies here"), but the Ogham inscription is damaged and cannot be read with certainty. Macalister reads the Ogham inscription as Ebicatos maqi Rocatos (Ebicatos son of Rocatos), whereas K. H. Jackson reads the first name as either "Imbicatos" or "Ambicatos". The names Ammecatus (or Ambicatos) and Rocatus (or Rocatos) are both Celtic, but it is unclear whether they are Irish or Brittonic. The element catos in both names means "battle".
