= St Judes, Isle of Man =

Coordinates: 54.34064°N 4.46967°W

St Judes, Isle of Man: Manx: Balley Keeill Yude
- St Jude's Church

- Location within the Isle of Man
- Parish: Andreas
- Sheading: Ayre
- Crown dependency: Isle of Man
- Police: Isle of Man
- Fire: Isle of Man
- Ambulance: Isle of Man

St Judes (Manx: Balley Keeill Yude) is a small village in the parish of Andreas, Isle of Man. It is located at the crossroads of the A13 and A17 just north of Sulby.

== St Jude's Church ==
St Jude's Church was built in 1839 in the neo-Romanesque style with a square tower. The architect was John Welch (1810–1855). With an Act of Tynwald, the church was consecrated in 1841 by the Reverend William Drury.

In March 2002, St Jude's was scheduled to be demolished; it had been declared redundant as a place of worship, and the building's structural integrity was called into question. Protestors successfully demonstrated against its demolition. The organisation Friends of St Jude's Church received custodianship of the church in 2005. Repairs were subsequently carried out.

== Education ==
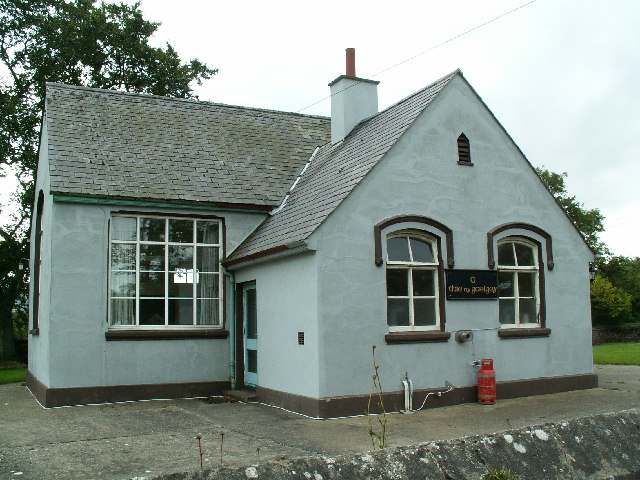
Thie ny Gaelgey

A local school first opened in 1841 across the road from St Jude's Church. As of the Education Act of 1872, the "parochial" school was run by the Church of England. Ownership of St Jude's School transferred to the newly established Board of Education in 1883 to be run as a state school.

Due to waning demand, St Jude's Primary School closed in 1982. It was acquired by Yn Çheshaght Ghailckagh in 1986 and reopened as a Manx-language and dance school Thie ny Gaelgey. Friends of St Jude's Church and the Cliogaree Twoaie choir have also utilised the space.
