= Knock y Doonee =

Historic monument site on the Isle of Man

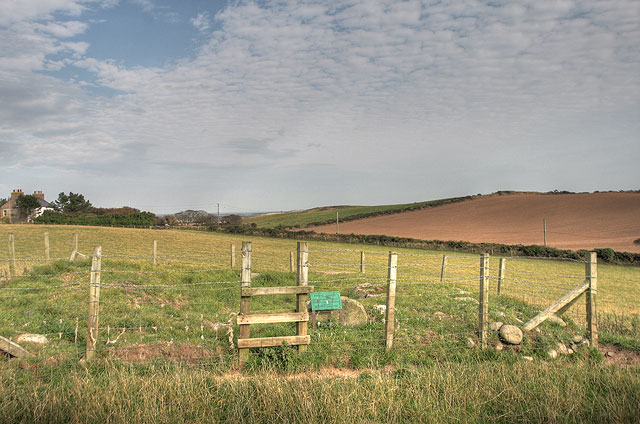
- Knock y Doonee keeill, with Viking Ship Burial site on the hilltop in the distance

- Map of the Isle of Man showing the location of Knock y Doonee
- Interactive map of Knock y Doonee
- 54.392916°N 4.458138°W
- Periods: Medieval, Viking
- Location: Knock y Doonee Andreas
- Region: Isle of Man

Site notes
- Public access: No

Knock y Doonee (also spelled as Knock-e-Dhooney) is a significant historical and archaeological site in the parish of Andreas on the northern coast of the Isle of Man. The site has been in ritual use for centuries. Archaeological excavations have uncovered a Christian keeill (a small chapel) with a bilingual ogham stone and a Christian carved stone cross; and on a nearby hilltop a Viking Age boat burial.

== Archaeological sites ==
Two distinct archaeological sites have been excavated at Knock y Doonee. The Keeill site was investigated in 1911 by the Manx Archaeological Survey, led by P. M. C. Kermode. In 1927 Kermode, now director of the Manx Museum, returned to Knock y Doonee to excavate the hill-top mound some 300m away within which a Viking Age boat burial and associated grave goods were discovered.

=== Knock y Doonee Keeill ===
The remains of an ancient keeill were discovered at this site. A keeill is a small simple chapel, most of which were built between the 6th and 12th centuries on the Isle of Man. Most of the keeills on the Isle of Man have now been destroyed or lost—there may have been over three hundred but now less than three dozen have upstanding remains, Knock y Doonee is one of the best-preserved of these. The keeill is thought to have a very early origin, dating possibly to 400–600 AD., but it is unknown how many times or when it may have been rebuilt or improved.

The site was investigated by the Manx Archaeological Survey under P. M. C. Kermode in 1911. The walls were constructed from beach boulders and surface stones, and with an average thickness of 1.1 m. Like many keeills, the structure was small, measuring 9.7 m × 8.2 m internally. The entrance door was located at the west end. Carved socket stones may have been used for a door.

The remains of the altar were found in-situ against the east wall on a cobbled floor. The altar was made up of a large slab measuring 0.7 m × 0.4 m × 0.05 m which balanced on two side slabs. The altar was relatively low, standing at only 0.6 m in height. Kermode suggested that a portable altar may have been placed on top of the slab. Over 100 white quartz pebbles were discovered around the altar, which were possibly votive or prayer offerings.

=== Ogham Stone ===
Just West of the Keeill a Manx-mudstone ('Manx slate') pillar stood in the ground, with no visible markings but obviously erected by hand of man. When raised, it was found to be a bilingual early memorial stone, the wrong way up. The face inscription in Latin reads Ammecati filius Rocati hic iacit ("Ammecatos son of Rocatus lies here"). However, the Ogham down the edge inscription cannot be read with certainty as it has been badly damaged. It is currently housed in the Manx Museum.

=== Stone cross slab ===
During the 1911 excavation, a broken boulder with a carved cross on it was discovered. It is a plain cross with open ends that are connected by a ring. It is currently housed in Kirk Andreas Parish Church.

=== Knock y Doonee Viking ship burial ===
In autumn 1927 P. M. C. Kermode excavated a large grass covered burial mound on a hilltop some 300 m SE of the Keeill. A Viking ship burial dating to 900–950 AD was discovered. Although almost all of the timber from the original vessel has long rotten away, some 300 iron rivets were still in place, and their position showed that the boat was between 8.5-9 m long and 1.8-2.4 m wide.

A Viking, presumed to be a man, was buried there. He was wrapped in a cloak and was accompanied by many grave goods. He was buried with several domestic items such as fishing gear, a cloak-pin, and a bowl. The smith's hammer, tongs and nails that were buried with him may indicate that he was a blacksmith. Additionally, a sword, shield, axe and a spear were uncovered. The remains of a horse and a dog also were found to accompany the burial. The man was most likely a prominent member of his community due to the quality of his grave goods and the elaborate burial that was given to him.

Although the burial was certainly pagan, it was within close sight of the nearby keeill. There were also no human sacrifices, which was present at the older Balladoole Viking boat burial. These factors may be a sign that there was a gradual move away from traditional Viking beliefs and practices during this period.
