= Brian Smith (priest) =

Anglican priest

Brian Smith (born 15 July 1944) is a retired Anglican priest. He was the Archdeacon of Man in the Church of England from 2005 to 2011.

Smith was educated at Barton Peveril Grammar School and ordained in 1975 after an earlier career in commerce and industry. He was a curate at St Thomas' Pennywell after which he was an RAF chaplain from 1977 to 1995. He was Vicar of St John's Keswick from 1995 until his appointment as archdeacon of Man in 2005. He retired in 2011.

Church of England titles
Preceded by Brian Partington	Archdeacon of Man; 2005–2011	Succeeded by Andie Brown
