= Charles Henry Hall (priest) =

English churchman and academic

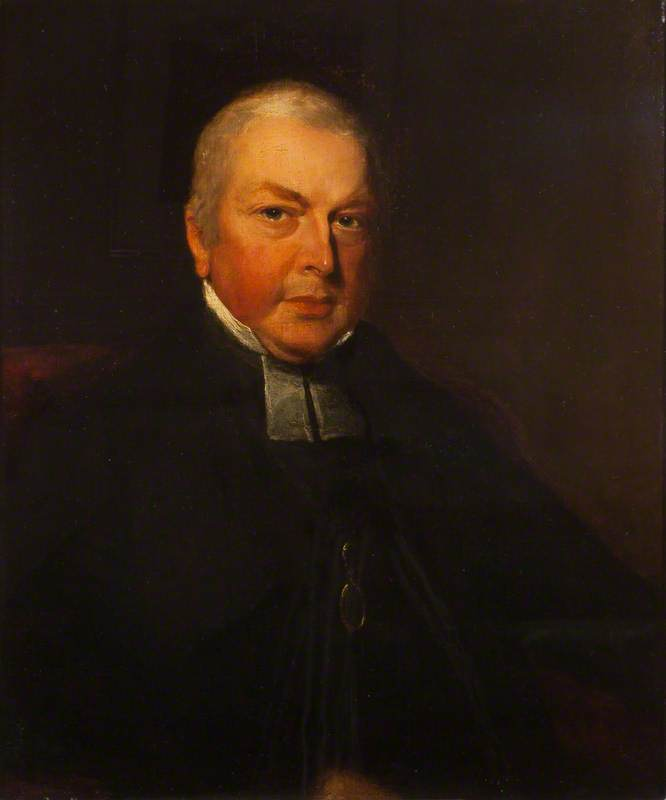
Charles Henry Hall

Charles Henry Hall (1763–1827) was an English churchman and academic, Dean of Christ Church, Oxford and then Dean of Durham.

== Life ==
He was the son of Charles Hall (1718–1774), dean of Bocking, Essex, and Elizabeth Carsan (b. 1738), and uncle of watercolour artist John Frederick Tayler. He was admitted to Westminster School in 1775, was elected to Christ Church, Oxford, and matriculated on 3 June 1779. In 1781 he won the chancellor's prize for Latin verse on Strages Indica Occidentalis, and in 1784 the English essay on The Use of Medals. He graduated B.A. in 1783, M.A. in 1786, B.D. in 1794, and D.D. in 1800. From 1792 to 1797 he was tutor and censor of Christ Church. In 1793 he served in the office of junior proctor.

Hall was presented by his college to the vicarage of Broughton-in-Airedale, Yorkshire, in 1794. In 1798 he was appointed Bampton lecturer and prebendary of Exeter. He became rector of Kirk Bramwith, Yorkshire, in June 1799, and prebendary of the second stall in Christ Church Cathedral on 30 November of that year. In 1805 he was made sub-dean of Christ Church and in 1807 vicar of Luton, Bedfordshire, a preferment which he held until his death.

In February 1807 Hall was elected Regius Professor of Divinity and moved to the fifth stall in Christ Church. He resigned from both offices in October 1809, on being nominated Dean of Christ Church. He was prolocutor of the lower house of Convocation in 1812. On 26 February 1824, he was installed Dean of Durham. He died in Edinburgh on 16 February 1827. He published his Bampton Lectures on Fulness of Time in 1799, and some single sermons.

== Family ==
Hall married in 1794 Anna Maria Bridget Byng (1771–1852), daughter of the Hon. John Byng (later fifth Viscount Torrington). Their son Percy Francis Hall (1801–1884) attended one of the Powerscourt Conferences. He was a pacifist who joined the Plymouth Brethren, and published in 1833 a pamphlet justifying his resignation as a naval officer. He had initially been under the influence of Edward Irving. Another son, Herbert Byng Hall (1805–1883), served in the British Army reaching the rank of captain. He wrote several books on travel, sport and food, as well as two novels. He later worked as a Queen's Messenger. Arthur Hall (1809–1879), joined the army and became a major-general in India. John Cecil Hall (1804–1844), became Archdeacon of Man. His daughter Cecilia Charlotte Hall (1800–1892) married Admiral Charles Mainwaring.
