= Edward Brown Glass =

Anglican Archdeacon

Edward Brown Glass was an Anglican priest: the Archdeacon of Man from 1964 until 1978.

Born on 1 July 1913, he was educated at King Williams College on the island and Durham University and ordained in 1938. After curacies in Rochdale and Gorton he held incumbencies at Heywood, Ramsey and Castletown before his Archdeacon’s appointment.

He died on 2 June 1995.

Church of England titles
Preceded by Ernest Henry Stenning	Archdeacon of Man; 1964–1978	Succeeded by Arthur Ashford Clague
