= Andrew Browne =

Andrew Browne may refer to:

- Andrew Browne (footballer, born 1984), Australian rules footballer for Fremantle and Claremont
- Andrew Browne (footballer, born 1990), Australian rules footballer for Richmond
- Andrew Browne (artist) (born 1960), Australian artist
- Andrew Browne (mayor), in 1574 Mayor of Galway
- Andrew Browne (rugby union) (born 1987), Irish rugby union player

== See also ==
- Andrew Brown (disambiguation)
