= Arthur Clague =

Arthur Ashford Clague (12 January 1915 – 13 August 1983) was an Anglican priest, and the Archdeacon of Man from 1978 until 1982.

Clague was educated at King Williams College on the Isle of Man and at Durham University, and ordained in 1939. He was Curate at St Mary, Crumpsall, then a Lecturer at Bolton Parish Church. He was Rector of Christ Church, Harpurhey from 1945 to 1949 followed by twenty years as the incumbent of Golborne. He was the Vicar of Lezayre from 1969 to 1982; for the last four of these, he was an archdeacon.

== Notes ==
Church of England titles
Preceded by Edward Brown Glass	Archdeacon of Man; 1978–1982	Succeeded by David Albert Willoughby
