= Ernest Stenning =

Ernest Henry Stenning MBE TD (27 January 1885 – 2 February 1964) was an Anglican priest. He was the Archdeacon of Man in the Church of England from 1958 until his death in 1964.

Born in Shermanbury, Sussex, Stenning was educated at Downing College, Cambridge, and ordained in 1911. By profession a science teacher, he taught from 1911 at King Williams College, where he was also school chaplain and Vice-Principal. An Honorary Chaplain to the Queen, he was president of the Manx Antiquarian Society, a co-founder of the Manx Grand Prix and a Provincial Grand Master of the Isle of Man Freemasons (1957–1964).

Church of England titles
| Preceded by Vincent Stockwood | Archdeacon of Man; 1958–1964 | Succeeded by Edward Glass |
