= Vincent Stockwood =

Charles Vincent Stockwood (29 June 1885 – 28 March 1958) was an Anglican priest, the Archdeacon of Man from 1938 to 1958.

Born on 29 June 1885 he was educated at Cowbridge Grammar School and St Catherine's College, Oxford. Ordained in 1910 his first post was as a curate at All Saints, Camberwell after which he was Associate Secretary of the Church Pastoral Society from 1914 to 1918. He was then Vicar of St Olave's Ramsey from 1918 to 1927 when he became Rural Dean of Douglas, a post he held until his archdeacon’s appointment.

He died in the post on 28 March 1958.

Church of England titles
Preceded by John Kewley	Archdeacon of Man; 1938–1958	Succeeded by Ernest Stenning
