= John Frederick Tayler =

English painter

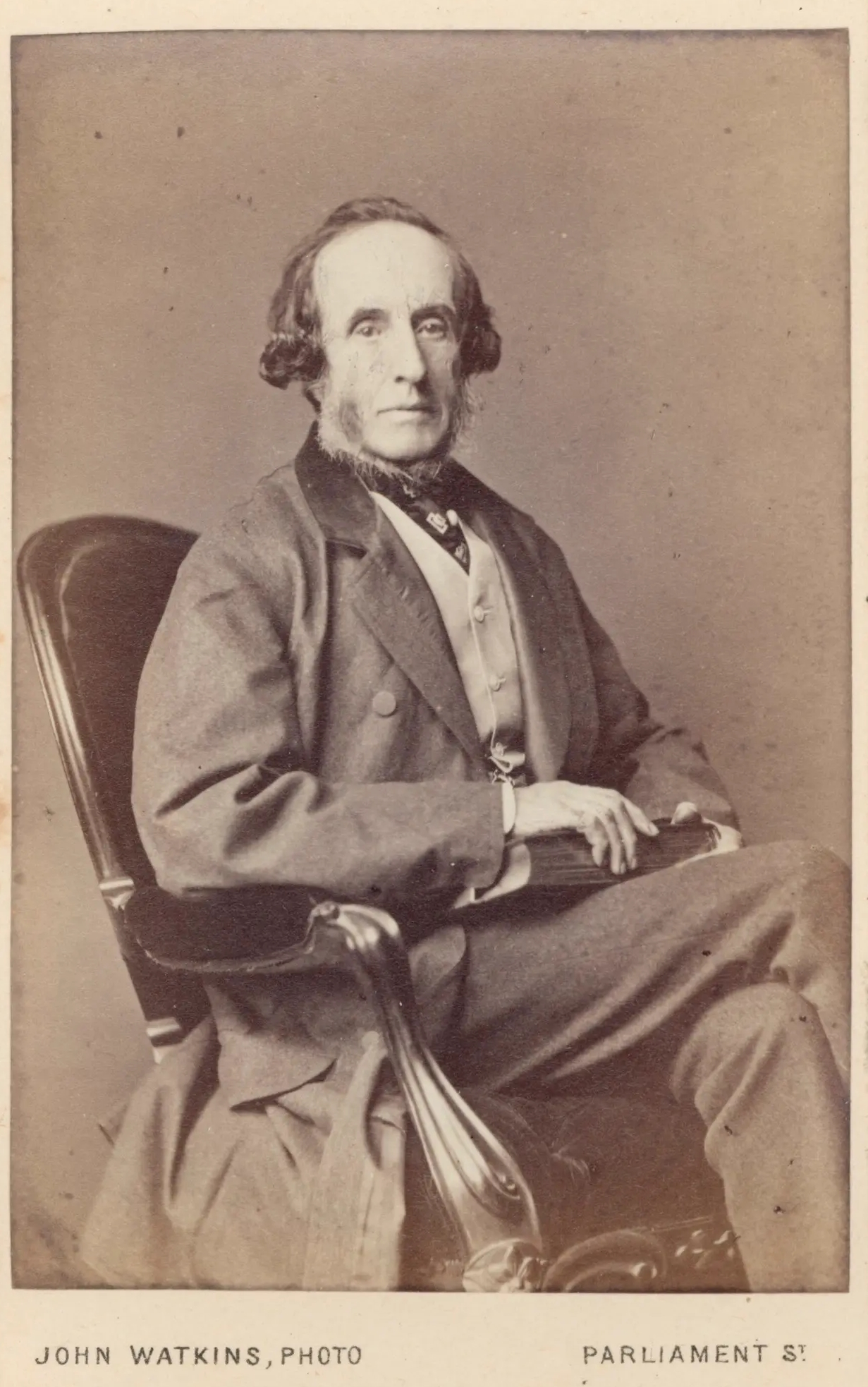

(John) Frederick Tayler (30 April 1802 – 20 June 1889) was a 19th-century English engraver and watercolour landscape artist. He was a president of the Royal Watercolour Society.

== Personal ==
Frederick was the son of a country gentleman, Archdale Wilson Tayler and his wife Frances Eliza, and was born at Boreham Wood, Elstree, Hertfordshire, on 30 April 1802. His siblings included Henry Joseph (b.1787), Elisa (b.1789), Sarah Maria (b.1790), Susannah Matilda (b.1791), Julia (b.1793), George Robert (b. 1795), Charles (b.1796), Anna Frances (b.1797), Emily Susan (b.1799), Thomas Edward (b.1799), Joseph Francis (b. 1805), Joseph Edward (b. 1807), William (b. 1808).

The elder Tayler was ruined by the dishonesty of an agent, and entered the army. He died while Frederick was still a child, leaving a widow and seventeen children, several of whom rose to a certain eminence in their careers. William Tayler, commissioner of Patna in India, was a younger brother. The family had influential friends and some clerical interest.

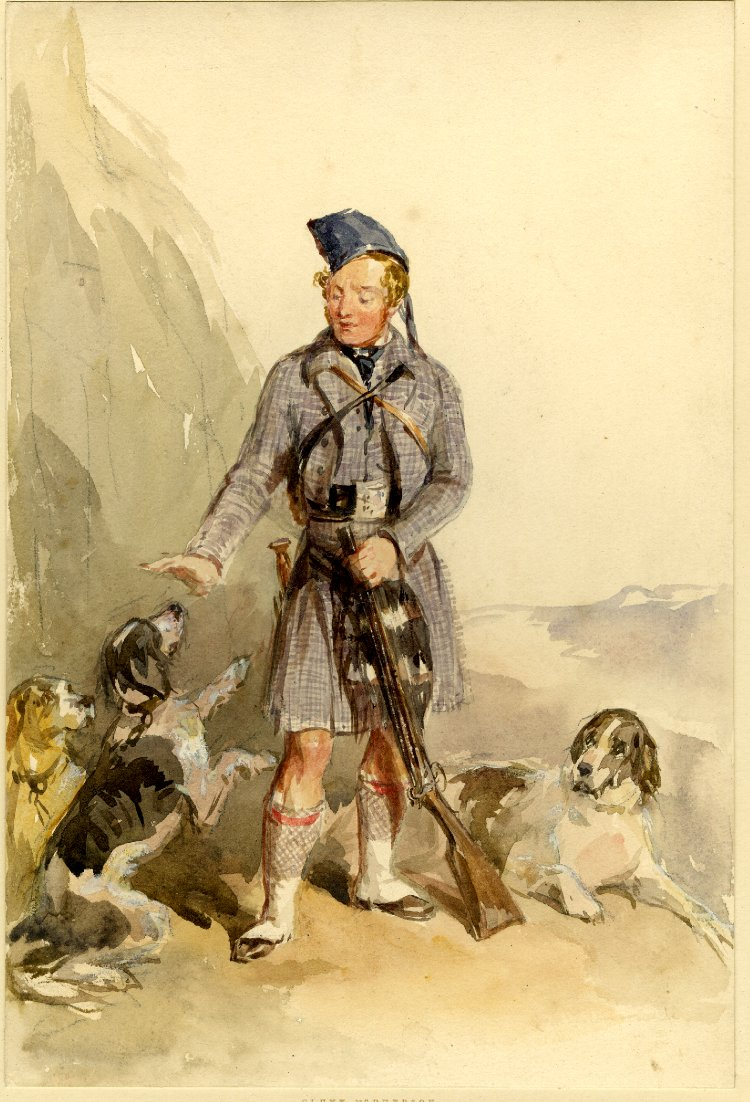
"Cluny MacPherson, chief of the Clan Chattan," watercolour, touched with bodycolour (over graphite), by the British painter and printmaker John Frederick Tayler (1801–1889). 267 mm x 182 mm. Courtesy of the British Museum, London.

== Education ==
Frederick's uncle, Charles Henry Hall, was dean of Christ Church, Oxford, and the boy was educated successively at Eton College and Harrow School, and destined for the church. He soon, however, showed his strong artistic bent, and, in spite of domestic opposition, determined to become a painter.

After studying at Sass's school and at the Royal Academy he went to Paris, and worked for a time under Horace Vernet, also frequenting the studio of Vernet's son-in-law, Paul Delaroche. From France he passed into Italy, where he spent some time, chiefly in Rome. While still a lad he met Richard Parkes Bonington at Calais, and a friendship sprang up between the two painters, who for a time shared a studio in Paris.

== Watercolours ==
Tayler's fondness for watercolour was no doubt encouraged by Bonington, and though he made his début in the academy of 1830 with an oil-picture, ‘The Band of the 2nd Life Guards,’ he did not long hesitate in his choice of a medium. In mature life he occasionally turned his ambition towards oil, and even took some friendly lessons in Mr. W. P. Frith's studio (Frith, Autobiography). It was, however, as a painter of ‘elegant’ sporting and pastoral scenes in watercolour that he achieved the popularity which was maintained throughout his long career. His sporting subjects were of two classes, some dealing with the costumes and accessories of eighteenth-century stag-hunts, others with incidents of contemporary sport in the highlands of Scotland. Akin to these were his illustrative drawings of costume and scenery, many of them suggested by incidents in the ‘Waverley Novels.’

=== Old Watercolour Society ===
In February 1831 Tayler was elected an associate of the Royal Watercolour Society (the so-called "Old Watercolour Society"), and in June 1834 he became a full member. He contributed in all about five hundred drawings to the society's exhibitions, about half of which appeared during Copley Fielding's presidency (1831–1855). A dozen of these were painted in collaboration with the younger George Barret (d. 1842), and one, ‘The Favourites,’ with Thomas Miles Richardson On the death of Fielding in 1855 Tayler, as senior member of the committee of management, was vice-president for the year, and discharged the duties of president during the interregnum of eight months which, out of respect for Fielding's memory, was allowed to pass before the election of his successor. In his official capacity Tayler became a member of the fine arts committee for the Paris Exhibition of 1855, as well as one of the jury. On his arrival in Paris, however, the hanging of the pictures was practically completed. He was nevertheless fiercely attacked in connection with some alleged unfairness, notably as regards the works of John Frederick Lewis. His distress at this affair brought on a serious illness, from the effects of which he did not finally recover until peace was restored in the society by the election of Lewis as president.

In February 1858 Lewis resigned office, and Tayler was unanimously elected president. He filled this position for over twelve years, and retired in June 1871. He continued to send drawings to the society's exhibitions down to the time of his death. This took place at West Hampstead on 20 June 1889. He was buried in Hampstead cemetery. His drawings and sketches were sold at Christie's on 15 February 1890. Tayler married, in 1837, Jane Parratt, and left several children, one of whom, Norman Tayler, followed his father's profession, and became an associate of the Watercolour Society in 1878.

== Works ==
Many of Tayler's best known drawings, such as ‘Weighing the Deer’ and ‘Crossing the Brook,’ were engraved. He himself executed some two dozen ‘lithotints,’ which were published by T. McLean in 1844, under the title of ‘Frederick Tayler's Portfolio.’ A member of the ‘Etching Club,’ he etched a number of small plates for the various publications of that body (Goldsmith's 'The Deserted Village,’ ‘Songs of Shakespeare,’ ‘Etched Thoughts,’ &c.), and also made drawings on wood for several popular classics, such as Thomson's ‘Seasons,’ ‘Sir Roger de Coverley,’ and Goldsmith's ‘Works.’ His art, though now somewhat old-fashioned, had a great vogue in his day, some of his drawings fetching over £350. at public auction in the 1900s. His powers were best displayed in rapid and suggestive sketches, in which, says Mr. Ruskin, ‘the quantity of effect obtained is enormous in proportion to the apparent means’.

== Style ==
English artist and critic, Philip Gilbert Hamerton, described his style as having:

".. two distinct manners as an etcher: the highly-finished modern way, depending greatly on crevés,* of various depth, and on dry-point whose bur is removed; and another manner, resembling the work of a draughtsman on wood, in which the peculiar powers of etching are abandoned."

== Bibliography ==
- Walter Armstrong, "Tayler, Frederick", Dictionary of National Biography, 1885–1900, Volume 55
- Frederick Tayler, Studies in animal painting: with eighteen coloured plates, from water-colour drawings, Publisher: Cassell, 1884, 24 pages.

=== Books illustrated ===
- William John Thoms, Gammer Gurton's famous histories of sir Guy of Warwick, sir Bevis of Hampton [&c.] revised and amended by Amb[rose] Mer[ton], Published 1846
- John Milton, L'Allegro, Publisher: the Etching club, 1849.
