= Joshua Hughes-Games =

Archdeacon of Man from 1886 to 1894

Joshua Hughes-Games born Joshua Jones (1831–1904) was an Anglican priest, the Archdeacon of Man from 1886 until 1894.

Born in 1831, he changed his surname to Hughes-Games to receive an inheritance, and matriculated at Lincoln College, Oxford in 1848. He graduated first class in Mathematics in 1852.

Hughes-Games was ordained a deacon in 1854, and a priest in 1855 (by John Graham, Bishop of Chester). Following periods as curate at Doddleston in Cheshire and Holy Trinity, Manchester, Hughes-Games was vice-principal of York Training College from 1859 to 1861 then headmaster of the Liverpool Institute until 1865. He was principal of King William's College in the Isle of Man for the twenty years (1866–1886); and archdeacon of the island from then until 1894 when he became vicar of Holy Trinity, Hull.

Hughes-Games married Mary Helena Yates on 24 December 1859; they had ten children, several of his sons attending King William's College. His eldest son, Joshua Hughes Wynn Hughes-Games (1860-1904) followed his father as a clergyman, serving as vicar at St Matthew's, Birmingham; Birling, Kent; and Birkenhead, as did his second son, Stephen Herbert Wynn Hughes-Games (1862-1923), chaplain to the Bishop of Sodor and Man, diocesan inspector of schools, and principal of Bishop Wilson Theological College, Isle of Man, as well as curate in several places. A younger son, Cyril Tomlinson Wynn Hughes-Games (1868-1933), was a barrister, Vicar-General of the diocese of Sodor and Man, and a member of the legislative council of the Isle of Man. His youngest son, Harold James Wynn Hughes-Games (1872-1954), taught at King William's College, and later at the Royal Naval College, Osborne, Isle of Wight, and that at Dartmouth.

He died on 25 March 1904.
