= David Willoughby =

Anglican priest (1931–1998)

David Albert Willoughby (8 February 1931 – 17 June 1998) was an Anglican priest. He was the Archdeacon of Man in the Church of England from 1982 to 1996.

Willoughby was educated at Bradford Grammar School and Durham University (St John's College), where he completed a Diploma in Theology in 1957. He was ordained in 1958 and was a curate in Shipley and then Barnoldswick. He held incumbencies at Bracewell and then New Moston. Moving to the Isle of Man he was successively Vicar of Marown, Rural Dean of Douglas and Archdeacon of Man.

Church of England titles
Preceded by Arthur Clague	Archdeacon of Man; 1982–1996	Succeeded by Brian Partington
