= Brian Partington =

Brian Harold Partington OBE (born 31 December 1936) is a retired Anglican priest. He was the Archdeacon of Man in the Church of England from 1996 to 2005.

Partington was educated at Burnage Grammar School. After national service he worked in local government until 1963. He began his ordained ministry with curacies in Didsbury and Deane. Moving to the Isle of Man he was Vicar of Kirk Patrick from 1968 until his appointment as an archdeacon in 1996. He retired in 2005.

Church of England titles
Preceded by David Willoughby	Archdeacon of Man; 1996–2005	Succeeded by Brian Smith
