= Andrew Browne (artist) =

Australian contemporary artist

- Born: Andrew Browne; 1960 (age 65–66); Melbourne, Australia
- Known for: Painting,
- Movement: contemporary

Andrew Browne (born 1960) is an Australian contemporary artist. Browne was born in Melbourne. His paintings are realist in style and are influenced by photography. The sense of mystery and drama that his works evoke is balanced by the formal elegance of his compositions.

Browne's work has appeared in numerous public gallery exhibitions including "The Situation Now: A Survey of Local Non-Objective Art", University Art Museum, La Trobe University 1995, "The MCA Collection: The Victor & Loti Smorgon Gift of Contemporary Australian Art", Museum of Contemporary Art, Sydney1995, "The Moet et Chandon Touring Exhibition 1995/6, Black Attack", The National Gallery of Victoria 1996, "Depth of Field" 2003 at Monash University Museum of Art.

In 1999 Bendigo Art Gallery staged a survey exhibition of the artist's work titled, 'Painting Light.’

Browne's paintings have a stylized realism and an emotional coolness. His images can often seem to be cropped segments of a larger image. His subject matter ranges from landscapes and cityscapes to nocturnal images of lights and trees.

In the catalogue to the exhibition "Depth of Field" the curator Louise Tegart wrote, "Mysterious and highly sophisticated, the stylised paintings of Andrew Browne are based on his continuing observation of the world through photography. While his recent works are more descriptive than in the past, they continue his fascination with selective vision and the nature of seeing. Using photographs as notations, Browne captures the banal and ordinary and makes strange the familiar."
