= Andrew Brown (CNN journalist) =

British journalist

Andrew Brown is a British journalist who spent most of his career in Hong Kong. He produced technology-related features for CNN, which he joined in 2000. He reported on humorous stories, like on machines which allegedly track women's hormonal cycles, translate animal sounds or control dreams. He has also reported on more serious topics like computer passwords and Sars. Previously, he reported on-air for CNBC Asia and TVB Pearl, both while based in Hong Kong.

In February 2010, he won almost £4.5 million in damages after having been paralysed at a UK hospital. A fundraising dinner was held for him in Hong Kong, where he worked for 15 years, in 2009.
