= St Andrew's Church, Andreas, Isle of Man =

Church in Andreas, Isle of Man

St Andrew's Church
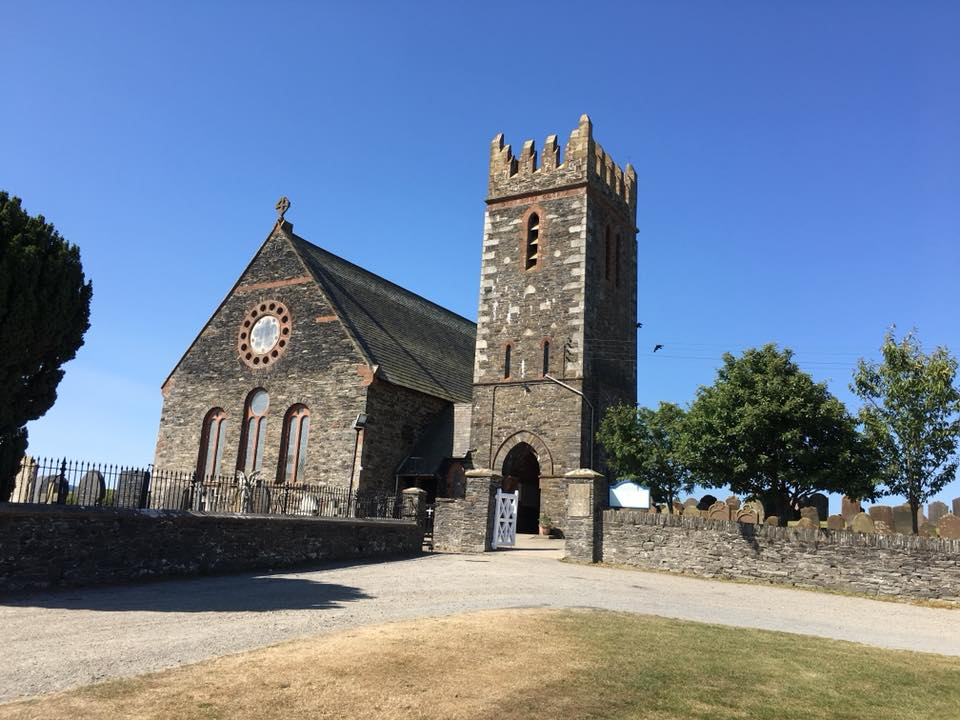
- Saint Andrew's Church, Kirk Andreas, Isle of Man

- 54.367°N 4.444°W
- Location: Andreas, Isle of Man.
- Country: Isle of Man
- Denomination: Church of England
- Tradition: Conservative evangelical
- Website: www.facebook.com/kirkandreaschurch/

History
- Status: Parish church
- Founded: 1821
- Dedication: Saint Andrew
- Consecrated: 1 November 1821

Architecture
- Functional status: Active
- Style: Gothic Revival
- Groundbreaking: 12th century (original church)
- Completed: 1821

Administration
- Diocese: Diocese of Sodor and Man
- Parish: Andreas

St Andrew's Church, Andreas, is a Church of England parish church in Andreas, Isle of Man. The church is administered by the Diocese of Sodor and Man.

== History ==
It is generally supposed that Christianity was introduced to the Isle of Man by St Patrick about the middle part of the 5th century and that St German was appointed as the first Bishop of Man.

Under the influence of St Patrick and what is referred to as his "Romish missionaries," the Isle of Man saw the erection of a series of small chapels throughout the Island. One such was Cabbal Vaartyn (which translates as Martin's Chapel) and which stood on what today is the road between Andreas and The Lhen. The chapel was dedicated to St Martin, Bishop of Tours, an uncle of St Patrick who is said to have been a man of eminent piety.

Sometime between the years 1270 and 1344, when the Isle of Man was under the dominion of the Scots, parishes were created which in turn saw the erection of a church within Andreas and dedicated to St Andrew, the patron saint of Scotland and from whom the name Andreas translates.

By 1800 the old church was in a poor state of repair, and on 19 February 1800 a special vestry meeting was held, attended by John Murray, 4th Duke of Atholl, at which it was decided to build a new parish church; however, building work did not start for several years after the 1800 Act of Tynwald.

Much of the cost was covered by donations and contributions, with the short-fall being met by holders of Quarterlands, cottages and Intacks in the parish with the amounts paid being levied by church wardens and sidemen. The chancel was paid for by the rector, which was customary at that time.

The church was constructed by Mr Radcliffe of Andreas, the father of Reverend W.T. Radcliffe. As there is no quarry in the parish, stone was sourced from Sulby Glen and many of the slates from the old church were reused on the new construction in order to keep costs down.

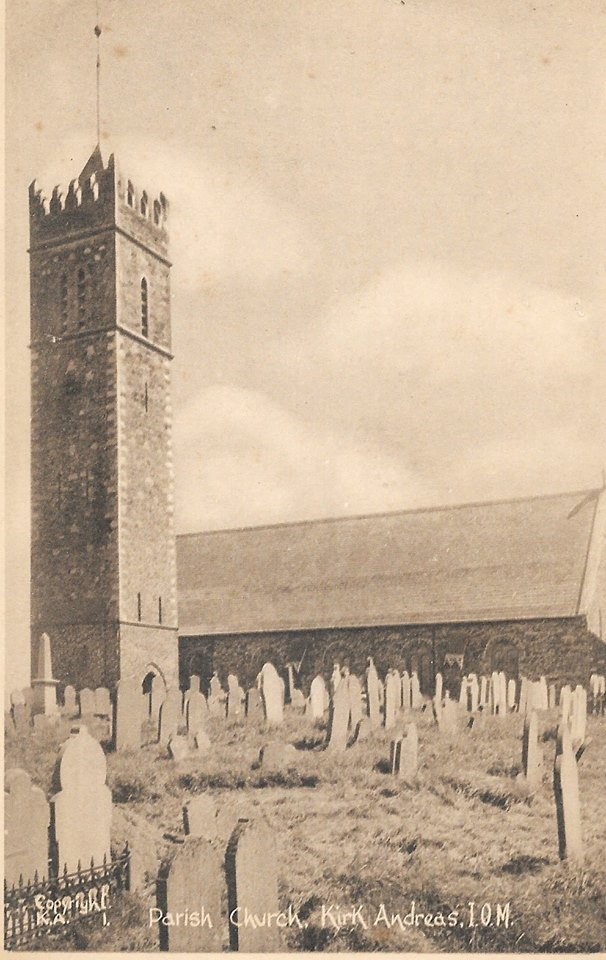
The bell tower of St Andrew's Church as originally constructed.

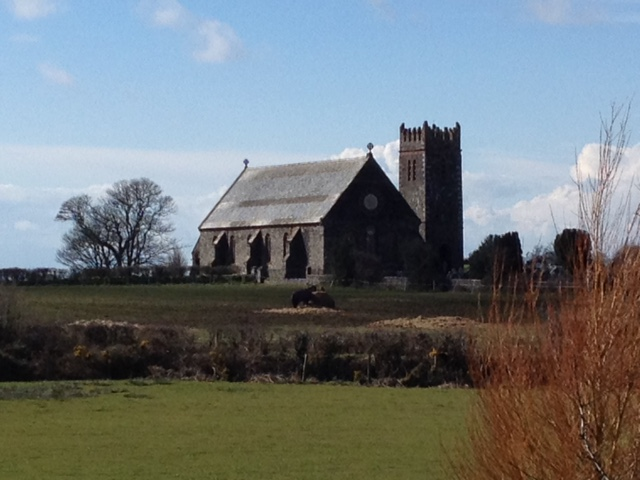
Kirk Andreas Church (reduced tower)

During the war years an electric blower for the church organ was donated by serving personnel at RAF Andreas.

=== Tower ===
When the church was rebuilt, the spire was situated at the western end; however, various improvements were made over the years. The roof was raised and between 1867 and 1869 the tower at the western end was demolished and a new one built alongside the church. The foundation stone was laid by Mrs Francis Hall (widow of Archdeacon Hall) on 30 May 1867.

The tower was originally 120 ft (36.6 m) in height. Connected to the main building by an arch it was a striking feature and visible all across the northern plain of the Isle of Man.

The west end of the church was extended to include new entrances on the north and south sides, with a central stairway to the gallery. The work was completed in August 1869 following which Archdeacon Moore gave a supper for all the workmen. A large bell was housed in the tower and granite circles and shapes were made from a split farm roller which was given to the builders for the purpose.

With the opening of RAF Andreas in 1941, the Air Ministry was given permission to cut down the flagpole on top of the tower and to replace it with an obstruction light. The tower was later reduced by removing the middle section on the orders of the Air Ministry. The numbered stones were stored and were originally intended to be restored at the end of the war. However, the restoration never took place, and the stones mysteriously disappeared.

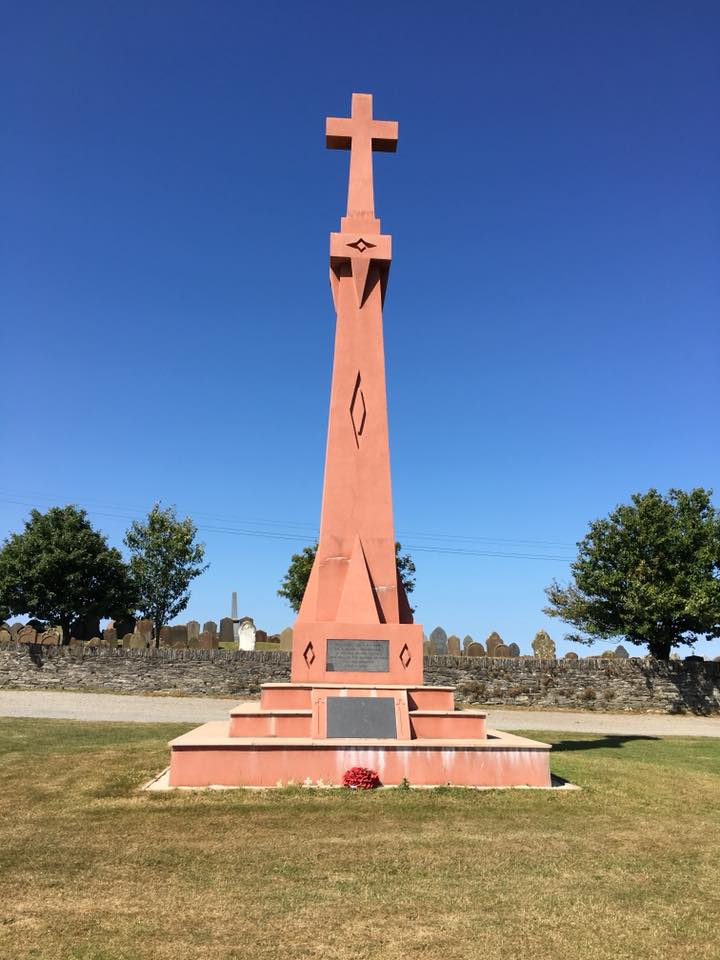
War memorial, St Andrew's Church, Andreas

=== War memorial ===
Another prominent feature of the church is the Andreas War Memorial commemorating those lost from the parish during both World Wars.

Designed by Cosmo Kendall, an inhabitant of the parish, the war memorial was erected by 85 parishioners who gave their time voluntarily. The entire cost of materials came from voluntary subscriptions from within the parish.

Constructed from 132 tons of red sandstone, the obelisk stands at 41 ft (12.5 m). It is mounted with five slate plaques with a cross at the top of the structure.

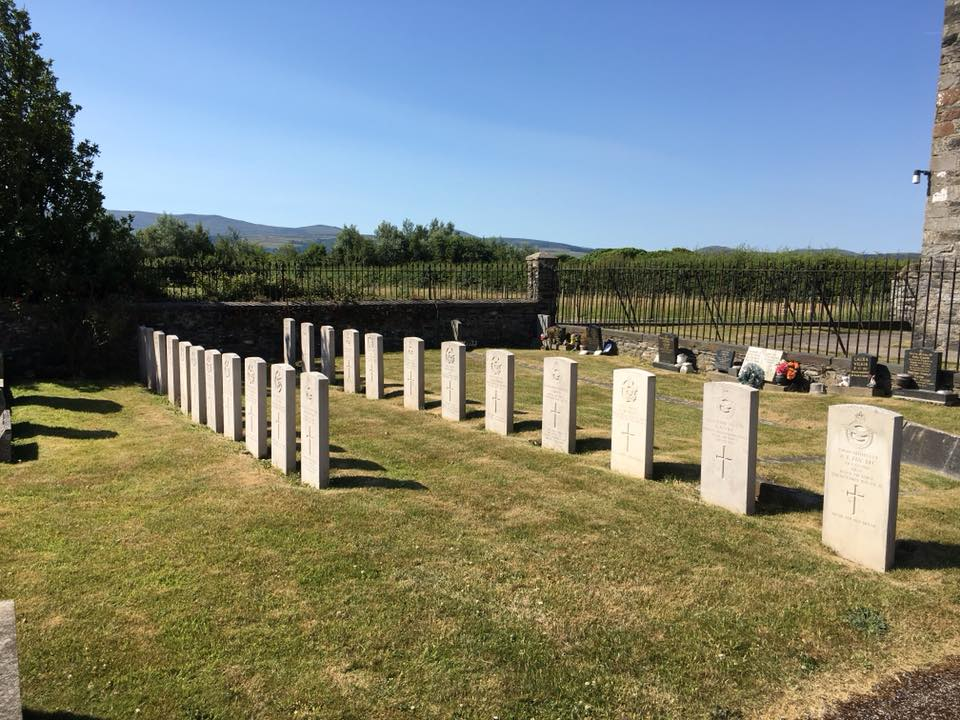
Military graves at St Andrews Church, Andreas

The memorial was unveiled on Sunday 9 November 1924, the ceremony being performed by Mrs J. Christian and Mrs T. Crowe, each of whom had lost two sons in the Great War. The memorial was dedicated by Archdeacon J. Kewley.

=== Military graves ===
Within a specified area of the churchyard are 23 military graves, the responsibility of the Commonwealth War Graves Commission. These include pilots of No. 457 Squadron RAAF, No. 452 Squadron RAAF, the Fleet Air Arm and trainees of No. 11 Air Gunnery School. In addition there are the graves of the commanding officer of RAF Andreas, Wing Commander Teddy Knowles DFC, and Major Geoffrey Waite MC of the Wiltshire Regiment who was in charge of airfield defence and who was killed alongside Wing Commander Knowles following the crash of Armstrong-Whitworth Whitley BD417 on 23 August 1942.

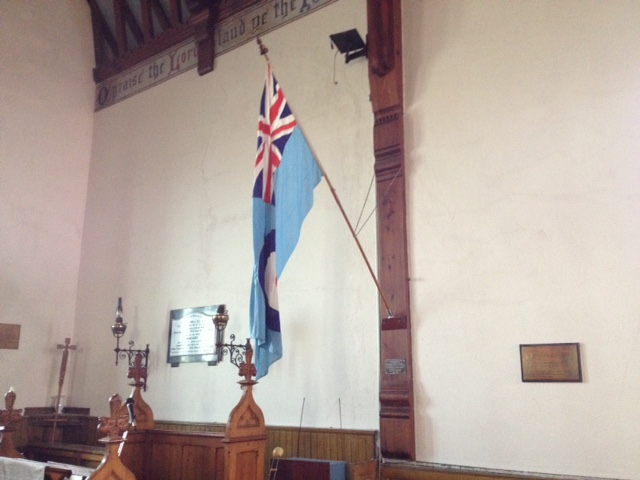
RAF Ensign in St Andrew's Church, Andreas

== Today ==
Today the parish church in Kirk Andreas, as Andreas is also known, continues to play an active role in the local community. The links between the parish and the Royal Air Force are not forgotten, and the RAF Ensign still flies proudly in the church.

== Notable gravesites ==
- Jeffrey Quill OBE, AFC, FRAeS: Distinguished aviator. Former Vickers Supermarine Chief Test Pilot, particularly renowned for his development of the Supermarine Spitfire.

== Gallery ==
St Andrew's Church, Andreas
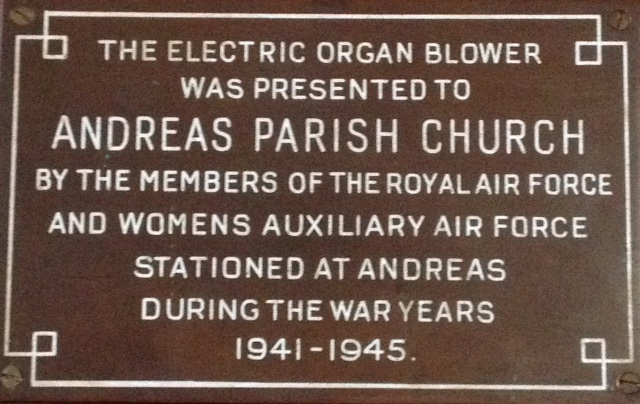
Plaque commemorating the donation of the organ to St Andrew's Church by personnel from RAF Andreas

== See also ==
- RAF Andreas
- Andreas (village)
- Andreas (parish)
