= Archdeacon of Man =

Church of England ecclesiastical office

The Archdeacon of Man (sometimes incorrectly referred to as Archdeacon of the Isle of Man) is a senior cleric second only to the Bishop of Sodor and Man in the Anglican Diocese of Sodor and Man (which comprises the Isle of Man). This is unusual, as in the Church of England deans are usually the senior priests of the diocese. In Sodor and Man, however, the role of dean was fulfilled by the Bishop for many years, until becoming distinct again only in October 2011. According to advice given by Queen Elizabeth II, Lord of Mann, the Archdeacon "is the bishop's second in command", and this seniority is reflected, e.g., on Tynwald Day in the Order of the Procession, and by the fact that until 1919 the Archdeacon of Man was an ex officio member of the Legislative Council.

== List of archdeacons ==
Abbreviations used in the list:

- aft. = after
- bef. = before
- d. = died in office
- res. = resigned
- ret. = retired

=== Medieval ===
- bef. 1248 – 1249 (res.): Laurence (elected bishop)
- bef. 1257 – aft. 1257: Dompnalds
- bef. 1270 – aft. 1330: Makaboy
- bef. 1320 – aft. 1331: Cormac
- bef. 1408 – aft. 1408: Patrick
- bef. 1482 – aft. 1482: Gilbert
- bef. 1497 – 1497 (res.): Thomas Clerke
- bef. 1513 – aft. 1513: John Walles
- bef. 1534 – aft. 1534: ? Gorstellaw

=== Early modern ===
- 1546 – 1557: William McCrystyn
- bef. 1544 – bef. 1552 (d.): Gilbert Latham/de Latham/Lathum
- bef. 1557 – aft. 1561: Richard Gorstyllaw/Gorstale
- bef. 1577 – aft. 1582: Hugh Holland
- 1587 – 7 August 1633 (d.): John Phillips (also Archdeacon of Cleveland, 1601 – 1619; Bishop of Sodor and Man from 1605, when archdeacon in commendam)
- bef. 1595 – aft. 1594: Henry Curwyn (opposed Phillips)
- 1634 – bef. 1643: John Broxop
- bef. 1640 – 1661 (res.): Samuel Rutter
- bef. 1663 – 1667 (d.): Jonathan Fletcher
- 14 September 1667 – 1688 (d.): William Urquhart
- bef. 1689 – 12 April 1695 (d.): John Lomax/Loman
- 16 July 1696 – 1700 (res.): Archippus Kippax
- 10 June 1700 – 3 October 1701 (d.): Christopher Marsden
- 10 July 1703 – 20 December 1718 (d.): Samuel Wattleworth/Waltleworth
- 1718 – 25 May 1727 (res.): Robert Horrobin
- 6 September 1727 – 11 May 1760 (d.): John Kippax
- 18 July 1760 – 14 September 1787 (d.): William Mylrea
- 5 November 1787 – 7 December 1803 (res.): Lord George Murray
- 1803 – 1808: Lord Charles Murray-Aynsley
- 1808 – 1814 The Hon. George Murray
- 1814 – 29 March 1832 (d.): Daniel Mylrea (Note: Until 1814, Mylrea was rector of Ballaugh rather than of Andreas (which was customarily attached to the archdeaconry since the 16th century) because the rectors of Andreas (Lord Charles Murray-Aynsley and George Murray) were absent from the island.)
- 22 May 1832 – 25 June 1839 (res.): Benjamin Philpot
- 19 September 1839 – 8 February 1844 (d.): Cecil Hall
- 17 April 1844 – 26 February 1886 (d.): Joseph Moore

=== Late modern ===
- 1886 – 1894 (res.): Joshua Hughes-Games
- 1895 – 13 May 1912 (d.): Hugh Gill
- 1912 – 1938 (ret.): John Kewley (afterwards archdeacon emeritus)
- 1938 – 28 March 1958 (d.): Vincent Stockwood
- 1958 – 2 February 1964 (d.): Ernest Stenning
- 1964 – 1978 (ret.): Edward Glass (afterwards archdeacon emeritus)
- 1978 – 1982 (ret.): Arthur Clague
- 1982 – 1996 (ret.): David Willoughby
- 1996 – 2005 (ret.): Brian Partington (afterwards archdeacon emeritus)
- 2005 – 2011 (ret.): Brian Smith (afterwards archdeacon emeritus)
- 2011 – 2021 (ret.): Andie Brown
- 19 June 2022 – present: Irene Cowell

== Sources ==
- Le Neve, John; Hardy, Sir Thomas Duffus (1854). Archdeacons of Man . Fasti ecclesiae Anglicanae. Vol. 3. Oxford: Oxford University Press. pp. 329–330 – via Wikisource.
- Horn, Joyce M.; Smith, David M.; Mussett, Patrick (2004), Fasti Ecclesiae Anglicanae 1541–1857, vol. 11, pp. 146–150
