= Andy Brown (footballer, born 1963) =

English footballer

Personal information
- Full name: Andy Brown
- Date of birth: 17 August 1963 (age 63)
- Place of birth: Liverpool, England
- Position: Defender

Youth career
- Tranmere Rovers

Senior career*
Years	Team	Apps	(Gls)
1982–1983	Tranmere Rovers	1	(0)
- * Club domestic league appearances and goals

Andy Brown (born 17 August 1963) is a footballer who played as a defender. He made one (non-contracted) appearance in the Football League for Tranmere Rovers during the 1982–83 season.
