= Ballavarry Burial Mound =

Bronze Age site on the Isle of Man

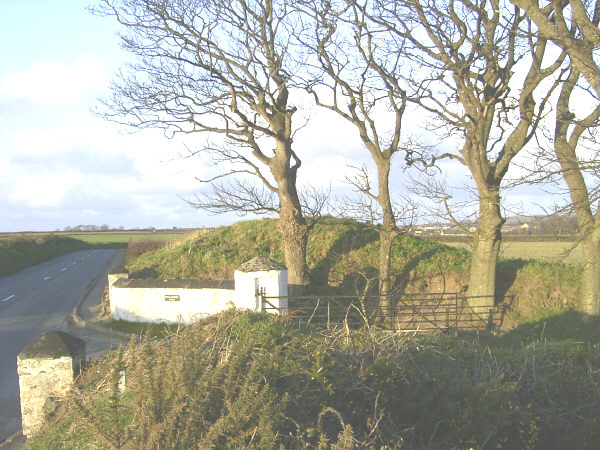
- Ballavarry Burial Mound with Andreas Village in the background.

- Map of the Isle of Man showing the location of Ballavarry Burial Mound
- Interactive map of Ballavarry Burial Mound
- 54.3592°N 4.457°W
- Periods: Bronze Age
- Location: Ballavarry Andreas
- Region: Isle of Man

Ballavarry Burial Mound is a Bronze Age burial mound in the parish of Andreas on the Isle of Man. It is located by Ballavarry farm entrance on a low hill, a short distance from Andreas village. The mound is significant and survives to a height of 3m and a diameter of 15m.

Although a burial urn was discovered during a 19th-century investigation of the mound, it has since been lost.
