= Andrew Brown (rugby union, born 20 April 1980) =

- Born: Andrew Brown; 20 April 1980 (age 46) Pontypool, Wales

Rugby union career
- Current team: Newport Gwent Dragons
Senior career
Years	Team	Apps	(Points)
2005–2011	Newport GD	30	(30)

Andrew Brown (born 20 April 1980, in Pontypool) is a Welsh rugby union player. He played for Cross Keys RFC, Newport RFC and Newport Gwent Dragons. He was released by Newport Gwent Dragons at the end of the 2010–11 season and joined Newport RFC, playing 277 games. Newport RFC hall of fame 2015.
