= Andreas, Isle of Man =

Village on the Isle of Man

Coordinates: 54.367°N 4.444°W

Andreas
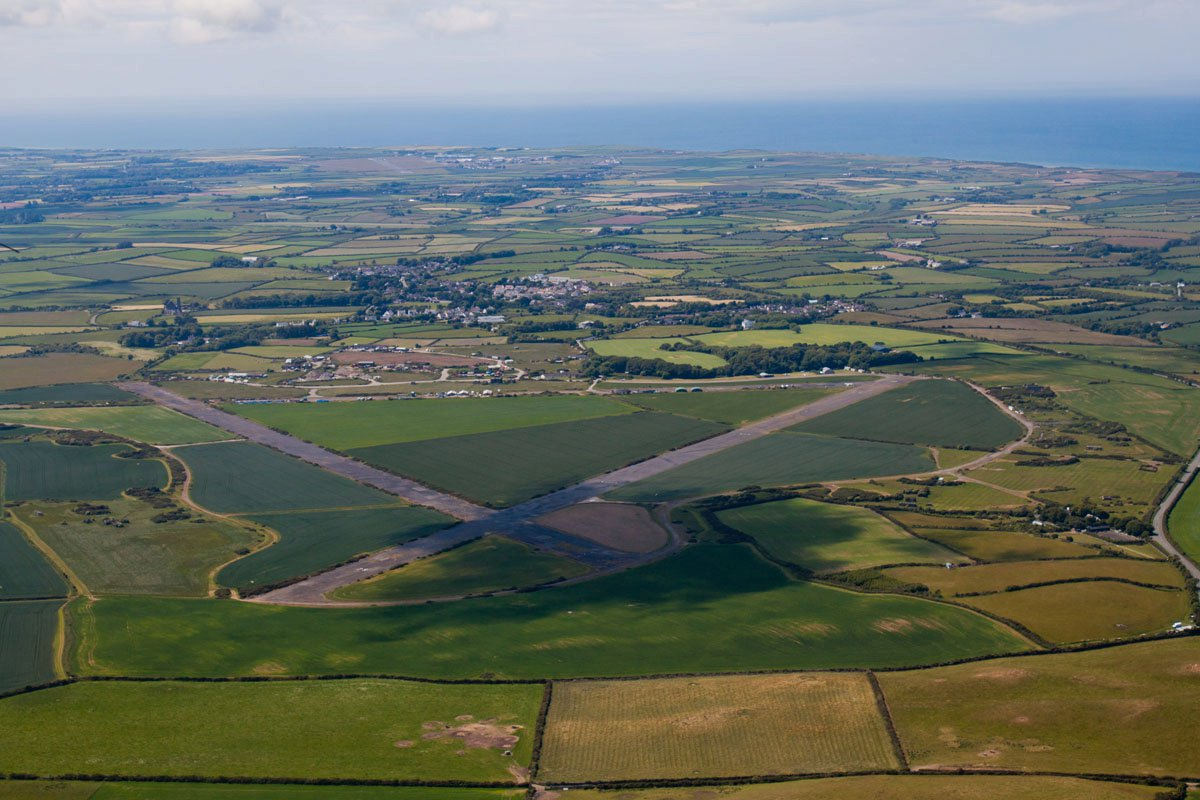
- Aerial view of Andreas Airfield with the village of Andreas in the background

- Location within the Isle of Man
- OS grid reference: SC413996
- Parish: Andreas
- Sheading: Ayre
- Crown dependency: Isle of Man
- Post town: ISLE OF MAN
- Postcode district: IM7
- Dialling code: 01624
- Police: Isle of Man
- Fire: Isle of Man
- Ambulance: Isle of Man
- House of Keys: Ayre & Michael

Andreas or Kirk Andreas (Manx: Andreas) is a village on the Isle of Man, lying in the north of the island, 5 km from the island's second town, Ramsey. There is a large, and nowadays little used, airfield in the vicinity.

== Location ==
Andreas lies at an altitude of about 20 metres, in the centre of the island's northern plain, in the parish of Andreas, which takes in part of the sandy lands known as the Curragh, and to the north contains low, rounded hills, lying between Port Cranstal and Blue Head. It is further within the sheading of Ayre.

A now little-used RAF airfield is about 1 km to the east of the village.

== History ==
Both the village and the parish take their name from Saint Andrew. Evidence for human habitation of the area stretches back to the pre-Christian era. The Bronze Age Ballavarry Burial Mound can be found a short distance outside the village.

St Andrew's Church, the parish church for Andreas, was most likely built on the site of a much older early Christian keeill (small chapel).

Several medieval Manx carved stone crosses with slabs have been discovered in the vicinity of the parish church. Eleven slabs are now on display in St Andrew's Church. Many of the crosses illustrate the shared Celtic and Norse history of the Isle of Man. For example, Thorwald's Cross has a Christian cross as its central theme but it also depicts Norse mythological figure Odin being devoured by the wolf Fenrir at the Battle of Ragnarök.

The old rectory in Andreas village was the most significant residential building in the village for centuries. William Blundell's A History of the Isle of Man (1648–1656) makes reference to the rectory during the time of Bishop Samuel Rutter. It is now a registered building.

For much of the history of the village, the community was primarily based around agriculture. In recent years many inhabitants of the village now commute daily to Ramsey or Douglas.

=== World War II ===
During the war the Royal Air Force Station Andreas was home to several squadrons, including 457 and 452 squadrons RAAF, 93 Squadron RAF, an Air Sea Rescue Squadron and No.11 Air Gunnery School. The airfield operated from 1941 to 1946, and had three runways. Subsequently, and up to the present day, it has limited use for agriculture light aircraft activity and gliding

There are also 23 military graves at St Andrew's Church from WWII.

== Access and facilities ==
=== Road links ===
The A9, A17, A19, B2, B3, and B14 roads all converge on the village. The nearest town, Ramsey, is 5 km to the south east of the village

The village is served by Bus Vannin routes and an on-demand service.

=== Education ===
The village has a primary school, Andreas Primary School, which takes children from ages 4 to 11. It also has a breakfast club. The school takes children from across a wide but defined area, some brought by government-sponsored bus. It was originally built in 1903, with the current building dating primarily from 1977. The school logo features a cross based on Viking cross-slabs in the village church, a Viking ship based on a local ship burial at Knock y Doonee and the Manx arms.

After year six, pupils generally attend either Queen Elizabeth II High School in Peel or Ramsey Grammar School in Ramsey.

=== Entertainment ===
There is also a parish hall, built in 1939, which hosts a youth club, the local Women's Institute, parties, exhibitions and sports such as badminton and bowls.

There is one pub and restaurant in the village, the Grosvenor. After temporarily closing in late 2019, it has since reopened.

=== Sport ===
Ayre United are based in the village. Founded there in 1967, they compete in the Isle of Man Football League and play their home games at Andreas Playing Fields where they have a clubhouse, built up from an old RAF building brought from Jurby airfield. They were the first club on the island to install floodlights. They won the Manx FA Cup in the 2002–3 season.

=== Religion ===
The first church in the vicinity was Cabbal Vaartyn (St Martin's Chapel) which has also been recorded as being named Keeil Colomb, on what today is the road between Andreas and The Lhen, and then, after the formation of regular parishes, between 1270 and 1344, a church was built in Andreas itself, dedicated to the village's patron saint, St Andrew.

The current building, St Andrew's Church, was built in 1802 with stone from Sulby Glen, and is the Anglican parish church, in the Church of England Diocese of Sodor and Man. A 120-foot bell tower was built in 1869, but reduced in height during World War II. The bell tower has never been restored to its original height.

In the south of the parish is St Jude's Chapel in St Judes.

== Local government and representation ==
The village has no separate local government, but the Parish of Andreas is overseen by Parish Commissioners, responsible for such aspects as public parks and leisure areas, street lighting and cleaning, certain housing matters and local roads.

Andreas is in the Keys constituency of Ayre & Michael.

== Gallery ==
Andreas, Isle of Man
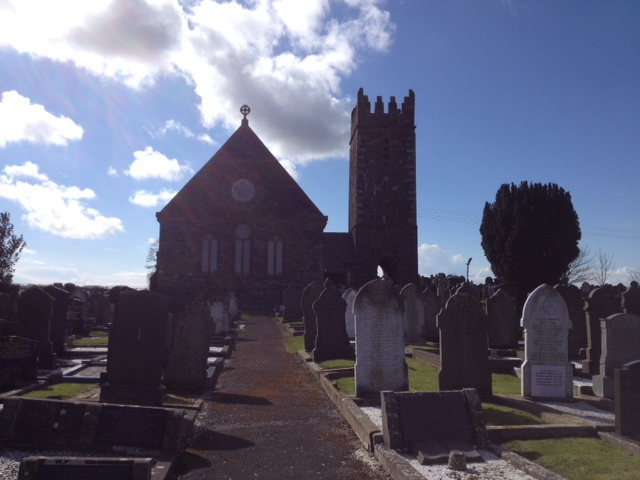
St Andrew's Church, Andreas

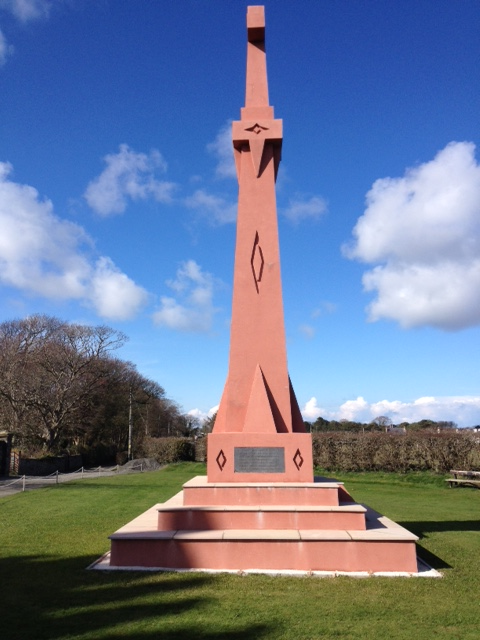
Andreas War Memorial

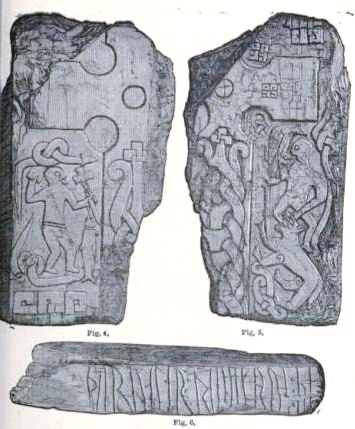
Thorwald's Cross Slab

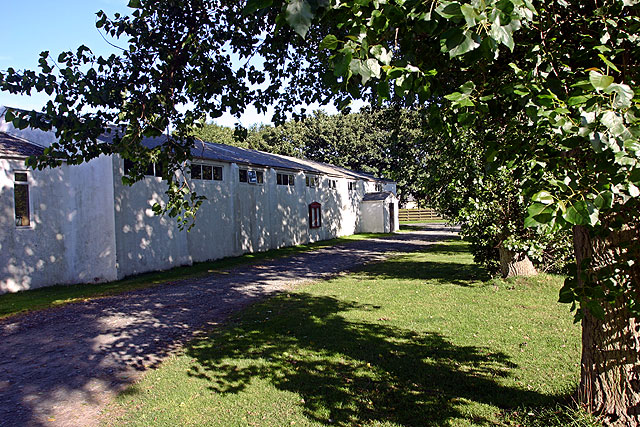
Andreas Village Hall

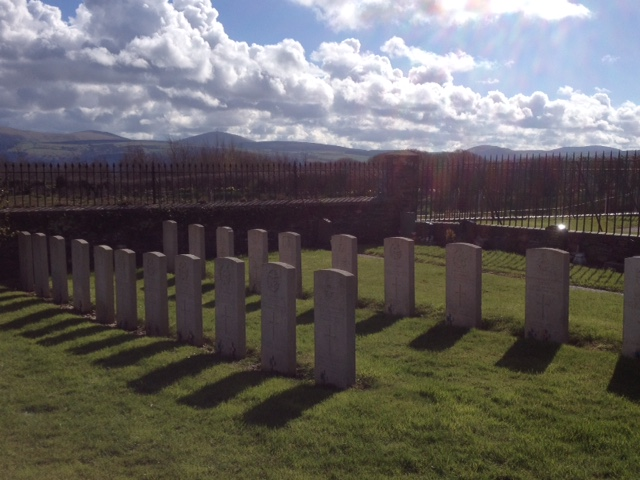
Military graves at Andreas Churchyard
