= Andrew Brown (Philadelphia Gazette) =

Andrew Brown (1744–1797) was an Irish soldier, journalist and congressional reporter. He was born in the north of Ireland about 1744, and was educated at Trinity College, Dublin, after which he joined the British army as an officer, serving in North America. According to

He settled in Massachusetts, and fought on the American side at Lexington, Bunker Hill, and elsewhere — was made Muster-Master-General in 1777, and afterwards Major. After the peace, he opened an academy for young ladies in Philadelphia, for which occupation, however, his irritable temper unfitted him. In 1788 he began to publish the Federal Gazette (changed in 1793 to the Philadelphia Gazette), the channel through which many of the friends of the federal constitution addressed the public. He was the first who regularly reported the debates in Congress. His death (on 4th February 1797) was caused by injuries received while fruitlessly endeavoring to save his wife and three children from the fire which destroyed his establishment eight days previously. His son Andrew until 1803 carried on the Gazette; but, taking the British side in politics, he became unpopular, and removed to England, where he died in 1847.
