= Bishop Wilson Theological College, Isle of Man =

Coordinates: 54.179°N 4.343°W

Bishop Wilson Theological College was founded as a theological college in 1879 to train Anglican clergy to serve in the Church of England. It was named after Thomas Wilson, Bishop of Sodor and Man between 1697 and 1755, located in part of Bishopscourt and closed in 1943.
