= Andie Brown =

Archdeacon of the Isle of man

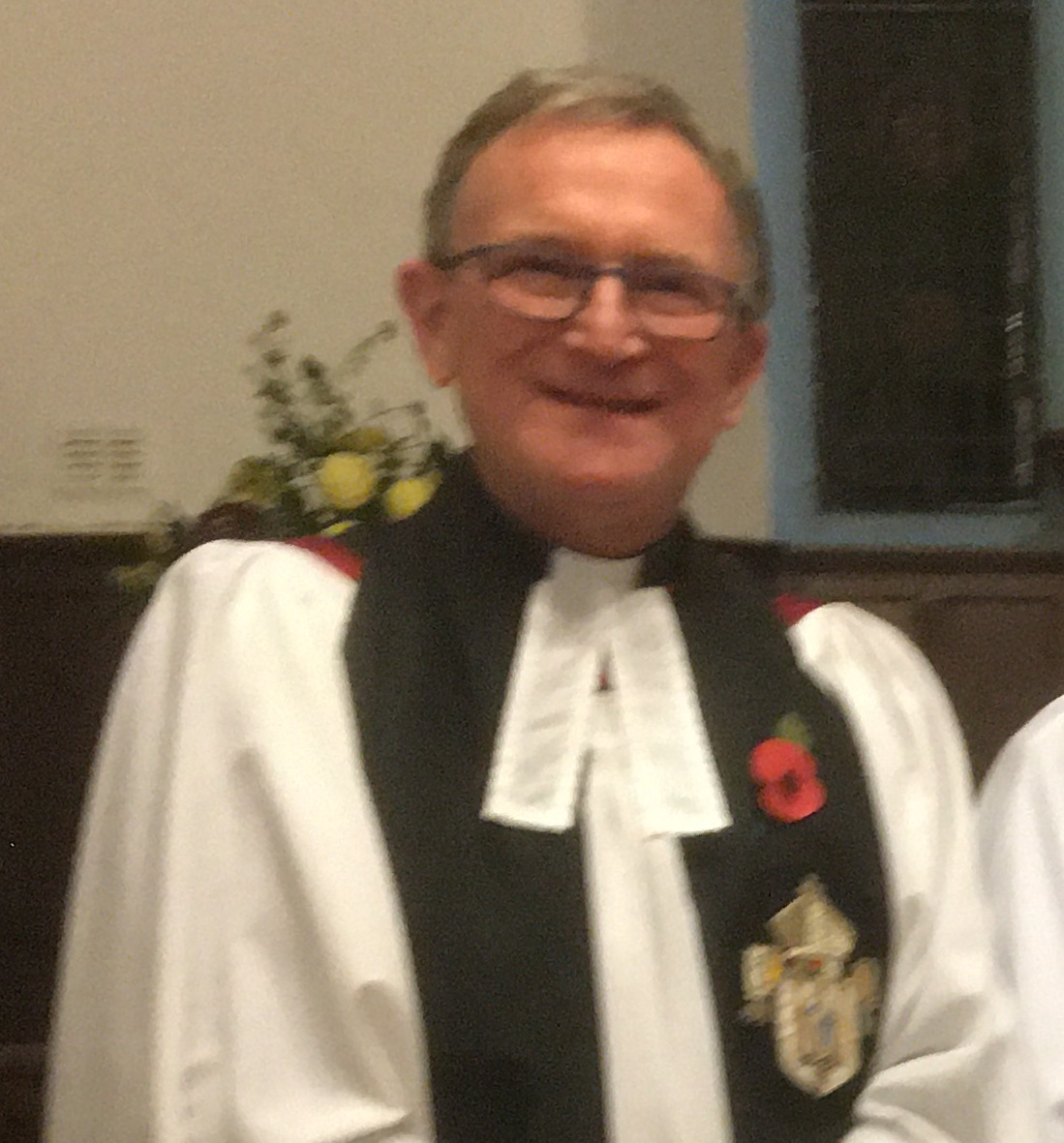
The Venerable Andie Brown in 2019

Andrew "Andie" Brown (born 18 September 1955, in Haslingden) is an Anglican priest. He was the Archdeacon of Man in the Church of England from October 2011 to July 2021.

Brown was educated at Haslingden Grammar School and St Peter's College, Oxford. He was ordained deacon in 1980 and ordained presbyter in 1981 and was a curate at Burnley Parish Church before becoming priest in charge of St Francis' Brandlesholme and then Vicar of St Peter's Ashton-under-Lyne. He then became the incumbent of St Luke's Halliwell from 1996 to 2003 and Canon Theologian and Continuing Ministerial Education Officer at Derby Cathedral from then until his position as an archdeacon. He retired July 2021.

Church of England titles
Preceded by Brian Smith	Archdeacon of Man; 2011–2021	Succeeded by Irene Cowell
