= Andy Brown (rugby league) =

Australian rugby league footballer

Personal information
- Full name: Andrew Brown
- Born: 26 April 1981 (age 45) Canberra, ACT, Australia

Playing information
- Position: Prop
Club
Years	Team	Pld	T	G	FG	P
≤2004–≥05	Fife Lions
Representative
Years	Team	Pld	T	G	FG	P
2004–05	Scotland	3	0	0	0	0

Andrew Brown (born 26 April 1981) is a former Scotland international rugby league footballer who played in the 2000s. He played at club level for the Fife Lions.

== Background ==
As Andy Brown, who was born in Canberra, Australia, has Scottish ancestors, he is eligible to play for Scotland due to the grandparent rule.

== International honours ==
Andy Brown won caps for Scotland while at Fife Lions in 2004 against Wales (sub), in 2005 against Wales (2 matches) (sub).
