= Andreas (parish) =

Parish on the Isle of Man

Coordinates: 54.367°N 4.445°W

Andreas: Manx: Skeerey Andreas
- Parish of Andreas, Isle of Man
- Population: 1,400 (2021)
- OS grid reference: SC4117599602
- Sheading: Ayre
- Crown dependency: Isle of Man
- Post town: ISLE OF MAN
- Postcode district: IM7
- House of Keys: Ayre & Michael

Andreas (/ˈændrəs/ AND-rəss or /ˈændriəs/ AND-ree-əss; Manx: Skeerey Andreas) is one of the seventeen parishes of the Isle of Man. It is located in the north of the island (part of the traditional North Side division) in the sheading of Ayre. The main settlement in the parish in the village of Andreas, which is also known as Kirk Andreas.

== History ==
There are several ancient monuments and sites located in the parish of Andreas. Ballavarry Burial Mound is a Bronze Age burial mound found a short distance outside of the village of Andreas.

Knock y Doonee is a significant historical and archaeological site in Andreas. Archaeological excavations on the area have uncovered a bilingual ogham stone in Latin and Ogham; a Christian keeill (a small chapel); a Christian carved stone cross; and a Viking Age boat burial.

Several carved stone crosses and slabs have been discovered in Andreas. Although many of the crosses are extant only as fragments and are located in the Manx Museum, Thorwald's Cross for example can be viewed at St Andrew's Church.

Several early Christian Manx keeills have been recorded throughout the parish although most have been destroyed when their remaining stones were removed for the construction of other buildings during the 19th century.

- Knock y Doonee keeill.
- Keeill Tushtag.
- Ballagonnell Keeill.
- Ardonan keeill.

== Geography ==
Andreas borders Jurby to the west, Bride to the east and Lezayre to the south. The Irish Sea is to the north.

The parish is low-lying. The most significant inland water feature is the Lhen Trench, which runs for about 7 km north–south, in parallel with the boundary with Jurby. To the north the Scottish Southern Uplands and the Mull of Galloway can sometimes clearly be seen. The total area is about 15 square miles (39 km^{2}).

The village of Andreas or Kirk Andreas is the only significant settlement in the parish. The nearest town, Ramsey, is 4 miles or 6 km away.

== Local government ==
For the purposes of local government, the whole of the historic parish forms a single parish district with Commissioners.

The Captain of the Parish (since 2003) is Dorothy Sayle.

== Politics ==
Andreas parish is part of the Ayre & Michael constituency, which elects two Members to the House of Keys. Before 2016 it was in the Ayre constituency.

== Demographics ==
The Isle of Man census of 2016 returned a parish population of 1,397, a decrease of 2.1% from the figure of 1,426 in 2011.

Andreas parish (census)
Year	1996	2001	2006	2011	2016	2021
Pop.	1,144	1,152	1,381	1,426	1,397	1,400
±%	—	+0.7%	+19.9%	+3.3%	−2.0%	+0.2%

== Landmarks ==
=== Churches ===
St Andrew's Church in Andreas village was built in 1802 using stone from Sulby Glen as there was no local stone quarries. Although a large 120 ft bell tower was added in 1860, it was dismantled in 1945 to improve the safety of nearby RAF Andreas. The bell tower has never been restored to its original height.

St Jude's Church is also located in the hamlet of St Jude's, was built in 1839.

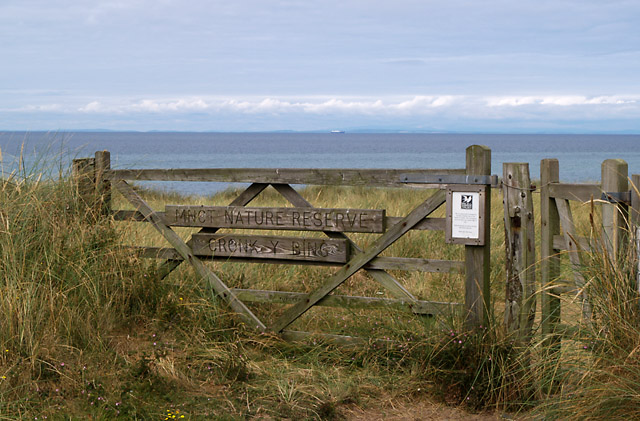
Entrance to the Cronk y Bing nature reserve at the Lhen Beach

=== Andreas Airfield ===
Near the middle of the parish is the former RAF Andreas airfield which operated between 1941 and 1946. It is home to a small number of privately owned light aircraft and also used by a gliding club.

=== Cronk y Bing Nature Reserve ===
Cronk y Bing is the site of a nature reserve in Andreas which extends all the way to the north tip of the Isle of Man at the Point of Ayre. It consists of heathland and extensive sand dunes. Plants such as marram grass, pyramidal orchid, and sea bindweed dominate the area.
