= Scarlett Radar Station =

Former Radar station on the Isle of Man

Scarlett
- Near Castletown, Isle of Man
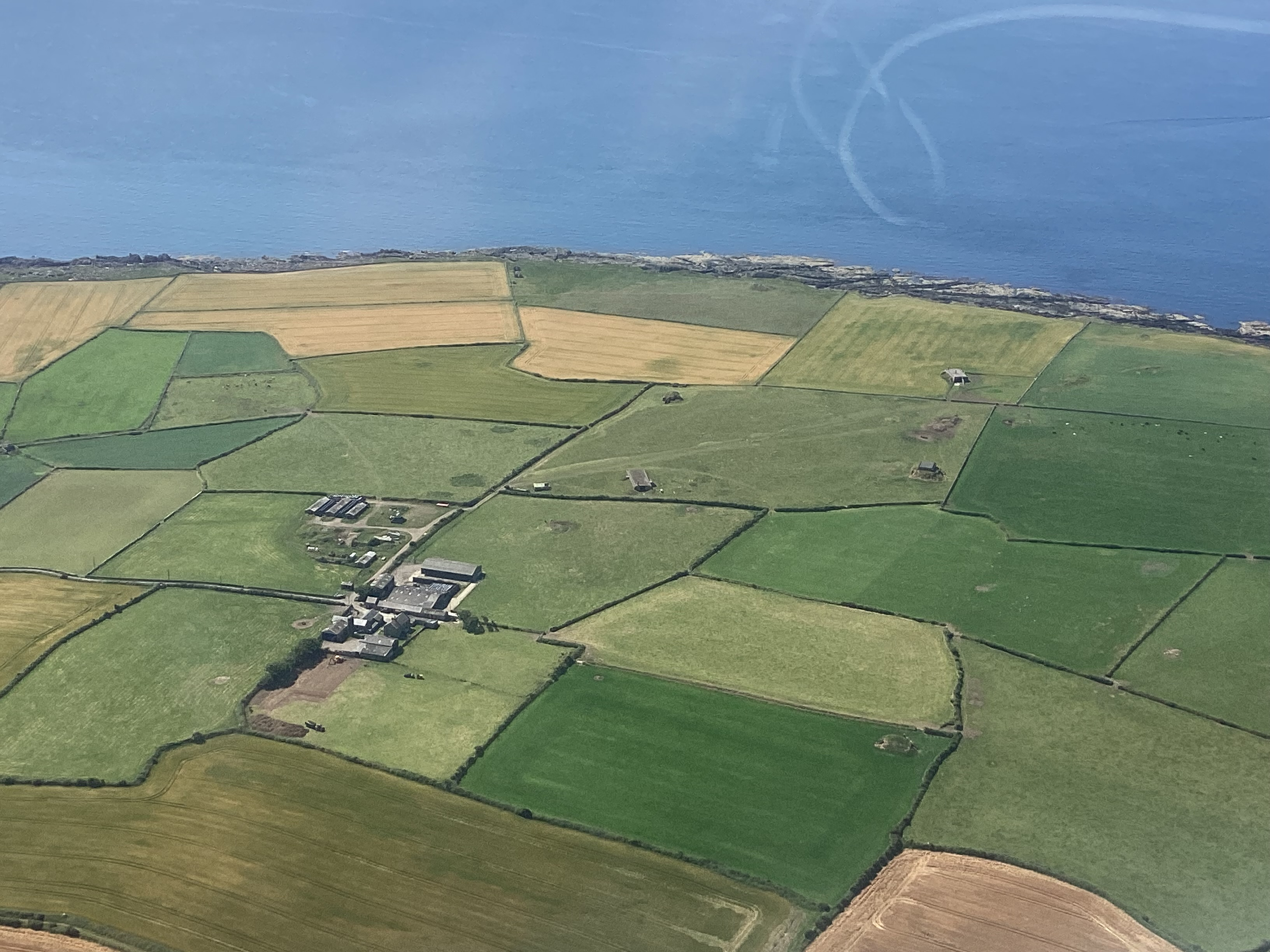
- Scarlett Farm and the buildings of the former Scarlett Radar Station, Scarlett, Isle of Man.

Site information
- Type: Chain Home Radar Station
- Owner: Air Ministry
- Operator: Royal Air Force

Location
- Location within the Isle of Man
- Coordinates: 54.065°N 4.655°W

Site history
- Built: 1940
- In use: 1940–1944

Scarlett Radar Station was a former Chain Home Radar Station located at Scarlett Point near Castletown, Isle of Man.

== History ==
Chain Home was the codename for the ring of coastal early warning radar Stations designed to detect and track aircraft.

This revolutionary concept was the first early warning radar network in the world, and the first military radar system to reach operational status. Its effect on the war made it one of the most powerful systems of what became known as the "Wizard War".

The strategic importance of the Isle of Man, with its central position within the Irish Sea, made the island an ideal location for the siting of radar stations as it offered a clear sweep along the airspace of Northwest England, Southwest Scotland, Northeast Ireland and North Wales.

Consequently, the Air Ministry identified two sites in early 1940 as suitable to fulfill this requirement; these being situated at Scarlett in the southeast and at Bride in the north.

=== Construction ===
Construction began immediately on land occupied by Scarlett Farm. Work carried on apace with both Bride and Scarlett Radar Stations becoming operational by September 1940.

As the station was needed as soon as possible, it was initially operated with shorter timber masts in order to support the transmitter arrays. These were later replaced by what were referred to as "standard west coast" steel masts manufactured from guyed steel standing at a height of 325 feet (99 m). These masts were tethered by thick steel guide ropes with the transmitter aerials suspended between the masts. The receiving aerials were mounted in two further wooden masts which stood at a height of 240 feet (73 m).

In addition to the aerial masts, the infrastructure of the station consisted of various technical buildings. These included one Type C receiver block and one Type C transmitter block together with Type B operations blocks, which were considerably larger than the C type. Power to the station was supplied by mains electricity augmented by a purpose-built generator house. The station's defences were manned by army personnel, who were housed in barrack blocks situated on site. There was additional accommodation for station personnel in nearby Castletown.

There were further developments at the station in 1941, with the construction of substantial blast-proof reinforced concrete buildings. These were constructed on the site of Scarlett Farm, and in keeping with the other structures on the site, were covered with camouflage netting.

=== Operational life ===
Principle of primary radar

Scarlett Radar Station became operational by the beginning of September 1940, being designated as an Advance Chain Home Installation (A.C.H.). The Scarlett Station was staffed by 60 WAAF and 63 RAF personnel, mainly consisting of officers and NCOs. Operating in four shifts the station was fully operational 24 hours a day, 365 days per year. The personnel reported to the filter room at R.A.F. Barton Hall, Preston.

The height and bearing of an aircraft would be calculated by WAAF operators in the operations room by the use of electronic and electro-mechanical aids at which point they would be assessed as being either 'friendly' or 'hostile.' Friendly aircraft were fitted with special radio equipment known as IFF (Identify Friend or Foe) which responded to the Chain Home Radar signals and allowed them to be verified on the radar display.

== Closure ==
Following the opening of a new Radar Station at Dalby in 1942 in addition to the station at Meayll Hill (pronounced ‘Mule’ Hill), Cregneash, the requirement for what were now becoming the obsolete stations at Scarlett and Bride diminished significantly.

With the completion of a new station at Dalby, both Scarlett and Dalby Stations ran simultaneously for a time to ensure unbroken cover. With the closure of Scarlett, Dalby remained the only Chain Home station on the island for the remainder of the war (Meayll Hill formed part of the Chain Home Low Network).

Scarlett was however retained on a standby basis, until it was finally declared surplus to requirement in 1944.

== Post-war and current use ==
After the end of the war, the island's Local Government Board inspected the former accommodation blocks at Scarlett with a view to their use as residential dwellings, to ease the shortage of housing on the island as a consequence of the war. Although found to be up to the required standard, the idea was not proceeded with and the site was returned to agricultural use.

Today the site of the former radar station still retains a number of the original camp buildings, including barrack blocks, air raid shelters and the guardhouse. The structures continue to form part of Scarlett Farm, and are used primarily for the keeping of livestock.

== See also ==
- List of former Royal Air Force stations
- RAF Andreas
- RAF Jurby
- RAF Jurby Head, an offshore bombing range
- 54 Air-Sea Rescue Marine Craft Unit RAF
- HMS Valkyrie
- HMS St George
- HMS Urley

== Sources ==
- Jones, Reginald Victor (1978). The Wizard War: British Scientific Intelligence 1939-1945. Coward, McCann & Geoghegan. ISBN 9780698108967.
- Neale, B. T. (1985). "CH - The First Operational Radar". The GEC Journal of Research. 3 (2): 73–83. "copy at The Radar Pages"
