= List of museums in the Isle of Man =

This is a list of museums in Isle of Man.
Manx National Heritage runs the following museums:

- Castle Rushen, Castletown
- Cregneash Folk Village, Cregneash
- Grove Museum, Ramsey
- House of Manannan, Peel
- The Great Laxey Wheel & Mines Trail, Laxey Wheel, Laxey
- Manx Aviation and Military Museum, Castletown
- Manx Museum, Douglas
- The Nautical Museum, Castletown
- The Old Grammar School, Castletown
- The Old House of Keys, Castletown
- Peel Castle, Peel
- Rushen Abbey, Ballasalla
- Sound Centre, Calf Sound, near Cregneash
- Niarbyl, Dalby Niarbyl

The Isle of Man Government Department of Infrastructure runs:

- Isle of Man Railway Museum

Volunteers run:

- Jurby Transport Museum
- Leece Museum
