= Manx Aviation and Military Museum =

Military museum in Castletown, Isle of Man

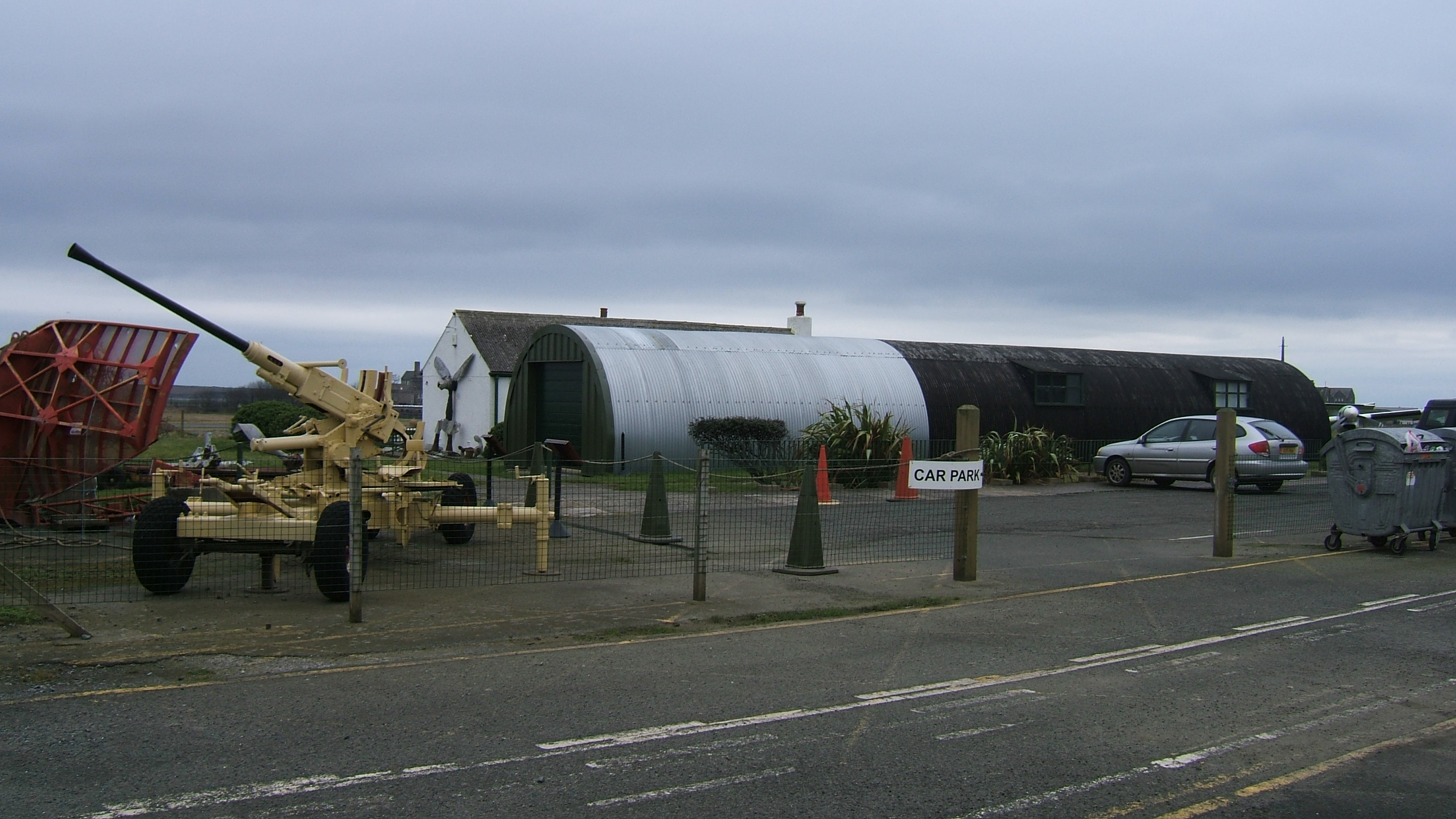
- The museum in February 2010

- Location within Isle of Man
- Established: 2000
- Coordinates: 54.0834°N 4.6376°W
- Type: Aviation museum
- Website: www.maps.org.im

The Manx Aviation and Military Museum is a museum dedicated to the history of aviation and the military on the Isle of Man. Established in 2000, the museum is run by volunteers and features c. 9,000 exhibits.

== The museum ==
The museum is located in Castletown, Isle of Man right next to Ronaldsway Airport to the south of the island on the main Douglas - Castletown road. It is open at the weekends throughout the year and every day from late May to the end of September. Visits at other times and guided tours can be arranged by appointment. Entry to the museum is free. The Museum was opened on Remembrance Day (11 November) 2000.

On display amongst the many pieces of wartime memorabilia is one of only a handful of fully restored Morris-Commercial C9/B self-propelled Bofors 40 mm guns.

Other displays cover RAF Jurby and RAF Andreas, the Isle of Man Home Guard, the history of Manx Airlines and a series of small exhibits called "One Man's War" which give brief details of the military service of named individuals in the RAF, Royal Navy and Army. One of these displays is dedicated to Polish pilot Stanislaw Podobinski of 303 Squadron, RAF, who died when his Spitfire crashed into high ground on the Isle of Man.

Since 2005 the Manx Regiment have displayed their exhibits here, after the Old Comrades Association closed their separate museum at Tromode.

== See also ==
- List of museums in the Isle of Man
