= HMS St George (shore establishment) =

- Douglas, Isle of Man

Site information
- Type: Military base
- Controlled by: Royal Navy

Location
- Coordinates: 54.145°N 4.482°W

Site history
- Built: September 1939
- In use: 1939–1945

HMS St George was a training facility of the Royal Navy which was located in Douglas, Isle of Man. It was the Navy's only Continuous Service Training Establishment.

== History ==
HMS St George opened in September 1939. The facility was divided in various component parts, classroom training taking place at the newly opened Ballakermeen High School with the cadets billeted at Cunningham's Holiday Camp which had been requisitioned for the duration and was located in the Little Switzerland area of Douglas. The holiday camp had previously served as a Prisoner of War Camp during the First World War. It occupied approximately 5 acres (2 hectares) and consisted of two parts bisected by Victoria Road.

The Commanding Officer of HMS St George when it was commissioned was Captain F.S. Bell with Captain A.J. Lowe being officer in charge of Ballakermeen School. A staff of over 300 officers would provide cadets with practical and technical training. Classroom work at Ballakermeen was supplemented by instructional films and technical experiments. Separate classrooms were allocated for cadets of different branches of the service, each class consisting of approximately 25–30 cadets.

During the course of the war, 8,677 cadets passed their training at HMS St George.

HMS St George was paid off on Thursday 20 December 1945, with the officers and ratings leaving the Isle of Man and relocating to HMS Ganges, Shotley.

== See also ==
- HMS Valkyrie
- HMS Urley
- RAF Andreas
- RAF Jurby
- RAF Jurby Head
