= HMS Valkyrie (shore establishment) =

Coordinates: 54.151°N 4.477°W

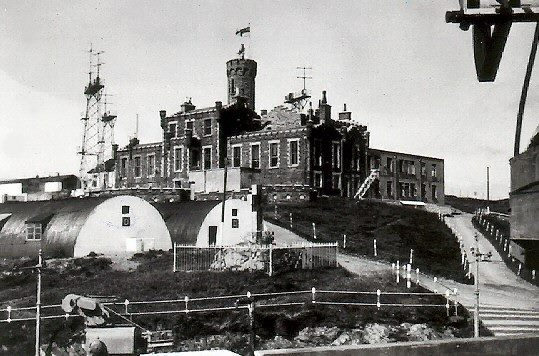
- HMS Valkyrie No. 1 Radar Training School Royal Navy

History

Isle of Man
- Name: HMS Valkyrie
- Commissioned: October 1941
- Decommissioned: 31 December 1946
- Nickname(s): 'The Valkyrie'
- Fate: Decommissioned and operational elements dispersed

General characteristics
- Class & type: Stone frigate

HMS Valkyrie was a shore establishment or "stone frigate" of the Royal Navy located in Douglas, Isle of Man. The establishment was split into two component parts, Valkyrie I and Valkyrie II.

== History ==
HMS Valkyrie was established as the Royal Navy's No. 1 Radar Training School, its personnel billeted in a number of guest houses which had been requisitioned for the duration and which were situated on Loch Promenade, Douglas. The training was undertaken at a series of buildings on Douglas Head, one being the Douglas Head Hotel, and one of which today is occupied by Manx Radio.

HMS Valkyrie was commissioned in October 1941. Much of the early work involving Radar took place at Douglas Head with investment in the required equipment totaling £3,000,000 (£146,864,930 as of 2018).

The training school worked in conjunction with a Sea Hurricane of the Fleet Air Arm which belonged to 772 Squadron (FAA) and was based at RAF Andreas. The aircraft was employed to provide simulated attack conditions. The Hurricane was replaced in October 1944, after crashing on Douglas Head, killing the pilot Sub Lieutenant Robert Paton.

During the operation of No. 1 Radar Training School, Douglas Head was closed to the public which meant no access to Port Soderick was available via the Marine Drive, which had been a popular recreational area for tourists before the war.

=== HMS Valkyrie II ===
HMS Valkyrie II was commissioned in September 1943, to train signal men and wireless telegraphy ratings for landing craft assembling for D-Day as existing establishments could not provide sufficient personnel in time. To meet this requirement men were transferred from the Army and RAF, and at the peak period 2,500 ratings were under training on a six months course. The messing problem of this huge commitment was solved by supplying the food from naval sources and cooking it at the Empress and Palace hotels under the supervision of civilian contractors. The Palace Dance Hall was converted into a vast mess hall where 1,200 ratings could sit down together for a meal.

A section of Douglas Beach was closed off to the public for training, much of which necessarily took place outdoors.

By the time of the Invasion of France, Valkyrie II's function had ceased and the establishment was paid off in March 1944.

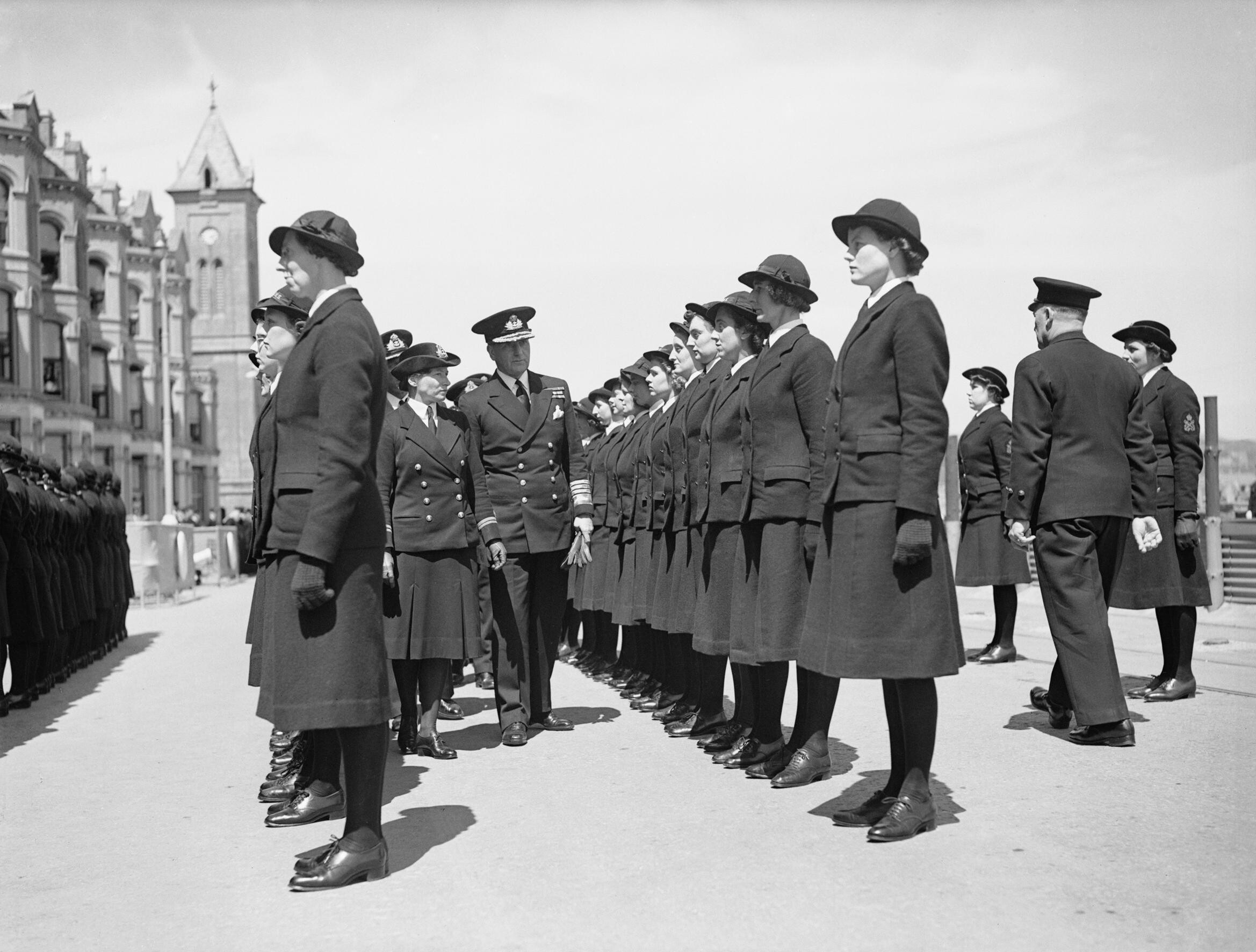
Admiral Sir Percy Noble KCB, CVO, Commander in Chief Western Approaches, inspecting WRNS during a visit to HMS Valkyrie.

=== Decommissioning ===
On the cessation of hostilities plans were put in place to decommission HMS Valkyrie. At 16:00hrs on Monday 30 December 1946, the White Ensign at HMS Valkyrie was lowered for the last time. The premises on Douglas Promenade were vacated and this was followed by the premises on Douglas Head which were vacated on 31 January 1947, at the conclusion of the decommissioning ceremony.

During the lifetime of HMS Valkyrie over 30,000 naval ratings passed through the Royal Navy's No. 1 Radar Training School.

=== French Detachment ===
HMS Valkyrie was responsible for the training of Radar operators from various countries and in addition it became home to a detachment from the French Navy who underwent Radar training at the establishment. Under the command of Lieutenant Jean Colin, the detachment arrived at the commencement of the Valkyrie's commission and from June 1943 over 400 French sailors were trained in Douglas.

== Notable personnel ==
- Jon Pertwee: Pertwee served at the establishment during the course of which he was instrumental in the formation of an amateur dramatic society, the Service Players, of which he was made an honorary life member.

== See also ==
- HMS St George
- HMS Urley
- RAF Andreas
- RAF Jurby
- RAF Jurby Head
- RAF Training Flying Control Centre
