= Ronaldsway culture =

Neolithic inhabitants of the Isle of Man

The Ronaldsway Culture was the way of life of a Stone Age people on the Isle of Man. Sometimes referred to as Manx Ronaldsway, it dates from the later Neolithic and from the third millennium BC, but more precise dating is a matter of debate.

The culture, known only from the Isle of Man, is named after the archaeological remains of a settlement excavated at Ronaldsway Airport (now the Isle of Man Airport) in 1939 during a Second World War expansion, where a large quantity of material was found. These remains were later dated to between 2,200 and 1,900 BC.

The culture is characterized by deep jars called Ronaldsway-style pots, stone axes with butts which have been roughened, and unusual flint tools; where it meets other cultures there have been finds of shared monuments, including stone circles, passage and entrance graves, and henges. It also has structures entirely of its own. The culture's typical polished axe has been met with nowhere else and shows an especially marked insularity.

It has been suggested that the distinctive characteristics of the Ronaldsway culture mean that during at least part of the late Neolithic age the people of the Isle of Man developed independently from those in Britain and Ireland.

== See also ==
- History of the Isle of Man
