= RAF Training Flying Control Centre =

Royal Air Force Training Flying Control Centre
- Ramsey, Isle of Man in Isle of Man

Site information
- Type: Non-flying Air Traffic Advisory Centre
- Owner: Isle of Man Government
- Operator: Royal Air Force
- Condition: Closed

Location
- Location in Isle of Man
- Coordinates: 54.3199°N 4.3956°W

Site history
- Built: 1933
- In use: 1941–1945
- Fate: Reverted to educational use.
- Battles/wars: European Theatre of World War II (1941–1945)

Garrison information
- Past commanders: Wing Commander Bullimore
- Garrison: RAF Training Command; No. 9 Group RAF

The RAF Training Flying Control Centre was an early form of Aircraft Area Control Centre, the first of its kind in the world. It was situated at Ramsey Grammar School, Isle of Man.

== Operational Role ==
=== 1941 - 1943 ===
Requisitioned by the Air Ministry, Ramsey Grammar School became the Operations Room for the fighter station at RAF Andreas when the station became operational in 1941. During that time information concerning all enemy aircraft flying in the area of the Irish Sea was processed by the Operations Room with aircraft being plotted on a large map, it then being the duty of the Operations Controller to task such fighters as was necessary to intercept; the Operations Room being particularly busy during raids on Liverpool, Glasgow and Belfast. With the resulting strategic shift of the Luftwaffe following the German Invasion of Russia (Operation Barbarossa) RAF Andreas became a training station and the Operations Room in turn became redundant.

However, with the multitude of RAF Stations situated around the Irish Sea area, considerable difficulty began to be experienced concerning the controlling of the various aircraft which were undertaking the training of numerous navigators, air gunners, bomb aimers and wireless operators. The training sorties took the pupils over the sea, and it was considered necessary to set up an organisation which would be able to maintain radio contact with the aircraft at any stage of their exercises, in order to pass meteorological conditions and instructions necessary to their safety.

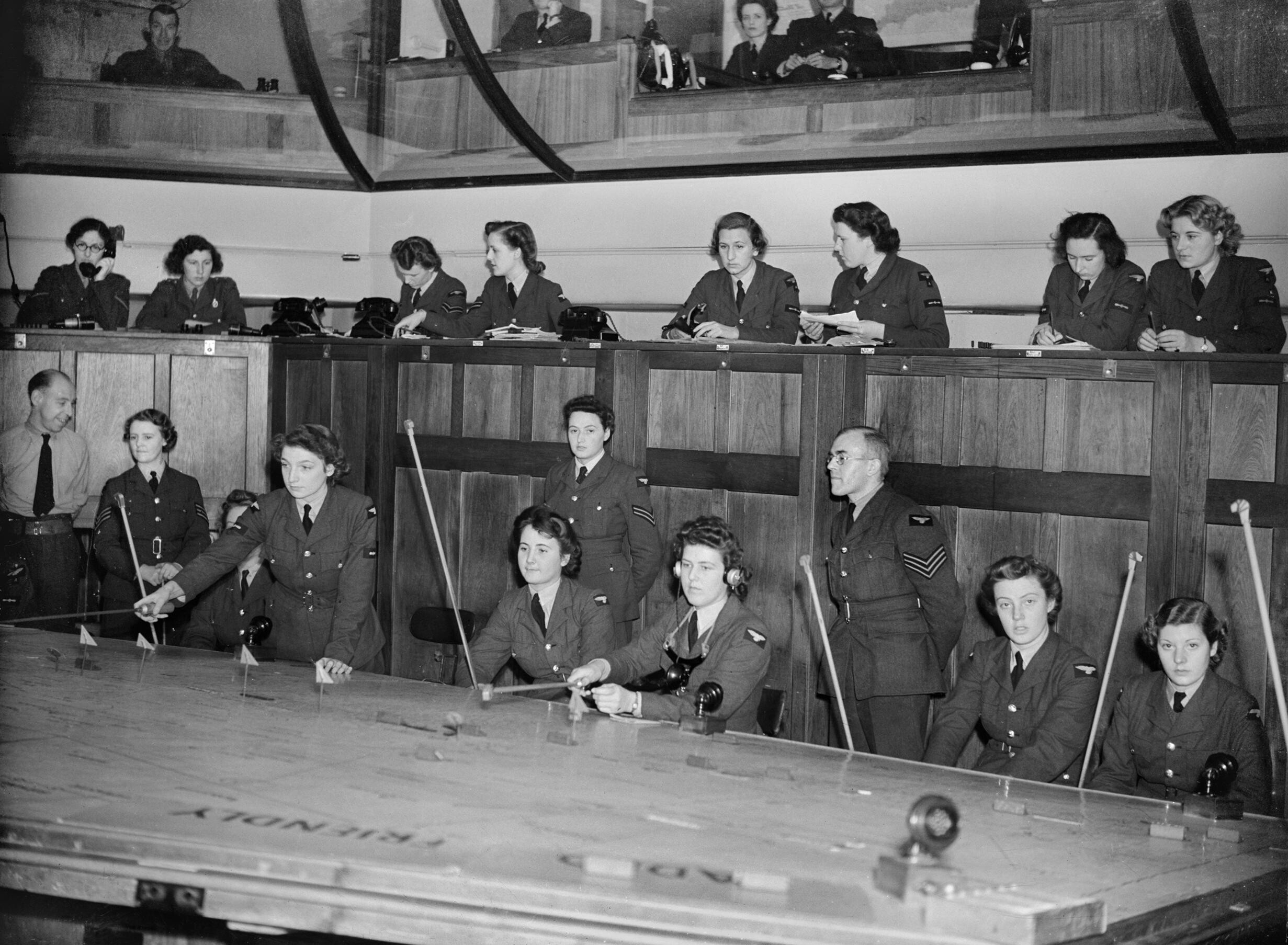
WAAF plotters at work in an RAF Operations Room.

=== 1943 - 1945 ===
In March 1943 a unit known as the Training Flying Control Centre (TFCC) was formed for this purpose being headed by Wing Commander Bullimore. The TFCC at Ramsey was the only organisation of its type in the whole Royal Air Force, and its layout was peculiar to the work it was required to carry out. The officers responsible for the setting up of the operation had no previous experience or pattern to guide them, except such experience as had been gained in the Operation Control Rooms of Fighter Command. The operations of such however had relied on the co-operation from the Observer Corps and RADAR information from which was used to plot the positions of friendly and hostile aircraft alike, and although this was satisfactory for the purpose intended it was entirely inapplicable to the problems which faced the creators of the TFCC.

During the peak period of operations, the Station was responsible for the safety of training aircraft from ten separate stations, and it was not uncommon for the Controller and his duty watch of Women's Auxiliary Air Force (WAAFs) and airmen to be responsible for the safety of over 200 aircraft flying at the same time, each carrying an average crew of five.

The system of control was highly technical; the Operations Room being divided into three parts:

- Signals Interception Room. This was staffed by WAAFs who would listen out for all signals passed between aircraft for which the Station was responsible.
- Navigation Room. This is where the positions of the aircraft were mapped out using the bearing which had been intercepted by the wireless operators.
- Operations Room. This is where the information gathered would be plotted on the large plotting table.

The Operations Room could therefore be described as the main source of information regarding any form of aircraft distress in any part of the Western and Northwestern seaboards of the British Isles. The Controller was responsible for informing the various air sea and mountain rescue services and for generally collecting and passing on all information to the different parties concerned.

Due to the mountainous character of the Isle of Man together with its often challenging meteorological conditions it became apparent that additional aids to assist aircraft in distress were necessary. A ring of large searchlights were positioned around the Island for the purpose of directing aircraft away from high ground and towards the Island's three air bases- RAF Andreas, RAF Jurby and RNAS Ronaldsway.

One such example of the efficiency of the operation was demonstrated during an incident in the winter of 1944. On that occasion a Vickers Wellington bomber was forced to ditch in the sea off Maughold Head and the SOS was intercepted at the TFCC. Within a matter of minutes the Coastguard had been alerted and distress signals were spotted off Maughold Head. In turn an air sea rescue launch was scrambled from the RAF's Air Sea Rescue Station at North Shore Road, Ramsey, and the coastguard was requested to illuminate the scene of the ditching with a searchlight. Within 26 minutes of the SOS being intercepted the five Canadian airmen were being landed at the Queen's Pier, Ramsey.

Another instance was when an aircraft crash landed on the top of Snaefell. The wireless operator was able to work his set and a message was intercepted at Ramsey, the bearing of which was received by the controller who was able to work out the position of the aircraft. A message was sent to the crew asking them to fire flares and every coastguard was briefed to take a bearing of any such signals visible. In a short time the aircraft was located and within 30 minutes of the crash the crew had been rescued.

=== Royal Visit ===
The centre was visited by Their Majesties King George IV and Queen Elizabeth on Wednesday July 4, 1945, as part of their two day trip to the Isle of Man during which the King officiated at the Tynwald Day Ceremony.

== Closure ==
With the ending of hostilities the Royal Air Force Training Flying Control Centre's operations were wound down. The facility was derequisitioned and closed in the Autumn of 1945.

Following a period of approximately 18 months the buildings in which the centre was housed re-opened as part of Ramsey Grammar School.
