= 54 Air-Sea Rescue Marine Craft Unit RAF =

54 Air-Sea Rescue Marine Craft Unit
- Isle of Man

Site information
- Type: Air-Sea Rescue Marine Craft Unit; Royal Air Force station
- Owner: Ministry of Defence
- Controlled by: Royal Air Force (1939-60s)

Location
- Coordinates: 54.321111°N 4.384444°W

Site history
- Built: 1939
- In use: September 1939 -1960s
- Battles/wars: Second World War

54 Air-Sea Rescue Marine Craft Unit was a Royal Air Force Air-Sea Rescue Unit based on the Isle of Man which operated watercraft in support of RAF operations. The unit was active from the outbreak of the Second World War until the 1960s and consisted of RAF rescue launches being based around the Island at its principle ports; Douglas, Castletown, Peel and Ramsey.

== History ==
Part of the development of RAF Jurby saw the creation of an RAF boat station at Ramsey. Air Ministry officials visited Ramsey in September 1938 as final plans for the station were drawn up. The station comprised a slipway and a boathouse with accommodation for 30 personnel. Two plots of land were required for the construction of the slipway and boathouse, the land concerned being on North Shore Road. The purpose of the station was to provide boats for the towing of the targets to be used in the bombing ranges and also to provide protection for the ranges. With the coming of war and the expansion of operations this boat station would evolve, becoming an RAF Air Sea Rescue Station.

With the multitude of RAF Stations situated around the Irish Sea area, considerable difficulty began to be experienced concerning the controlling of the various aircraft which were undertaking the training of numerous navigators, air gunners, bomb aimers and wireless operators. The training sorties took the pupils over the sea, and it was considered necessary to set up an organisation which would be able to maintain radio contact with the aircraft at any stage of their exercises, in order to pass meteorological conditions and instructions necessary to their safety.

In March 1943, a unit known as the Training Flying Control Centre (TFCC) was formed for this purpose being headed by Wing Commander Bullimore. The TFCC was situated at what today is Ramsey Grammar School and was the only organisation of its type in the whole Royal Air Force, its layout being peculiar to the work it was required to carry out.

During the peak period of operations, the Station was responsible for the safety of training aircraft from ten separate stations, and it was not uncommon for the Controller and his duty watch of WAAFs and Airmen to be responsible for the safety of over 200 aircraft flying at the same time, each carrying an average crew of five.

The TFCC could therefore be described as the main source of information regarding any form of aircraft distress in any part of the Western and Northwestern seaboards of the British Isles. The Controller was responsible for informing the various air-sea rescue stations and for generally collecting and passing on all information to the different parties concerned.

One such example of the efficiency of the operation was demonstrated during an incident in the winter of 1944. On that occasion a Wellington Bomber was forced to ditch in the sea off Maughold Head and the SOS was intercepted at Ramsey. Within a matter of minutes the Coastguard had been alerted and distress signals were spotted off Maughold Head. In turn the air sea rescue launch was scrambled from Ramsey and the coastguard was requested to illuminate the scene of the ditching with a searchlight. Within 26 minutes of the SOS being intercepted the five Canadian airmen were being landed at the Queen's Pier, Ramsey.

With the introduction of the Westland Wessex and later the Westland Sea King into RAF service, the number of rescue launches began to decline significantly and the decision was taken to disband 54 Air-Sea Rescue Marine Craft Unit in the 1960s.

Today a plaque, commemorating the work carried out by 54 Air-Sea Rescue Marine Craft Unit, can be seen opposite the entrance to the Isle of Man Sea Terminal in Douglas.

== See also ==
- Royal Air Force Marine Branch
- RAF Training Flying Control Centre
- RAF Jurby
- RAF Andreas
