= RAF Andreas =

Former RAF base in northern Isle of Man

RAF Andreas
- IATA: none; ICAO: none

Summary
- Airport type: Military
- Owner: Air Ministry
- Operator: Royal Air Force
- Location: Andreas, Isle of Man
- Built: 1940
- In use: 1941–1946
- Elevation AMSL: 112 ft (34 m)
- Coordinates: 54°22′15″N 004°25′25″W

Map
- Location in Isle of Man

Runways
Direction	Length		Surface
Direction	ft	m	Surface
06/24	3,280	1,000	Asphalt
11/29	3,280	1,000	Asphalt
17/35	3,280	1,000	Asphalt
- Operational dates.

Royal Air Force Andreas or more simply RAF Andreas is a former Royal Air Force station in the Isle of Man which was operational between 1941 and 1946. It was built in fields between Andreas and Bride in the north of the island. As was common practice, the station was named after the parish in which it was situated.

== History ==
=== Construction ===
When the Luftwaffe began to attack British cities under the cover of darkness in October 1940, the North West of England with its industrial centres and ports came within easy reach of German aircraft operating from occupied France. The first fighter squadron had arrived on the Isle of Man at nearby RAF Jurby in November 1940, and came under the control of the newly formed No. 9 Group RAF, Fighter Command. Group Control was positioned at RAF Barton Hall, near Preston, and its sectors covered Lancashire, Cheshire and Shropshire. Andreas was to be a separate sector with responsibility for the Irish Sea and its surrounds. The new wing of Ramsey Grammar School was commissioned as Control Centre for the sector and was hastily prepared before the arrival of the new fighters at Jurby. The Control Centre was linked to the three radar stations at Dalby, Scarlett and Bride.

Andreas was chosen as the site of a fighter airfield because of its central location with regard to Liverpool, Belfast and Glasgow; it was in an excellent position to protect the vital shipping arriving at these ports. Finally, with the compensation payments agreed, work on the construction of RAF Andreas began in earnest by the end of June 1940. A total of 500 acres (200 ha) of farmland was earmarked, 200 acres (80 ha) coming from both Ballaghaue Farm and Braust Farm, and a small portion of land was acquired which stretched into the adjacent parish of Bride.

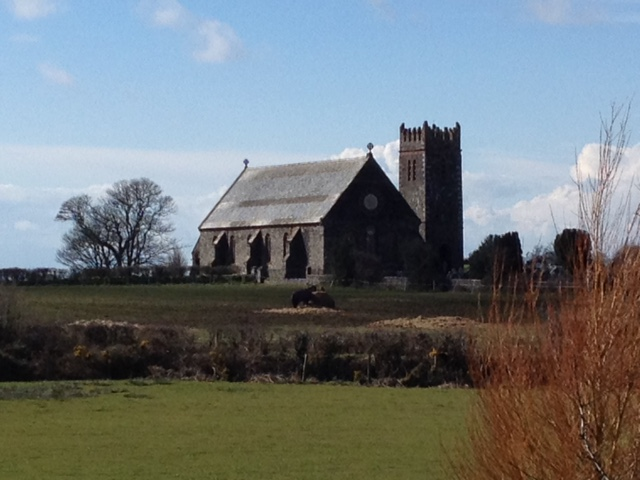
St Andrew's Church, Andreas. The tower was reduced on the request of the Air Ministry as it was seen as a danger to operations from the base.

By the spring of 1941 the airfield, to be built to the full specification of an operational fighter station, was beginning to take shape. The main NE/SW runway was 1,100 yards (1,000 m) long and 50 yards (46 m) wide and was obviously meant to take larger aircraft than fighters. From the perimeter track there was access to the flight dispersals area in which a total of 24 blast pens (or E pens) were built, half to provide protection for the fighters while larger ones were for twin-engined aircraft. Considerable thought had also gone into the airfield's defences, with the whole area being surrounded by 5-foot-high (1.5 m) roller concertina barbed wire, with gaps located at the main entrance and crash gates and by a tarmacadamed perimeter track over 3 miles (4.8 km) in distance.

RAF Andreas was designed as a dispersed airfield with many components of the base located in the village of Andreas; so that the domestic side and living quarters were a considerable distance from the technical side. There was also a dance and entertainments hall in the village and a farm on the Station.

In summer 1941 the first RAF personnel arrived at Andreas. These were mainly a flight of Royal Air Force Police, whose first duties were to guard the stores kept in the completed hangars. Also arriving at that time were Motor Transport drivers and soldiers of the Wiltshire Regiment, under the command of Major G.K. Wait MC, who arrived to man the airfield's defences, along with the first of many WAAFs who were to staff the administration offices and operations rooms. The station officially opened in August 1941, the first commanding officer of RAF Andreas being Group Captain J. Marson.

== Fighter Command ==
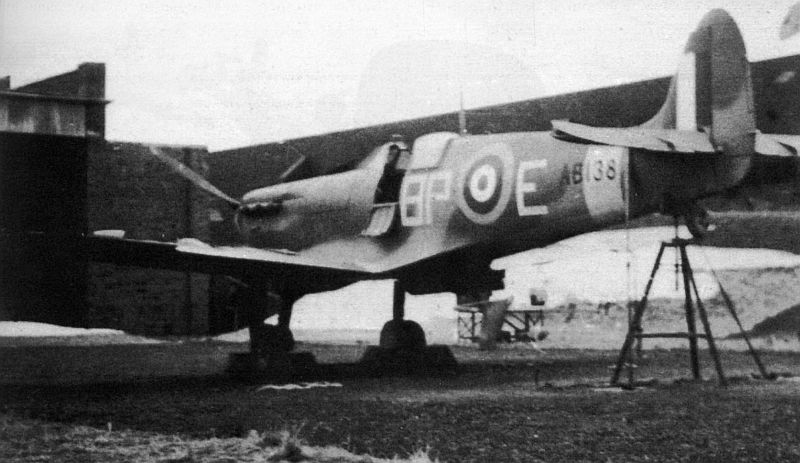
A Spitfire MkVb of 457 Squadron undergoing gun calibration at RAF Andreas.

=== 457 Squadron ===
457 Squadron badge.jpeg

By October 1941, RAF Andreas was ready to receive the first of No. 457 Squadron RAAF (457 Sqn) Spitfires from RAF Jurby as a prelude to working up to operational efficiency. This work-up would take six months, however the transfer of 457 Sqn's ground crew and administrative staff brought welcome relief to the congestion at Jurby. During this work-up period the Air Ministry insisted that the height of Andreas church tower be reduced, as it was a hazard, and in line with the southern end of the main runway. The church tower was originally 120 feet (37 m) high, and the most striking feature of the island's northern plain, being visible throughout the parish.

RAF Andreas had become fully operational in March 1942, but by now 457 Sqn was ready to move south to join No. 11 Group RAF (11 Grp) at RAF Redhill and to take part in air strikes over northern France.

=== 452 Squadron ===
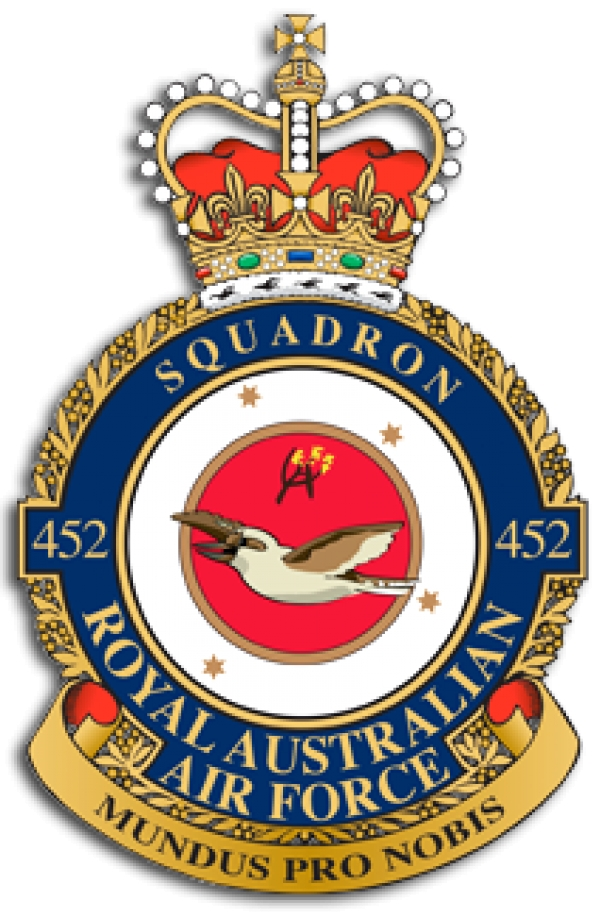
RAF312Sq

Following the departure of 457 Squadron, it was immediately replaced by No. 452 Squadron RAAF (452 Sqn), which had been formed in April 1941 and whose most celebrated pilot was the maverick Irishman, Paddy Finucane.

In June 1942, 452 Sqn's tenure at Andreas came to an end when the squadron returned to Australia, sailing on 21 June, arriving in Melbourne on 13 August and re-assembled at RAAF Richmond, as No. 452 Squadron RAAF, on 6 September.

=== 93 Squadron ===
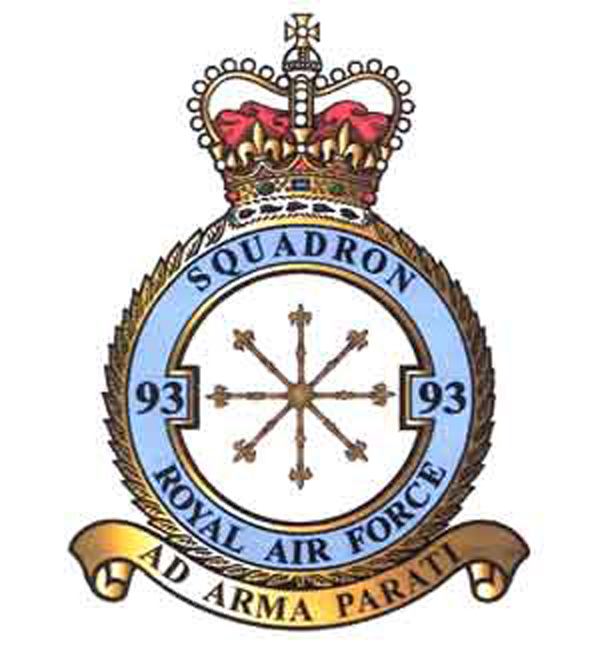
RAF312Sq

The third fighter unit to occupy RAF Andreas was No. 93 Squadron RAF (93 Sqn) which had an entirely different background, previously having been involved in the development of night fighter tactics using Havocs equipped with radar and Turbinlite searchlights.

No. 93 Sqn reformed at Andreas as an entirely new squadron equipped with Supermarine Spitfire VBs as it worked up to operational efficiency. Considerable time was spent over the air-to-ground firing range along the Ayres coastline at Smeale, which had been constructed not long after the first fighters had arrived at RAF Jurby. When Andreas airfield was under construction, the coastline north of Smeale had been heavily mined as a precaution against an enemy landing. After four months, 93 Sqn was ready to move on to more direct action, and was ordered to relocate to Algiers ready for the North African landings as part of Operation Torch.

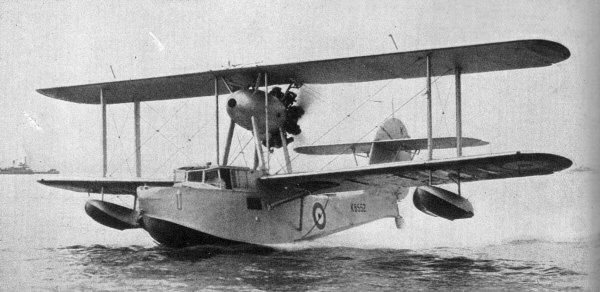
Supermarine Walrus

=== 275 Squadron ===
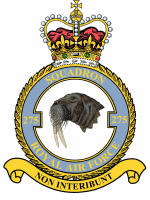
RAF312Sq

In November 1941 RAF Andreas received a detachment from 275 Squadron (275 Sqn) which served as 9 Group's Air Sea Rescue Unit and which covered the Irish Sea. The Squadron had its administrative headquarters at RAF Valley, Anglesey, and the detachment's amphibian Walrus Mk.Is flying boats were often to be seen flying around the island.

=== 776 Squadron (FAA) ===
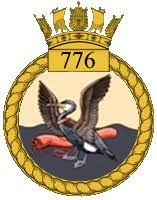
FAA776Sq

Another resident at Andreas were aircraft of the Fleet Air Arm. They belonged to No. 776 Squadron which operated various types of aircraft in its role as a Fleet Requirements Unit. The squadron was administered from RNAS Stretton (HMS Blackcap) with the aircraft detached to Andreas. The complement included at various times: Vought-Sikorsky Chesepeakes, Hawker Sea Hurricanes and Fairey Fulmars. No. 772 Squadron aircraft were employed to provide simulated targets for the Royal Navy's No. 1 Radar Training School which was situated on Douglas Head. On October 27, 1944, the Sea Hurricane NF726 crashed on Douglas Head killing the pilot, 20 year old Sub Lieutenant Robert Shaw Paton.

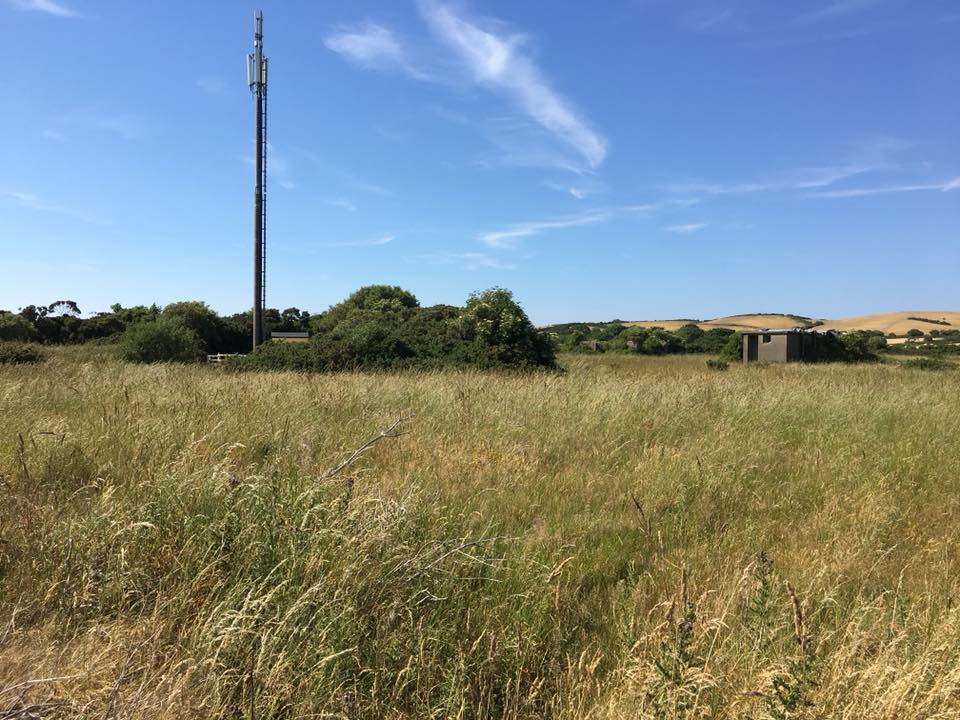
An E-pen at RAF Andreas (2018). These were situated predominately on the eastern and northern side of the airfield and were designed to afford shelter from attack for aircraft and ground crew. Two aircraft could be accommodated within the pen. Today, this one houses a mobile phone mast.

== Operations ==
At night the drone of bombers could be heard as they passed overhead on their way to Belfast. These were the nights when the fighters based at RAF Andreas and RAF Jurby were called into action. Airborne radar was still in its infancy, and there was little they could do except offer token resistance. Occasionally an enemy aircraft would be sighted and in the ensuing chase bombs would be jettisoned as the Heinkel or Dornier made a rapid escape. The air raid sirens of the Island sounded a total of 43 alerts – 32 of them in 1942. Many were of a short duration, but on the nights of 20 and 21 December 1941, there were two alerts each lasting five hours when Liverpool and Manchester were being heavily attacked.

The first enemy bomb to fall on the Isle of Man was on 18 September 1940, when high explosive bombs caused four large craters in the Dalby area – without damage or injury. On the nights of 7, 15, and 16 April 1941, enemy bombers were again over the Island. On the first occasion the Island was illuminated with flares and incendiary bombs landed near Port Soderick. On the 15th a high explosive bomb landed close to Cronk Ruagh Sanatorium near Ramsey. Shrapnel landed on the entrance steps and windows were blown out. The following night more H.E. bombs fell at Scarlett narrowly missing the Radar Station.

The following month considerable alarm was caused when bombs fell on the outskirts of Douglas. It was the night of 8/9 May, when clear conditions prevailed and when Dublin was mistakenly bombed.

After 93 Sqn had exchanged the sands of the Ayres for the sands of North Africa, the station grew quiet and much of it was reduced to care and maintenance. There was little to do for 9 Group now that the emergencies which had brought it into being had largely passed. Nevertheless, RAF Andreas remained officially part of 9 Group until August 1944, Wing Commander Raynor being responsible for the signing and despatch of the operational orders which signalled the disbanding of the Group, and many of the 900 airmen and 400 WAAFs were posted out whilst new plans were awaited for the Station.

One of the residents who did not leave was the detachment from 275 Squadron which would stay at the Station until the end of April, 1945.

During the spring of 1943, a new role was found for the excellent facilities at Andreas, and preparations began to set up No.11 Air Gunnery School of Training Command.

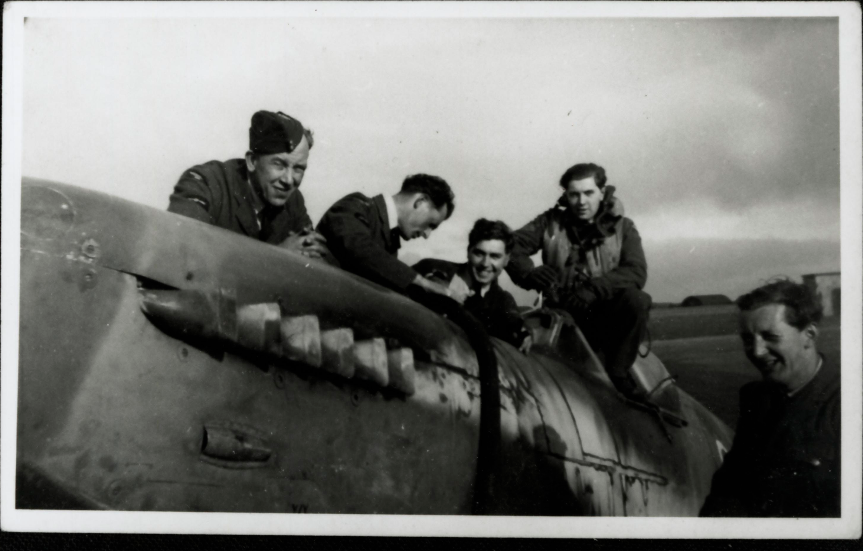
Flt. Lt. Harry Newton AFC pictured with a Spitfire MkXIV and Ground Crew at RAF Andreas. Harry Newton was a veteran of the Battle of Britain in which he flew Hurricanes with 111 Squadron at RAF Croydon and latterly RAF Kenley, during which he claimed several kills. Newton himself was shot down on August 18th, 1940, whilst in action over Botley Hill Farm, Tatsfield, an incident in which he received significant burns to his hands and face. Following treatment he rejoined his squadron. He then saw service with an Air Navigation School at RAF Staverton as a staff pilot. He moved to No. 5 Bombing & Gunnery School at RAF Jurby in April 1941, on similar duties. Commissioned from Flight Sergeant in August 1942, he later flew as a staff pilot at 11 Air Gunners School at Andreas.

== Training Command ==
=== No.11 Air Gunnery School ===
With the specialisation required in aircrew for the heavy bombers of Bomber Command, air gunners became a separate category. Each Avro Lancaster and Handley Page Halifax required two or three gunners in its crew, so thousands would be required to meet the demands of the growing strategic offensive and to replace losses.

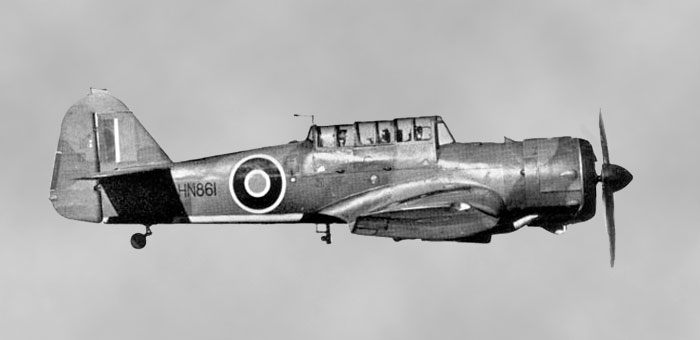
Martinet in RAF service

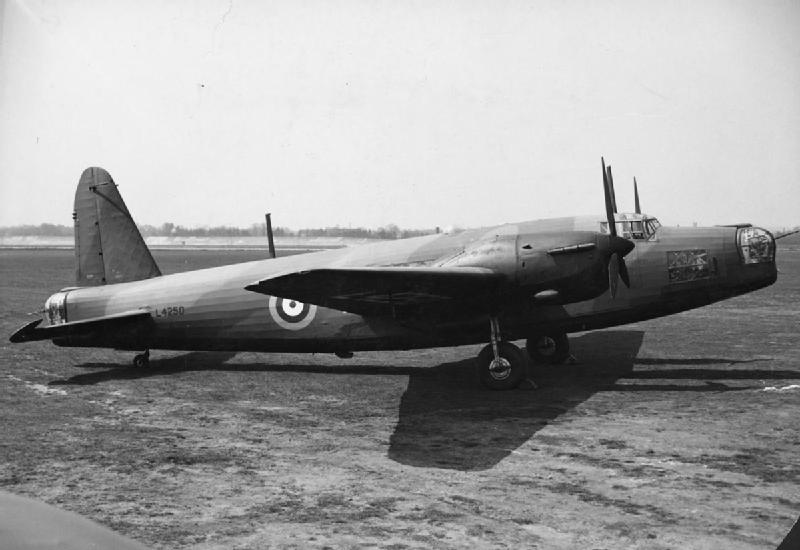
Vickers Wellington

RAF Andreas was to play an important role in the training programme, and thus began the busiest period in the life of the Station. The Station's new commanding officer was Group Captain Mackay, who would remain at Andreas for the rest of the war period, and the station completely changed in character from that of a fighter station to that of a training establishment.

Whilst at Andreas, the volunteer pupils selected for air gunners underwent an intensive ten-week course, before passing on to the operational training units of RAF Bomber Command. The course involved sighting; aircraft recognition; pyrotechnics; clay-pigeon and 25 yard range shoots; care and maintenance of .303 and .5 Browning machine guns and 20mm cannon; turret hydraulics, manipulation and operation, and the use of cine-camera guns. The training huts were equipped with the various types of turrets then in use, including Boulton Paul Types A and F, and Frazer Nash 121 which were installed in the Handley Page Halifax and Avro Lancaster respectively.

The first aircraft to arrive were 15 Avro Anson gunnery trainers. For more advanced experience, training was conducted on a succession of Vickers Wellingtons which were being withdrawn from the front-line squadrons of Bomber Command, and target towing duties were the responsibility of Bristol Mercury engined Miles Martinets. The aircraft were further complemented with Sptifires.

Firing took place in allotted zones over the sea on both sides of the Point of Ayre, care being taken not to interfere with the Jurby bombing ranges.

Despite the continual flying programme over the congested north of the Island, accidents involving Andreas aircraft proved to be very rare, and only one documented incident resulted in the loss of a life. During 1944, Andreas, because of the length of its main runway, became an emergency landing ground for the Atlantic ferry route and was occasionally used by American aircraft such as the Boeing B-17 Flying Fortress and the Consolidated B-24 Liberator. The ending of the war in Europe in May 1945, saw no let up in the routine at Andreas with the prospect of a long campaign in the Pacific War.

The detachment of Fleet Air Arm 772 Squadron, which had been responsible for operating the Chesapeakes, became 776B Squadron in May 1945 with the arrival of Boston IIIs, Corsairs and de Havilland Mosquitoes. The purpose of the Bostons was to train gunners from the naval air station at Ronaldsway, and Fairey Barracudas were added to the scene as they brought in telegraphists to have air gunnery added to their training. However, this only lasted for a short period, as 776 Squadron was disbanded on October 31, 1945, at RAF Woodvale following the defeat of Japan.

== Units ==
During the course of the operation of the station, the following units were at some time based at RAF Andreas:

10/41 to 03/42, 457 Sqn, with Supermarine Spitfire

03/42 to 06/42, 452 Sqn, with Supermarine Spitfire

06/42 to 09/42, 93 Sqn, with Supermarine Spitfire

11/41 to 04/44, 275 Sqn (detachment), with Supermarine Walrus and Blackburn Skua

04/42 to 05/45, 772 Sqn FAA (detachment), with Hawker Sea Hurricane, Fairey Fulmar and Vought-Sikorsky Chesapeake

05/45 to 10/45, 776B Sqn FAA, with Vought F4U Corsairs and de Havilland Mosquitoes

05/43 to 09/46, No. 11 Air Gunnery School

01/44 to 02/44, No. 776 Sqn FAA (detachment)

== Post-war and closure ==
By the ending of hostilities in 1945 over 3,000 air gunners had successfully completed the air gunnery course at RAF Andreas.

In July 1946, the Douglas High School Flight of 506 Squadron Air Training Corps, spent a week's camp at Andreas. The squadron, together with 440, had been set up in the early years of the war to encourage the interest of schoolboys in the Royal Air Force, many going on to train as aircrew. The cadets enjoyed daily flights in some of the Wellingtons at the station, taking advantage of what was now considerably quieter airspace over the north of the island, as well as south west Scotland and Cumberland.

=== At Home Day ===
As was common amongst RAF stations, Andreas staged an 'At Home Day' on Thursday May 9, 1946. A cricket match was held on the sports field and in addition a speed dash was conducted by Spitfires and Mosquitoes.

=== Battle of Britain Day ===
The one and only opportunity the general public had of visiting Royal Air Force Andreas was on Battle of Britain Day, September 1946. It had already been announced that the station would close and that the Gunnery School would transfer to nearby Jurby. The Commanding Officer Group Captain Mackay and the rest of the station personnel made every effort to show what the work of the station involved.

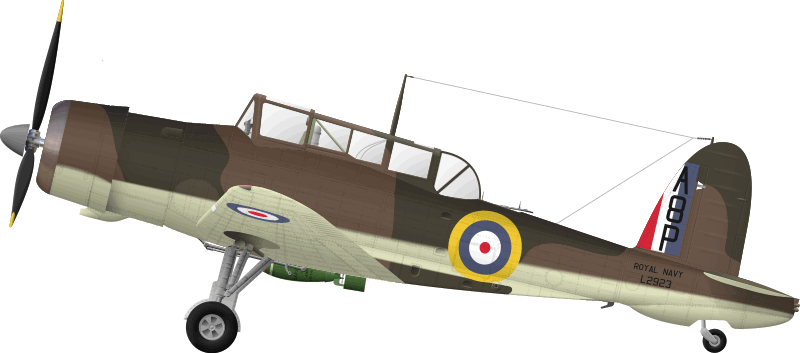
The Blackburn Skua was operated by No. 275 Air Sea Rescue Squadron, which had a detachment based at RAF Andreas from October 1941.

On show were the link trainer, parachute packing by the WAAFs and parachute dinghies and equipment used by the Andreas Rescue Station, which had so often been called upon in emergencies.

The following week the transfer of stores to RAF Jurby was completed, and the gates of Royal Air Force Andreas were finally closed.

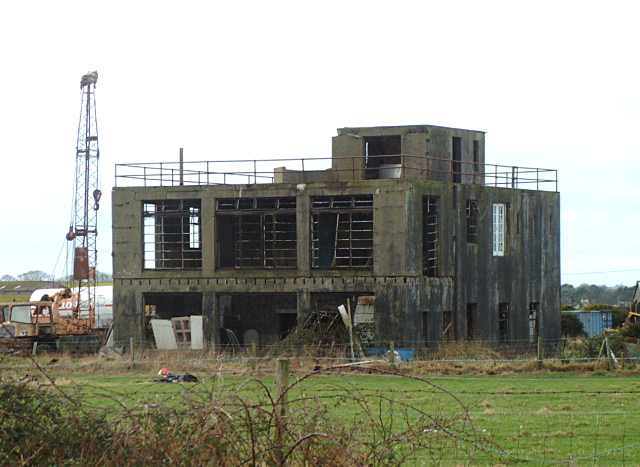
The Watch Office around 2012.

== Subsequent use ==
=== Civil aerodrome ===
Post-war the siting of a civilian aerodrome was a foremost consideration for the government of the Isle of Man, with Andreas at the time being generally regarded as the best aerodrome on the Island. Situated on the northern plain, it was unaffected by advection fog, as Ronaldsway Airport often is, particularly in summer, and the runways were considered superior to Ronaldsway. But Andreas was further from the capital, Douglas, than Ronaldsway was: 50 minutes drive compared to just 20 minutes. That was the main reason for the decision to continue to develop Ronaldsway Airport, and just as had been the case a decade earlier with Hall Caine Airport, the location of Andreas worked against it.

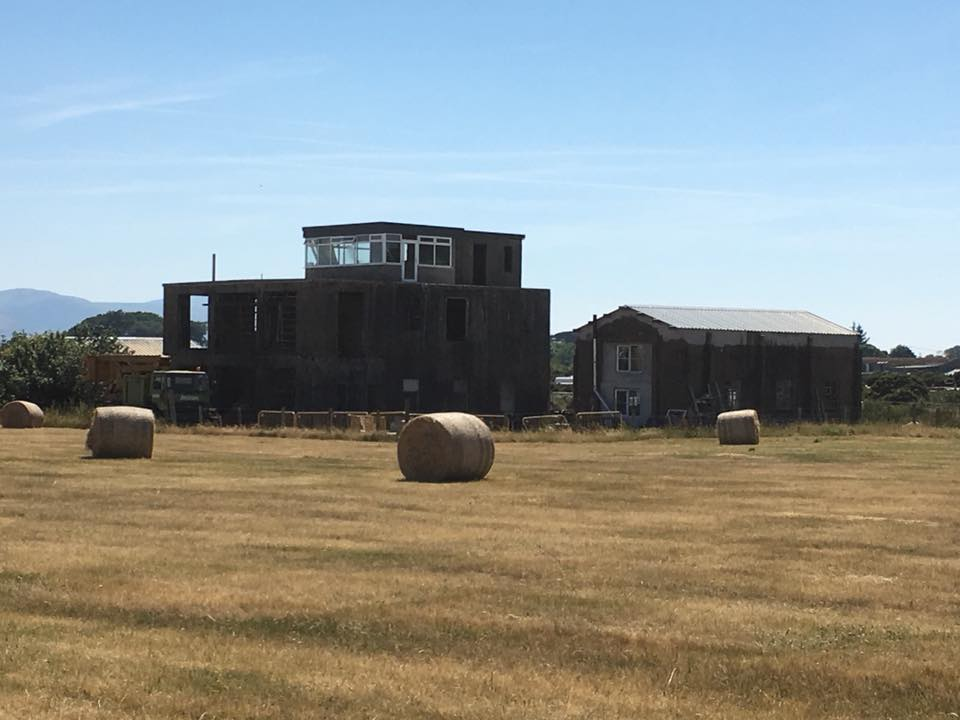
The Watch Office undergoing restoration, June 2018.

=== Missile base ===
Following the 1957 Defence White Paper a further proposal for the use of Andreas airfield was to sell it back to the government of the United Kingdom in order for it to be developed into a Bristol Bloodhound Surface to Air Missile site for the RAF. The proposal was not proceeded with.

=== Infrastructure purchase ===
After the station closed, the Isle of Man Government, through the Local Government Board, took steps to acquire three of the communal sites (the WAAF quarters, the hospital and sick quarters and a site in the centre of Andreas village) to convert them into family accommodation. This was badly needed to rehouse families living in condemned properties in Ramsey and to relieve the general housing shortage on the island as a consequence of the war. Every effort was made to convert the brick-built huts into acceptable two- and three-bedroom homes with electrically heated living rooms and kitchens. Each had a toilet installed, but bathrooms had to be shared. During 1947, a total of 81 families were accommodated as a temporary measure pending the construction of new housing estates. It was to be several years before such new housing was ready, and upon their completion, this temporary housing, by now badly affected by damp, was demolished. One structure to survive was the old gymnasium which still stands, and continues to provide the village of Andreas with a very useful parish hall.

Meanwhile, negotiations between the Manx Government and the Air Ministry were proceeding as to the future of the airfield. Tynwald, the Isle of Man's Parliament, accepted an offer to purchase the whole of the airfield for the price originally paid in compensation to the land owners: £23,750 in all. No charge was made for the buildings, the Air Ministry agreeing to this as a gesture of appreciation to the government and people of the Isle of Man for their co-operation during the early years of the war.

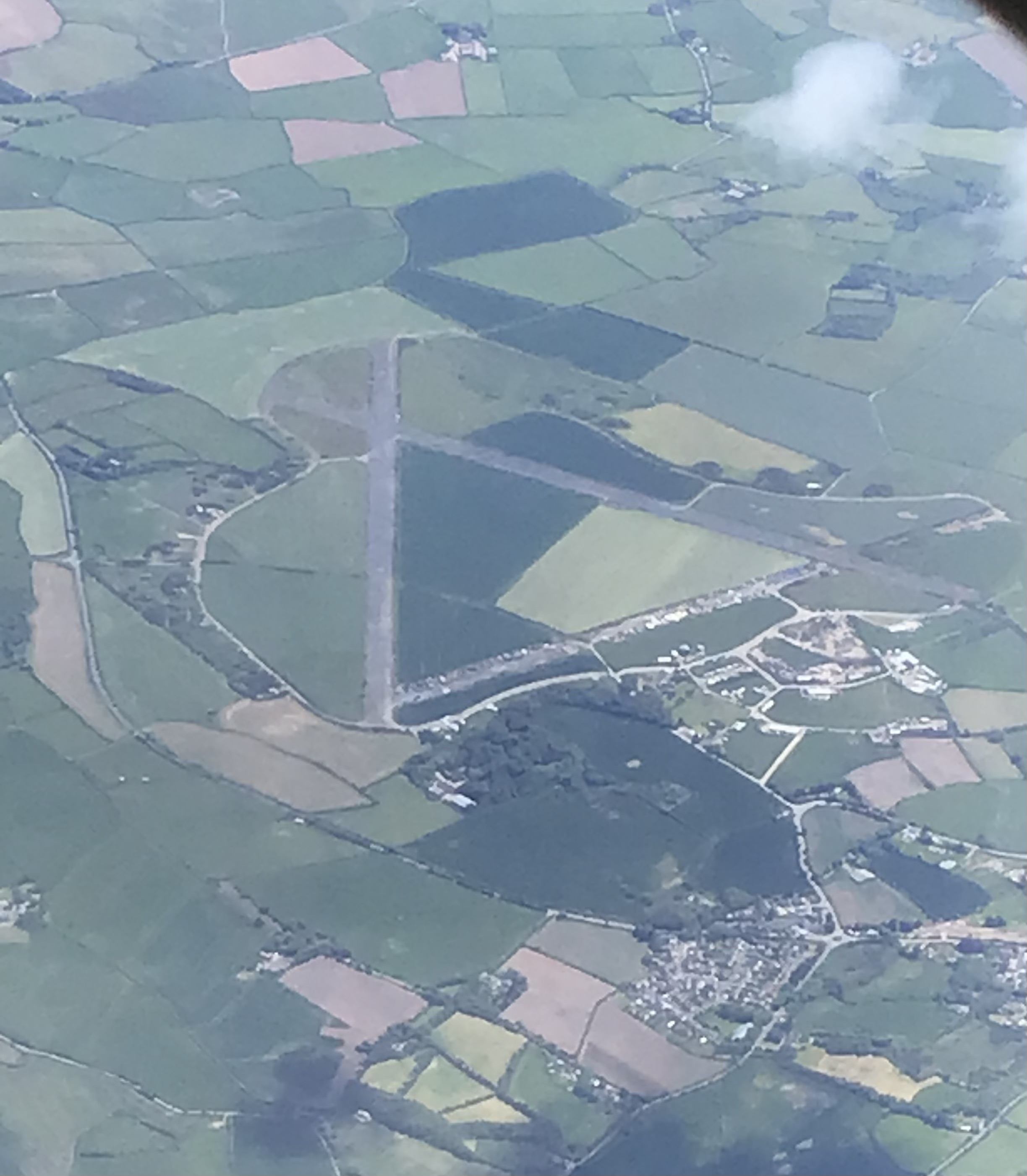
Aerial image of Andreas Airfield (May 2022).

The airfield's runways were soon put to good use by the newly formed Andreas Racing Association for motorcycle racing. The Association's emblem is the Three Legs of Man, set against the "A" layout of the airfield's runways.

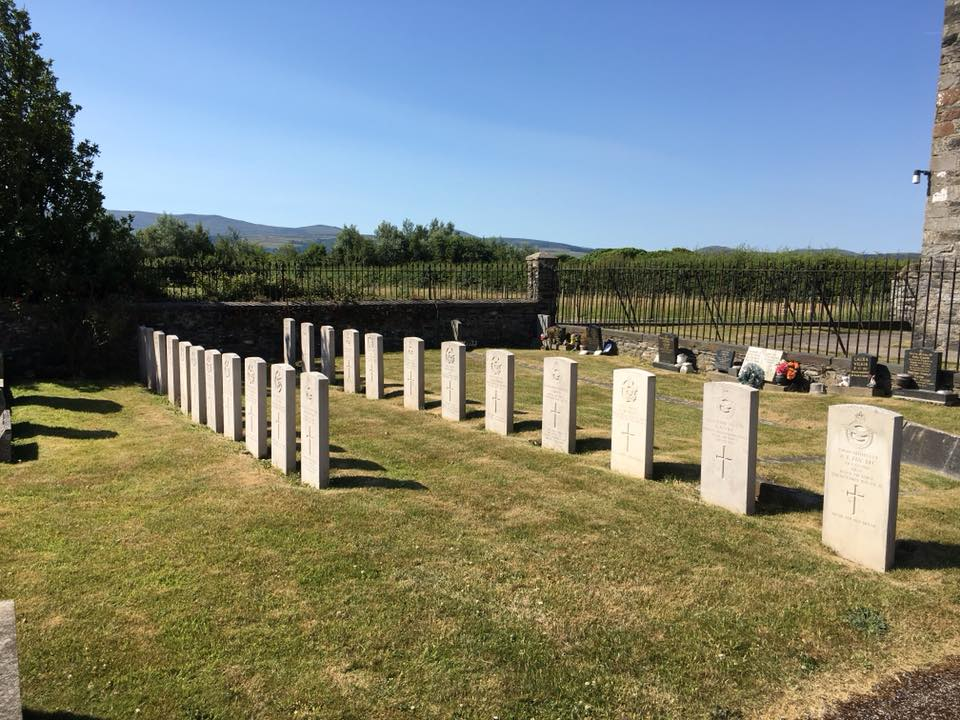
Military graves at St Andrews Church, Andreas

The airfield was used on Saturday 25 June 1949, when two Sivewright Airways aircraft diverted there as they were unable to land at Ronaldsway due to advection fog. The 28 passengers were taken to Douglas by motor coach.

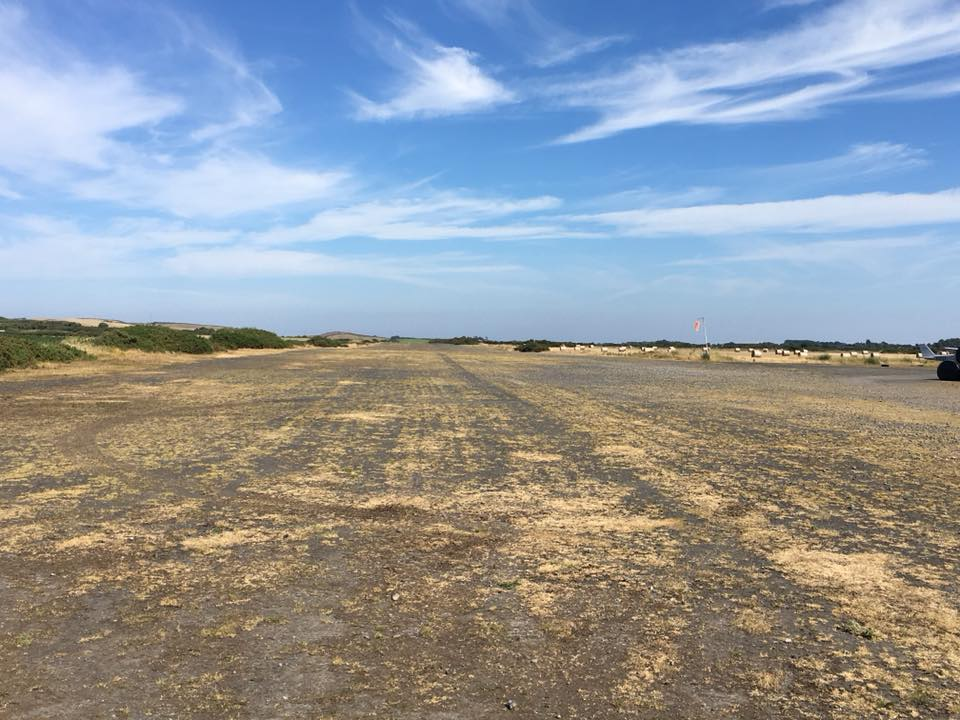
The view looking down Rwy 29 RAF Andreas (June 2018)

=== Current use ===
After a short time in the ownership of the Manx Government, the airfield was put up for sale as a complete entity, and was purchased by a Mr Morrey for the sum of £33,000. The facility is still owned by the Morrey family, and many of its buildings still exist, being mostly used for storage. The local gliding club still uses the airfield, together with a small number of privately owned light aircraft with the RAF Station now known as Andreas Airfield.

To this day, within easy view of the airfield, is the (still) stunted tower of the parish church of St. Andrew (in Manx Gaelic, Andrew translates to Andreas), a permanent legacy of Royal Air Force Andreas, and below which lie twenty-three military graves.

== Accidents ==
Although not always involving aircraft based at the Isle of Man's air stations, there were some 200 air accidents on the Isle of Man during the course of the Second World War. The actual number of accidents is open to conjecture as those only involving the loss of life are recorded. For every fatal crash, it is estimated that at least two others occurred many of which would include serious injury, while in others, the pilot and crew would escape unscathed.

=== Spitfire P7917 ===
Sergeant R.T. Brewin was injured in an incident which involved Spitfire P7917 belonging to No. 457 Sqn on November 5, 1941.

=== Spitfire P8380 ===
On 1 December 1941 Spitfire MkII P8380, piloted by Flt Sgt Gifford was returning to Andreas after an operational sortie. Crossing the end of the runway at the time was one of the builder's foremen driving a lorry. One of the Spitfire's wheels hit the cab of the lorry, causing severe injuries to its occupant, who was killed instantly.

=== Spitfire P7529 ===
During operations on 3 December 1941, Spitfire P7529 piloted by Pilot Officer Edwards was involved in an incident whilst landing at Andreas. The aircraft's starboard wheel struck an obstacle whilst landing causing it to overturn. Whilst the pilot was uninjured, the aircraft was badly damaged, resulting in the pilot's log book being endorsed with red ink.

=== Spitfire P7502 ===
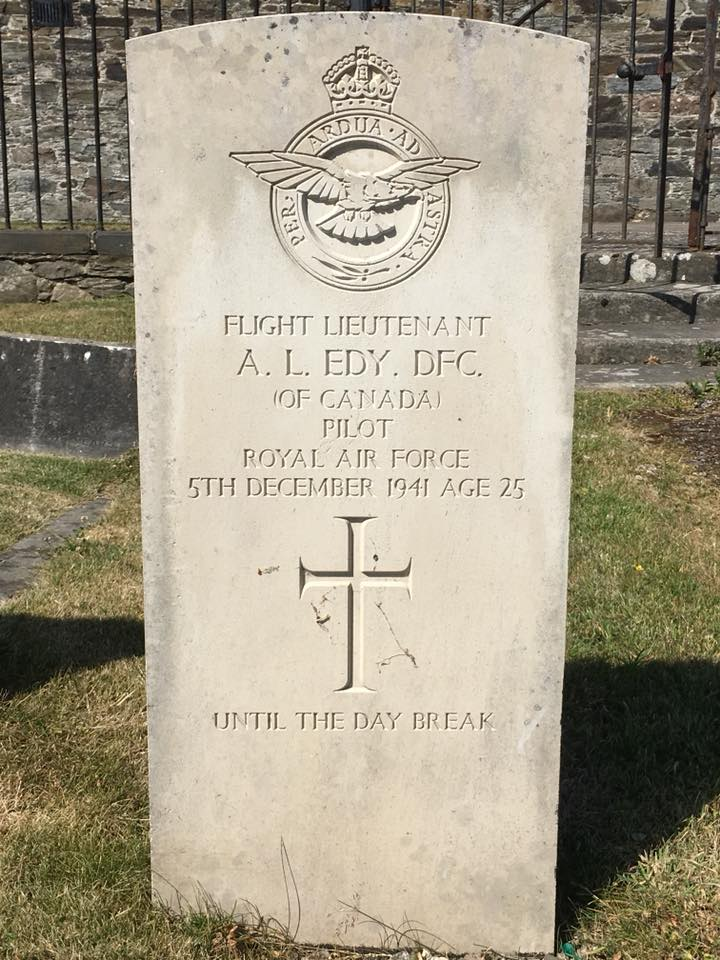
Flt Lt Edy

The third accident within the same week at the beginning of December 1941, was of Spitfire P7502, piloted by Flt Lt Allen Edy DFC, commander of B Flight.

Flt Lt Edy had departed Andreas at 15:25, however 15 minutes later his aircraft crashed at Vondy's Farm, 3 miles (4.8 km) from the airfield. Flt Lt Edy had managed to bale out, however he might well have been struck by part of the aircraft, causing him to become stunned and thereby lose his life.

- The engine of P7502 was recovered circa 1984 and is now on display at the Manx Aviation and Military Museum.

=== Spitfire P7905 ===
Sergeant R.N.S. Stevens suffered an injury in an incident involving Spitfire MKIIa of No. 457 Squadron on December 31, 1941. The aircraft swung on landing, which resulted in the undercarriage digging in causing the aircraft to become inverted

=== Spitfire BL351 ===
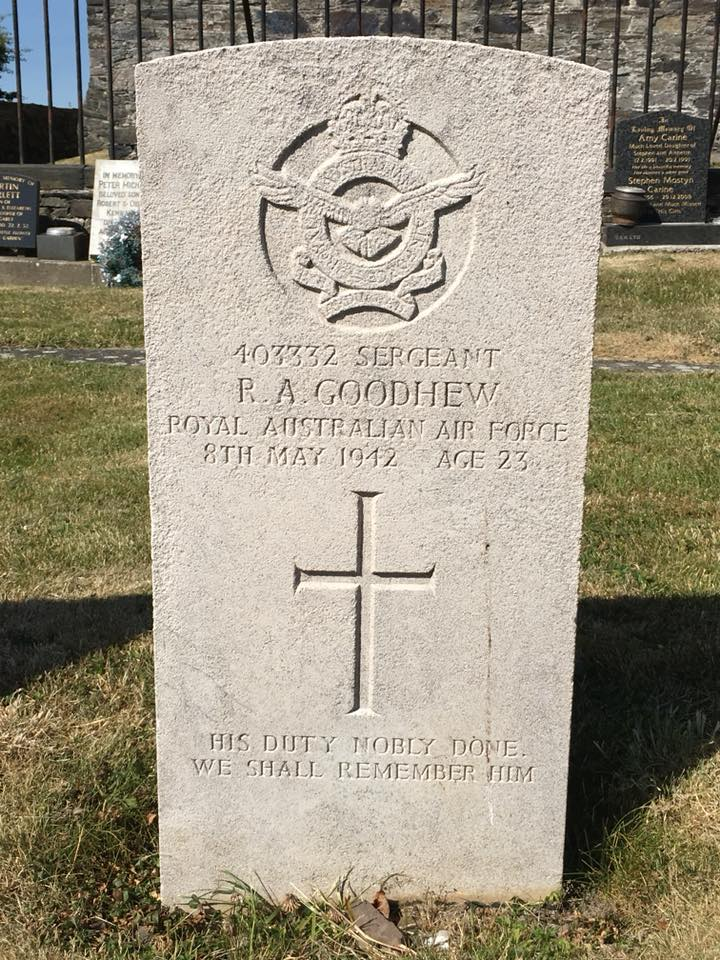
Sgt Pilot R. Goodhew

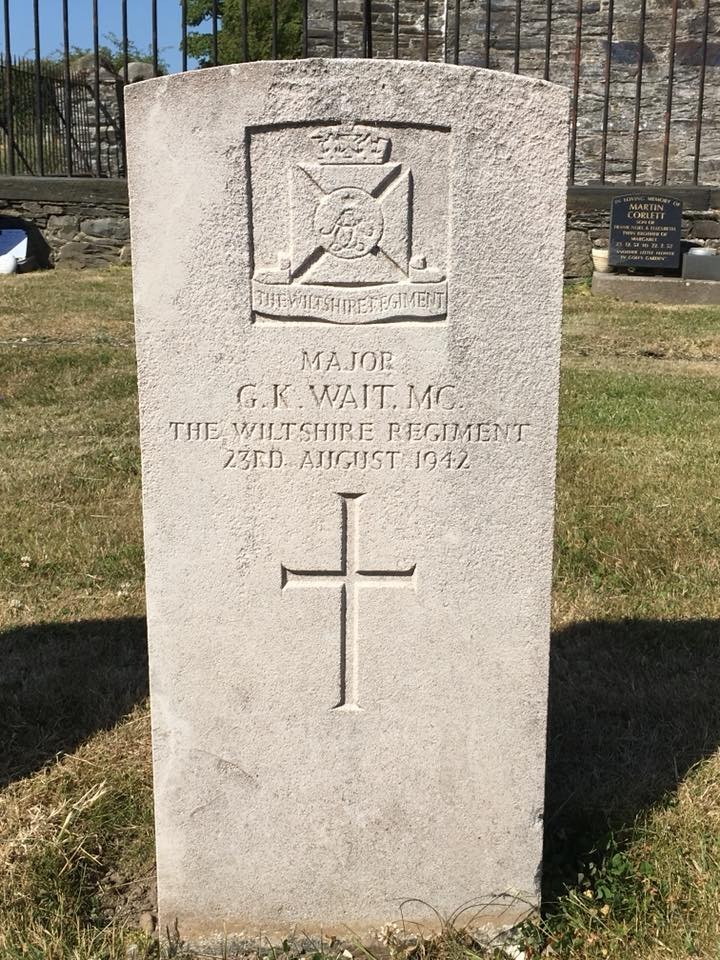
Major Waite

On 8 May 1942, two of No. 452 Squadron's Spitfires were in collision over Andreas resulting in the death of Sergeant Pilot Reginald Goodhew. Sgt Goodhew, was flying Spitfire IIa (BL351) and was involved in practicing camera quarter attacks with another Spitfire (AB244), piloted by Pilot Officer William Ford. The two aircraft collided head on, Pilot Officer Ford's aircraft crashed between the runways at Andreas, whilst Pilot Sergeant Goodhew's came down at Farrant Ford Farm. Pilot Officer Ford managed to bale out and survived. Sergeant Pilot Goodhew is buried in Andreas.

=== Whitley BD417 ===
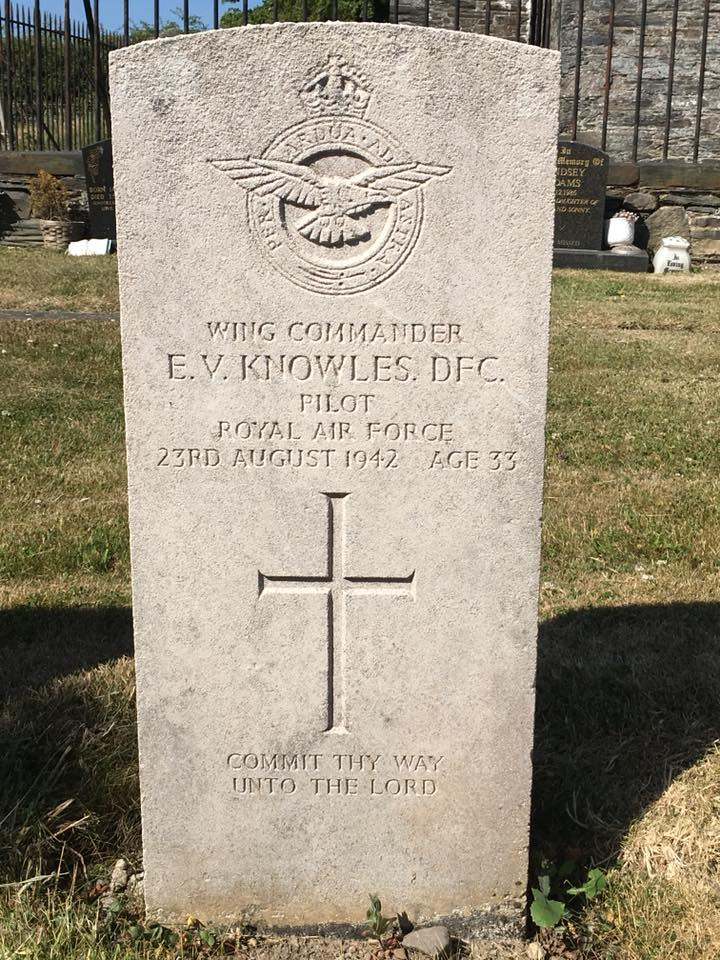
Wing Commander Teddy Knowles DFC

On 23 August 1942, the most memorable and tragic incident of the life of RAF Andreas occurred. It was the day the station lost its commanding officer, Wing Commander Edward Knowles.

Saturday night had seen the usual social activity in the Moosejaw Bar of the Officer's Mess, attended by the Wing Commander. Aged 33 and a bomber pilot, he was regarded as a "character" and was reputed to be a lively presence at social gatherings, with his piano playing being put to good use.

The morning after, Wing Commander Knowles was back in the mess for what was described as a "convivial luncheon" with friends including Major Wait. Relaxing after luncheon, news was received that an Armstrong-Whitworth Whitley had landed on the airfield, an unusual event which immediately aroused the interest of the C.O., who took his friends out onto the airfield to inspect the Whitley, which had called in to refuel before continuing on to a Coastal Command station in Scotland. The Whitley MkV, BD417 belonged to 296 Squadron.

There was little else to do that summer's afternoon, and the Wing Commander decided to take the bomber up for a short flight.

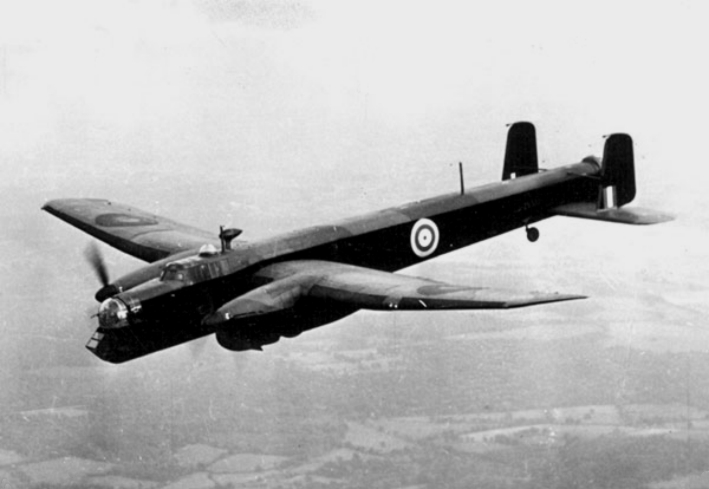
Armstrong-Whitworth Whitley.

Objections from the Whitley pilot were overruled and the duty pilot of the day, Flying Officer A. B. Paton, was prevailed upon to join the C.O., his two friends, and Thelma Knowles, Wing Commander Knowles' wife. Four corporals from the nearby crash section found themselves joining the party and acting as ballast in the back of the aircraft. With engines started, the C.O. followed the perimeter track to the south end of the northeasterly facing runway.

The Whitley slowly gathered speed but the end of the runway was reached before it became airborne. It was then seen to be in trouble as it tried to gain height in order to clear the Bride Hills looming ahead. This it failed to do, and it crashed heavily into a field of West Kimmeragh, bursting into flames, and sending up a pall of smoke which could be seen for miles around.

The rescue services went into immediate action but nothing could be done to save the four in the nose section of the aircraft; they all had been killed instantly.

The rear section of the fuselage broke open and the four corporals were seen staggering around dazed with shock. They were taken by ambulance to the station hospital, but one was transferred to the Military Hospital which had been established at the Majestic Hotel in Onchan. Sadly though, Corporal Henderson never recovered from his severe head wounds.

An Air Ministry inquiry was ordered. The five who perished in the disaster on that Sunday afternoon lie buried together in Andreas Churchyard.

== Gallery ==
RAF Andreas
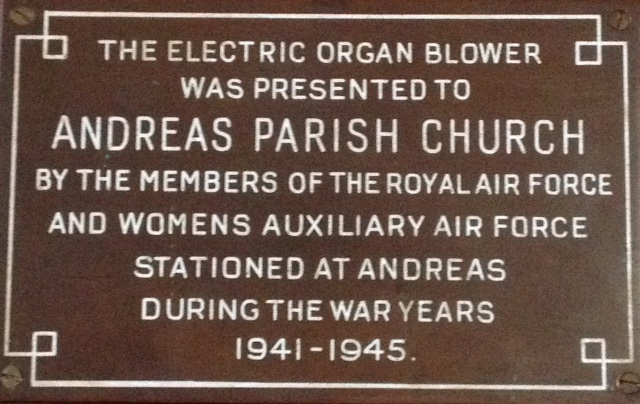
Plaque commemorating the donation of the organ blower to St Andrew's Church, Andreas.

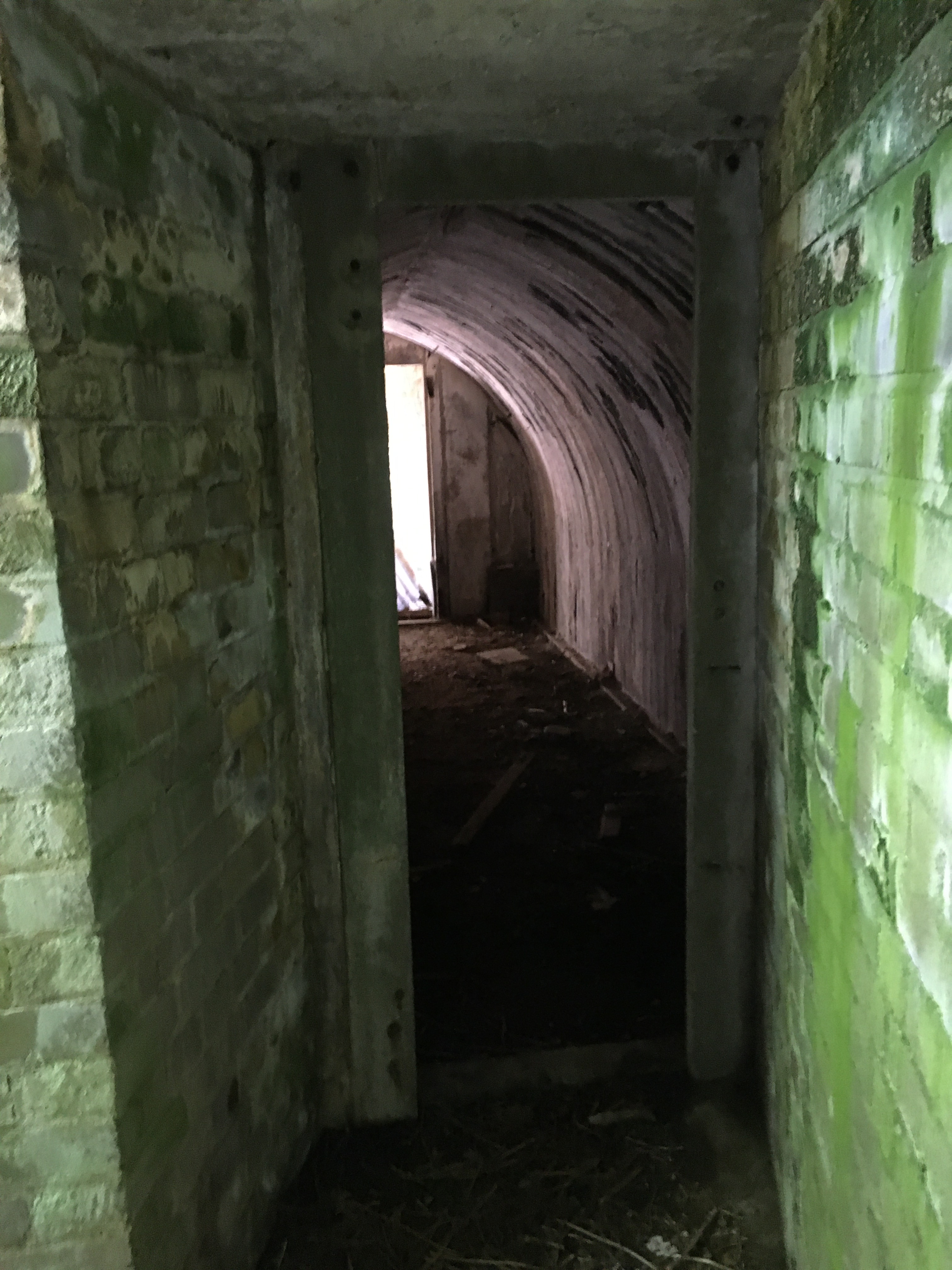
Inside the protective shelter of an E Pen at RAF Andreas (May, 2021).

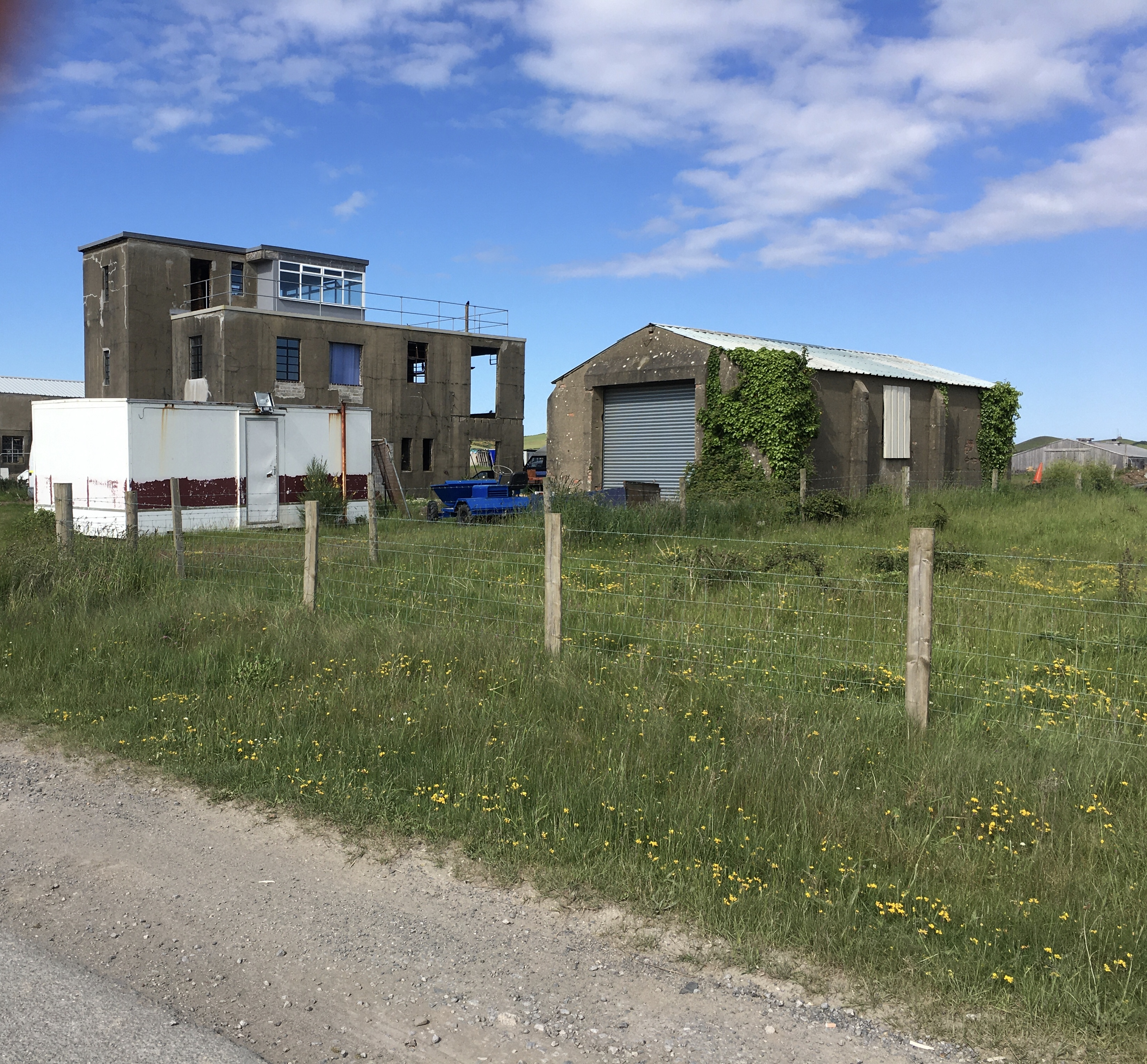
Station Control Tower and Advanced Ambulance Station.

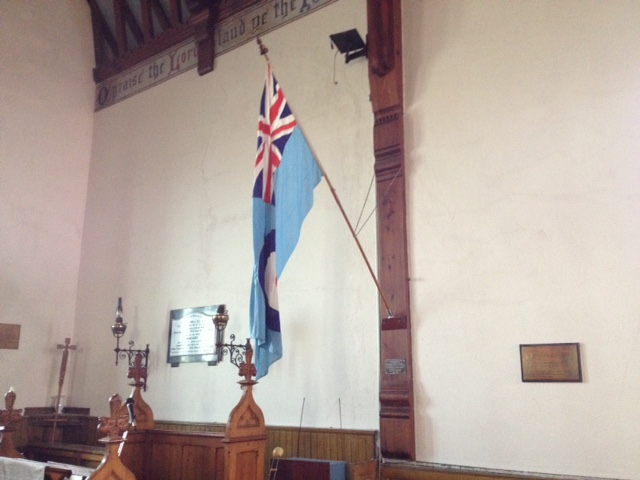
RAF Ensign in St Andrew's Church, Andreas.

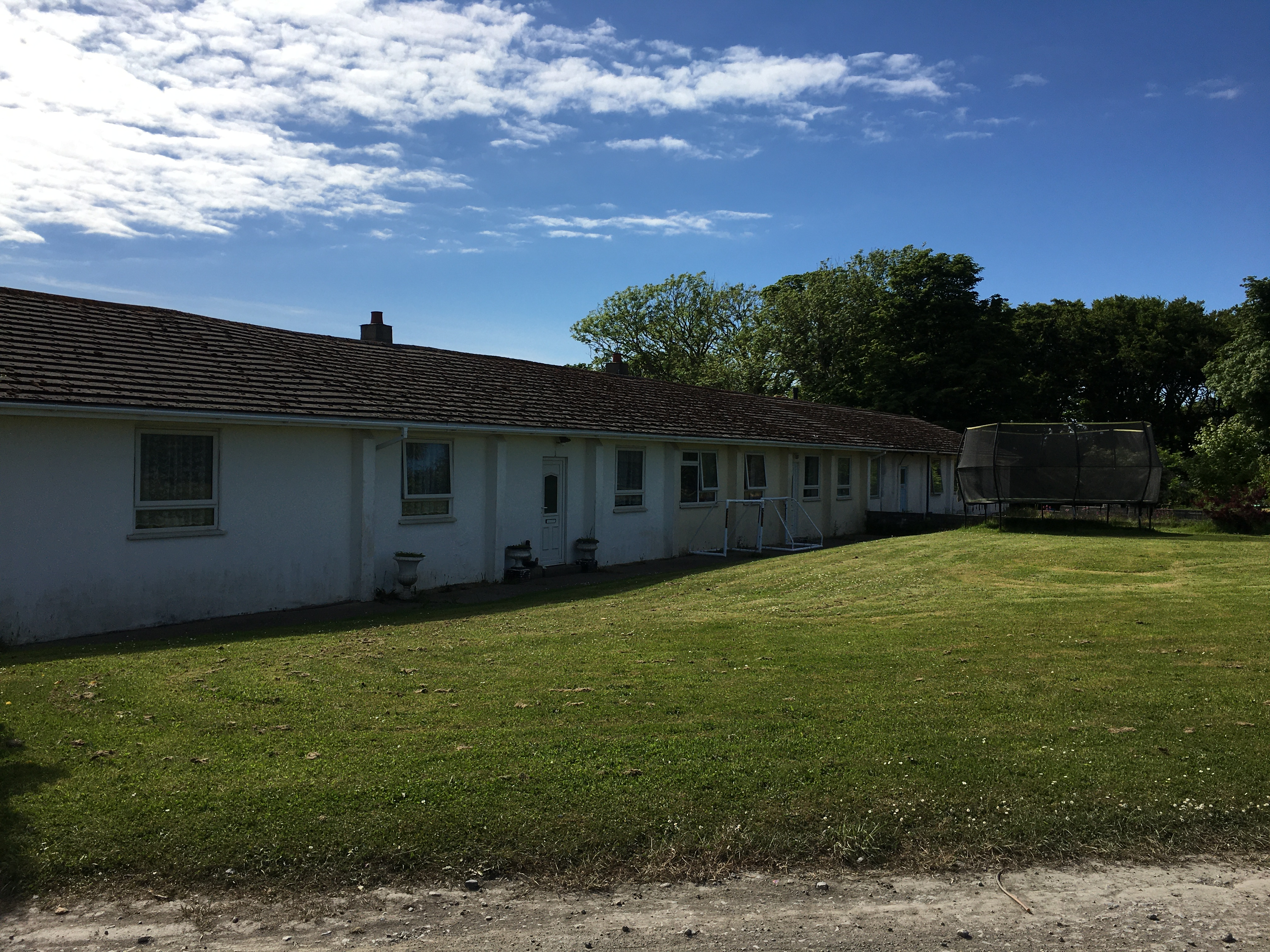
The Former Ground Defence Station

== See also ==
- List of former Royal Air Force stations
- RAF Jurby
- RAF Jurby Head, an offshore bombing range
- 54 Air-Sea Rescue Marine Craft Unit RAF
- HMS Valkyrie
- HMS St George
- HMS Urley
- Scarlett Radar Station
