= Leece Museum =

Local museum in Peel, Isle of Man

Coordinates: 54.2240°N 4.6974°W

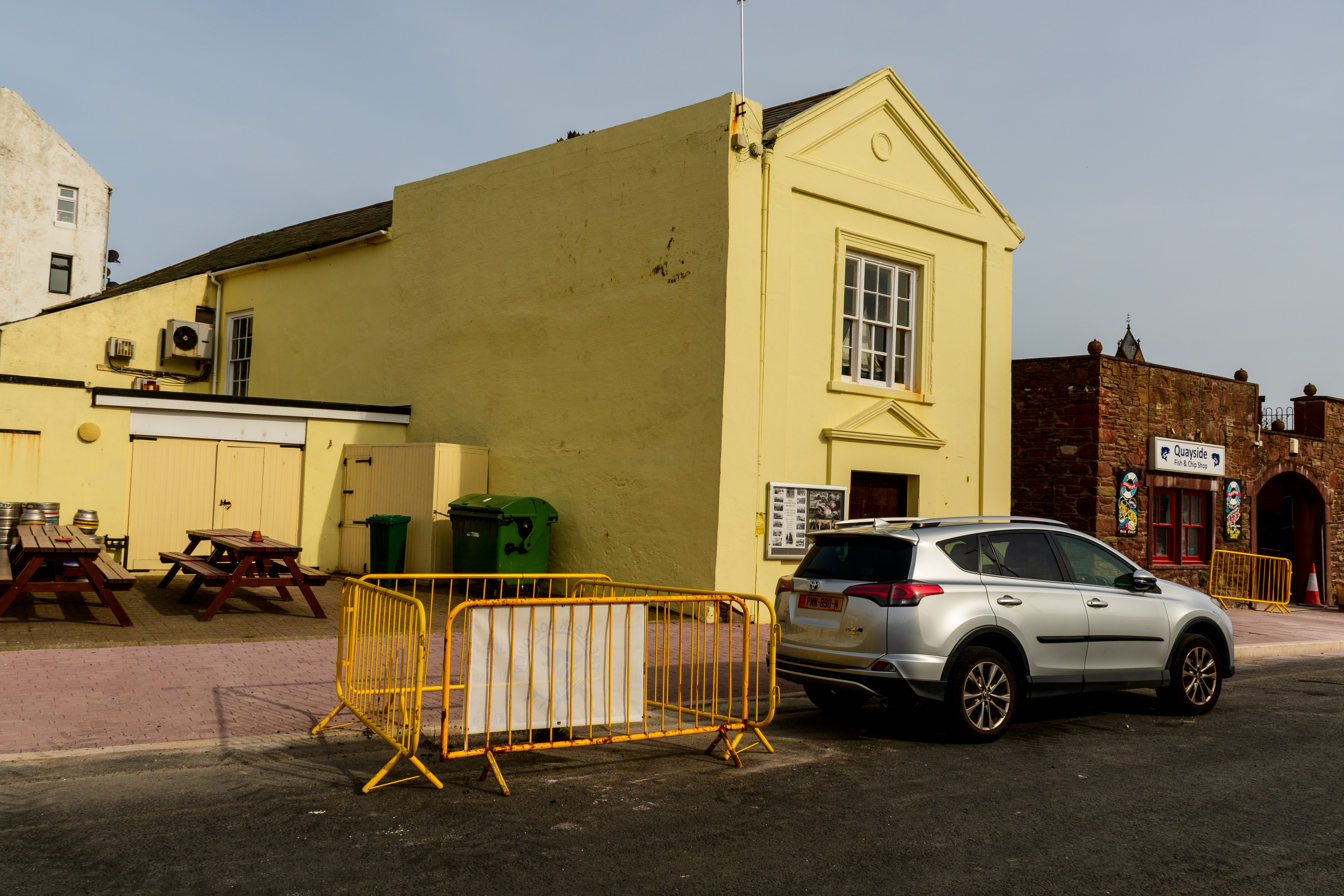
The Leece Museum

The Leece Museum is a museum in Peel, Isle of Man established in 1984. It is dedicated to the local history of Peel. The museum is housed in the Old Courthouse, a building dating back to the early 1700s that originally served as the town's courthouse and jail until the late 19th century.

== Collections ==
Established in 1984 by Eddie Leece, a retired headmaster, and Frank Quayle, a former town commissioner, the museum aims to preserve and showcase the rich history of Peel, particularly its maritime and social heritage. Quayle served as its curator for 15 years after its opening.

The ground floor hosts a collection of motorcycles—including several that have competed in the Isle of Man TT and the Manx Grand Prix. This has been a permanent exhibition since 2015. These motorcycles are displayed in the “Black Hole,” a former prison cell where inmates were held throughout the 19th century, including during the Potato Riots of the 1820s.

The museum features also a variety of exhibits that highlight Peel's significance in maritime history, with the first floor of the museum exploring Peel's long-standing fishing industry. Exhibits include records of local fishing boats and their crews, showcasing rare documents such as crew lists, catch records, and other artefacts from Peel's seafaring past. The museum also delves into boatbuilding and wartime internment camps, offering a broader understanding of the local history, including its role during World War II.

In addition to its exhibitions, the Leece Museum provides a small research facility where visitors can access historical archives and records to further explore Peel's history. The museum is run by volunteers and relies on donations to fund its operations.
