= Isle of Man Airport =

Airport on the Isle of Man

Isle of Man International Airport Purt Aer Vannin

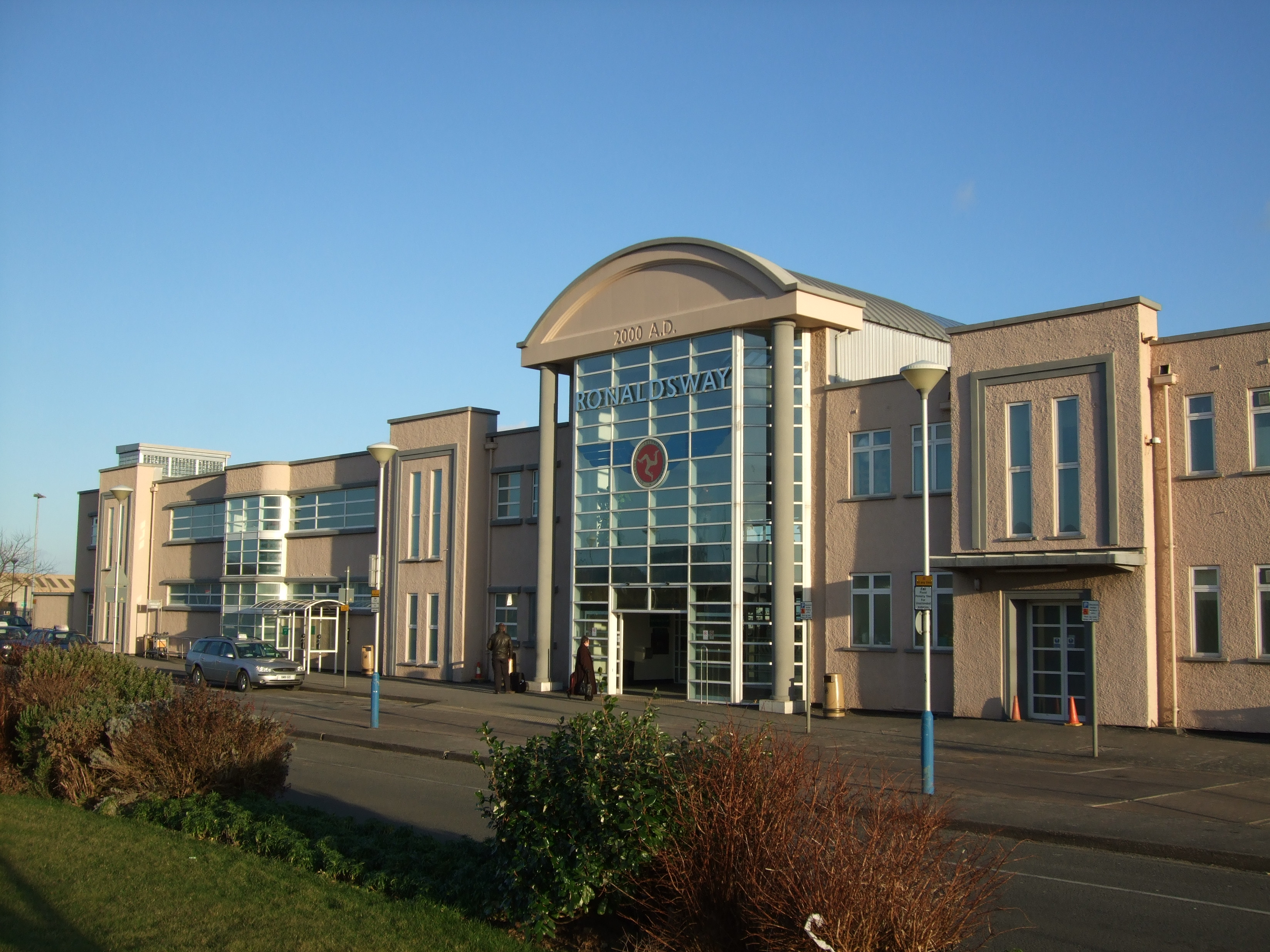
- IATA: IOM; ICAO: EGNS

Summary
- Airport type: Public
- Operator: Department of Infrastructure
- Serves: Isle of Man
- Location: Ronaldsway, Malew, Isle of Man
- Focus city for: Loganair
- Elevation AMSL: 52 ft (16 m)
- Coordinates: 54°5′0″N 4°37′24″W
- Website: airport.im

Map
- Location on the Isle of Man Location between Ireland and Britain

Runways
Direction	Length		Surface
Direction	m	ft	Surface
08/26	2,110	6,923	Asphalt/Concrete
03/21	1,255	4,117	Asphalt

Statistics (2024)
- Passengers: 652,274
- Passenger change 23–24: ▲0.45%
- Aircraft movements: 15,512
- Movements change 23–24: ▼1.2%
- Source: Statistics from the Department of Infrastructure (Isle of Man)

Isle of Man Airport (Manx: Purt Aer Vannin, also known as Ronaldsway Airport) (IATA: IOM, ICAO: EGNS) is the main civilian airport on the Isle of Man. It is located in the south of the island at Ronaldsway near Castletown, 6 nautical miles (11 km; 6.9 mi) southwest of Douglas, the island's capital. Along with the Isle of Man Sea Terminal, it is one of the two main gateways to the island. The airport has scheduled services to the United Kingdom and Ireland.

== History ==
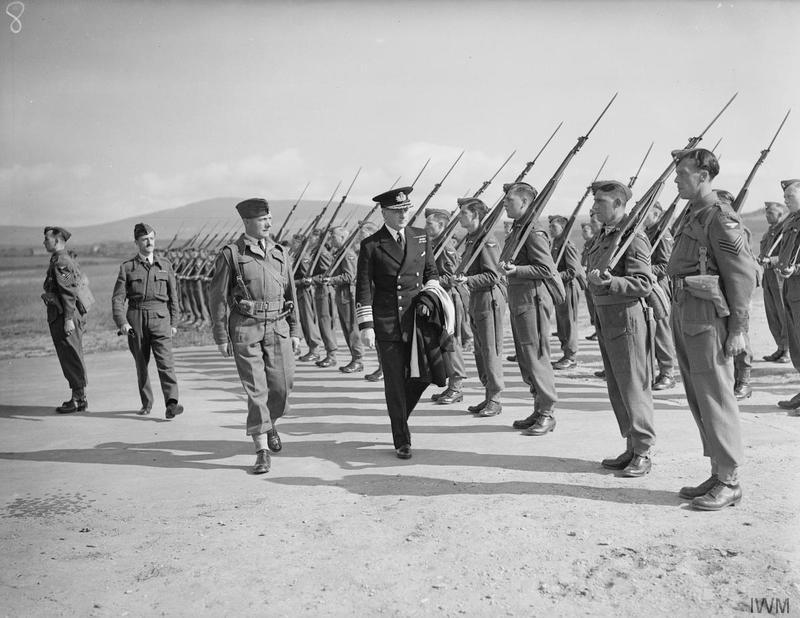
Admiral Sir Percy Noble inspects RAF Regiment personnel during a visit to RAF Ronaldsway, 11 June 1942.

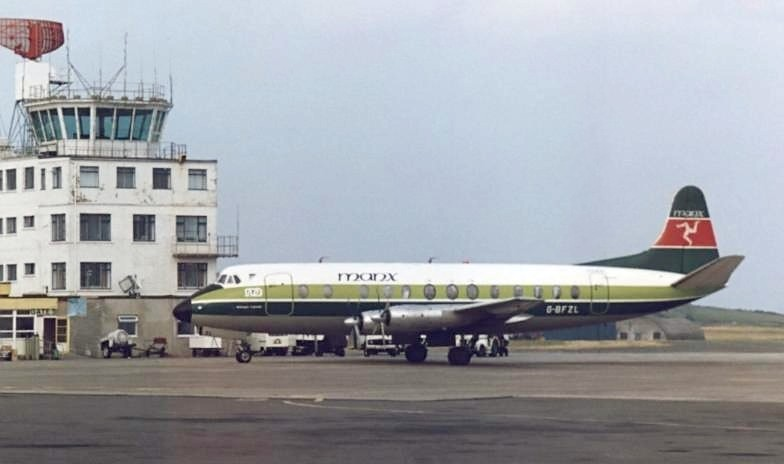
Manx Airlines Vickers Viscount in front of the airport control tower in 1988

=== Early years ===
Ronaldsway was first used as an airfield in 1928 with passenger services to the UK starting in 1933, operated by Blackpool and West Coast Air Services (later West Coast Air Services). Further services were established by Aer Lingus and Railway Air Services (RAS) from 1934. From 1937 RAS operations from Ronaldsway to the UK were transferred to Isle of Man Air Services. In a 1936 expansion of the Ronaldsway Airport, workers discovered a mass grave believed to hold the remains of soldiers who died during the Battle of Ronaldsway in 1275.

=== Second World War ===
==== RAF Ronaldsway ====
The airfield came under Royal Air Force control at the outbreak of the Second World War. Known as RAF Ronaldsway, it was one of the few airfields that continued operating civilian flights throughout the wartime period.

The airfield was used by No. 1 GDGS (Ground Defence and Gunnery School) operating Westland Wallace aircraft, the drogues from these aircraft being fired on from gun emplacements on St Michael's Isle (Fort Island) and Santon Head. An expansion of the airport during the War led to the discovery of the archaeological remains of a Neolithic settlement belonging to what is now called the Ronaldsway culture, in honour of this site.

RAF operations continued until 1943 when the airfield was handed over to the Admiralty for further development as a Fleet Air Arm training station.

==== HMS Urley ====
Now a naval air station, Royal Naval Air Station Ronaldsway (RNAS Ronaldsway), the airport was taken out of commission in 1943 for almost twelve months of extensive development undertaken by John Laing & Son. By the summer of 1944 the airfield had evolved from a grass landing area with a few hangars to a four runway airfield with the infrastructure to house and operate three training squadrons operating with Fairey Barracuda torpedo bombers.

Commissioned as HMS Urley (Manx for Eagle) by the Royal Navy on 21 June 1944, with accounts handled by HMS Valkyrie, flying recommenced on 15 July 1944. The airfield's main role was that of a torpedo working-up station. No. 1 OTU consisted of 710, 713 and 747 Naval Air Squadrons and these operated until the cessation of hostilities in 1945. The base was 'paid off' on 14 January 1946, and transferred to Care and Maintenance under HMS Blackcap. The nominal depot ship from 21 June 1944 was a 32' cutter named XXII, which itself was constructed in 1937.

==== Post-war ====
The airport reverted to solely civilian flying almost immediately after the war, but the airfield remained in Admiralty possession until sold to the Isle of Man Government in 1948 for £200,000 (equivalent to £6,287,352 in 2025), far short of the £1 million (equivalent to £39,422,712 in 2025) that the UK Government had spent on constructing the airport buildings and runways, plus the £105,000 (equivalent to £4,139,385 in 2025) that was paid by the Admiralty in 1943 to purchase the site.

Several Manx-based airlines were formed in the early postwar years to operate scheduled and charter services to the UK mainland.

=== Development since the 2000s ===
A project by Ellis Brown Architects began in November 1998 to extend the airport and improve the facilities available to passengers. In March 2000 the new extension was opened, providing a new landside catering outlet, arrivals area, baggage hall, and departure lounge. The existing part of the airport was refurbished during this time to provide improved check-in facilities and offices, linked to the extension with a new airport entrance. During the extension and renovation period, the iconic Three Legs of Man sculpture adorning the airport's façade was also refurbished. In March 2006 funding for a further extension was granted by Tynwald to increase the number of departure gates, with work due for completion in summer 2007.

In April 2008 Tynwald granted a major runway extension and resurfacing project at the airport. The runway was extended by 245 m (804 ft) out into the Irish Sea by the construction of a rock-armoured promontory. The development also included resurfacing of the runway and was completed in 2011. It has emerged that the actual runway take-off length was underestimated by 160 metres in the £1.5 million feasibility study. Whilst the study originally looked into the aviation marketing implication of runway length, airport management denied that the extension was for the use of heavier aircraft, stating that the resurfacing and extension were to comply with international safety standards.

There was a significant overspend on the project due to poor foreign exchange management of the Euro-denominated components of the costs. It is thought that the Manx Treasury Minister may have been referring to the expense of the runway and the additional £6,515,000 control tower project when he stated in his 2009 Budget speech that the Isle of Man could no longer afford "Rolls-Royce" projects. Following the completion of the runway extension project the largest aircraft that can operate fully at Ronaldsway is the Boeing 757.

In September 2019, Flybe announced it would shut down its base operations at the airport by Spring 2020.

== Terminal ==
The Isle of Man airport has one terminal with 5 gates, all of which are hardstands. Airside, there is a lounge operated by Menzies Aviation that can be accessed by passengers for a fee. There is also a duty-free, a bar and a Costa Coffee café.

== Airlines and destinations ==
The following airlines operate regular scheduled flights to and from the Isle of Man:

Airlines	Destinations
airBaltic	Seasonal charter: Tenerife–South
Aer Lingus	Dublin
British Airways	Seasonal charter: Faro, Ibiza, Málaga, Palma de Mallorca
easyJet	Liverpool, London–Gatwick, Manchester; Seasonal: Bristol,Geneva (begins 19 December 2026)
Loganair	Birmingham, Edinburgh, Liverpool, London–Heathrow, Manchester, Newquay (Note: Newquay service is a continuation of the Manchester service as the same flight number)

== Other tenants ==
Now-defunct regional airlines Citywing and Manx Airlines had their head offices on the airport property. The Manx Military and Aviation Museum is situated next to the airport and has exhibits and information about the history of aviation on the island.

== Statistics ==
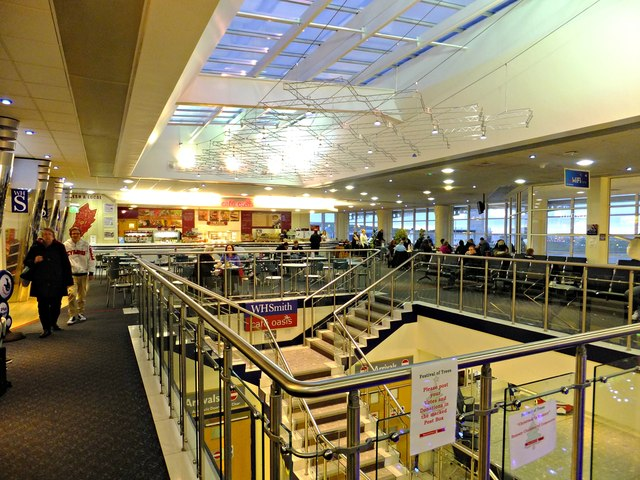
Terminal interior

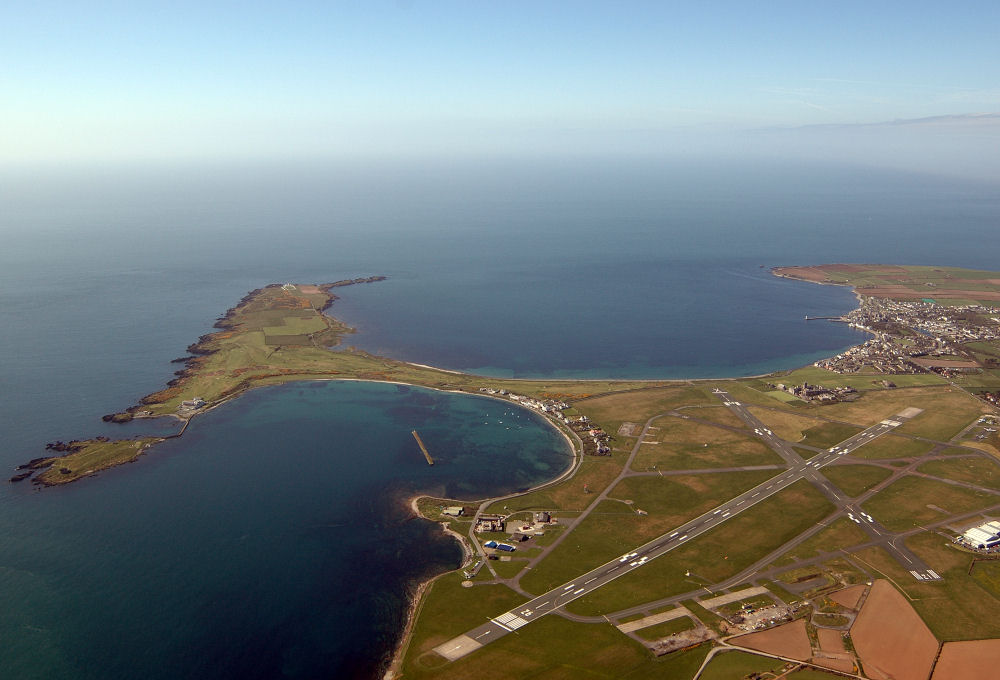
Aerial view

Year	Passenger numbers	
Year	Total	% change
2014	729,703	-
2015	781,601	▲7.1%
2016	791,651	▲1.3%
2017	797,615	▲0.8%
2018	787,257	▼1.3%
2019	854,676	▲8.6%
2020	162,898	▼80.9%
2021	182,371	▲12.0%
2022	562,490	▲208.4%
2023	649,342	▲15.4%
2024	652,274	▲0.5%

=== Route statistics ===
Busiest routes to and from Isle of Man Airport (2024)
Rank	Airport	Passengers handled	% change
1	Liverpool	178,036	▲3.9%
2	London-Gatwick	165,176	▲3.4%
3	Manchester	121,233	▲1.4%
4	Dublin	39,701	▲2.5%
5	London-Heathrow	33,732	▲1.7%
6	Bristol	20,743	▼23.4%
7	London-City	19,056	▲4.3%
8	Birmingham	18,336	▼8.5%
9	Belfast-International	17,855	▼10.6%
10	Edinburgh	9,344	▼16.7%

== Ground transport ==
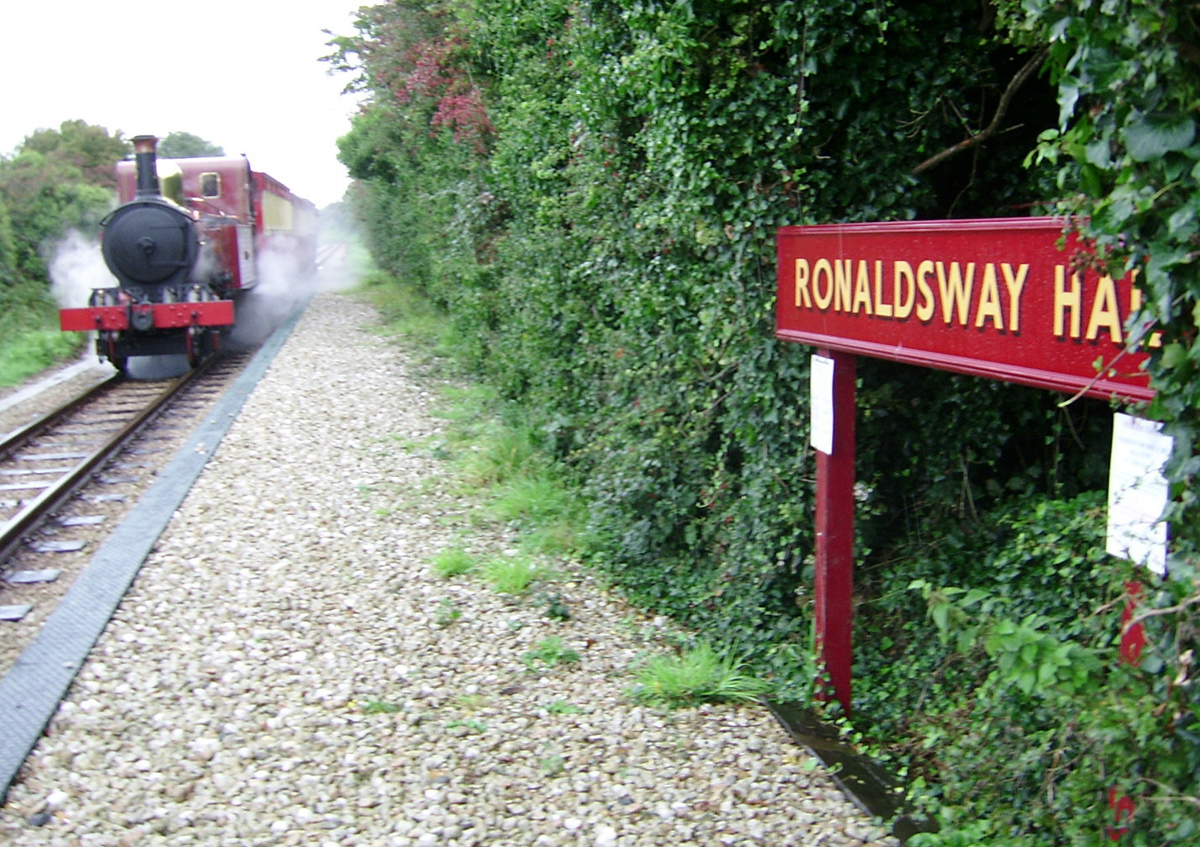
Ronaldsway railway halt with a train arriving from Douglas.

Bus services are provided by Bus Vannin, formerly Isle of Man Transport, to Douglas, Castletown, Colby, Port Erin, Port St Mary, Peel, St John's, Foxdale and Castletown.

Ronaldsway railway station on the Isle of Man Railway is roughly 600 metres walk from the airport, and is sometimes used by air passengers.

== Airport emergency services ==
=== Police and security service ===
The Isle of Man Airport Police was a small independent police service providing security and policing at the airport site, with warranted constables, known as "aviation security officers" (ASO). Under Manx law ASOs had full police powers, including the power of arrest, whilst on airport property. For major crimes the airport police was supported by the Isle of Man Constabulary. The airport police were disbanded at the end of September 2019, with the responsibility for airfield security passing to a private contractor.

== Accidents and incidents ==
- On 26 January 1935, Hillman's Airways de Havilland Dragon Rapide G-ACPO, operating a mail flight from Aldergrove Airport, Belfast to Stapleford Aerodrome, Abridge, Essex via Speke Airport, Liverpool, Merseyside crashed at Derbyhaven, Isle of Man, whilst attempting to divert to Ronaldsway during bad weather.

== See also ==
- RAF Jurby
- RAF Andreas
