= List of Isle of Man railway lines and locations =

The Isle of Man has many railway lines, both current and historical. This is a list of those lines intended to carry passengers, either for public transport, local convenience, or as a tourist attraction. For many of the lines, locations such as stations, stops and depots are listed.

== Isle of Man Railway – South Line ==
Point	Coordinates (Links to map resources)	OS Grid Ref	Notes
Douglas	54.1478°N 4.4861°W	SC37727529	
Port Soderick	54.1265°N 4.5384°W	SC34227305	
Santon	54.1182°N 4.5841°W	SC31207223	
Ballasalla	54.0961°N 4.6288°W	SC28196988	
Ronaldsway	54.0881°N 4.6425°W	SC27266902	
Castletown	54.0787°N 4.6488°W	SC26816799	
Ballabeg	54.0911°N 4.6739°W	SC25226943	
Colby	54.0944°N 4.7042°W	SC23256988	
The Level	54.0914°N 4.7211°W	SC22136959	
Port St Mary	54.081°N 4.743°W	SC20666848	
Port Erin	54.085°N 4.758°W	SC19696897	

== Isle of Man Railway – Peel Line (closed) ==
Point	Coordinates (Links to map resources)	OS Grid Ref	Notes
Peel	54.2219°N 4.6974°W	SC24248404	
Knockaloe railway station and branch line	54.2055°N 4.7038°W	SC23758223	
Knockaloe Internment Camp	54.2054°N 4.7046°W	SC23708222	
St John's	54.2012°N 4.6415°W	SC27798160	
Ballacraine	54.1986°N 4.6325°W	SC28378129	
Crosby	54.182°N 4.566°W	SC32647928	
Union Mills	54.169°N 4.52°W	SC35597773	
Braddan Bridge § Railway halt	54.1615°N 4.5056°W	SC36507686	
Quarterbridge Crossing	54.1558°N 4.5017°W	SC36737622	
Douglas	54.1478°N 4.4861°W	SC37727529	

== Isle of Man Railway – North Line (closed) ==
Point	Coordinates (Links to map resources)	OS Grid Ref	Notes
Ramsey station	54.322°N 4.387°W	SC44859445	
Lezayre	54.325°N 4.429°W	SC42139487	
Sulby Bridge	54.324°N 4.472°W	SC39339486	
Sulby Glen	54.319°N 4.491°W	SC38079435	
Ballavolley Halt	54.315°N 4.517°W	SC36369396	
Ballaugh	54.31°N 4.541°W	SC34789346	
Bishop's Court	54.3036°N 4.5703°W	SC32859282	
Kirk Michael	54.284°N 4.587°W	SC31699068	
West Berk	54.2713°N 4.5998°W	SC30808930	
Gob-y-Deigan	54.253°N 4.633°W	SC28568734	
St. Germain's	54.236°N 4.654°W	SC27128550	
Peel Road	54.215°N 4.66°W	SC26658318	
St John's	54.2012°N 4.6415°W	SC27798160	

== Isle of Man Railway – Foxdale Line (closed) ==
Point	Coordinates (Links to map resources)	OS Grid Ref	Notes
St John's	54.2012°N 4.6415°W	SC27798160	
Waterfall	54.18°N 4.642°W	SC27677924	
Foxdale	54.17°N 4.636°W	SC28027812	

== Douglas Bay Horse Tramway ==
Point	Coordinates (Links to map resources)	OS Grid Ref	Notes
Derby Castle	54.1671°N 4.4612°W	SC39427738	
Regency Hotel	54.1660°N 4.4652°W	SC39157727	
The Hydro	54.1641°N 4.4685°W	SC38937707	
The Palace Hotel	54.1627°N 4.4710°W	SC38767692	
Castle Terrace	54.1612°N 4.4733°W	SC38617675	
The Esplanade	54.1584°N 4.4760°W	SC38427645	
Gaiety Theatre	54.1553°N 4.4780°W	SC38287611	(Currently closed)
Loch Promenade	54.1515°N 4.4779°W	SC38277569	(Currently closed)
Regent Street	54.1500°N 4.4771°W	SC38327552	(Currently closed)
Sea Terminal	54.1491°N 4.4754°W	SC38427541	(Currently closed)

(All stops except the termini are request stops.)

== Upper Douglas Cable Tramway (closed) ==
The locations listed mark road junctions, not stations or request stops.

Point	Coordinates (Links to map resources)	OS Grid Ref	Notes
Southern terminal	54.1490°N 4.4746°W	SC38477540	Junction with horse tramway
Duke Street	54.1493°N 4.4785°W	SC38227544	
Ridgeway Street	54.1493°N 4.4805°W	SC38097545	
Athol Street	54.1499°N 4.4807°W	SC38087551	
Circular Road	54.1513°N 4.4829°W	SC37947568	
Demesne Road	54.1533°N 4.4845°W	SC37847590	
Rose Mount	54.1547°N 4.4847°W	SC37847606	
Albany Road	54.1586°N 4.4869°W	SC37717650	
York Road	54.1612°N 4.4847°W	SC37867678	Sole tramway shelter remains in situ
Drury Terrace	54.1605°N 4.4818°W	SC38057670	Junction to works and carsheds
Victoria Road	54.1584°N 4.4795°W	SC38197646	Later terminal
Northern terminal	54.1571°N 4.4770°W	SC38357631	Section removed early

== Snaefell Mountain Railway ==
Point	Coordinates (Links to map resources)	OS Grid Ref	Notes
Laxey	54.2319°N 4.4058°W	SC43288447	Interchange with Manx Electric Railway
The Bungalow	54.2513°N 4.4637°W	SC39588675	
Snaefell Summit	54.2622°N 4.463°W	SC39678797	

== Manx Electric Railway ==
Most of these are "request stops": passengers alighting here should let the train crew know in advance.

Point	Coordinates (Links to map resources)	OS Grid Ref	Notes
#Ramsey railway station (Manx Electric Railway)	54.3206°N 4.3818°W	SC45189428	for Ramsey; Grove Museum and other attractions. Bus services from Ramsey to various villages in the north of the island.
Belle Vue Halt	54.3097°N 4.3614°W	SC46469302	
Lewaigue	54.3022°N 4.3524°W	SC47029217	for Venture Centre
Ballajora Halt	54.2887°N 4.3361°W	SC48039063	for Maughold Church (1 mile walk)
Cornaa	54.2832°N 4.3573°W	SC46639007	
Ballaglass Glen Halt	54.2803°N 4.3653°W	SC46108976	for Ballaglass Glen
Glen Mona	54.27°N 4.3761°W	SC45368864	for Glen Mona Hotel
Dhoon Quarry Halt	54.2558°N 4.3716°W	SC45608705	
Dhoon Glen Halt	54.2498°N 4.3770°W	SC45238639	for Dhoon Glen
Minorca Halt	54.2296°N 4.3951°W	SC43978419	for much of Laxey village, King Orry's Grave
#Laxey	54.2319°N 4.4058°W	SC43288447	for Snaefell Mountain Railway, Laxey Wheel, Great Laxey Mine Railway, and other attractions
South Cape Halt	54.2247°N 4.395°W	SC43968364	for Laxey Beach; Old Laxey
Fairy Cottage Halt	54.2211°N 4.3991°W	SC43688325	
Ballabeg tram stop	54.2133°N 4.4056°W	SC43228240	
Baldrine	54.2022°N 4.4123°W	SC42748118	
Groudle Glen	54.1780°N 4.4304°W	SC41477853	for Groudle Glen Railway
#Derby Castle terminus, Douglas	54.1669°N 4.4608°W	SC39457736	for Douglas, Douglas Bay Horse Tramway

# Major station with booking office and other facilities

== Groudle Glen Railway ==
Point	Coordinates (Links to map resources)	OS Grid Ref	Notes
Lhen Coan	54.1789°N 4.4269°W	SC41707862	
Lime Kiln Halt	54.1764°N 4.4215°W	SC42057833	
Headland	54.1759°N 4.4202°W	SC42137827	Temporary terminus
Sea Lion Rocks	54.1773°N 4.4171°W	SC42347842	

== Great Laxey Mine Railway ==
Point	Coordinates (Links to map resources)	OS Grid Ref	Notes
Valley Gardens	54.2338°N 4.4053°W	SC43328468	
Mines Yard	54.2362°N 4.4068°W	SC43238495	

== Douglas Southern Electric Tramway (closed) ==
Point	Coordinates (Links to map resources)	OS Grid Ref	Notes
Douglas Head	54.1434°N 4.4695°W	SC38797477	
Marine Drive Arch	54.1407°N 4.4707°W	SC38707447	
Pigeon Stream Depot	54.1378°N 4.4797°W	SC38107417	
Wallberry Viaduct	54.1314°N 4.4955°W	SC37047349	
Horseleap Viaduct	54.1300°N 4.4980°W	SC36877334	
Little Ness Depot	54.1276°N 4.5044°W	SC36447309	
Whing Loop	54.1297°N 4.5113°W	SC36007334	
Port Soderick	54.1243°N 4.5302°W	SC34757278	

== Cliff railways ==
Point	Coordinates (Links to map resources)	OS Grid Ref	Notes
First Falcon Cliff Lift (closed)	54.1635°N 4.4708°W	SC38787700	
Second Falcon Cliff Lift (closed)	54.1633°N 4.4716°W	SC38737698	
Douglas Head Funicular Railway (closed)	54.1439°N 4.4675°W	SC38927482	
Laxey Browside Tramway (closed)	54.2380°N 4.4079°W	SC43178515	
Port Soderick Cliff Lift (closed)	54.1240°N 4.5304°W	SC34737275	

== Other railways ==
Point	Coordinates (Links to map resources)	OS Grid Ref	Notes
Orchid Line, Curraghs Wildlife Park	54.3178°N 4.5127°W	SC36669426	231795 The Orchid Line on OpenStreetMap
Queen's Pier Tramway (closed)	54.3194°N 4.3707°W	SC45909412	30647369 Queen's Pier Tramway on OpenStreetMap
