= Dhoon Farm Halt =

Railway station in Isle of Man, UK

Coordinates: 54.2544508°N 4.3721600°W

Dhoon Farm Balley Dhoon
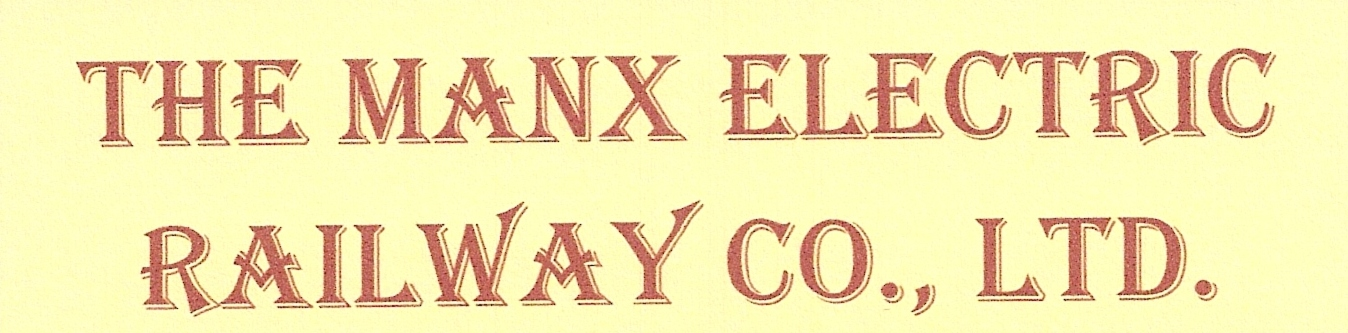

General information
- Location: Pole Nos. 549-550, Maughold, Isle Of Man
- System: Manx Electric Railway
- Owner: Isle Of Man Heritage Railways
- Platforms: Ground Level
- Tracks: Two Running Lines

Construction
- Structure type: None
- Parking: None

History
- Opened: 1900
- Former names: Manx Electric Railway Co., Ltd.
Location

Dhoon Farm Halt (Manx: Stadd Valley Dhoon) is a diminutive rural request stop on the northern section of the Manx Electric Railway on the Isle of Man, catering almost exclusively for local traffic. Due to the nature of the tramway's construction, the cars can stop and drop off almost anywhere and will do so within reason. For this reason a great number of localised stopping places have built up since the line was completed, many at the intersection of farmer's crossings like this one. The crossings/halts usually take the name of the farmer or the farm as is the case here, but these unofficial halts never appear in timetable materials or have nameboards fitted to show their names. Many do however now carry bus stop-type signs attached to traction poles, and these were fitted in line with then-management policy in 1999.

Preceding station	Manx Electric Railway	Following station
Burn's Crossing towards Derby Castle	Douglas–Ramsey	Dhoon Quarry towards Ramsey Station

== See also ==
- Manx Electric Railway stations

== Sources ==
- Manx Electric Railway Stopping Places (2002) Manx Electric Railway Society
- Island Images: Manx Electric Railway Pages (2003) Jon Wornham
- Official Tourist Department Page (2009) Isle Of Man Heritage Railways
