= Laxey Old Road Halt =

Railway station in Isle of Man, UK

Coordinates: 54.22820°N 4.38880°W

Laxey Old Road Shann Raad Laksaa
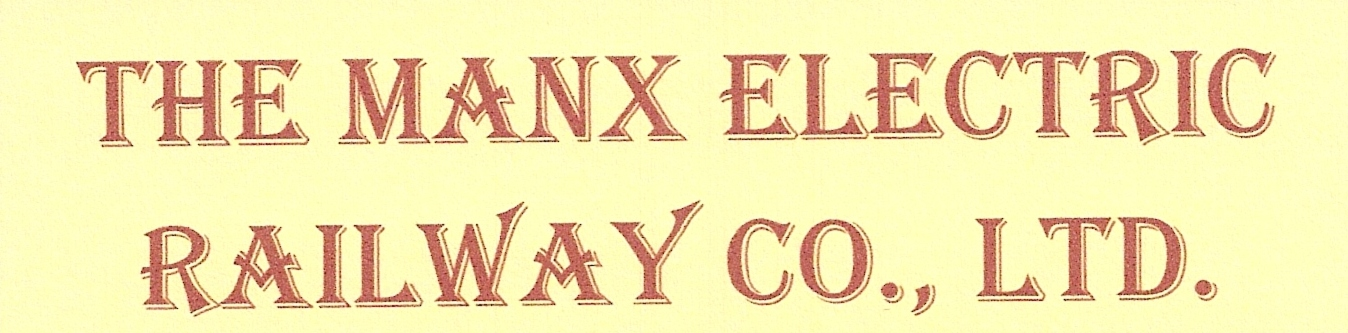

General information
- Location: Pole Nos. 424-425, Laxey, Isle Of Man
- System: Manx Electric Railway
- Owner: Isle Of Man Heritage Railways
- Platforms: Ground Level
- Tracks: Two Running Lines

Construction
- Parking: None

History
- Opened: 1894
- Former names: Manx Electric Railway Co., Ltd.
Location

Laxey Old Road (Manx: Stadd Shann Raad Laksaa) is a diminutive request-only stop on the northern side of the valley on the climb out of Laxey on the Manx Electric Railway on the Isle of Man, and serves the local community rather than visiting tourists. It, like many of the other small stops on the line established itself over a number of years as a requested stop for local traffic but despite this, and in common with many similar halts, it has never been included on the timetable for any of the line's services. Its location is above an area known locally as "Little Egypt" because it was used as a tipping ground for the ore spoils of the Great Laxey Mines, giving the area the appearance of what looked like pyramids. These spoils have long-since disappeared and the area is a desirable residential area.

Preceding station	Manx Electric Railway	Following station
Minorca towards Derby Castle	Douglas–Ramsey	Skinscoe towards Ramsey Station

== Also ==
Manx Electric Railway Stations

== Sources ==
- Manx Manx Electric Railway Stopping Places (2002) Manx Electric Railway Society
- Island Island Images: Manx Electric Railway Pages (2003) Jon Wornham
- Official Official Tourist Department Page (2009) Isle Of Man Heritage Railways
