= Ballaragh Halt =

Railway station on the Isle of Man

Ballaragh (Bulgham) Balley Ragh (Yn Volgan)
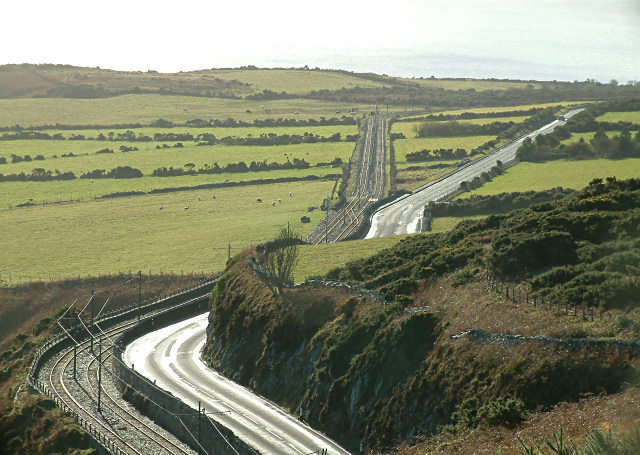

General information
- Location: Lonan, Isle Of Man
- Coordinates: 54.24205°N 4.37309°W
- Pole Nos.: 488-489
- System: Manx Electric Railway
- Owner: Isle Of Man Railways
- Platforms: Ground Level
- Tracks: Two Running Lines

Construction
- Parking: None

History
- Opened: 1899
- Rebuilt: 2009
- Former names: Manx Electric Railway Co.
Location

Ballaragh Halt (sometimes Bulgham) (Manx: Stadd Balley Ragh (Yn Volgan)) is an intermediate stopping place on the northerly section of the Manx Electric Railway on the Isle of Man.

== Location ==
It is the nearest stopping place to the line's summit. The halt is little used today but following a large landslip that severed the line in 1967 it acted as the railway's temporary terminus. Passengers would disembark their tramcar, walk onto the road and re-board a northerly based car to continue their journey. The halt serves the small hamlet of the same name, and is sometimes referred to as "Bulgham Bay" in literature.

== Platforms ==
The site of the halt is discernible from the main road that runs parallel as it features a set of steps for passengers built into the stone wall that separates the two. During July 2009 at a point a little further north of the station, a viewing platform consisting of planking and railings was erected here to demarcate the passenger-accessible land for special tram services that operate in the area.

== Dedication ==
Further north still is the summit of the line, at which point a plaque has been erected to the memory of Mike Goodwyn, historian and chairman of the Manx Electric Railway Society and this is visible from the passing tramcars.

== Route ==
Preceding station	Manx Electric Railway	Following station
Ballamoar (T) towards Derby Castle	Douglas–Ramsey	Dhoon Glen towards Ramsey Station

== Also ==
Manx Electric Railway Stations

== Sources ==
- Manx Manx Electric Railway Stopping Places (2002) Manx Electric Railway Society
- Island Island Images: Manx Electric Railway Pages (2003) Jon Wornham
- Official Tourist Department Page (2009) Isle Of Man Heritage Railways
