= Dumbell's Row Halt =

Railway station in Isle of Man, UK

Coordinates: 54.23375°N 4.40618°W

Dumbell's Row Staad Boirey Dumbell
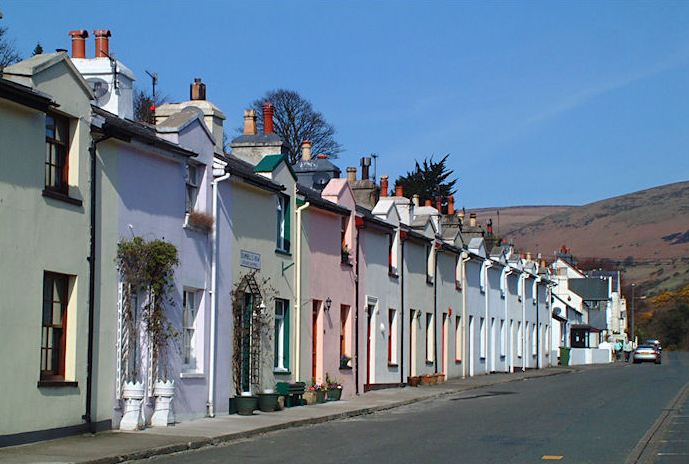

General information
- Location: Pole Nos. 371-372, Laxey, Isle Of Man
- System: Manx Electric Railway
- Owner: Isle of Man Heritage Railways
- Platforms: Ground level
- Tracks: Running lines and siding

Construction
- Parking: Nearby

History
- Opened: 1901
- Former names: Manx Electric Railway Co., Ltd.
Location

Dumbell's Row is an intermediate stopping place on the Manx Electric Railway on the Isle of Man and is the first station on the northern section of the line from Laxey, which opened in 1899.

== Location ==
The stop serves the village and is the nearest tram stop to the Laxey Wheel. It is located to the north of the village's main station.

== Siding ==
Nearby is a siding that is now used to house the line's permanent way rolling stock. Originally, it was used for the Year of Railways main event in 1993. During this event, Isle of Man Railway locomotive No. 4, Loch (built in 1874), operated services between here and Dhoon Quarry as part of a series of special events.

== Reenactment ==
There was some historical precedent for this, as during the construction of the electric line, locomotives from the other railway were contracted for haulage purposes.

== Facilities ==
The area was also the site of a temporary booking office (portakabin) specifically for these services. Today, the halt is served by a dual-purpose shelter located at the end of the terrace from which it takes its name, also known as "Ham & Egg Terrace."

== Mines railway ==
Nearby is the Great Laxey Mines Railway, a reconstruction of an original 19-inch gauge line that served the mines. The line was rebuilt in recent times by a group of enthusiasts.

== Route ==
| Preceding station | Manx Electric Railway | Following station |
|---|---|---|
| Laxey towards Derby Castle | Douglas–Ramsey | Minorca towards Ramsey Station |

== See also ==
Manx Electric Railway stations

== Sources ==
- Manx Manx Electric Railway Stopping Places (2002) Manx Electric Railway Society
- Island Island Images: Manx Electric Railway Pages (2003) Jon Wornham
- Official Official Tourist Department Page (2009) Isle Of Man Heritage Railways
