= Dhoon Quarry Halt =

Railway station in Isle of Man, UK

Dhoon Quarry Quarral Dhoon
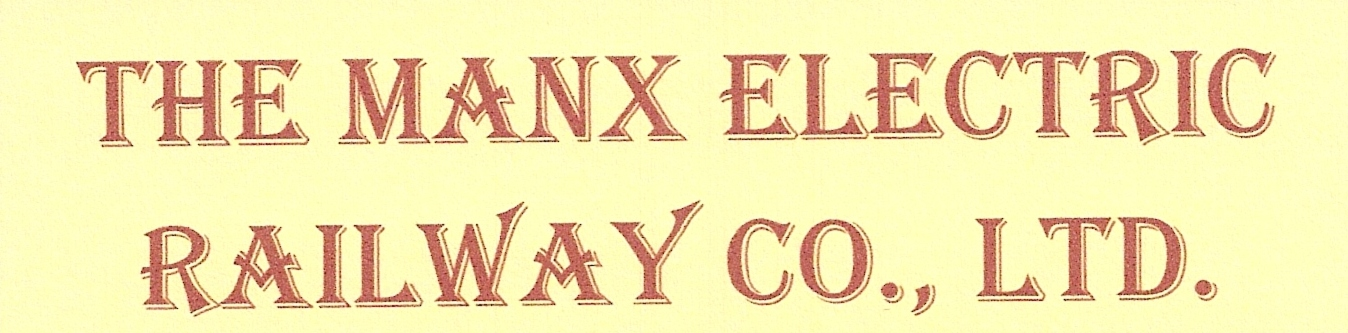

General information
- Location: Maughold, Isle Of Man
- Coordinates: 54.2558897°N 4.3716312°W
- Pole Nos.: 555-556
- System: Manx Electric Railway
- Owner: Isle Of Man Railways
- Platforms: Ground Level (See Text)
- Tracks: Various Running Lines (See Text)

Construction
- Structure type: Cottage (Extant)
- Parking: Adjacent

History
- Opened: 1900
- Former names: Manx Electric Railway Co.
Location

Dhoon Quarry Halt (Manx: Stadd Wharral Dhoon) is a rural request stop on the northern section of the Manx Electric Railway on the Isle of Man, close to the quarry with which it shares its name. Although the quarry is no longer active, the area is now one of the line's bases for permanent way supplies and stock, and during the 1990s it provided the terminus for the Year Of Railways (1993) event featuring steam locomotive No. 4 "Loch" of the Isle of Man Railway hauling trailers over the metals of the Manx Electric Railway between Dumbell's Row and this point. For this reason there is a concrete-built docking area built especially for the locomotive to take on coal and water, which has more recently been used as a loading area for flatbed wagons on the line. In addition to the two usual running lines (a crossover is also located at this point) there are several sidings, a fraction of what was once here, and these were used solely in connection with quarry traffic. A collection of buildings were also extant, including the "Creosote Cottage" and the body off a 10-12 class tramcar used as a storeroom for many years. By the time of the 1993 events the area had been tidied up, portaloos installed and many of the old building disappeared. The stone-built cottage remains in situ however and is used in connection with permanent way duties. From a passing tram today, there are always items of interest here, it is where the 0-6-0 diesel locomotive "Bertie" is usually stored together with a stockpile of replacement sleepers.

Preceding station	Manx Electric Railway	Following station
Dhoon Farm towards Derby Castle	Douglas–Ramsey	Thalloo Mitchell towards Ramsey Station

== See also ==
- Manx Electric Railway stations

== Sources ==
- Manx Electric Railway Stopping Places (2002) Manx Electric Railway Society
- Island Images: Manx Electric Railway Pages (2003) Jon Wornham
- Official Tourist Department Page (2009) Isle Of Man Heritage Railways
