= Minorca Halt =

Railway station on the Isle of Man

Minorca Minorca
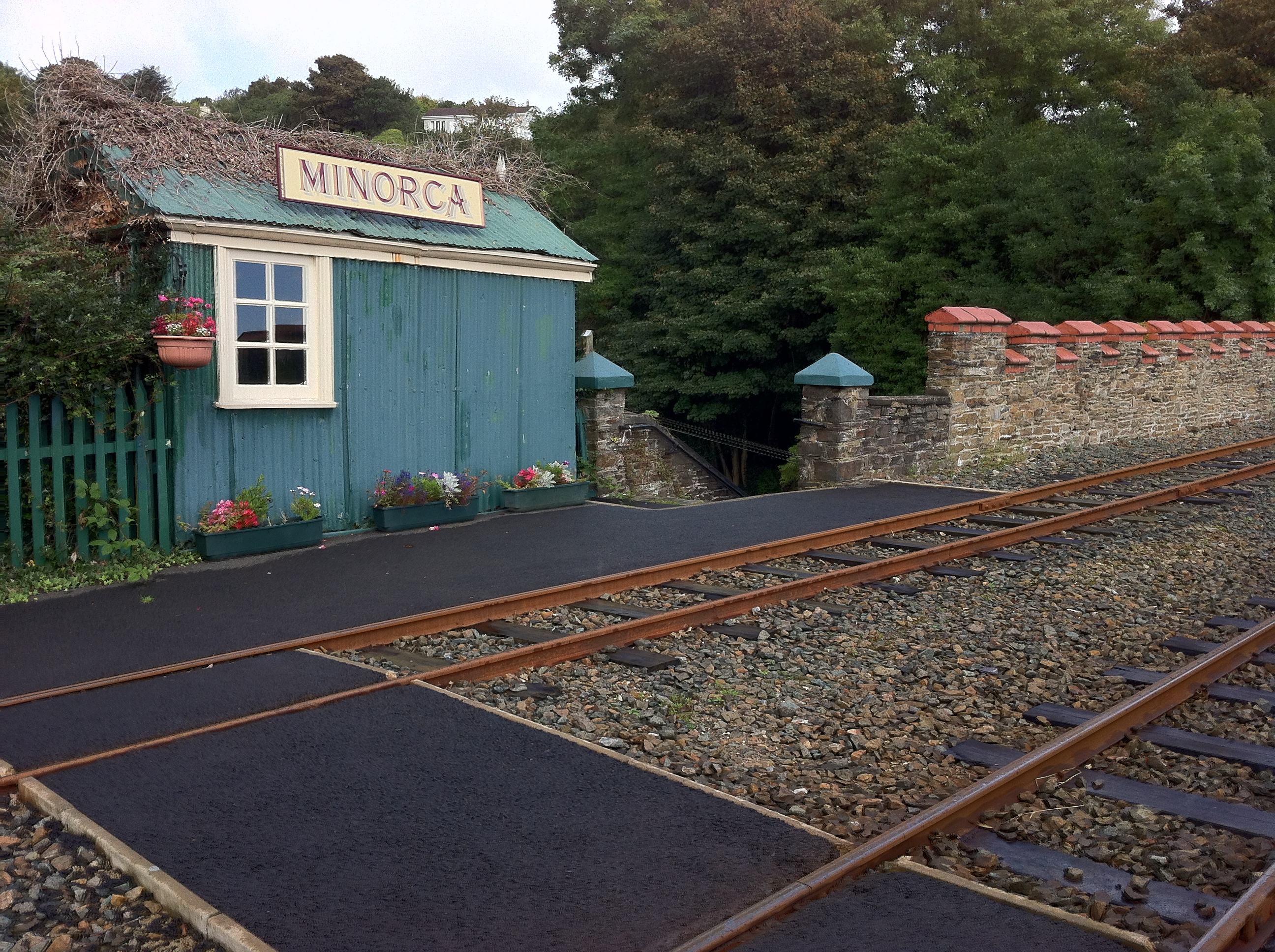

General information
- Location: Laxey, Isle Of Man
- Coordinates: 54°13′46″N 4°23′46″W
- Pole Nos.: 409-410
- System: Manx Electric Railway
- Owner: Isle of Man Heritage Railways
- Platforms: Ground Level
- Tracks: Two Running Lines

Construction
- Structure type: Shelter Only
- Parking: None

History
- Opened: 1899
- Former names: Manx Electric Railway Co., Ltd.
Location

Minorca Halt (Manx: Stadd Minorca) is an intermediate stopping place on the northern section of the Manx Electric Railway on the Isle of Man.

== Location ==
It is situated next to the viaduct of the same name and in typical style of the railway is served only by a corrugated iron hut painted in the familiar colour scheme of green and cream. The hut that stands at this halt was originally erected in about 1900 at Halfway House and later removed to its present location.

== Access ==
The halt is accessible via a series of steps to the old road below.

== Route ==
| Preceding station | Manx Electric Railway | Following station |
|---|---|---|
| Dumbell's Row towards Derby Castle | Douglas–Ramsey | Old Road towards Ramsey Station |

== Also ==
Manx Electric Railway Stations

== Sources ==
- Manx Electric Railway Stopping Places (2002) Manx Electric Railway Society
- Island Images: Manx Electric Railway Pages (2003) Jon Wornham
- Official Tourist Department Page (2009) Isle Of Man Heritage Railways
