= Brown's Crossing =

Brown's Crossing or Browns Crossing may refer to:

- Brown's Crossing (Manx Electric Railway), a railroad stop on the Isle of Man
- Browns Crossing, Georgia, an unincorporated community
