= Dhoon Glen Halt =

Railway station in Isle of Man, UK

Dhoon Glen Glion y Dhoon
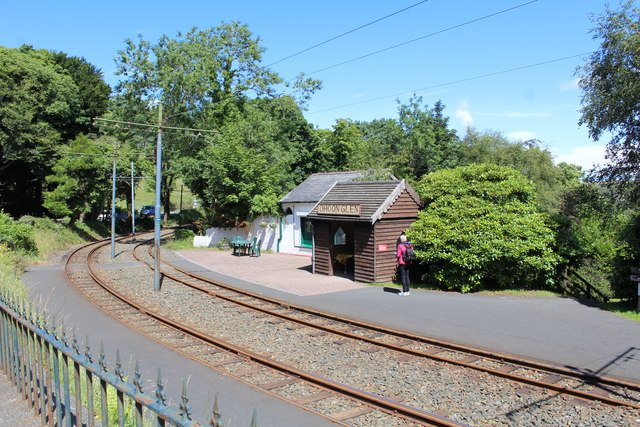
- The station in 2016, after renovation

General information
- Location: Maughold, Isle Of Man
- Coordinates: 54°15′01″N 4°22′35″W
- Pole Nos.: 530-532
- System: Manx Electric Railway
- Owner: Isle Of Man Railways
- Platforms: Ground Level
- Tracks: Two Running Lines

Construction
- Structure type: Waiting Shelter / Cafe
- Parking: Adjacent

History
- Opened: 1899
- Rebuilt: 1987
Location

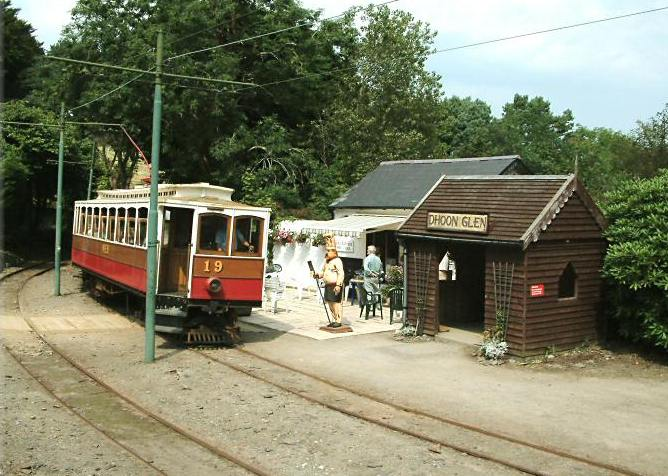
The station in 2003, before renovation

Dhoon Glen Halt (Manx: Stadd Ghlion y Dhoon) is an intermediate stopping place on the northern section of the Manx Electric Railway in the Isle of Man. It is not to be confused with Dhoon Halt, which is the next halt, about 600 metres to the north.

== Location ==
The stop lies on the A2, at the southern end of the parish of Maughold. It is at the top of the Dhoon Glen, one of the island's National Glens. This is a steep wooded glen which runs west to east for about 1 km and leads to a secluded pebble beach. The halt is on a bend in both the road and the railway (both following the contour of the land), and has its own tiny cafe which has been there for many years, latterly known as "Jean's Place" among other titles, it is currently called the "Dhoon Coffee Stop".

== Dhoon Glen Hotel ==
There is a large unsurfaced car park opposite the halt, on the site of the Dhoon Glen Hotel which was destroyed by fire in 1917 and never rebuilt. The old station shelter, separate from the cafe (which houses passenger toilet facilities beneath it) was replaced in 1987 with a more modern structure, and now forms a passenger shelter in addition to being covered accommodation for the cafe as required.

== Renovation ==
The area was renovated in 2008 and the station platform area block paved to rail level, creating a clearly demarcated passenger/customer area.

== Route ==
Preceding station	Manx Electric Railway	Following station
Ballaragh towards Derby Castle	Douglas–Ramsey	Burn's Crossing towards Ramsey Station

== See also ==
- Manx Electric Railway stations

== Sources ==
- Manx Electric Railway Stopping Places (2002) Manx Electric Railway Society
- Island Images: Manx Electric Railway Pages (2003) Jon Wornham
- Official Tourist Department Page (2009) Isle Of Man Heritage Railways
