= Cornaa railway station =

Intermediate stopping place on the Isle of Man

Cornaa Cornaa
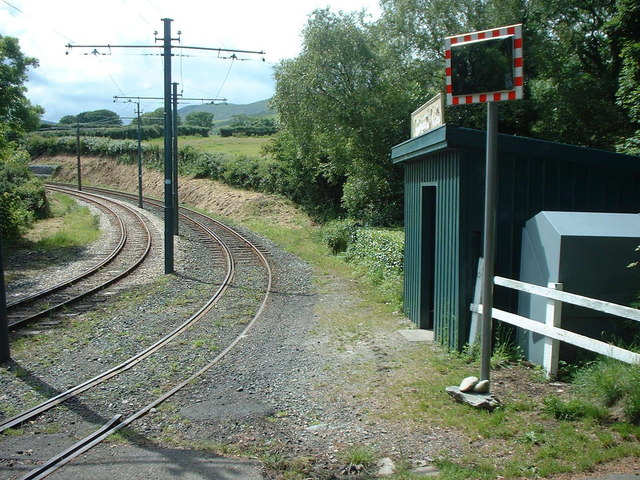

General information
- Location: Maughold, Isle Of Man
- Coordinates: 54°17′00″N 4°21′29″W
- System: Manx Electric Railway
- Owner: Isle Of Man Railways
- Platforms: Ground Level
- Tracks: Two Running Lines

Construction
- Structure type: Waiting Shelter
- Parking: None

History
- Opened: 1899
Location

Cornaa Halt (Manx: Stadd Cornaa) is an intermediate stopping place on the northern section of the Manx Electric Railway on the Isle of Man.

== Location ==
The stop is in the parish of Maughold, about halfway between Laxey and Ramsey. It is a short distance away from the previous halt at Ballaglass Glen, but has road access unlike the latter.

== Facilities ==
There is a typical Manx Electric Railway style waiting hut here that was refurbished by the Manx Electric Railway Society in 2003 and the station also has a post box, a remnant of the times when the company held the contract for mail collection; this ceased in 1975.

== Glen ==
The halt serves the glen of the same name which is a short walk from the stopping place; the proximity of the glen is such that this is a popular stopping off place for walkers who can meander through the glen to the nearby beach.

== Route ==
Preceding station	Manx Electric Railway	Following station
Ballaglass towards Derby Castle	Douglas–Ramsey	Crowcreen towards Ramsey Station

== Also ==
Manx Electric Railway Stations

== Sources ==
- Manx Electric Railway Stopping Places (2002) Manx Electric Railway Society
- Island Images: Manx Electric Railway Pages (2003) Jon Wornham
- Official Tourist Department Page (2009) Isle Of Man Heritage Railways
