= Ballaglass Glen Halt =

Railway station in Isle of Man, the UK

Ballaglass Glen Glion Valley Glass
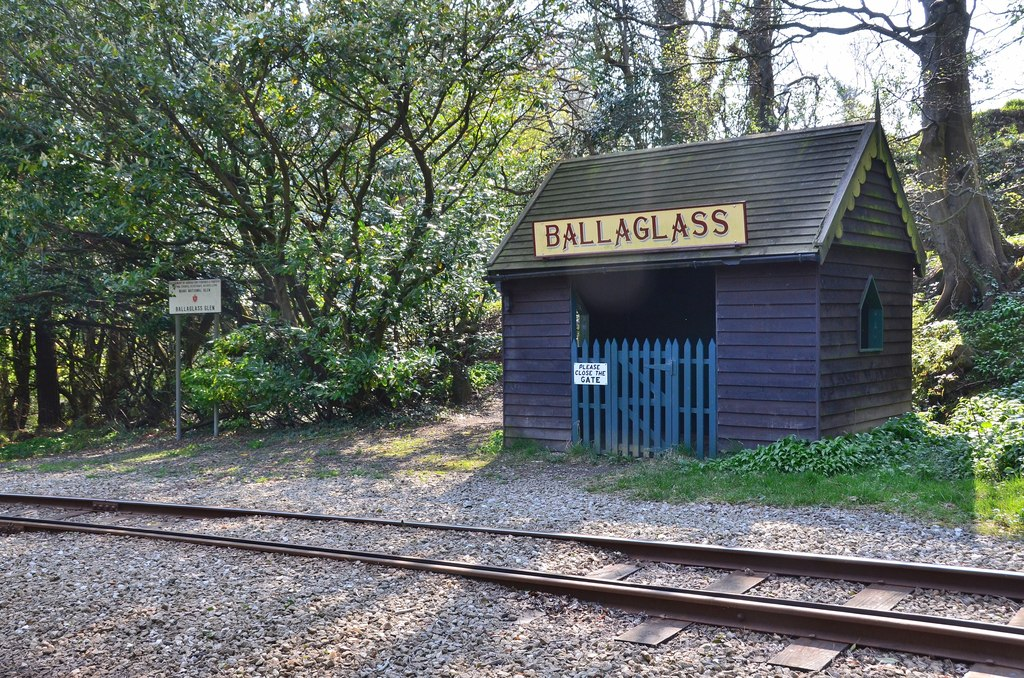

General information
- Location: Maughold, Isle Of Man
- Coordinates: 54°16′49″N 4°21′55″W
- Pole Nos.: 654-655
- System: Manx Electric Railway
- Owner: Isle Of Man Railways
- Platforms: Ground Level
- Tracks: Two Running Lines

Construction
- Structure type: Waiting Shelter
- Parking: None

History
- Opened: 1899
- Former names: Manx Electric Railway Co.
Location

Ballaglass Glen Halt (Manx: Stadd Ghlion Valley Glass) is an intermediate stopping place on the northerly section of the Manx Electric Railway on the Isle of Man.

== Location ==
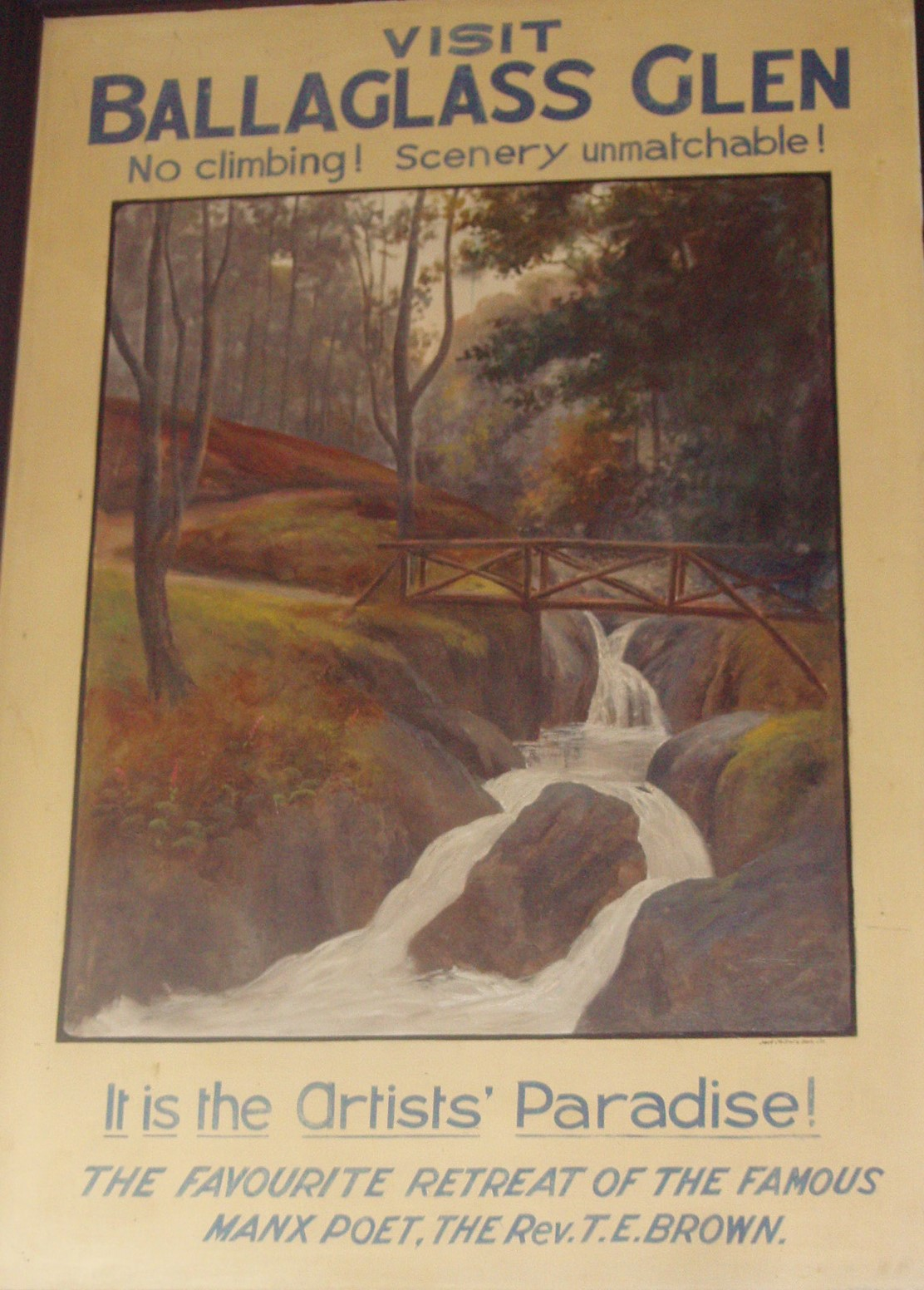
Visit Ballaglass Glen

The halt is located at the entrance to the national glen of the same name and is served only by rail, there being no direct road access to this location.

== Facilities ==
A wooden waiting shelter featuring a sprung gate which is to stop sheep from getting trapped inside it, such is the rural nature of the Manx Electric Railway and its environs. The current shelter was erected in 1987 replacing an earlier version of corrugated iron construction.

== Substation ==
Nearby in a southerly direction is the sub-station building which can be seen through the trees from passing trams; today the majority of this building houses a private dwelling complete with swimming pool in the old boiler house, although a small sub-station still exists on site.

== Route ==
Preceding station	Manx Electric Railway	Following station
Dolland towards Derby Castle	Douglas–Ramsey	Cornaa towards Ramsey Station

== See also ==
- List of Manx Electric Railway stations

== Sources ==
- Manx Electric Railway Stopping Places (2002) Manx Electric Railway Society
- Island Images: Manx Electric Railway Pages (2003) Jon Wornham
- Official Tourist Department Page (2009) Isle Of Man Heritage Railways
