= Browns Crossing, Georgia =

Unincorporated community in Georgia, U.S.

Coordinates: 33°02′51″N 83°21′27″W

Browns Crossing is an unincorporated community in Baldwin County, in the U.S. state of Georgia.

== History ==
Variant names were "Browns" and "Browns Station". Two of the first settlers, the postmaster and a railroad employee, had the surname Brown. A post office called Browns Crossing was established in 1877, and remained in operation until 1931.
