= List of Manx Electric Railway stations =

There are many local stopping places on the Manx Electric Railway on the Isle of Man. Trams may stop wherever it is convenient to do so.

Following is a list of the acknowledged stopping places. The primary (i.e. timetabled) stopping places are as follows, and are those featured on the timetabled services of the railway. The principal stopping points, however, are at Groudle, Laxey and the northern terminus at Ramsey and the following places in between.

== Principal stops ==
Most of these are "request stops": passengers alighting here should let the train crew know in advance.

Point	Coordinates (Links to map resources)	OS Grid Ref	Notes
Ramsey railway station (Manx Electric Railway)	54.3206°N 4.3818°W	SC45189428	for Ramsey; Grove Museum and other attractions. Bus services from Ramsey to various villages in the north of the island.
Belle Vue Halt	54.3097°N 4.3614°W	SC46469302	
Lewaigue	54.3022°N 4.3524°W	SC47029217	for Venture Centre
Ballajora Halt	54.2887°N 4.3361°W	SC48039063	for Maughold Church (1 mile walk)
Cornaa	54.2832°N 4.3573°W	SC46639007	
Ballaglass Glen Halt	54.2803°N 4.3653°W	SC46108976	for Ballaglass Glen
Glen Mona	54.27°N 4.3761°W	SC45368864	for Glen Mona Hotel
Dhoon Quarry Halt	54.2558°N 4.3716°W	SC45608705	
Dhoon Glen Halt	54.2498°N 4.3770°W	SC45238639	for Dhoon Glen
Minorca Halt	54.2296°N 4.3951°W	SC43978419	for much of Laxey village, King Orry's Grave
#Laxey	54.2319°N 4.4058°W	SC43288447	for Snaefell Mountain Railway, Laxey Wheel, Great Laxey Mine Railway, and other attractions
South Cape Halt	54.2247°N 4.395°W	SC43968364	for Laxey Beach; Old Laxey
Fairy Cottage Halt	54.2211°N 4.3991°W	SC43688325	
Ballabeg tram stop	54.2133°N 4.4056°W	SC43228240	
Baldrine	54.2022°N 4.4123°W	SC42748118	
Groudle Glen	54.1780°N 4.4304°W	SC41477853	for Groudle Glen Railway
#Derby Castle terminus, Douglas	54.1669°N 4.4608°W	SC39457736	for Douglas, Douglas Bay Horse Tramway

# Major station with booking office and other facilities

== Other stopping places ==
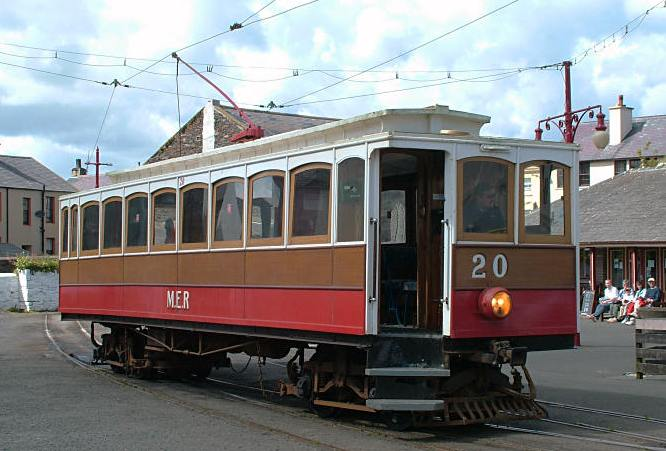
Winter Saloon No. 20 (1899) at Ramsey Plaza Station in the austerity livery in June 2005

In addition to official stations which appear on the timetables, there are also a number of unofficial stopping points and request stops, more recently denoted by the addition of "bus stop" style signs during the late 1990s; prior to this the halts were not demarcated on the line. These can be found along the line at such locations as the former holiday camp at Howstrake, the Liverpool Arms (Halfway House, now known as Balladromma Beg) and Ballure Road. This is not an exhaustive list of every stopping point on the line, however. Trams may stop at virtually any point on the line and double track operation ensures that collisions are avoided. There are crossing points along the line, primarily at the timetabled stopping points, though many are now disused.

== Sources ==
- Manx Electric Railway Stopping Places (2002) Manx Electric Railway Society
- Island Images: Manx Electric Railway Pages (2003) Jon Wornham
- Official Tourist Department Page (2009) Isle Of Man Heritage Railways
