= Manx Electric Railway =

Tramway between Isle of Man towns

Coordinates: 54.157°N 4.464°W

Manx Electric Railway Raad Yiarn Lectragh Vannin

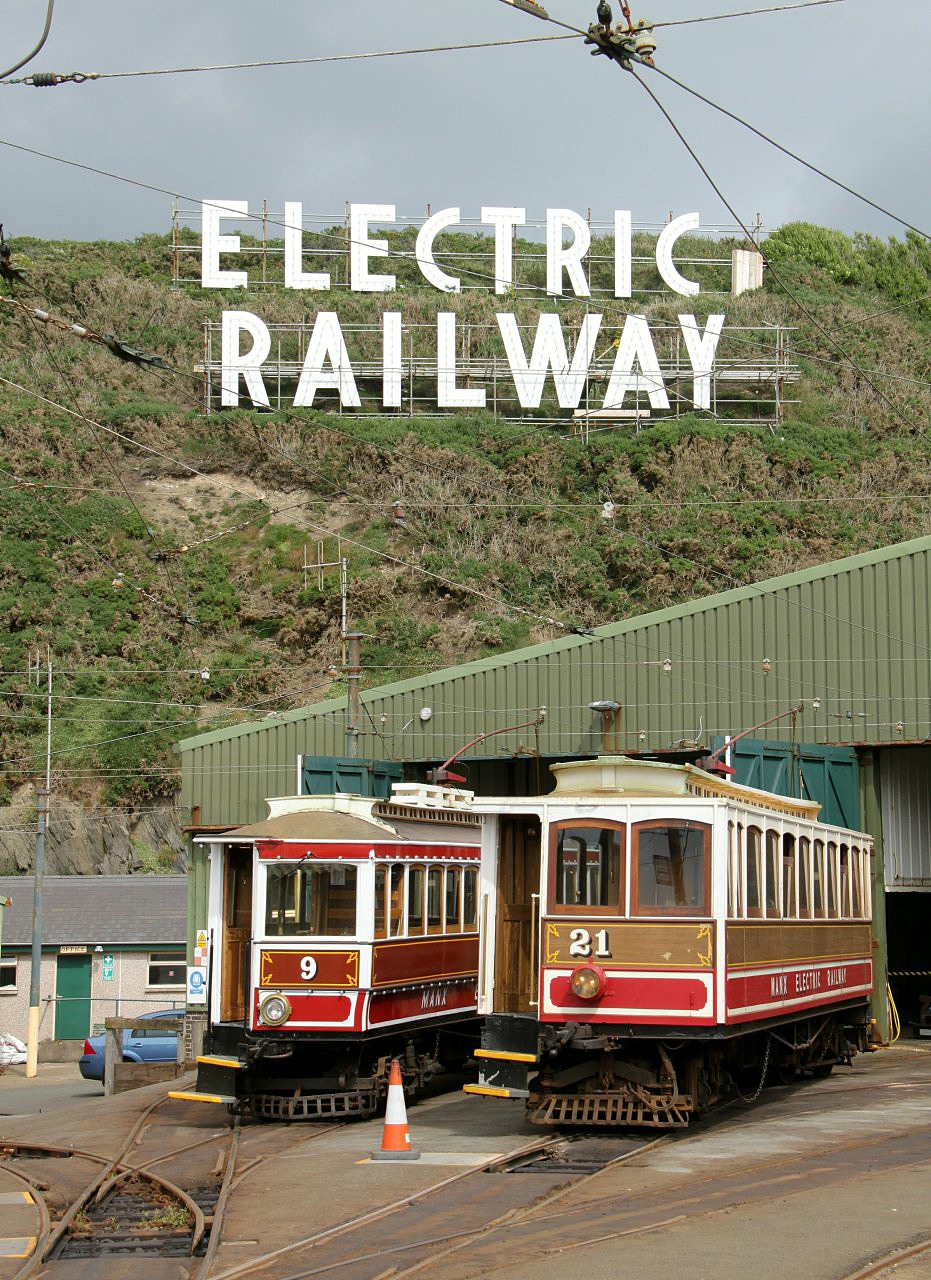
- Cars, shed and sign at Derby Castle

Overview
- Owner: Isle of Man Heritage Railways
- Website: https://manxelectricrailway.co.uk/

History
- Opened: 1893; 133 years ago

Technical
- Line length: 17 mi (27 km)
- Track gauge: 3 ft (914 mm)
- Electrification: Overhead line, 550 V DC
Route map
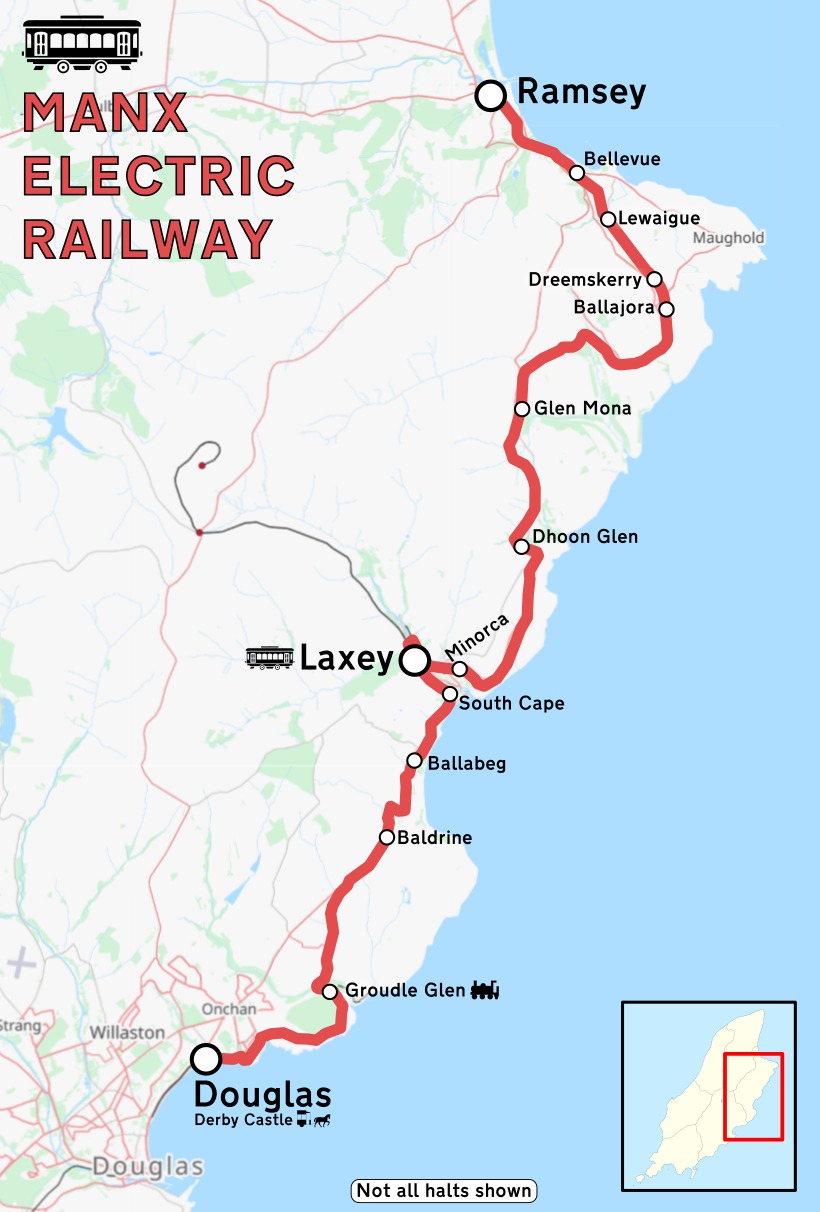
(Click to expand)

The Manx Electric Railway (Manx: Raad Yiarn Lectragh Vannin) is an electric interurban tramway connecting Douglas, Laxey and Ramsey in the Isle of Man. It connects with the Douglas Bay Horse Tramway at its southern terminus at Derby Castle at the northern end of the promenade in Douglas, and with the Snaefell Mountain Railway at Laxey. Many visitors take an excursion on the trams. It is the oldest electric tram line in the world whose original rolling stock is still in service.

== History ==
The Manx Electric Railway was built by Alexander Bruce, a banker, Frederick Saunderson, a civil engineer and Alfred Jones Lusty, a land owner, who formed the Douglas Bay Estate company to develop land north of Douglas.

Construction started in 1893 with the short line from a depot at Derby Castle Depôt in Douglas to Groudle Glen, and regular public services started on 7 September 1893.

Anticipating the second stage of the railway (an extension from Groudle to Laxey), the company was known as the Douglas and Laxey Coast Electric Tramway Company. Construction of this next stage started in February 1894. It was formally opened on 28 July of the same year. The name was temporary, as further expansion was planned, and it became known as the Isle of Man Tramways and Electric Power Company.

An extension to Ramsey was approved in May 1897. The line from Laxey to Ramsey opened on 2 August 1898 by the Lieutenant Governor, John Henniker-Major, 5th Baron Henniker. At that date the line ran as far as Ballure, on the outskirts of Ramsey. The final extension to the centre of Ramsey was opened on 24 July 1899.

=== 20th century ===
The construction of such a lengthy line in a short period of time had stretched the company's finances, and it was £150,000 in debt. The owning bank foreclosed on the loan and as a consequence Dumbell's Bank failed. The company was liquidated. In 1902 the assets were purchased by Herbert Kidson on behalf of a syndicate of businessmen from Manchester, and the Manx Electric Railway company was born. The sale, which included the Snaefell Mountain Railway, was for £252,000 (equivalent to £26,780,000 in 2025).

On 2 August 1902, King Edward VII and Queen Alexandra travelled from Douglas to Ramsey in enclosed trailer No. 59.

In 1917, the refreshment room at Laxey was destroyed by fire. Fire caused more damage at Laxey in 1930, when the car shed was destroyed, along with four cars, seven trailers, three tower wagons and an open wagon. The car shed was later rebuilt.

The railway struggled financially after the end of World War II, and in 1957 it was nationalised at a cost of £50,000 (equivalent to £1,047,200 in 2025). A nationalisation livery of green and white was applied to some trams and trailers for a limited time, though this was unpopular and later dropped. A government board was formed to manage the line and the Snaefell Mountain Railway (and still does so after various changes of title from the original "Manx Electric Railway Board" to "Isle of Man Passenger Transport Board", and now Isle of Man Heritage Railways (the word "heritage" was added in 2009). This is a division of the Department of Infrastructure of the Isle of Man Government, which also operates the island's buses as Bus Vannin).

The government invested heavily in the railway starting in 1957, initiating a rail replacement programme between Derby Castle and Laxey at a cost of £25,000 per year for 10 years. The Laxey to Ramsey section was continually under threat; in 1975, the railway lost the mail contract, and services from Laxey to Ramsey were suspended. After public protest, services to Ramsey restarted in 1977.

=== 21st century ===
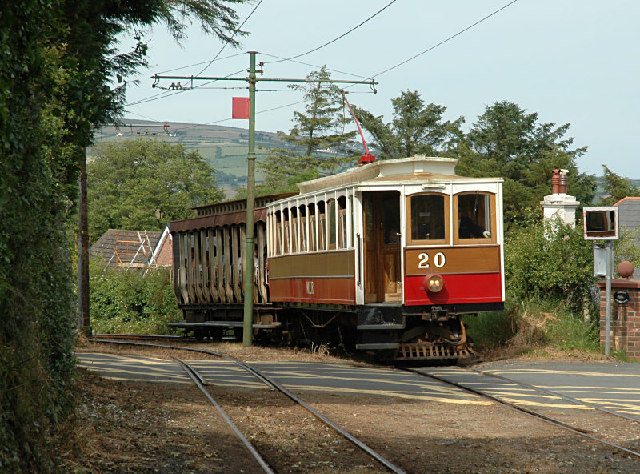
Winter Saloon No. 20 of 1899, Baldrine railway station

The section between Laxey and Ramsey was closed again in summer 2008, after a consultancy report commissioned by the Isle of Man Government exposed critical failings in the permanent way, deeming it unsuitable for passenger service in the near future. The island's parliament, Tynwald, agreed to spend nearly £5 million for track replacement in July–September, allowing trams to run on a single track, according to a news report. Manx authorities were considering vintage buses as a replacement during the closure, reports previously stated. The resignation of the Tourism and Leisure Minister Adrian Earnshaw was called for by enthusiasts, and Chief Minister Tony Brown ordered an urgent review of the closure decision. He also ordered an independent inquiry into how the track had been allowed to get into such a state. In 2009, the full line operated continuously, and it has continued to do so during the summer season since the beginning of the 2010 season at Easter, except for COVID-related suspension, with no rail-related incidents affecting services. Until 1998, the line operated a year-round service, but since then it has run seasonally, usually between March and the beginning of November, though the dates can vary from season to season.

== Service and routing ==
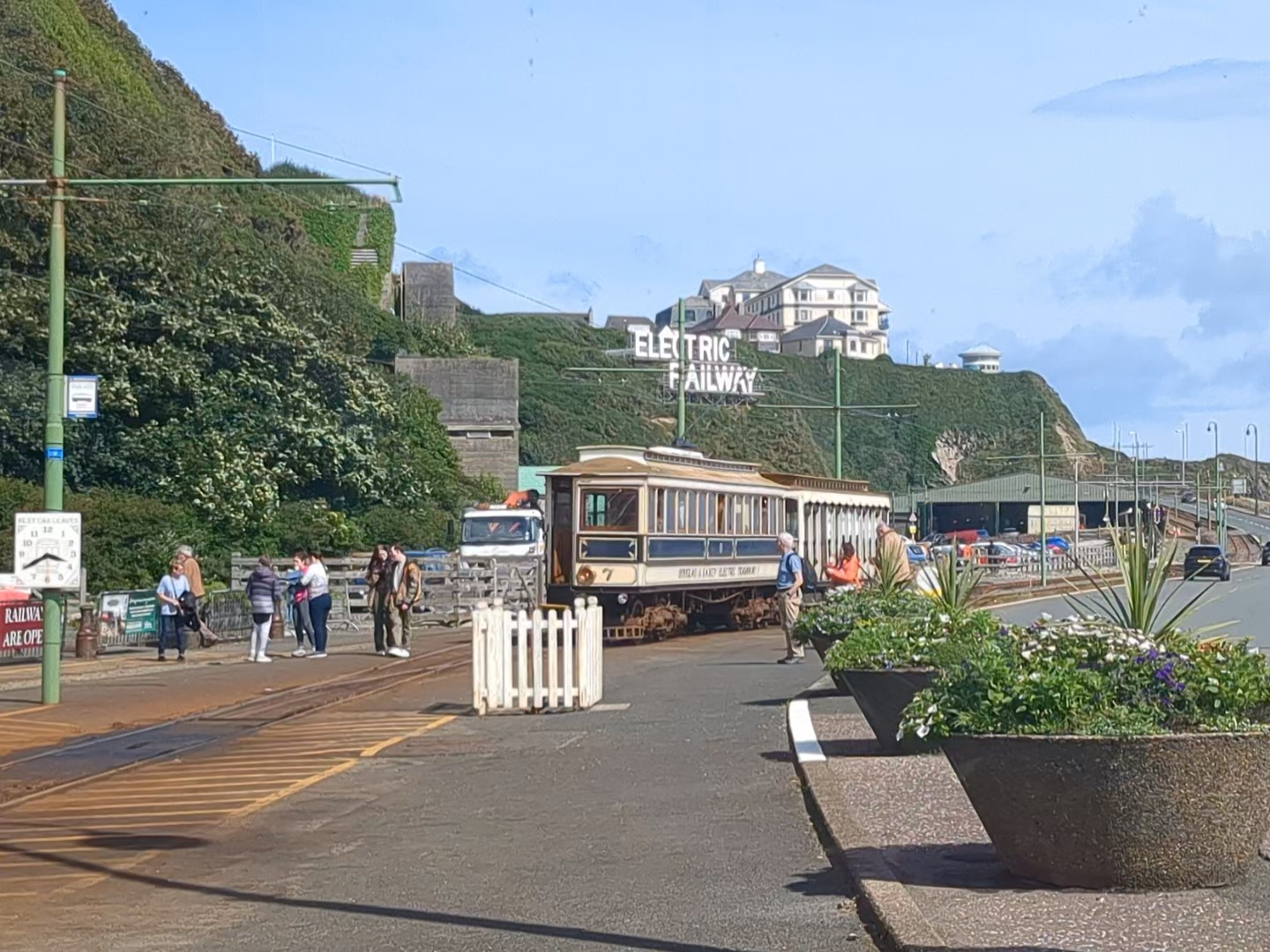
Derby Castle terminus, Douglas

The line runs on roadside reservation for the first few miles from Douglas and then on segregated track through the countryside for most of the route to Ramsey. However, there are a large number of level crossings, with the main A2 and with various minor roads. The line is 3 ft (914 mm) narrow gauge and is 17 miles (27.4 km) long. It is largely segregated from road traffic, running on double track on roadside reservation or private right-of-way, and is electrified using overhead lines at 550 volts direct current. Initially the trams used pairs of Hopkinson bow collectors (still used on the Snaefell Mountain Railway, owing to their dependability in strong winds on the mountain) but by the turn of the 20th century they were fitted with trolley poles, the method still employed. Originally the electricity was generated by the railway's own power stations, but now it comes via the island's national grid, run by the Manx Electricity Authority. Closure of the line during the winter has allowed substantial investment in infrastructure, including relaying longer stretches of track.

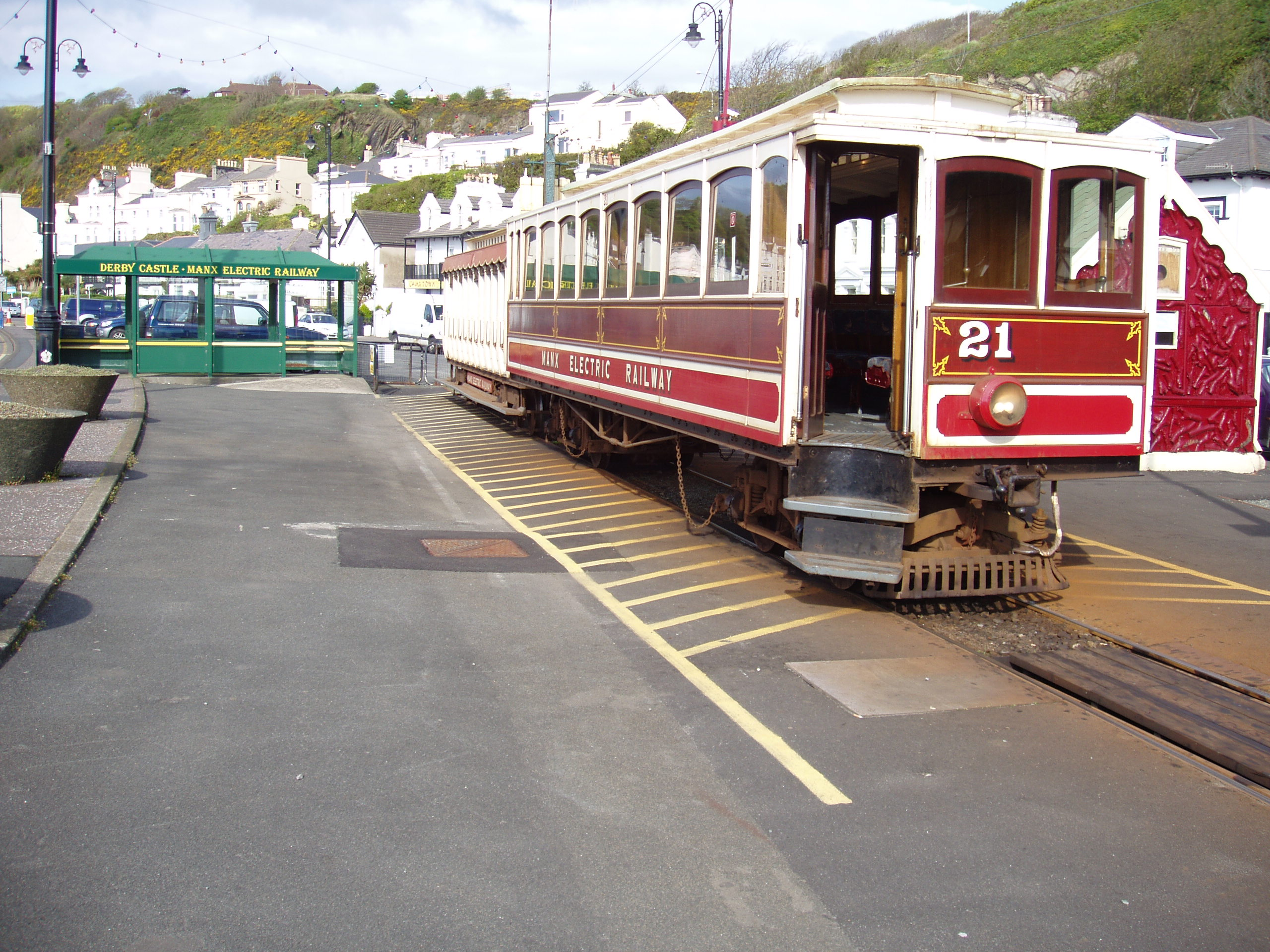
Winter Saloon No. 21, Derby Castle

Originally the service was provided by about 24 closed motor tramcars and the same number of open trailers: the earliest of these date from 1893 and almost all are pre-1910. Two of the three cars that opened the line in 1893 are still in use, and they are the oldest electric trams at work on their original line in the world. The design pre-dates any consensus on design, and they have distinctive boxy bodies. Most services are operated by a motor car towing a single trailer. The trailer is often removed in "inclement" weather. The later cars can haul two trailers. This has never been common practice (in recent years this has included in a few "special" services as part of the long-running series of events) although it was not uncommon for cars to haul a box-van for freight and, until 1975, a mail van. In September 1975 the line was closed between Laxey and Ramsey, but in 1977 the Ramsey section was reopened. From 1977 a limited winter service operated on weekdays, suspended in 1998 as an economy measure. The line operates a seasonal timetable with services from Douglas terminating at Laxey or Ramsey, with some short workings in connection with the Groudle Glen Railway in peak season, and limited evening operation as far as Laxey in peak season to tie in with evening services on the Snaefell Mountain Railway, which since 2009 has provided a weekly "Sunset Dinner" service including a meal at the summit. The possibility of a limited evening service to Ramsey has been considered in recent times, and trams are sometimes chartered during summer for enthusiasts' excursions.

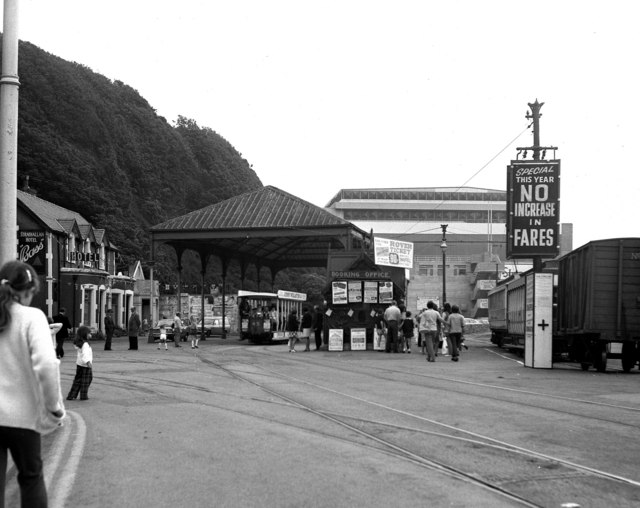
Derby Castle terminus, 1972

== Stations ==
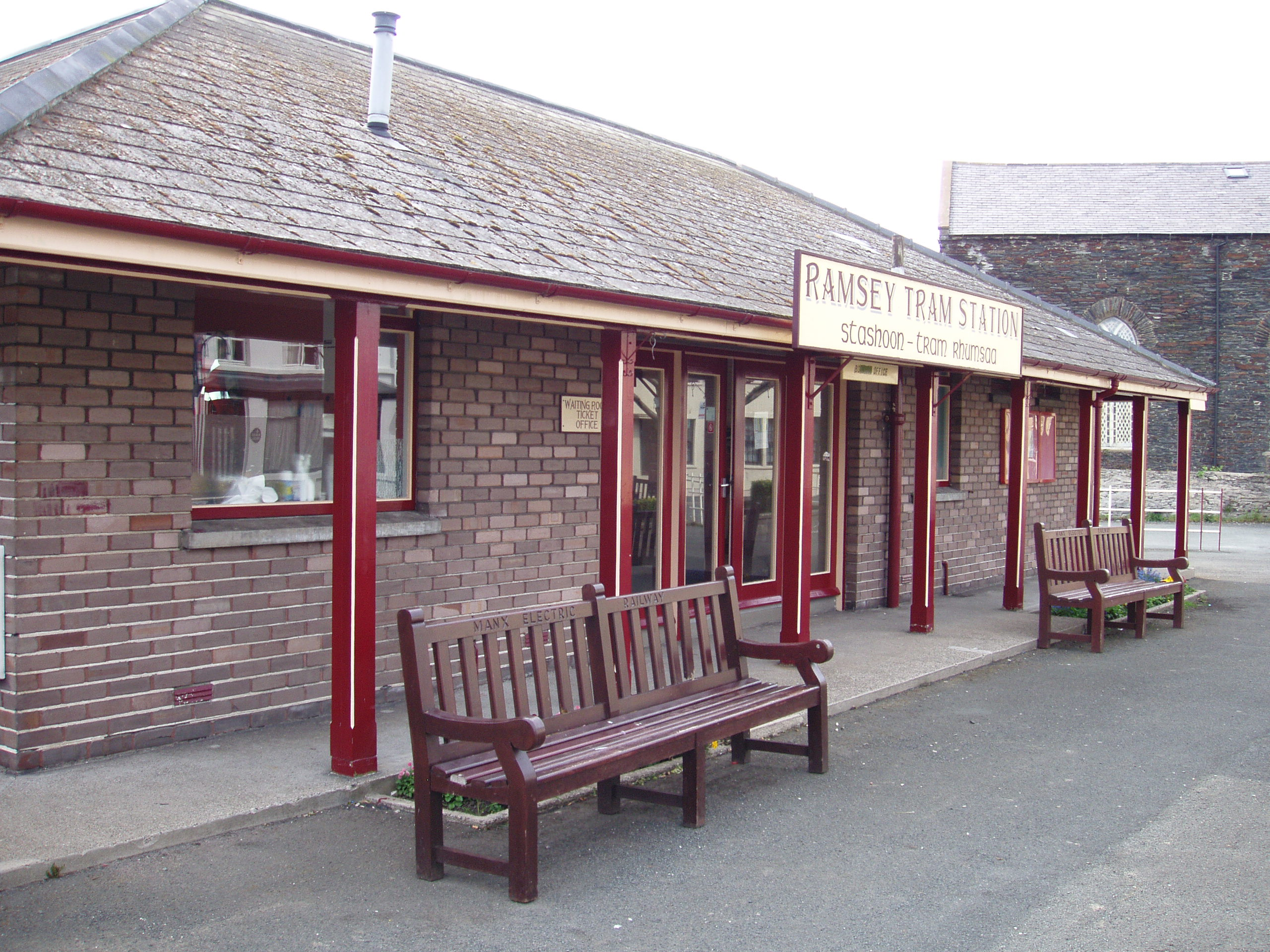
Ramsey Plaza railway station

There are several intermediate stations, with Groudle Glen, Laxey, Dhoon Glen, Cornaa and Ballaglass Glen shown in timetables. The official stopping points usually have a basic waiting shelter (more recent additions have been modern bus shelters), and there are "unofficial" stopping points that sometimes have "request stop" notices but not nameboards or other passenger facilities. Several in the more rural areas have the name of the nearby farm or farmer; these are most prevalent in the northern section with names such as Rome's Crossing, Watson's Crossing and Browns Crossing, but none of these has carried its name. Some stopping points are known by their nearest pole number, numbered 1 to 903 from Derby Castle to Ramsey. Trams stop within reason at main stations Derby Castle, Laxey and Ramsey alongside many request stops where you will need to give a clear signal to the driver to stop. A list of the current stops on the Manx Electric Railway as of 2026 can be found HERE. A proportion of the railway runs along side the roads. These sections were originally toll roads, built at the same time as the line.

== Tramcars and trailers ==
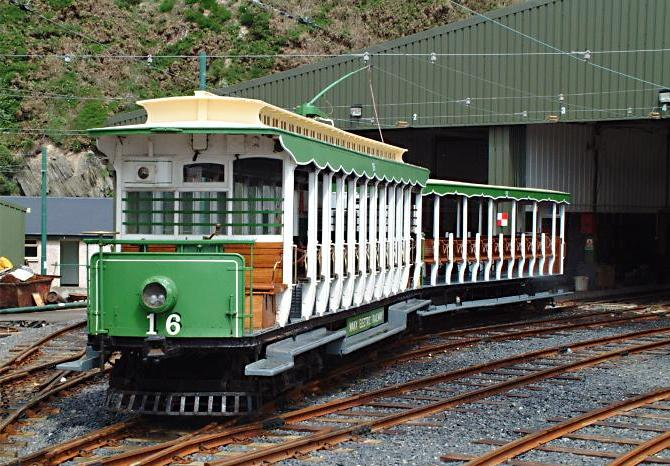
"Paddlebox" Car No. 16 of 1898 at Derby Castle Car Shed

The line is in many ways unique, not least because it still operates entirely with its original rolling stock, except for winter saloon 22, which was completely rebuilt after a fire in 1990 which made the bodywork unusable. A considerable amount of stock was lost in a disastrous fire at Laxey in 1930, but other than this all of the original stock remains. In recent times the storage of excess stock has become something of a political "hot potato": several vehicles were stored off-site; they all returned to on-site storage in November 2009, requiring considerable attention before returning to traffic in many cases. The line belongs to the Isle of Man Government, formerly as part of the Department of Community, Culture & Leisure, which does not see the requirement to retain unused stock that has no potential use or long-term storage place on the railway. The line purchased a Lisbon tram in 1999, but this has never seen use due to clearance difficulties (it was used as a passenger waiting shelter for a spell). It is no longer on the railway, but remains on the island.

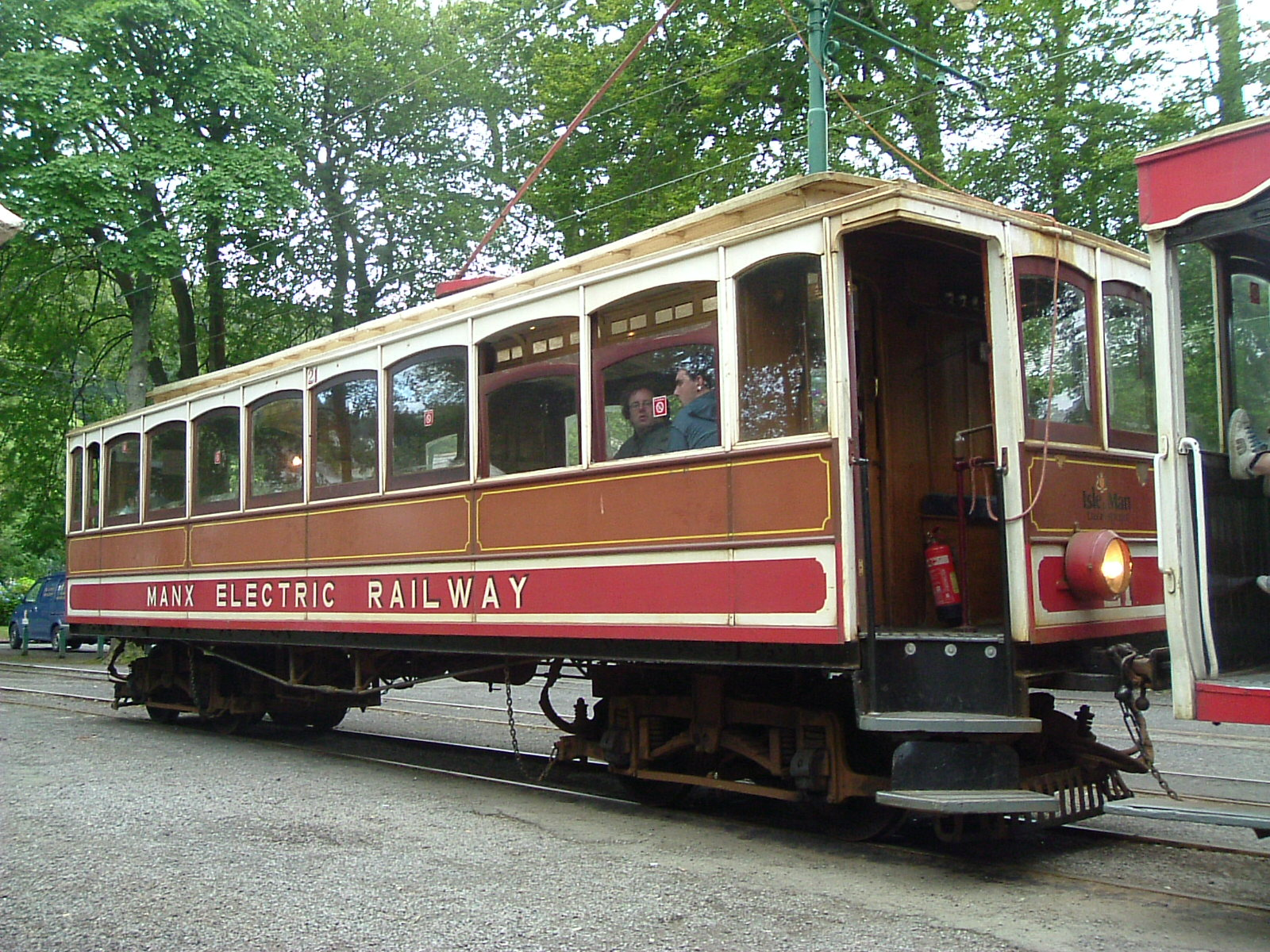
Winter Saloon No. 21 of 1899, Laxey railway station

The following trams were in passenger service in the 2010 season, with the mainstay of the services being winter saloons or tunnel cars. Original tramcars 1 and 2 are both operational but are not usually in day-to-day use, tunnel cars 5 and 6 see use in peak summer season and illuminated car 9 (also a member of this class) is used in conjunction with the evening services on the Groudle Glen Railway in July and August. Winter saloons 19–22 operate the core timetable. There are serviceable open toastracks, numbers 26, 32 and 33 (the last two being the most powerful on the line). Many other cars remain in the railway's possession but out of service and in some cases off-site. Trailers used include lightweight trailers 37 and 49, bulkheads 40–48 which usually accompany the winter saloons, lightweight trailer 51, converted disabled saloon 56, closed saloons 57 and 58 and 61–62. The Royal Saloon, No. 59, makes rare public appearances. As part of the annual transport festival car 32 occasionally operates a special evening service hauling two trailers, an unusual occurrence despite the later cars being built with the capability to operate in this way. Car 7 was relegated to permanent way duties for a number of years but was restored for return to traffic in 2011. Locomotive 23 is privately owned; car 34 (previously No. 7 Maria on the Snaefell Mountain Railway and regauged) is undergoing maintenance, and other cars receive remedial attention as and when time and funding allows.

Throughout its history, the MER has had a total of 34 motor cars, of which 27 survive today in some shape or form. The history of the unpowered half of the MER's passenger vehicle fleet is complicated, as there have been withdrawals, scrappings, replacements, conversions and several renumberings.

The motors are numbered mainly in order of construction; however, this does not apply to the trailers: these have always followed on from the highest numbered motor. This changed several times between 1893 and 1906, and some trailers have carried several numbers as they were renumbered almost yearly to allow for new arrivals. Some were even converted into motors.

== Wagons ==
The history of the freight carrying wagons and vans of the Manx Electric Railway is complicated and varied, from an initial start with only four wagons, to the heyday in the 1920s–1930s, to the current modern-day situation where only a handful are in serviceable condition.

== Permanent way ==
Since its opening, there has been a varying level of commitment to keeping the line in serviceable condition. A great variety of stock has been either bought in or converted from previous examples, some gaining a more unlikely use than others.

== Visitors ==
There have been many visiting examples of traction and stock to the Manx Electric Railway throughout its history, some used in the original construction of the line, others for special events and centenaries.

== Incidents ==
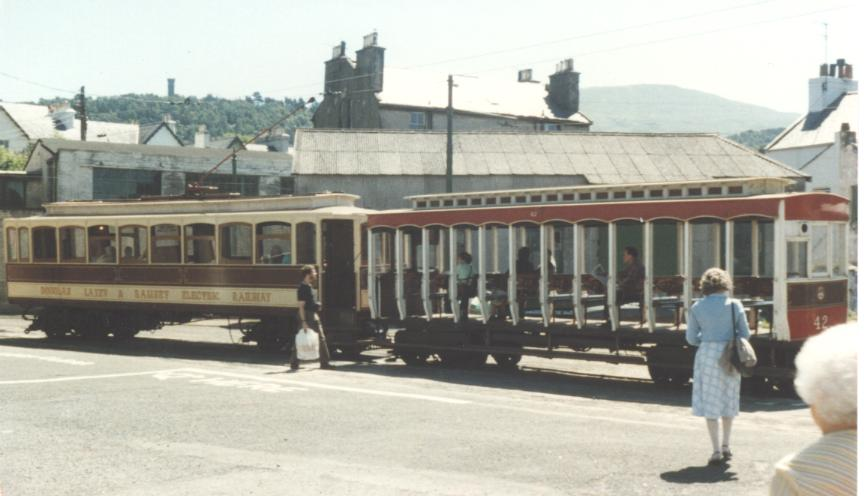
Winter Saloon No. 21 of 1899, Ramsey Plaza

Owing to the number of open and ungated level crossings there are minor collisions, and these are reported in the local press. These have become more commonplace but are usually minor; warning signage to alert motorists that trams are operating has been erected at the start of each season in recent times, but incidents still occur. There are many occupation crossings, some with restricted visibility for motorists. One such incident took place on Monday, 27 July 2009, when a vehicle carrying a mechanical excavator came into contact with the overhead wires supplying power to both the line and the Snaefell Mountain Railway at a busy road crossing in Laxey; there were no injuries. Police and the line's electrical engineering crews attended the scene, the report also said. It did not indicate what damage had occurred. Service resumed the next day after temporary repairs to the overhead lines, which were permanently repaired over the subsequent couple of weeks. An investigation into the incident was scheduled to take place later.

About 70 metres of copper overhead wire were stolen between late January and 14 February 2012 between Laxey and Ramsey. Police recovered the stolen material.

On 7 July 2015, trailer 58 suffered a serious derailment on a relatively new crossover just north of Laxey Station, toppling onto its side. Services were suspended between Laxey and Ramsey. A complex operation was undertaken to lift the trailer back upright. It required a road closure, removal of overhead line equipment and a large crane. The re-railed trailer was then moved by tractor to Laxey Station and has since returned to service after overhaul.

== See also ==
- British narrow-gauge railways
- Heritage railways in the Isle of Man
- Maley & Taunton
- Transport in the Isle of Man
- List of tram and light rail transit systems
- List of Manx Electric Railway stations

== Sources ==
- Goodwyn, A.M. (1976) Is This Any Way To Run A Railway ? – The story of the Manx Electric Railway since 1956., Manx Electric Railway Society website, accessed 24 November 2006
- Goodwyn, M., (1993) Manx Electric, Platform 5 Publishing, ISBN 1-872524-52-4
- Heavyside, Tom (2010). Douglas – Laxey – Ramsey: including the Groudle Glen Railway. Narrow Gauge Branch Lines series. Midhurst, West Sussex, UK: Middleton Press. ISBN 9781906008758.
- Hendry, R., (1993), Rails in the Isle of Man: A colour celebration, Midland Publishing Limited, ISBN 1-85780-009-5
