= Ramsey railway station (Manx Electric Railway) =

Railway station in Isle of Man

Ramsey Rhumsaa
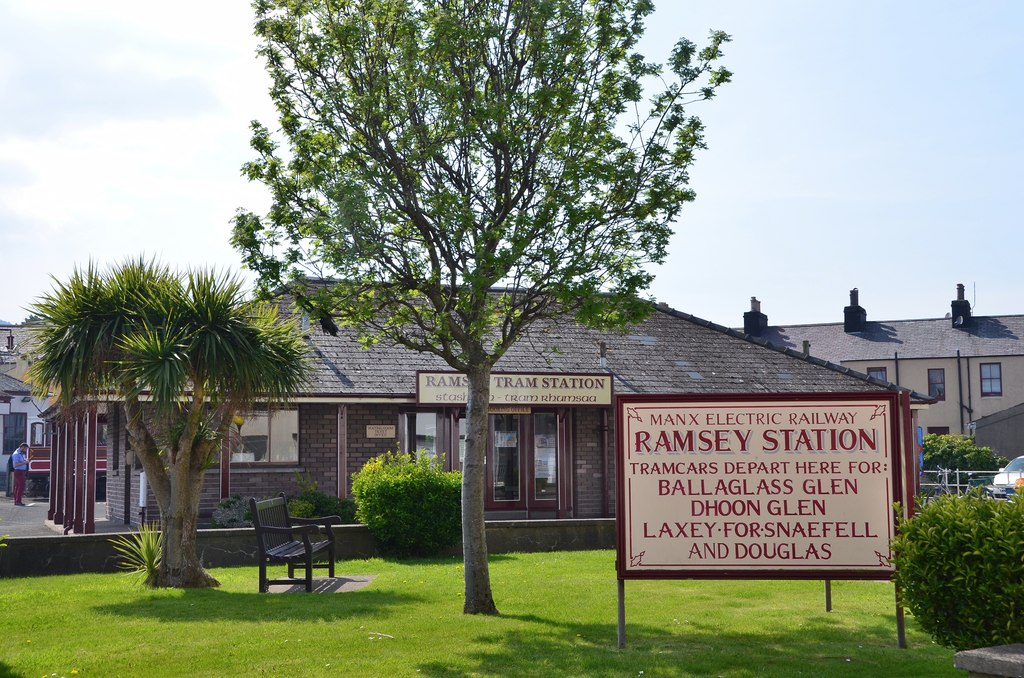
- The tram station from the street side

General information
- Location: Ramsey, Isle Of Man
- Coordinates: 54.32063°N 4.38177°W
- Pole Nos.: 1,090-1,094
- System: Manx Electric Railway
- Owner: Isle Of Man Heritage Railways
- Platforms: Two Ground Level
- Tracks: Running Lines, Sidings & Shed Lines

Construction
- Structure type: Waiting Room (Incl. Office & Toilets)
- Parking: Dedicated, In Station
- Cycle facilities: Available

History
- Opened: 1899
- Rebuilt: 1964
- Former names: Manx Electric Railway Co., Ltd.
Location

Ramsey Station (Manx: Stashoon Raad Yiarn Rhumsaa) serves the town of Ramsey in the Isle of Man; it is the northern terminus of the Manx Electric Railway. It was formerly known as Ramsey (Plaza) Station after the nearby Plaza cinema, now demolished and turned into a car park. Today it is often also known as Ramsey Tram Station and signage to this effect adorns the station, despite the line being described as a railway. It should not be confused with Ramsey's former station on the Isle of Man Railway.

== Beginnings ==
The station is in the heart of the town, and originally consisted of a simple lean-to shelter incorporating a booking hall with nearby stalls similar to that seen today at Laxey Station; but the area has been subject to changes over many years. The site was mostly cleared and the station facilities were located within the Plaza Building for some time. Also on the site was a timber construction which located the town's Citizens Advice Bureau for a number of years.

== Buildings ==
Today's terminus building was erected in 1964 and houses the station master's office, a waiting area and passenger toilets. Prior to this the station staff occupied various locations, most notably an office within the now-demolished cinema from which the station gains its name. Directly opposite the passenger area lies the former goods shed which has served a number of purposes in recent years. Used to house goods stock for many years, it was changed into a small museum housing the "Royal Trailer" No. 59 for some years, before being converted to its current use as "The Shed", a youth club. It remains rail connected. Unusually for M.E.R. stations, the traction poles are painted maroon to match the colour scheme of the station; elsewhere on the line they are all painted in the standard deep green colour. At the end of the yard lies the large car shed used to house service cars overnight. This shed was used for a period as another tramway museum and operated by the Isle Of Man Railway Society and housed three tramcars from the Douglas Bay Horse Tramway as well as several other unusual items of rolling stock such as the locomotive and carriage from the tramway that operated on Queen's Pier in the town. Upon closure the exhibits were relocated and the shed returned to its original use.

== Operation ==
The track layout within the station does not allow for the usual method of running the motor car round the trailer ready for the return journey. Instead the trailer car is detached from the motor car, and the motor car crosses over to the opposing track. The trailer is then allowed to roll down under gravity to the end of the line, where the motor car will reverse back onto it and be coupled up again. In October 2016 a temporary station was opened on the opposite side of the road and the track in the old station was only used for occasional carriage storage. In 2024 regular passenger trains were extended to the original station and the temporary station was closed.

== Route ==
Preceding station	Manx Electric Railway	Following station
Ballastowell towards Derby Castle	Douglas–Ramsey	Terminus

== Gallery ==
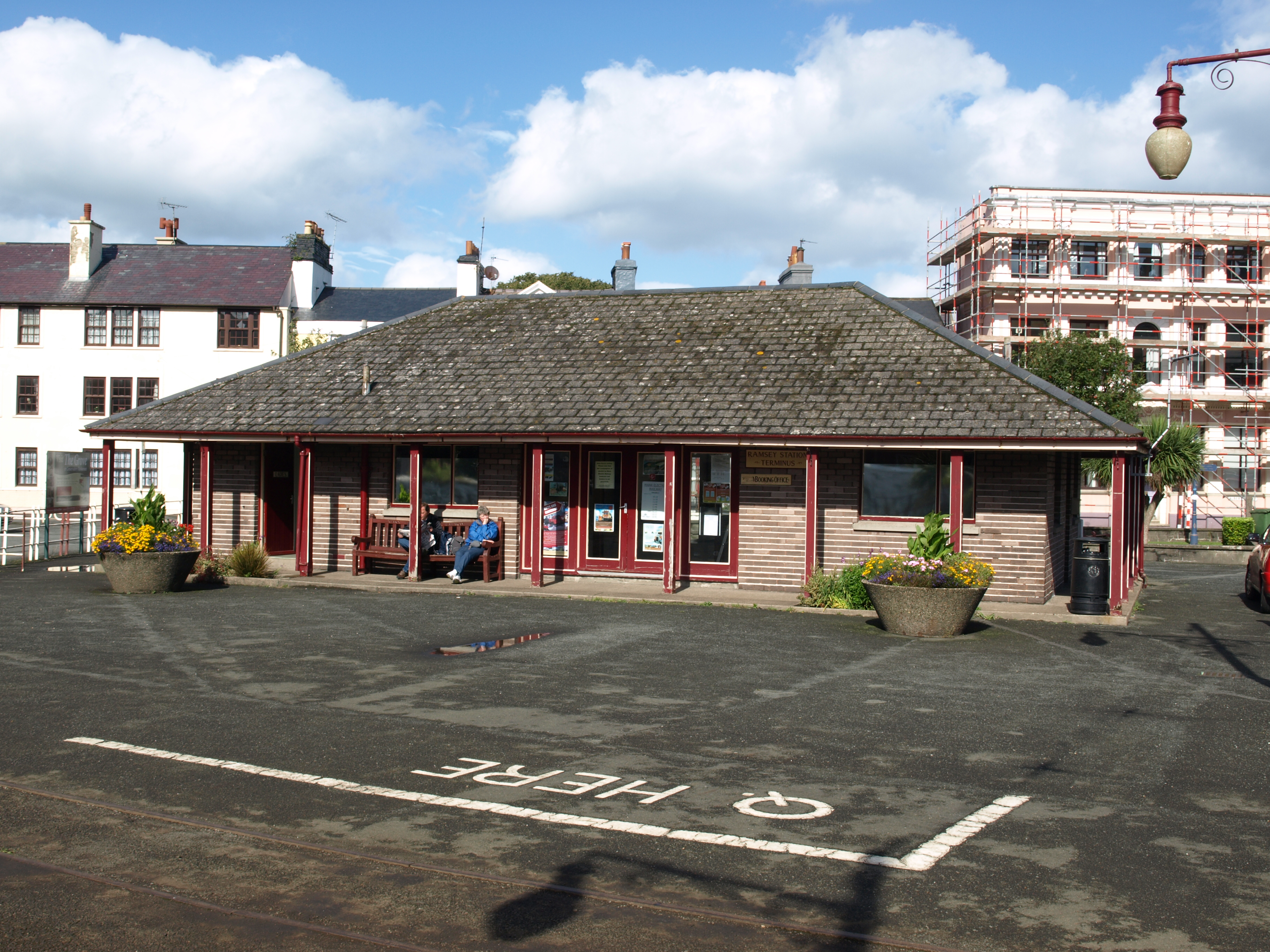
The tram station from the track side

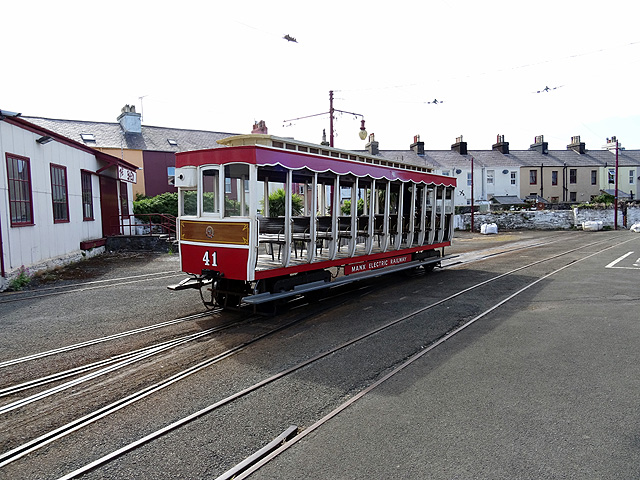
Trailer car 41 in the station tracks

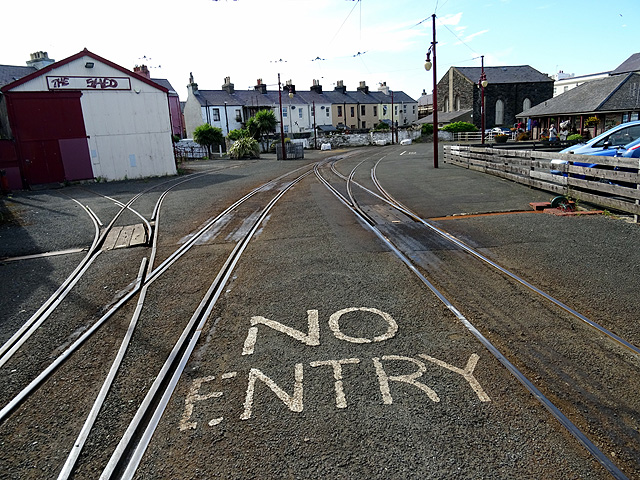
The track layout in the station, with the old goods shed (The Shed)

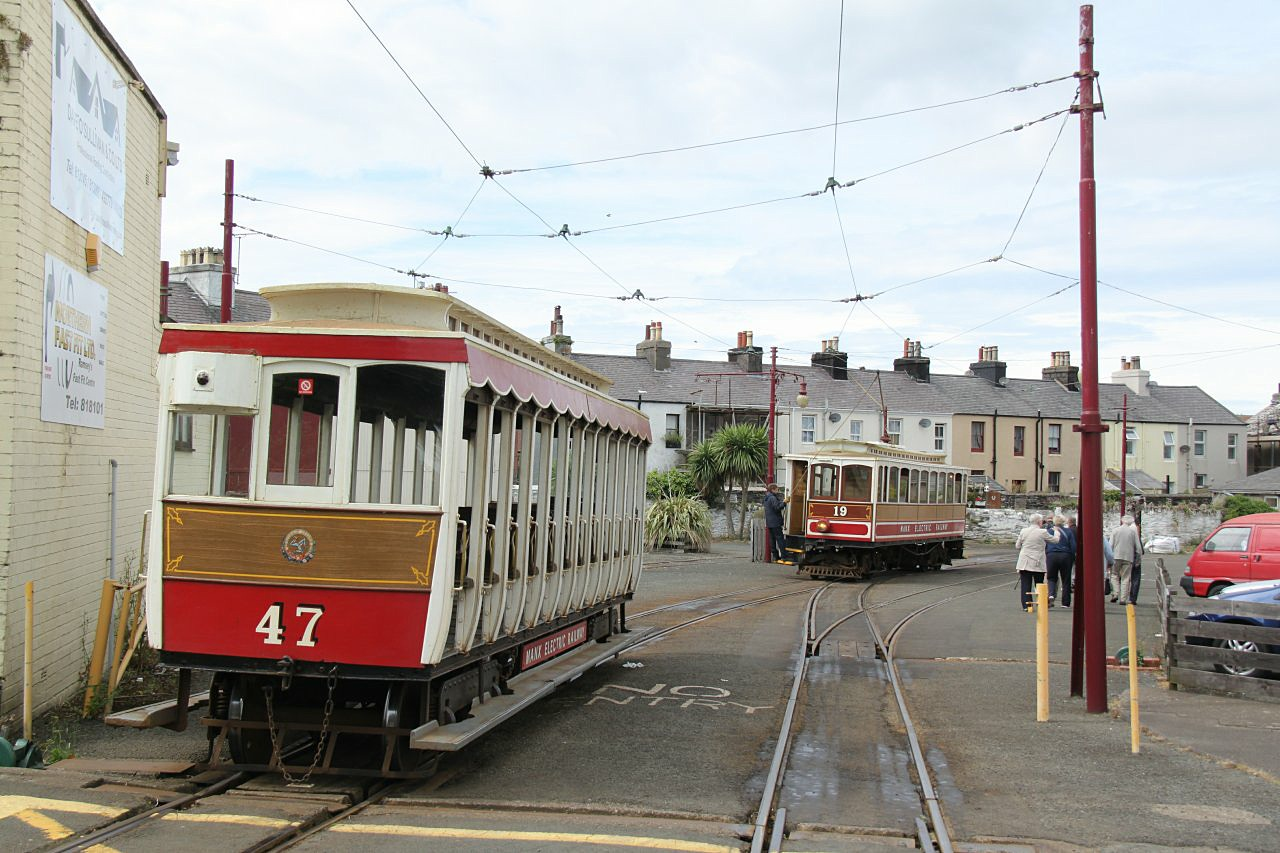
Preparing to run round the trailer using a gravity shunt

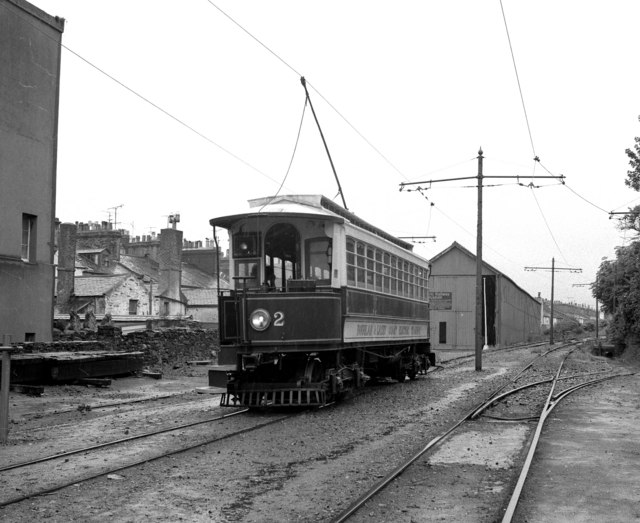
Looking south from the station in 1982, showing car 2 and the car shed

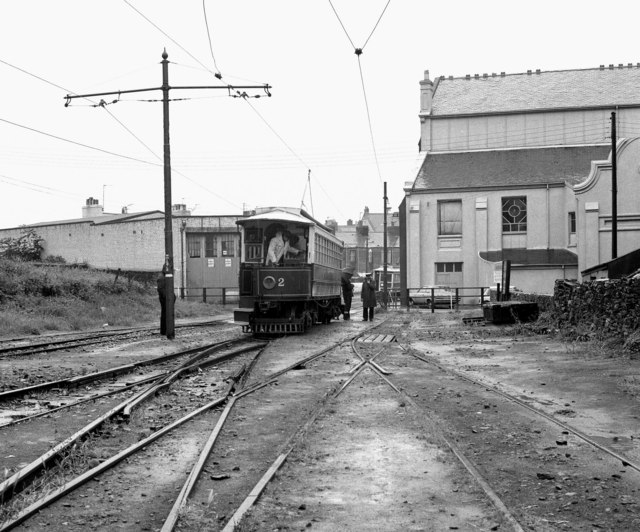
View the other way, past the Plaza cinema to the station

== See also ==
- Manx Electric Railway Stations

== Sources ==
- Manx Electric Railway Stopping Places (2002) Manx Electric Railway Society
- Island Images: Manx Electric Railway Pages (2003) Jon Wornham
- Official Tourist Department Page (2009) Isle Of Man Heritage Railways
