= Derby Castle terminus =

Railway station in Isle of Man, the UK

Derby Castle Cashtal Derby
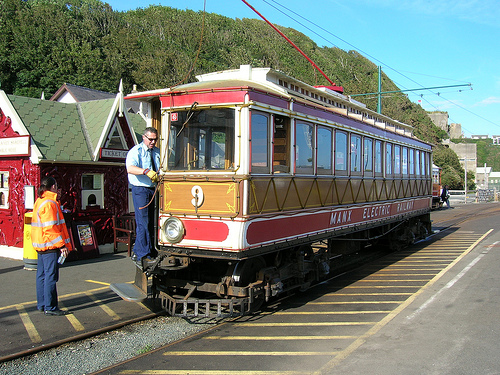

General information
- Location: Queens Promenade; Douglas, Isle Of Man
- Coordinates: 54°10′01″N 4°27′39″W
- Pole No.: 001-004
- System: The Manx Electric Railway Co., Ltd.
- Owner: Isle of Man Government; Department of Infrastructure
- Tracks: 2 Running Lines "Groudle Siding"

Construction
- Structure type: Booking Office; Waiting Shelter
- Parking: Roadside

History
- Opened: 1893
Location

Derby Castle Terminus (Manx: Kione Stashoon Chashtal Derby) is the southern terminus of the Manx Electric Railway. It is located on the north side of Douglas, Isle of Man; Douglas Station on the Isle of Man Railway is located on the south side of town, with the MER station being termed "Derby Castle" to differentiate between the two.

== History ==
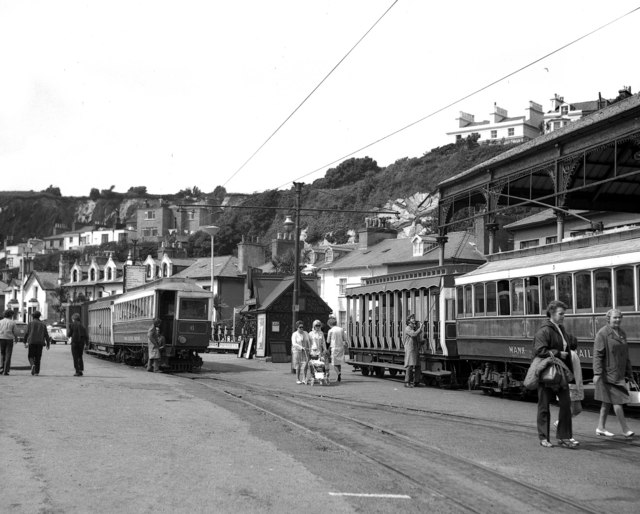
The station site in 1971 showing the Great Canopy to the right and two tunnel cars and their trailers, the one on the right being on the "Groudle Siding" which remains in situ today.

The site that now forms the station at Derby Castle is so called because the area to the north at that time housed the vast entertainment complex of the same name. The enterprising railway, initially titled the Isle of Man Tramways & Electric Power Company, owned the entire site, including the row of houses at Strathallan Crescent and the horse tram sheds and offices above. Behind this building lay the Calvary Glen which too was the property of the company until 1934. This area has been the terminus of the line since it opened in 1893. Atit opened in 1893 the northerly end of the site was the main entrance to the ballroom complex, and later the car park for the now-demolished Summerland complex complete in 1968 following the demolition of the original complex; the Aquadrome swimming pool and sauna which was part of the same development was added later. Above the site, now the tramway depot, was developed in 1893 by filling in Port-E-Vada creek to create this reclaimed land for the depot, at the northern end of the promenade. This was the site of the power station to generate the required current to run the trams, and also served the first electric lamp standards on the island from 1897 in the nearby village of Onchan. Today the power station building remains at the nearby depot though long since used for other maintenance purposes by the tramway.

== Structures ==
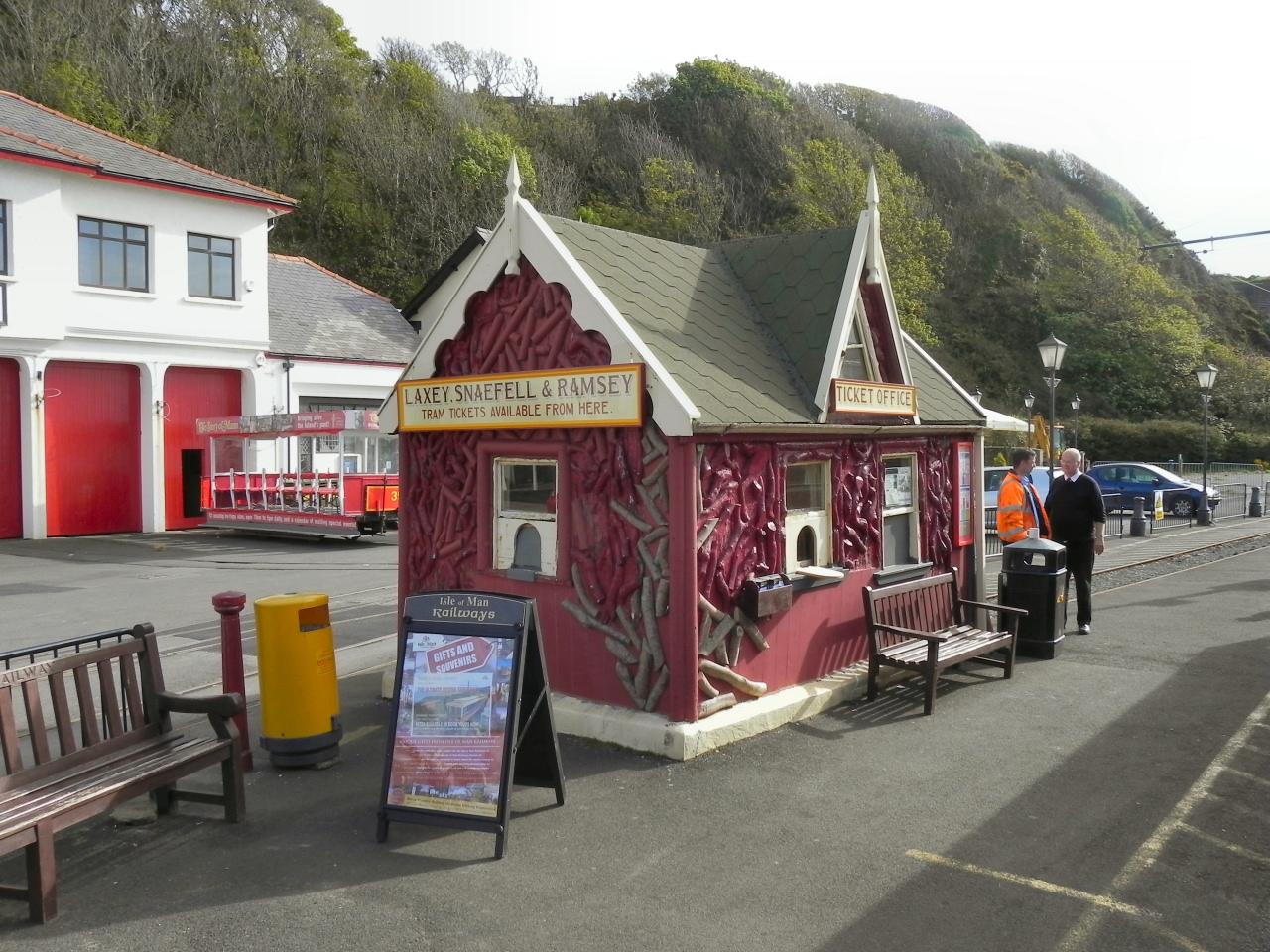
The original booking office which remains extant today.

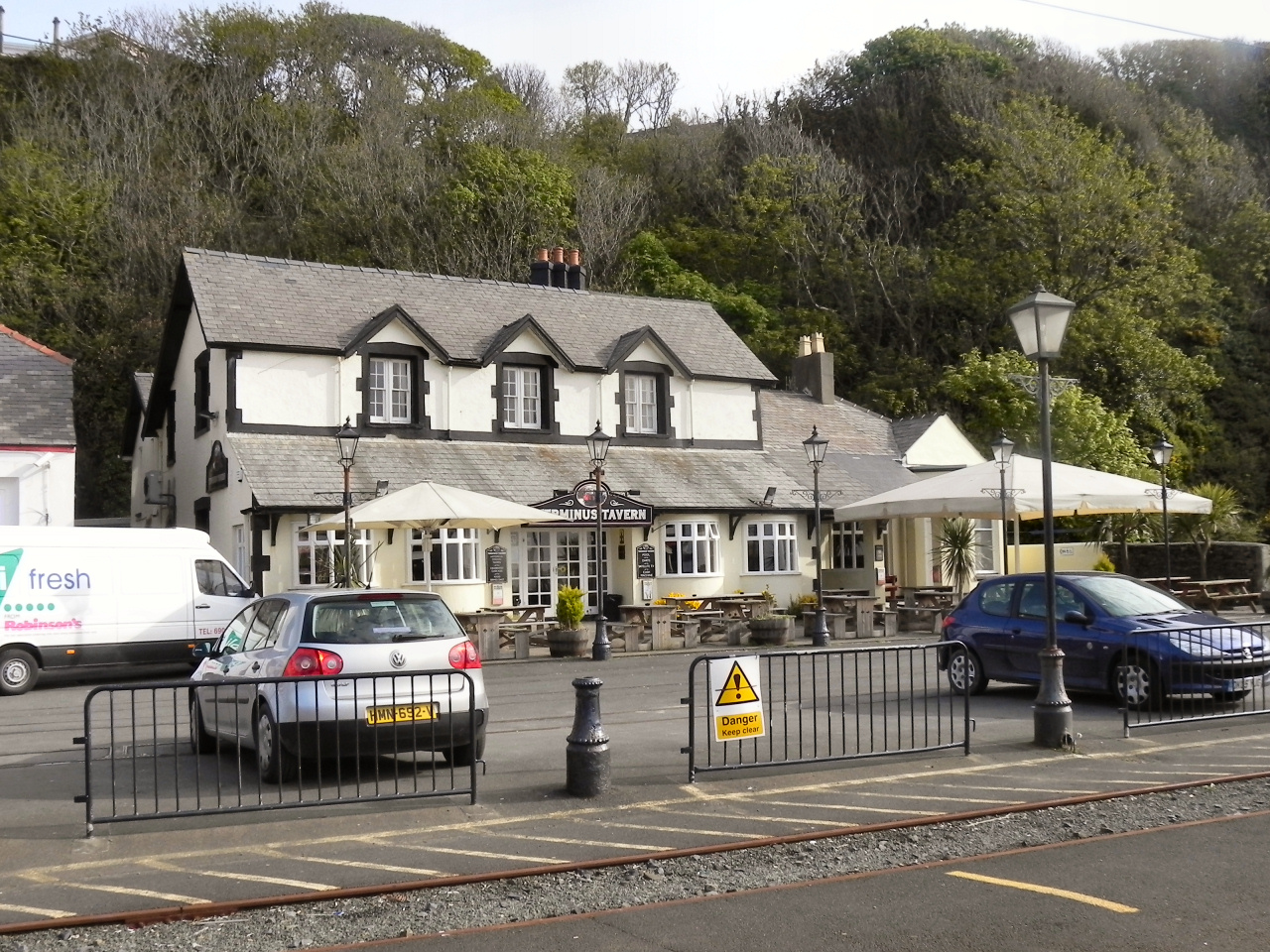
Built as the Strathallan Lodge, now titled the Terminus Tavern.

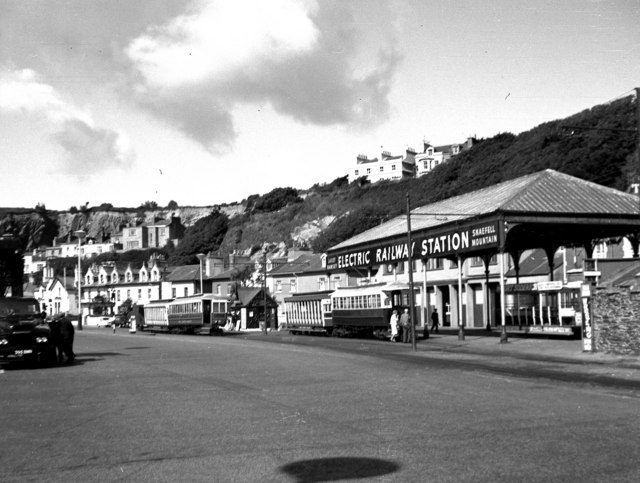
"Great Canopy" with its later simplified roof .

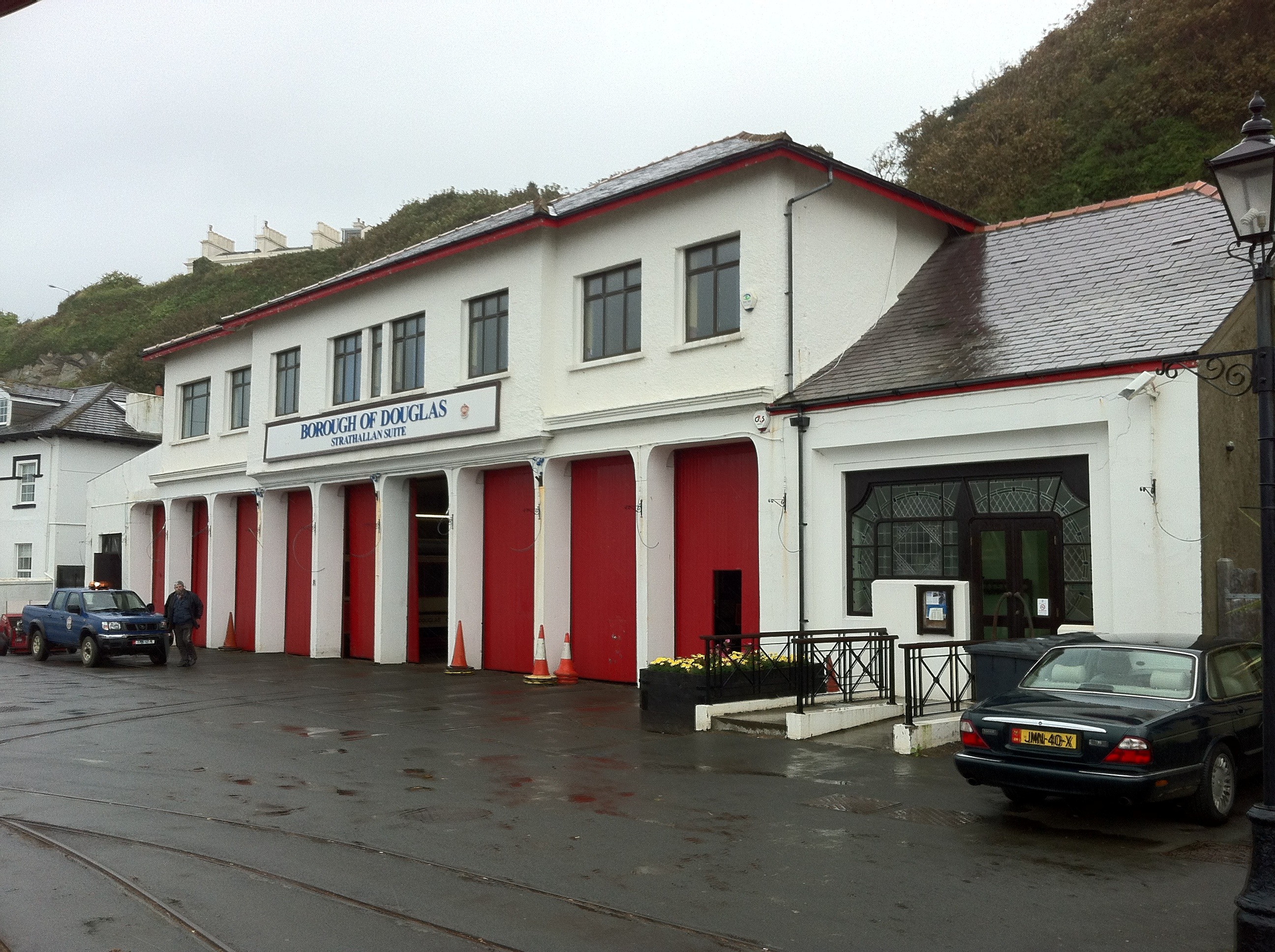
Tramway Headquarters prior to demolition and replacement.

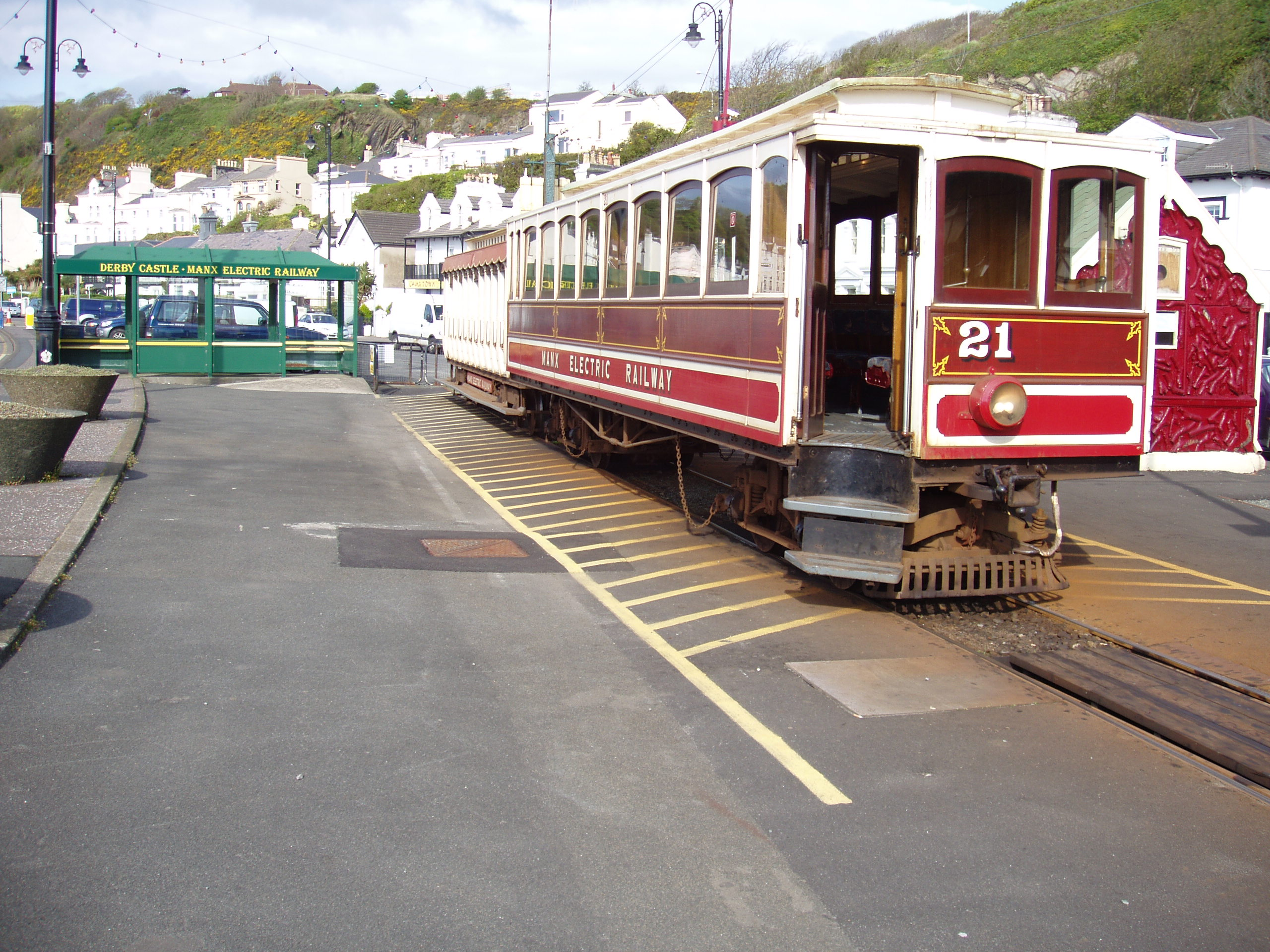
Modern shelter servings both the trams and buses adjacent.

=== Booking Office ===
The station still retains the original station booking office dating from 1897, built in a distinctive "rustic" style with half-log cladding, and steep alpine roofing. The facilities are basic and the office measures only 12' 6" by 8' (3.8 m by 2.4 m) and has room for station master and crew only; the station has never had its own toilets for instance, sharing facilities with the nearby Strathallan Hotel (latterly renamed "Terminus Tavern" as it is next to the electric and horse tram termini). Aside from the tarmacadam surfacing and modern shelter, the site remains unchanged since opening. Since the development of the new tramway headquarters, offices and booking office to the rear in 2019 the hut has seen use only as a crew room for staff. There is a loop of track to allow the motor car to be shunted around the trailer car.

=== Strathallan ===
The public house next to the station, which is now called the "Terminus Tavern", was built in 1890 as the Strathallan Lodge, later becoming a hostelry and remained so until 1982 when it was given its current name. It was railway-owned until nationalisation in 1957, having been taken over by the local brewery at that time. It still forms an integral part of the station, the walls being lined with numerous photographs of the line and other handbills, posters, etc., and it still plays host to off-duty railway workers today. Next to it is the modern replacement horse tram depot of the same name (the original, owned by Douglas Corporation who operated the horse tramways having latterly been the Strathallan Suite of offices and seminary rooms; this was demolished to make way for the current premises built in a similar style in 2019. Beyond that Strathallan Terrace of houses, one of which was the registered office of the tramway when built. The houses of the crescent were sold off in 1978 when the entire railway network became government owned, and the railway's offices took up residence in the building above the horse tram sheds at this time also. This office is now in the ownership of the local authority and renamed the "Strathallan Suite". Today is houses a Chinese restaurant and a number of private dwellings.

=== Canopy ===
From the turn of the twentieth century there was a large open roof known as the "Great Canopy". The stanchions for this canopy are now used as flagpoles and/or lampposts, and it can clearly be seen where the canopy was. The canopy, although erected by the railway, provided cover for the tramcars of the Douglas Bay Horse Tramway which also terminates here; the canopy originally featured detailed and intricate metalwork culminating in a central clock tower, distinctive on many early views, but latterly this was removed and a plain roof replaced it. It also formed a shelter beside the main pedestrian entrance to the Derby Castle complex, demolished in 1965 to make way for the ill-fated Summerland leisure centre. It was demolished in 1979 having been deemed unsafe and beyond practical repair, leaving no shelter for passengers for several years. At one time it was common to park a spare tramcar on the "Groudle Siding" for shelter, and later a decommissioned Leyland National bus served this role as well as a second hand Lisbon tram.

=== Other ===
In 1999 a long shelter was added, with a sign to say it was for use in connection with both the electric railway and bus services. Previously a defunct tramcar purchased from Lisbon, Portugal was housed on the siding to the side of the station, and this functioned as a waiting area until it was removed for off-site storage some time later, and now the station offers no cover for waiting passengers other than the incongruous modern shelter. For a short time in the 1980s, a horse car from the horse tramway was used as a shelter. A temporary shelter was erected in which to house horse trams during redevelopment of the site 2018-2019 and removed upon completion of works.

=== Features ===
The station is well known for its many and varied advertising signages, with many any varied styles in evidence denoting "The Highspot Of Your Holiday" in connection with a trip on the Snaefell Mountain Railway and "Shining By The Sea" for Royal Ramsey among the posters. The station is always covered with informative signage. A framed manually operated clock face attached to a traction pole shows the time of the next departure. For the line's centenary in 1993 large planters were added to the site.

== Route ==
Preceding station	Manx Electric Railway	Following station
Terminus	Douglas–Ramsey	Port Jack towards Ramsey Station
