= Groudle Glen railway station =

Railway station in Isle of Man, the UK

Groudle Glen Glion Ghroudal
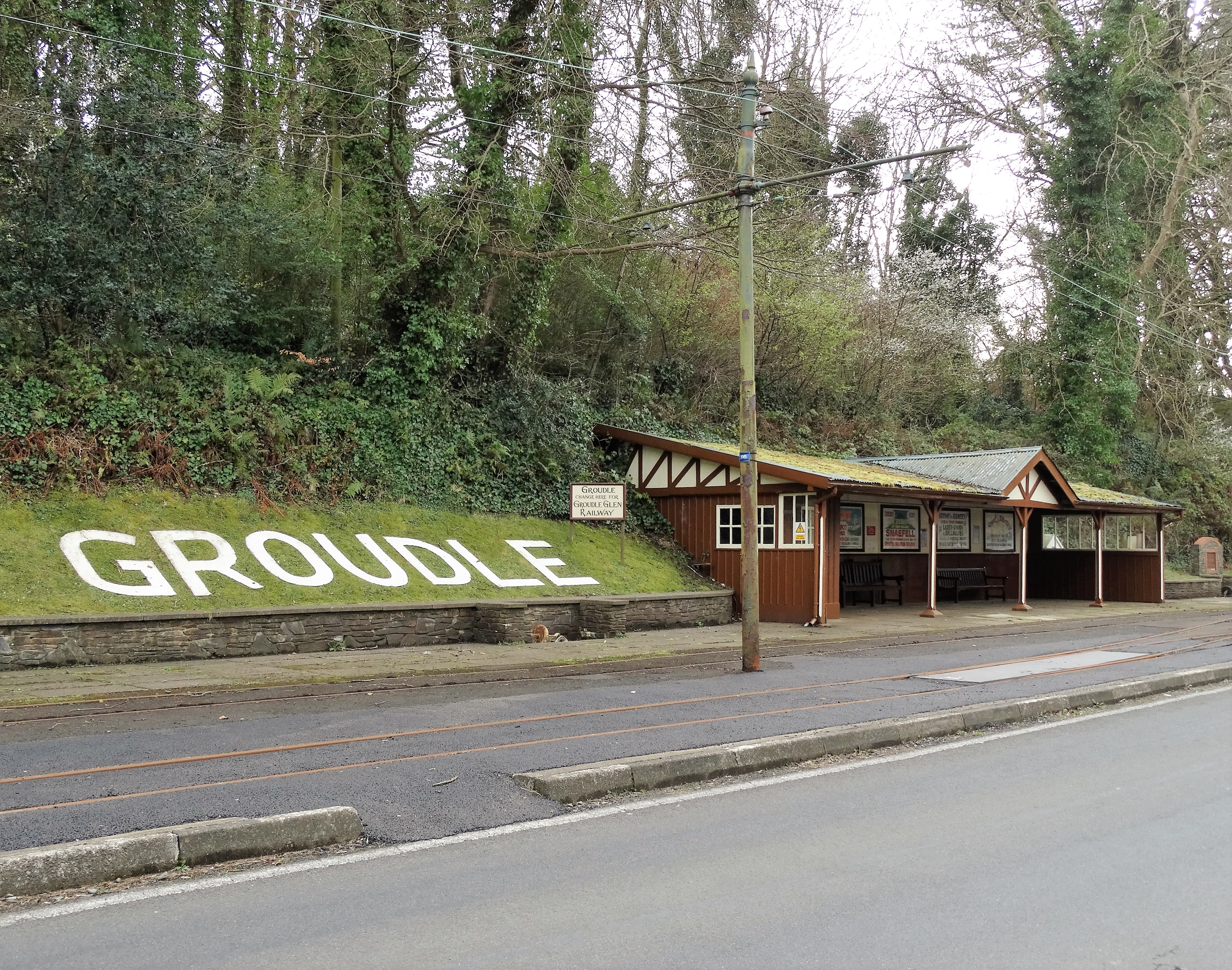

General information
- Location: King Edward Road; Groudle, Isle of Man
- Coordinates: 54°10′39″N 4°25′51″W
- Pole Nos.: 116-117
- System: The Manx Electric Railway Co., Ltd.
- Owner: Manx Electric Railway; Isle of Man Government
- Tracks: Running Line & Crossover

Construction
- Structure type: Open Shelter

History
- Opened: 1893
Location

Groudle Glen station (Manx: Stashoon Raad Yiarn Ghlion Ghroudal) is the first mandatory stopping point and major station on the Manx Electric Railway which serves the village of Groudle Glen in the Isle of Man, and is situated between Groudle Lane and Eskadale on the route to Laxey and Ramsey.

== History ==
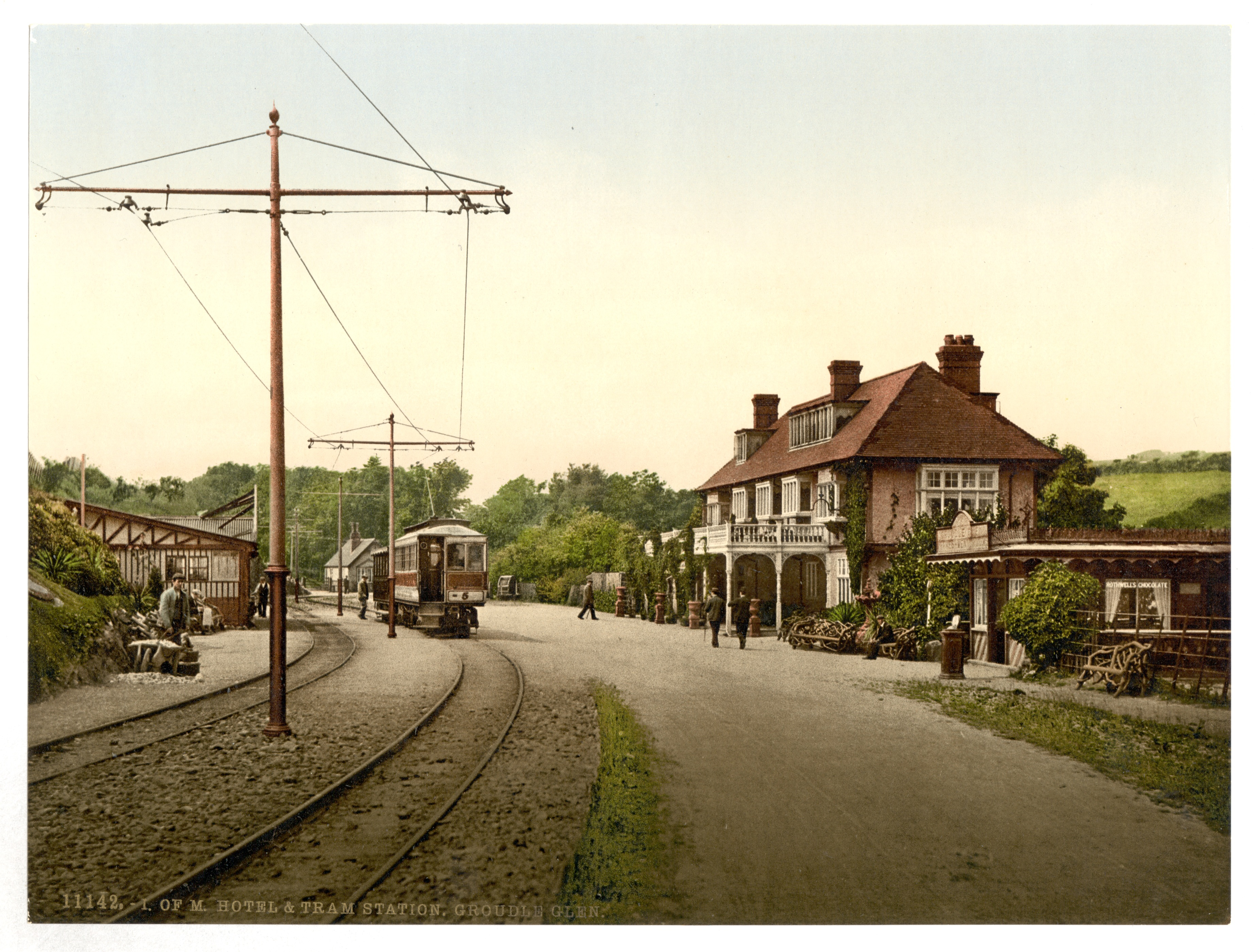
An early view of the station with Groudle Glen Hotel opposite and the station itself on the left with one of the tunnel cars at the stop, prior to the establishment of the trees; Dobie's refreshment rooms can also be seen on the far right.

The station was the first terminus of the line in 1893, the following year an extension was opened as far as Laxey and the station became an intermediate one. The building that still occupies the site, consisting of a large open waiting shelter incorporating small ticket office in one corner, dates from the beginning of the railway, but has been unstaffed for many years save for occasional special events. Despite its somewhat basic appearance and lack of facilities, the station was one of the most popular on the line, serving the glen which operated as pleasure grounds, the adjacent hotel and nearby narrow gauge railway. The hill figure next to it reading "GROUDLE" was placed next to the shelter in 1993 for the centenary celebrations, a similar sign featured on the opposite hillside prior to the growth of trees planted for the glen's opening. The site is illuminated for evening service by two lamps affixed to the traction poles of the railway, unusually in brown to match the station rather than traditional green. One of the tramway's electrical sub-stations is a short distance from the stop just prior to the curve which leads to Groudle Viaduct. Beside what is now the entrance to the glen once stood Dobie's refreshment room, the site is now occupied by a private dwelling.

== Postbox ==
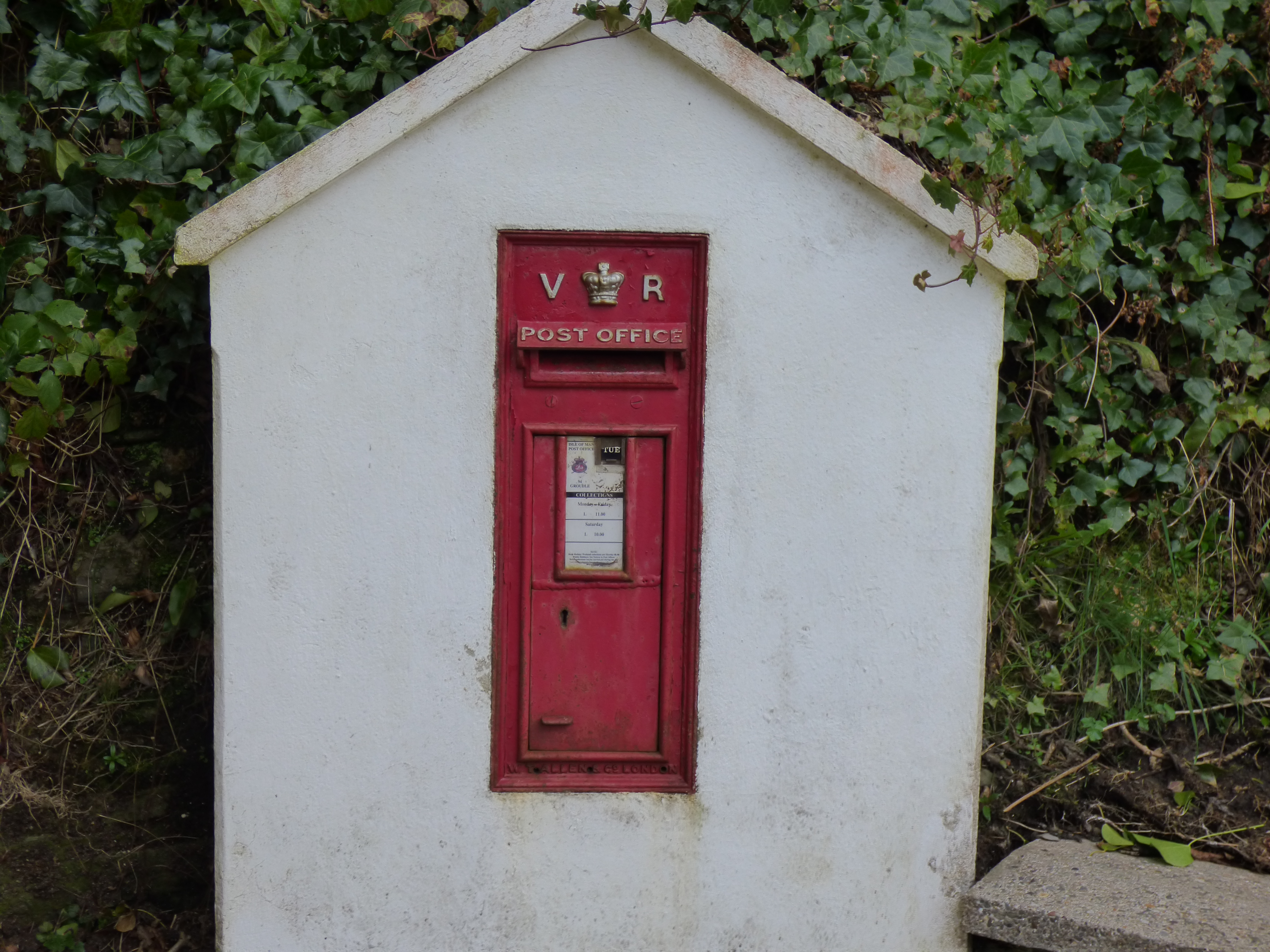
Groudle wall box

The station also features a post box, dating from the early part of the 20th century when the Manx Electric Railway held the contract for collection of mail at all stations and halts along its routes. The contract was lost in 1975 when the railway closed for the winter and could therefore not provide year-round collection facilities. Despite this, the station retains the post box, which is now cleared by Post Office staff in road vehicles. This practice continues at the other stopping places on the line, and is one of the distinctive features of even the most basic and remote of the line's stopping places. The box that remains in situ is the original one installed during the reign of Queen Victoria and was remodelled into a new plinth as part of the centenary celebrations for the station, it now only serves a handful of private residences nearby but remains in operational use. It was manufactured by W.T. Allen who held the contract from 1887 to make all such wall boxes. Travelling Post Offices remain a feature on the tramway during the annual Heritage Transport Festival using original restored mail vans.

== Connections ==
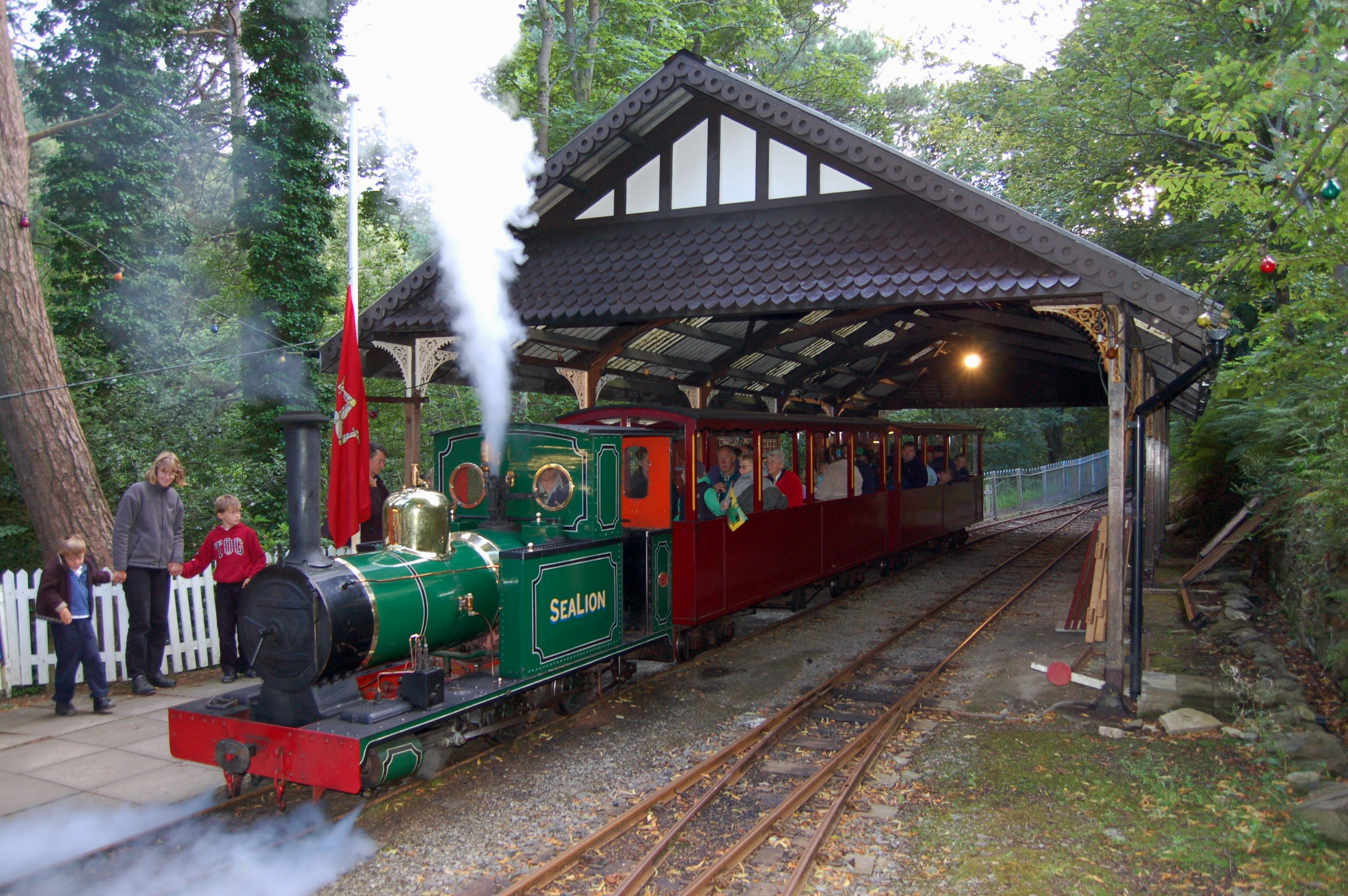
Sea Lion at Lhen Coan station

One of the main draws to the area was that Groudle Glen has its own heritage railway nearby, the Groudle Glen Railway, which was built in 1896 to serve the zoo which had opened 1893 on the outer edge of the glen. The two-foot gauge line ran intermittently after the Second World War and finally closed in 1962. It was restored from 1982 by the Isle of Man Steam Railway Supporters' Association and reopened fully in 1992 to Sea Lion Rocks. The line now operates each weekend in the summer and for certain other events, most notably Christmas when the popular Santa Trains run. The railway's main station is a short but steep walk from Groudle Glen Station through the glen passing the viaduct on which the electric railway is carried, the ornamental water wheel and area of the former dance floor which is now occupied by a bandstand installed in 1993 for the Year of Railways. In the past the glen pathway has been illuminated for pedestrians.

== Groudle Glen Hotel ==
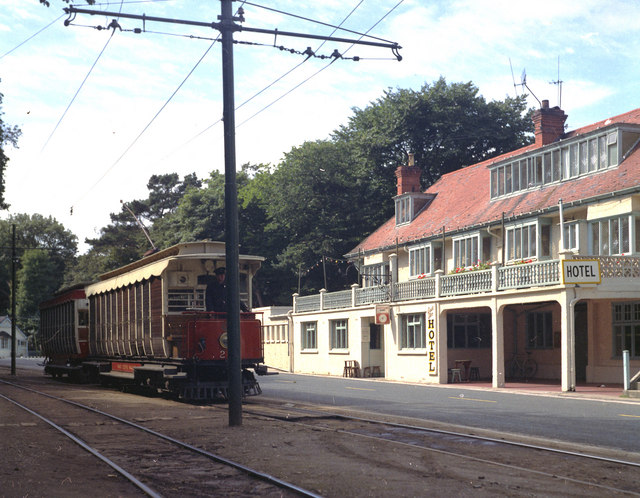
Groudle Glen Hotel

Directly opposite the station is the now closed Groudle Glen Hotel which was built upon the arrival of the railway in 1893 and designed by the renowned architect Baillie Scott and featuring a large saloon area at the rear supported on stilts over the valley below; an open sheltered canopy at its front elevation was later bricked in to create more accommodation and remains today, the flat roof of which forms a first floor veranda. It operated as a public bar for many years before being sold by the local brewery in 1999 and converted into a restaurant known as "La Casa". Its remote location ensured that the venture was not entirely successful; however, the new owners did much aesthetic work on the building, restoring stained glass windows, recreating historical signage and completely repainting the building including much of the original detailing such as the "three legs" motifs in the cornice work. Abandoned and largely derelict as at June 2024, the building is presently on the marketed with local estate agent Cowley Groves for £695,000 and there have been attempts to have it demolished in the past.

== Centenary ==
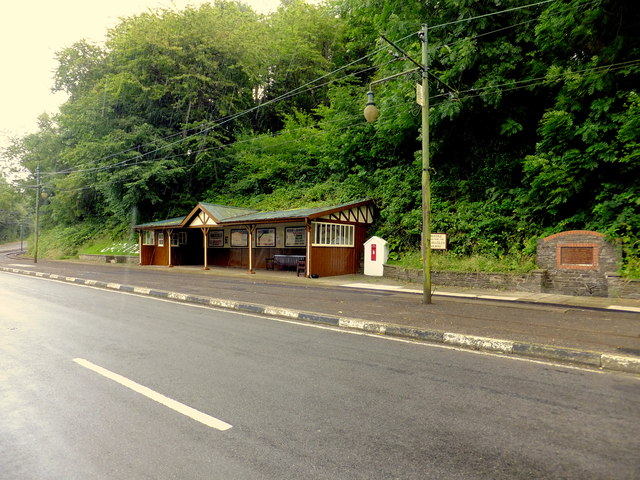
The station's large waiting shelter with commemorative plaque to the right, this was unveiled in 1993 to mark the centenary.

The station was considerably refurbished in 1993 for the island's Year of Railways to mark the centenary of this first section of the electric line; at this time, as well as receiving remedial attention to the shelter itself (including paving of the area and repainting, and the addition of old-fashioned advertisement signs) the surrounding area was also smartened up, with stone walling put in place denoting the station environs, and cast concrete letters being installed in the banking denoting the station name. A marble plaque marking the occasion of the centenary was unveiled by the Lieutenant Governor Sir Laurence Jones and remains in situ today, it is set into a specially built wall which surrounds one of the traditional weighted "tumbler" point levers which serve the crossover for short line working of tramcars. For the centenary a number of historical re-enactments were staged using the oldest rolling stock. On anniversary day in September 1993 a special tram conveying invited guests was met at the station by Jack Nivison, Captain of the Parish of Onchan in which the station is situated and accompanied by the Onchan Silver Band. A special champagne reception was held in the Groudle Glen Hotel where speeches were made honouring the event. A similar event was staged that Easter for the opening of the new canopy at Lhen Coan Station on the Groudle Glen Railway and commissioning of new bandstand.

== Route ==
Preceding station	Manx Electric Railway	Following station
Groudle Lane towards Derby Castle	Douglas–Ramsey	Eskadale towards Ramsey Station
Heritage railways
Change for the Groudle Glen Railway at Lhen Coan

== See also ==
- Manx Electric Railway stations
- Groudle Glen Railway
- Groudle Glen
- Onchan
- Howstrake Camp halt
- Groudle Lane halt
- Lhen Coan railway station
- Lime Kiln Halt railway station
- Sea Lion Rocks railway station
- Isle of Man
- Rail transport in the Isle of Man
- List of heritage railways
- British narrow-gauge railways
- List of tram and light rail transit systems
- Transport in the Isle of Man

== Sources ==
- Manx Electric Railway Stopping Places (2002) Manx Electric Railway Society
- Island Images: Manx Electric Railway Pages (2003) Jon Wornham
- Official Tourist Department Page (2009) Isle Of Man Heritage Railways
