= Headland railway station =

Railway station in Isle of Man, the UK

Headland Howe
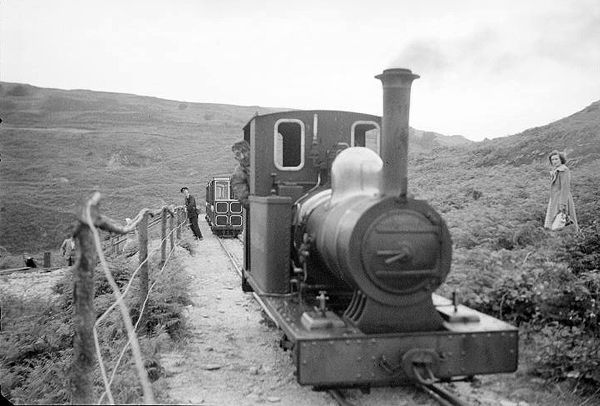

General information
- Location: Groudle, Isle of Man; England
- Coordinates: 54.1759°N 4.4202°W

Other information
- Status: Disused

History
- Post-grouping: Groudle Glen Railway

Key dates
- 1951: Opened
- 1962: Closed
- 1983: Reopened
- 1991: Closed
Location

Headland Station (Manx: Stashoon Howe) was the temporary terminus of the Groudle Glen Railway in the Isle of Man between 1983 and 1991, after which time the line was reinstated to its original terminus at Sea Lion Rocks. It also served as the terminus between 1950 and 1962.

== Origins ==
The station was created as the terminus of the line from the end of the Second World War until closure in 1962. A landslide on the section following it ensured that the line was impassable upon reopening after the war and a run-round loop installed here to facilitate the locomotive Polar Bear running around its rake of coaches. At this time steps installed to serve the headland cafe which overlooked the picturesque beach below. The loop utilised a shortened section of what had originally been an extra long passing loop installed in the early years of the twentieth century, facilitating the passing of two trains without the need for either to draw to a halt. Upon closure the lines were lifted and the site became part of a footpath.

== Reopening ==
Albeit slightly further along the line, from 1983 until the "extension" to Sea Lion Rocks opened in 1992, the area provided the outer terminus for the line, when resurrected by volunteers. The site was also the first workshop area until the line reached Lhen Coan in the spring of 1986 and the cleared site can be seen today from the passing train. At this time proposals were put forward for the erection of a stone-build hut based on the design of level crossing keepers' huts on the Isle of Man Railway but ultimately the work was concentrated on the lower portion of the line. At the end of the 1991 season the loop was removed and the extension laid.

== Resurrection ==
Once the line was reinstated to its full length in 1992, the line only had one rake of coaches and locomotive so there was no need for a passing loop here. It wasn't until 1994 when a second locomotive "Jack" arrived, that a smaller (three coach length) passing loop was installed on the site of the original (later) terminus to enable the restored line to operate two or three train operations. A siding, for the loading and unloading of locomotives and stock, spurs off the loop line and has been dubbed the "ski jump" owing to its steep gradient. This "ski jump" siding was removed in 2011, when the loop was relaid and doubled in length towards Sea Lion Rocks. A new siding is due to be laid in future years further around the corner towards Sea Lion Rocks on the site of the early 1980s siding that was laid during reconstruction of the line. This area of the line is ear-marked for a special halt by arrangement in the future for people with disabilities, as access to the railway is improved.

== Route ==
Preceding station	Heritage railways	Following station
Disused railways
Lime Kiln Halt towards Lhen Coan	Groudle Glen Railway 1951–1962, 1983–1991	Sea Lion Rocks Terminus

== Sources ==
- Railway's Official Website (2009) I.o.M.S.R.S.A.
- Island Island Images: Groudle Glen Railway Pages (2003) Jon Wornham
- Official Official Tourist Department Page (2009) Isle Of Man Heritage Railways
