= Groudle Lane halt =

Railway station in Isle of Man, the UK

Groudle Lane Lhoan Groudal
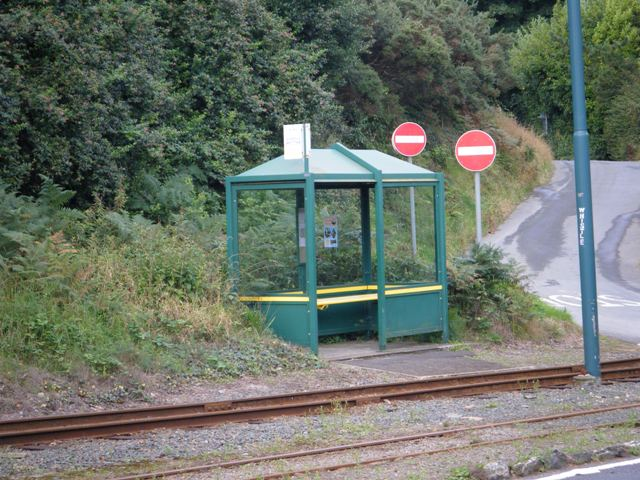

General information
- Location: King Edward Road; Onchan, Isle of Man
- Coordinates: 54.177384°N 4.426501°W
- Pole No.: 107-108
- System: The Manx Electric Railway Co., Ltd.
- Owner: Isle of Man Government; Department of Infrastructure
- Line: Manx Electric Railway
- Platforms: Ground Level
- Tracks: Two Running Lines

Construction
- Structure type: Bus Shelter

History
- Opened: 1894
Location

Groudle Lane halt (Manx: stadd Lhoan Groudal) (sometimes referred to as "Groudle Cottages" or "Groudle Village" in literature) is a request stop on the Manx Electric Railway on the Isle of Man, located below the line's first summit on the descent into the nearby valley of the same name.

== Facilities ==
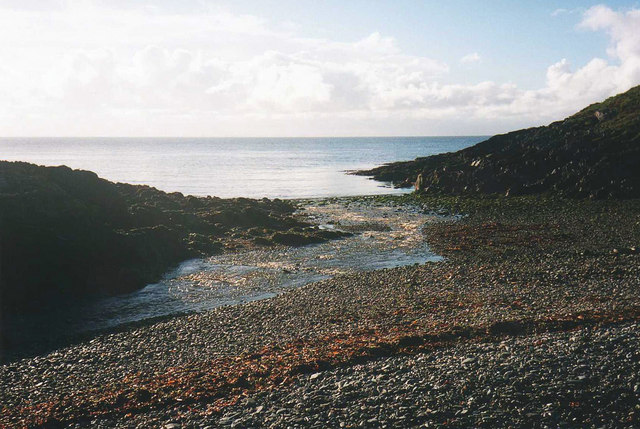
Groudle Beach which can be found at the bottom of the lane

This halt serves the nearby holiday cottages in the Groudle Glen valley and provides an alternative access stop for the Groudle Glen Railway on the other side of the valley. It is serviced by a modern bus-type shelter which was installed in 1999 in line with the management policy of the era. This shelter provides a dual purpose, as a limited bus route also operates on the road that runs parallel to the tram line formation. When the shelter was installed a short section of lineside was faced with tarmacadam to allow access to it, and advertisements for both railways appear therein.

== Location ==
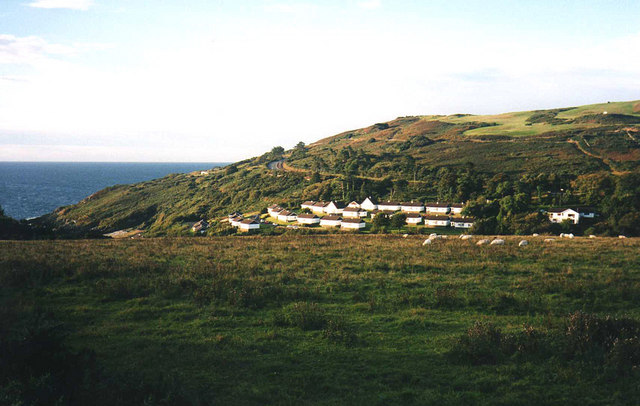
Viewed from the opposite headland with the cottages beneath

On foot, the request stop is located at the junction of the King Edward Road (that which parallels the railway) and the Groudle Lane, from which it gains its name. The lane runs (one-way towards the railway) commencing at Groudle Road in the local village of Onchan near to the King Edward Bay Golf Club which was once known as Howstrake Golf Club, given its close proximity to the area; it was renamed in the early 1990s to reflect its newly found status as a more up-market club upon completion of the club house and restaurant.

== Holiday cottages ==
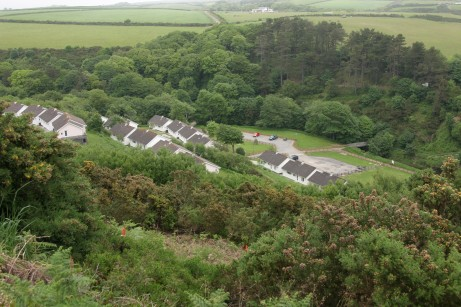
Groudle Glen Holiday Cottages (From King Edward Road)

The primary purpose of the halt is to serve the holiday village which was first established in the late 1970s across the road from the halt in the valley; the basic bungalows are of basic chalet construction. Since this time, the top close (cul-de-sac) of bungalows have been modified for residential use whilst the more popular bungalows towards the beach area are retained for letting purposes and remain in regular use by tourists and visitors to the island. There is also a larger detached house above the holiday village known as "Settler's Hollow", once home to the complex's owners and operators, which commands views over the glen and narrow gauge railway. The road which gives access to the development is a public one, which gives car access to the beach and its own car park. It was once a pack-horse lane, and today forms part of the island's Raad Ny Foillan coastal footpath. The stony beach is a popular destination with locals, and was once also accessible from the nearby holiday camp on the adjacent headland.

== Route ==
Preceding station	Manx Electric Railway	Following station
Howstrake Camp towards Derby Castle	Douglas–Ramsey	Groudle Glen towards Ramsey Station

== See also ==
- Manx Electric Railway stations
- Manx National Glens
- Groudle Glen

== Sources ==
- Manx Electric Railway Stopping Places (2002) Manx Electric Railway Society
- Island Images: Manx Electric Railway Pages (2003) Jon Wornham
- Official Tourist Department Page (2009) Isle of Man Heritage Railways
