= Eskadale Halt =

Railway station in Isle of Man, the UK

Eskadale Eskadale
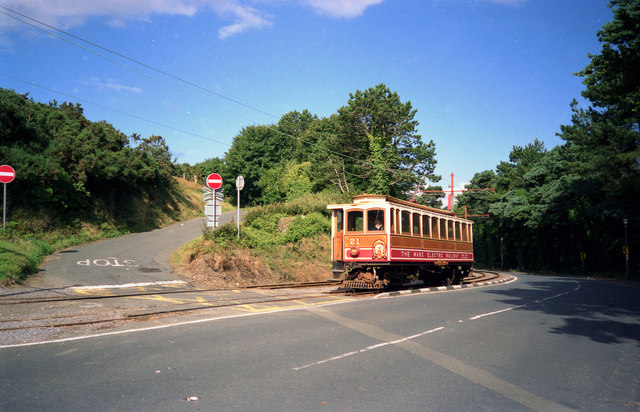

General information
- Location: Lonan, Isle Of Man
- Coordinates: 54.184635°N 4.427894°W
- Pole No.: 147-148
- System: Manx Electric Railway
- Owner: Isle Of Man Railways
- Line: Manx Electric Railway
- Platforms: Ground Level
- Tracks: Two Running Lines

Construction
- Structure type: None
- Parking: Roadside

History
- Opened: 1894
- Former names: Manx Electric Railway Co.
Location

Eskadale Halt (Manx: Stadd Eskadale) (sometimes mistakenly Eskdale) is an intermediate request stop on the east coast route of the Manx Electric Railway on the Isle of Man.

== Location ==
The halt is located at the northern extremity of Groudle Glen; it takes its name from the house that it stands next to, and is bisected by a small road crossing called Bibaloe Beg which serves the farm of the same name. Directly across from the station is the steep Old Lonan Church Road which eventually accesses the pack horse lane that leads to the Groudle Glen Railway and it is this road that the locomotives and larger equipment are delivered to the diminutive line on.

== Namesake ==
The house from which the stopping place takes its name is itself dominated by topiary in the shape of a peacock and was once the dwelling of Richard Maltby Broadbent, the entrepreneur who developed the nearby glen and railway. The house is of unusual style, including mock-Tudor gables and red brick construction, with modern garages to its side.

== Marketing ==
The stopping place was never officially marked until 1999 when a bus-type totem sign was erected on one of the traction poles to denote its presence. It is little used and not mentioned in the railway's timetable literature, although the 13/13A service of Bus Vannin serves the route on the parallel road.

== Route ==
Preceding station	Manx Electric Railway	Following station
Groudle Glen towards Derby Castle	Douglas–Ramsey	Balladromma Beg towards Ramsey Station

== Also ==
Manx Electric Railway Stations

== Sources ==
- Manx Electric Railway Stopping Places (2002) Manx Electric Railway Society
- Island Images: Manx Electric Railway Pages (2003) Jon Wornham
- Official Tourist Department Page (2009) Isle Of Man Heritage Railways
