= Year of Railways =

Special events held on the Isle of Man in 1993

The Year of Railways was a series of special events held on the Isle of Man during 1993 to commemorate the centenary of the opening of the first section of the Manx Electric Railway from Douglas (Derby Castle) to Groudle in September 1893.

Prior to 1993 the Isle of Man's steam and electric railways were already established as tourism attractions and had put on special events previously such as the 1973 Steam Railway Centenary, the 1993 Year of Railways was used as an opportunity to promote the Island as a mecca for rail and engineering enthusiasts.

== Events ==
Although 1993 was the centenary of the Manx Electric Railway, the events showcased all of the Islands railways and more with intensive activities during three periods. Each of the event periods commenced with "meet and greet" sessions held at Summerland, where organisers, directors, staff and other influential people from the railways were on hand. As well as outlining the event timetables, there were slideshows, question-and-answer sessions and general chat. The majority of the events were simple railway-based activities, although the opportunity was also taken to do things a little differently. They included:

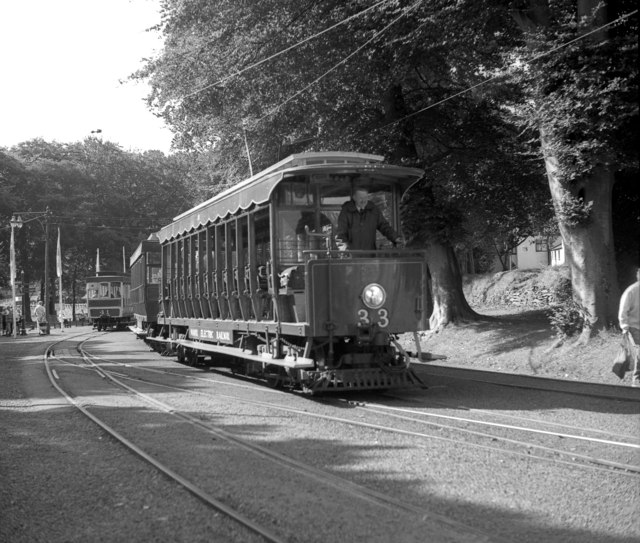
Trams at Laxey station during the celebration on 27 August 1993

- Parallel running of the two original tramcars dating from the opening of the line; this usually took place prior to daily services to facilitate use of both running lines
- Use of a low loader to transfer No. 4 "Loch" of the Isle of Man Railway to Laxey where it ran a service pulling two MER trailers along a section to Dhoon Quarry
- Tram 9 decorated by engineers from Blackpool to become illuminated; it ran shuttles to Groudle where the Groudle Glen Railway put on evening services
- Tram Cavalcade at Laxey where every available tram, trailer, works vehicle and the steam engine performed a run by with a historic and trivia based commentary
- Photo trams and trains ran which would stop at preselected scenic locations so that the passengers could alight, photograph and proceed to the next location
- Chasing buses that shadowed special services to viewpoints and chased ahead to await the arrival of trains/trams, sometimes utilising vintage buses
- Special tram services were featured that included running commentaries about the views and attractions along the length of the routes with stopping places
- Floodlit evening photography and barbecues were held with staff creating shunting movements for the benefit of spectators, often with little-used rolling stock
- Guided tours around sheds and depots which would normally be closed to members of the public, both in the day and in conjunction with evening sessions
- Guided walks of the closed railway lines to Peel, Ramsey and Foxdale with connecting vintage buses and coaches between venues, and refreshments
- Slide and film shows with a "bring your own along" policy ensuring a varied mix of entertainments, also including raffles and other attractions
- Operation of the restored Upper Douglas Cable Car along the promenade at Douglas prior to the operation of usual horse tram services
- Cavalcade line-ups of the horse tram fleet outside the workshops at Derby Castle, including some rarely used tramcars in service along the promenade
- The return of "Polar Bear" to the Groudle Glen Railway for a month-long visit, including double headed trains, freight trains, and the like
- Use of a low loader to return No. 4 "Loch" to Douglas, this time towed by steam road locomotives DUKE OF YORK, and ATLAS driven by Fred Dibnah.

Organised by the staff and friends of the railways including local preservationist groups, and backed up by the island's Department of Tourism and Leisure, which own the railways, these events were hailed both on and off the island as a resounding success. Total visitor numbers for the events were estimated at 35,000, second only at attracting visitors behind the T.T. Races. The success of the year's events paved the way for a period of much interest in the island's railways over the next years, and this was reflected in the array of events between 1994 and 1998 culminating in the 125th anniversary of the railway.

== Subsequent festivals ==
Following the success of the Year of Railways, the lines played host to similar events to celebrate other milestones in the histories of the island's railways.

- 1994 100 years of tram services to Laxey.
- 1995 The International Railway Festival marked the centenary of the Snaefell Mountain Railway.
- 1996 for the centenary of the Groudle Glen Railway
- 1998 Steam 125 marked 125 years of the Isle of Man Steam Railway from Douglas to Peel.

There were also lower-key events in 1997 and 1999 for the centenary of tram services to Ramsey, but despite their smaller scale they were well attended by visitors.

From 1999, although events still took place annually, they were held on a much smaller scale, usually over a weekend in July or August with fewer one-off events being held. They usually consisted of more straightforward events such as unusual tramcars in operation, double-headed trains, non-passenger vehicles in service. Events such as night photography, slide shows and such, were phased out.

From 2009 the event has been renamed as the "Manx Heritage Transport Festival", and it is intended to hold the event annually over the same period in future: starting on the Wednesday of the last week in July and continuing until the following Tuesday, with events on all railways, and some non-rail events such as vintage bus tours, boat trips, and the like.
