= Howstrake Camp halt =

Railway station in Isle of Man, the UK

Howstrake Camp Campal Howstrake
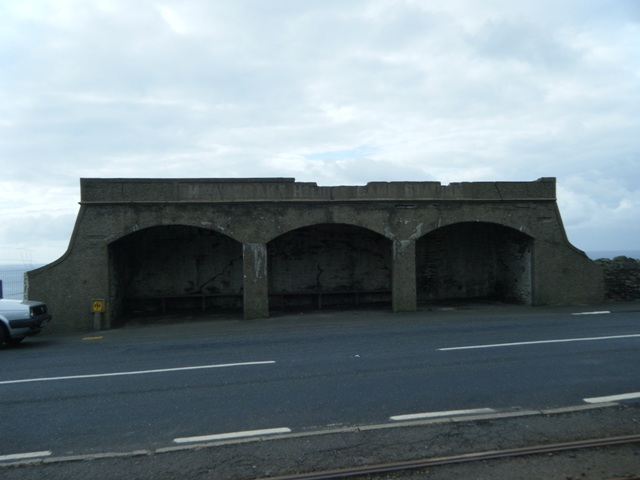

General information
- Coordinates: 54.171560°N 4.425486°W
- Pole No.: 087-088
- System: The Manx Electric Railway Co., Ltd.
- Owner: Isle of Man Government; Department of Infrastructure
- Platforms: Ground Level
- Tracks: Two Running Lines

Construction
- Structure type: Stone Shelter

History
- Opened: 1893
Location

Howstrake Camp halt (Manx: Stadd Campal Howstrake) (occasionally "Howstrake Holiday Camp station") is a stop on the Manx Electric Railway on the Isle of Man located at the line's first summit on the climb from the terminus, before descending into the nearby valley.

== Usage ==
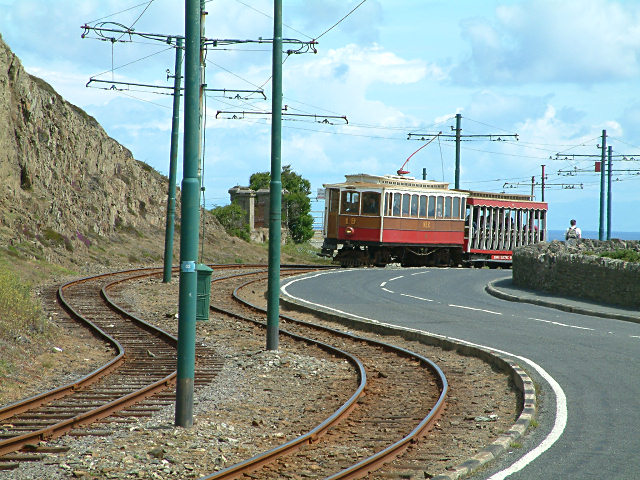
One of the tramway's four winter saloons hauling a trailer and heading south passing the site of the halt

The station was established upon the creation of the adjacent camp and was used almost exclusively in conjunction with these facilities, from which it gained its name; access was via a tunnel through the remaining ornamental gates on the landward side which also featured a toll booth for entrance, long since demolished, accessing the camp via a similar booth. Despite the closure of the camp in 1985, it remains a functioning request tram stop today. It also retains its original stone-built waiting shelter albeit in a poor state of repair, which has its name painted on the wall facing the tramway and bears the legend "Howstrake Holiday Camp Station" along its roof line, albeit very faded. The building has been in a poor state of repair for a number of years and is now fenced-off. Originally the building was erected by and maintained by the owners of the holiday camp, it is one of the most exposed locations on the tramway for a stopping place and is on a tight curve and steep gradient which makes for the familiar "squeal" of wheels from passing tramcars.

== Today ==
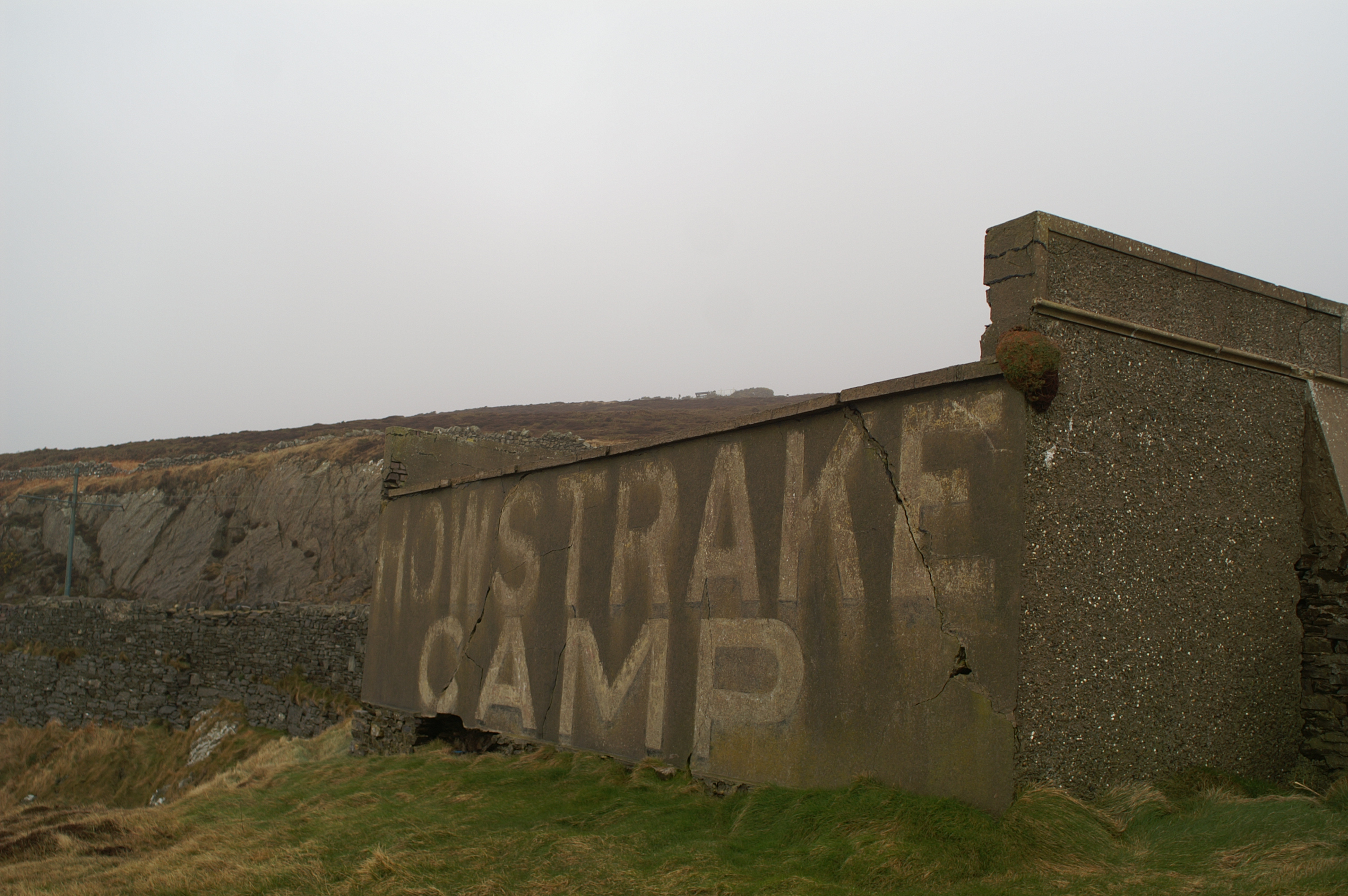

The station has remained nominally open, since the closure of the adjacent holiday camp in 1985, but facilities have not been maintained on site for many years. After part of the roof collapsed, the station building was closed and fenced-off around 2015 and remains so today (2024). Tramcars do still stop here but only on request of passengers, or by flagging down a passing car to board. Being situated on an exposed coastal headland the shelter formerly provided welcome respite for walkers, the coastal road being a popular walk. The camp itself is in private ownership and has been in a state of dereliction for many years with some chalet buildings and outdoor swimming pool still extant, the faded wording (inset) which is visible from sea denoting the name of the camp remains visible on the rear of the shelter. Whilst it does not appear on the timetable in common with many other wayside halts, it remains served by the tramway today on a request basis.

== Locality ==
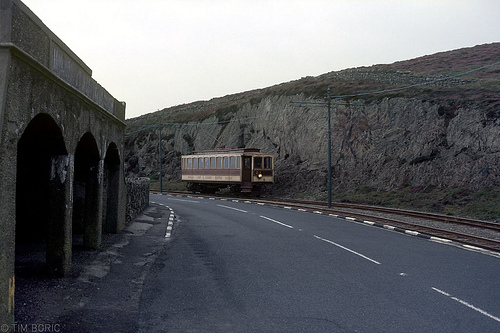
The shelter, left, and one of the winter saloons passing.

Today the area is in a state of decay as can be seen from the dilapidated state of this once-grand entrance area. The station is something of an oddity, being that the shelter is on the "wrong side" compared to the entrance gates meaning that the road must be crossed between the two when there is in fact sufficient land for the shelter on the railway side of the road which is taken up by large entrance gates; upon first glance these gates appear to lead nowhere, but they actually once led to a tunnel which was the official entrance to the camp proper, located on the rocks below the tramlines, and the entrance point to the tunnel can be seen from the passing trams a few yards further down the line, noted by a substantial stone wall to the left of the running lines. The tunnel had however been sealed off since the closure of the camp, but the small toll cottage can still be made out in the undergrowth on the other side of the line. The hillside which dominates the site above is home to the golf links of the same name, more latterly re-branded as King Edward Bay Golf Course.

== Camp ==
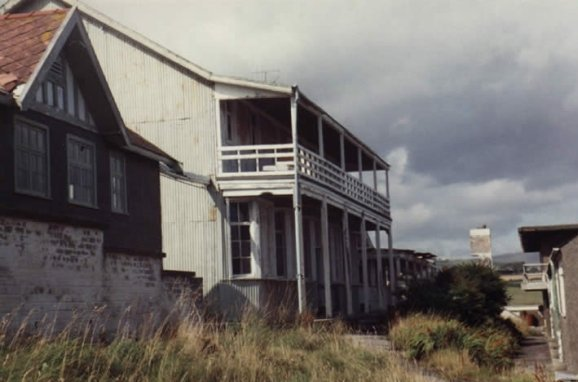
Derelict chalets at the camp after its closure, many of which have since been demolished, only a handful of the more modern chalets remain on the site today and have been in disrepair for many years.

=== Holiday camp ===
The camp itself sprawled across the hillside overlooking the Groudle Glen Railway on the adjacent hillside and some of the chalets remain today; the area is private property but reasonable views of it can be achieved from the outer terminus of the aforementioned railway, and some information about the site is also available here. A private pathway and bridge led down to Groudle Beach below for bathing purposes, remnants of the derelict bridge remain on the beach today.

=== Mixed sexes ===
The camp was first developed as a male-only tented village with all accommodation being in the form of distinctive looking bell tents. In the late 19th century it caused scandal by becoming the first camp on the island available to both sexes and it was operated by the same company that ran the enormously successful Cunningham's Camp in Douglas some four miles away. Latterly it was a seasonal affair and after a fire ripped through the main dining hall in 1985 it closed.

=== War use ===
During the Second World War the camp was used as a music school by the Royal Naval School of Music before returning to holiday use upon cessation of the hostilities.

== Route ==
Preceding station	Manx Electric Railway	Following station
Far End towards Derby Castle	Douglas–Ramsey	Groudle Lane towards Ramsey Station

== See also ==
Manx Electric Railway stations

== Sources ==
- Manx Electric Railway Stopping Places (2002) Manx Electric Railway Society
- Island Images: Manx Electric Railway Pages (2003) Jon Wornham
- Official Tourist Department Page (2009) Isle Of Man Heritage Railways
