= Lime Kiln Halt railway station =

Railway station in Isle of Man, the UK

Lime Kiln Aiee Eayil
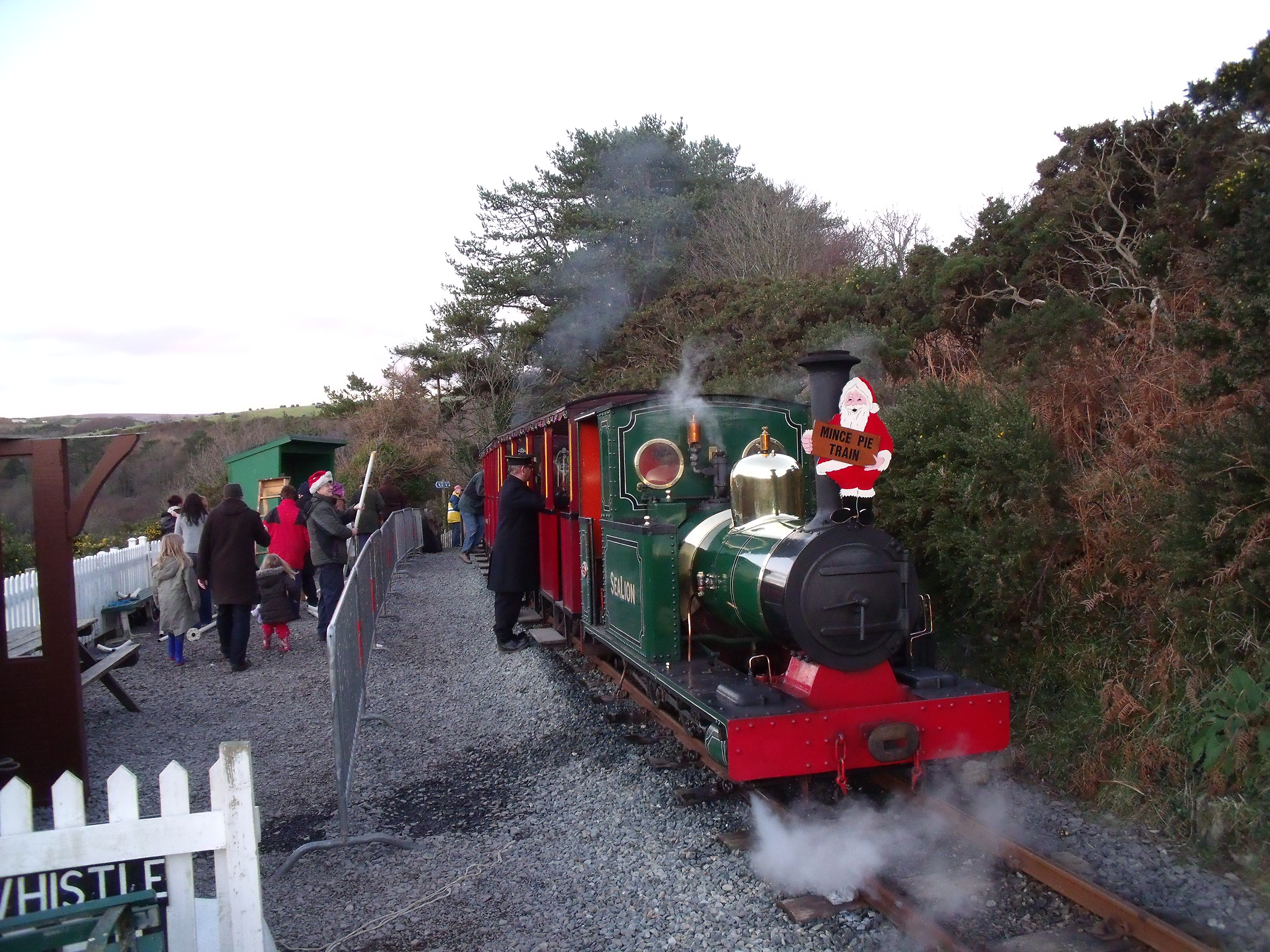

General information
- Location: Groudle, Isle of Man
- Coordinates: 54.1764°N 4.4215°W
- System: Groudle Glen Railway
- Owner: Groudle Glen Railway
- Platforms: Ground Level
- Tracks: One Running Line

Construction
- Structure type: Wooden Shelters
- Parking: None

History
- Opened: 1983
Location

Lime Kiln Halt (Manx: Stadd Aiee Eayil) is the only intermediate station on the narrow gauge Groudle Glen Railway in the Isle of Man; it also serves as the line's temporary terminus on certain occasions. It is situated at the midpoint of the short line, above the nearby beach and car park.

== Naming ==
The halt is named for a nearby lime kiln, along the course of the old packhorse road which now forms part of the Raad Ny Foillan, the island's coastal footpath. The station area is demarcated by a section of white picket fencing and has waiting shelters but no raised platform: the railway's coaches have a low enough floor level to enable access from ground level. When the rebuilt railway was formally inaugurated in 1986, sign boards reflecting the station's status were placed.

== Origins ==
There was no station here in the early days of the railway: trains ran from one terminus to the other with no intermediate stopping places; it was born out of necessity, being the spot where tracklaying commenced in 1982 at the start of the restoration, and it became a station by default. For the first year or so trains only operated between this point and the headland, a few hundred yards east. When track laying extended into the glen section, reaching Lhen Coan in 1986, Lime Kiln Halt was retained owing to its ease of access from the nearby car park.

== Structures ==
The first structure placed on the site was a portion of porch from an old cottage named "Myrtle Cottage", so that was the colloquial name given to the hut; this was replaced in 1992 by a plywood structure and gained the nickname "Myrtle II". This too was replaced in 2001 by a much wider and shallower structure which remains on site today. There is also a donated ex-Bus Vannin shelter at the eastern end of the platform and this was installed in 2007. All structures were repainted in a green and cream colour scheme by a team from Barclays Wealth in 2010 as part of a community project, and all picket fencing was replaced around the station by the Onchan Rotary Club as part of a project in 2011.

== North Pole Halt ==
In conjunction with the railway's Santa trains each December the station is renamed North Pole Halt and is transformed into a waiting area, serving as the line's temporary terminus for the running days (the headland section is not used as it is exposed to possible inclement weather). Festoon lighting is erected, and a large temporary canopy provided as shelter for passengers, and the area suitably fenced to provide a queuing area for waiting passengers. So, despite being one of the quietest stations on the island generally, for four days each December it is transformed into one of the island's busiest.

== Access ==
The station can be accessed on foot, climbing the footpath from the nearby Groudle Beach, or from above, using the old pack horse road which provides limited vehicular access for the railway's staff, largely for delivery purposes. Other than this, the railway is the easiest way to reach the station, by informing the train guard.

== Route ==
Preceding station	Heritage railways	Following station
Lhen Coan Terminus	Groudle Glen Railway	Sea Lion Rocks Terminus
Disused railways
Lhen Coan Terminus	Groudle Glen Railway 1951–1962, 1983–1991	Headland Terminus

== Sources ==
- Official Website (2009) I.o.M.S.R.S.A.
- Island Island Images: Groudle Glen Railway Pages (2003) Jon Wornham
- Official Official Tourist Department Page (2009) Isle Of Man Heritage Railways
