= Steam 125 =

1998 Isle of Man Railway series of events

Steam 125 was a series of events held in 1998 to mark the 125th anniversary of the Isle of Man Railway opening its first route from Douglas to Peel. This line was closed in 1968 but the line to Port Erin which opened the following year remains in operation. Although there are still annual events, this was the last of the "big" railway events on the island which had begun with the Year of Railways in 1993 to mark the centenary of the Manx Electric Railway.

== Events ==
The most notable event was the return to service of the original steam locomotive No. 1 Sutherland which hauled special services all year, including excursions on the Manx Electric Railway. Events elsewhere on the island's railway network included:

- An illuminated tram decorated to proclaim Steam 125 running shuttles to Groudle where the Groudle Glen Railway put on evening services
- Photo trams and trains ran which would stop at selected scenic locations so that the passengers could alight, photograph and proceed to the next location
- A visiting locomotive, Jack, on the Groudle Glen Railway
- Buses shadowing special services to viewpoints and awaiting the arrival of trains/trams, sometimes utilising vintage buses
- Special tram services with commentaries about the views and attractions along the length of the route
- Parallel-running of a variety of electric tramcars, usually this took place prior to daily services to facilitate use of both running lines
- Flood-lit evening photography events with staff creating shunting movements for the benefit of spectators, often with little-used rolling stock
- Guided tours around sheds and depots which would normally be closed to members of the public
- Guided walks of the closed railway lines to Peel, Ramsey and Foxdale
- Slide and film shows
- No. 1 Sutherland running on a small section of track in what had previously been Peel railway station
- Cavalcade line-ups of the Douglas Horse Tram fleet outside the workshops at Derby Castle

== See also ==
- Snaefell Mountain Railway
- Great Laxey Mine Railway
