= Balladromma Beg Halt =

Railway station in Isle of Man, the UK

Balladromma Beg Balley Drommey Beg
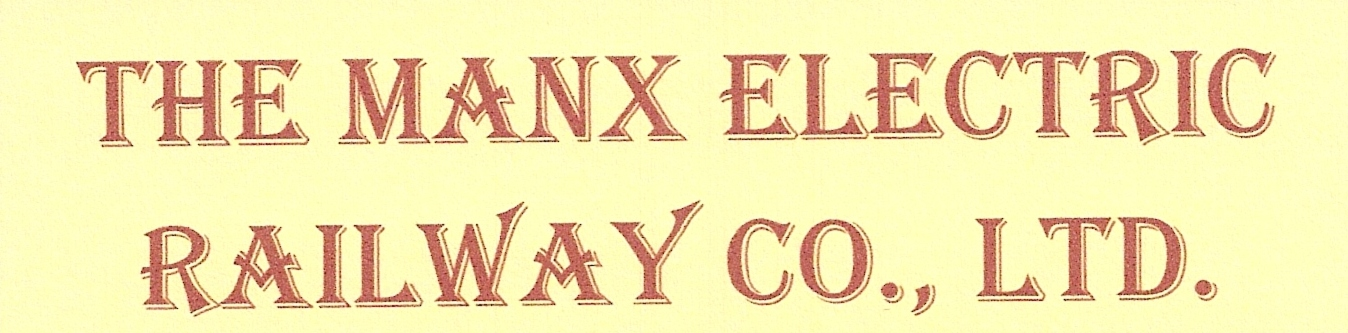

General information
- Location: Lonan, Isle Of Man
- Coordinates: 54.19389°N 4.424206°W
- Pole Nos.: 178-179
- System: Manx Electric Railway
- Owner: Isle Of Man Railways
- Platforms: Ground Level
- Tracks: Two Running Lines

Construction
- Structure type: Demolished
- Parking: None

History
- Opened: 1896
- Former names: Manx Electric Railway Co.
Location

Balladromma Beg Halt (Manx: Stadd Valley Drommey Beg) is an intermediate stopping place on the Manx Electric Railway on the Isle of Man.

== Alias ==
The halt is sometimes referred to as "Halfway House" in reference to the nearby public house and one-time coaching house, now known as the Liverpool Arms.

== Facilities ==
Today it remains as a request stop marked by a solitary sign denoting the fact, and a post box mounted in a concrete pillar, a remnant of the days when the railway held the contract for mail collection which it held until 1975 when winter closure necessitated its demise. The station once had a waiting shelter for passengers which took the form of a traditional M.E.R. style corrugated iron hut. This was installed circa 1900 but has long since been demolished. Nearby is a modern bus shelter used for the island's Bus Vannin services which doubles up as a shelter for waiting tram passengers at this rural location.

== Traffic ==
The majority of traffic at this spot is gleaned from customers to the nearby public house which was often reached by tramcar until relatively recently when timetable cutbacks and modifications ensured that this was no longer viable for most, bus services being preferred.

== Location ==
To the immediate north of the halt, the railway crosses the main Douglas-Laxey road for the first time, the halt itself sits to the north of an un-gated level crossing carrying the Douglas-Baldrine coast road. At one time this was a railway-operated toll road.

== Route ==
| Preceding station | Manx Electric Railway | Following station |
|---|---|---|
| Eskadale towards Derby Castle | Douglas–Ramsey | Scarffe's Crossing towards Ramsey Station |

== Also ==
Manx Electric Railway Stations

== Sources ==
- Manx Electric Railway Stopping Places (2002) Manx Electric Railway Society
- Island Images: Manx Electric Railway Pages (2003) Jon Wornham
- Official Tourist Department Page (2009) Isle Of Man Heritage Railways
