= Manx National Glens =

Series of glens in the Isle of Man

Coordinates: 54°10′N 4°30′W

Manx National Glens is a collective term for a series of glens in the Isle of Man which have been officially designated as tourist attractions. They are maintained by the Department of Environment, Food and Agriculture. The island is known for its "pocket sized" natural glens.

Many of these glens (in Manx, glion or glan) are to be found in wooded, steep river cuttings.

== List of National Glens ==
Name	Image	Location	Brief notes
Ballaglass Glen		Central Maughold	On river Cornaa. Has MER halt. Former forestry land, 16 acres, former corn mill
Ballure Walk		Adjoins S of Ramsey	Has MER halt. Runs along short stretch of A15 road.
Bishopscourt Glen		On A3 between Kirk Michael and Ballaugh	Parking facilities very limited. 5 acres, about 600 m long, features the Cave of the Winds
Bradda Glen and Headland		Adjoins Port Erin	Not physically a glen. Leads toward Bradda Head and Milner's Tower.
Colby Glen		Colby	Formed historic boundary between Arbory and Rushen parishes. 5 acres, along Colby River
Dhoon Glen		South Maughold	On A2. Has MER halt. Height span of nearly 200 metres. Length about 1 km; waterfall.
Elfin Glen & Claughbane Woods		Adjoins S of Ramsey	Accessed from Ramsey Hairpin
Glen Helen		On A3, N of St John's	On TT course
Glen Maye		Village of same name Patrick parish	Famous waterfall
Glen Mooar		Michael parish, on A4	NB Not the only place on the island called Glen Mooar
Glen Wyllin		Adjacent to Kirk Michael	Extends south to Cooildarry
Groudle Glen		On A2 about 1 mile E of Onchan	Has MER halt and its own railway
Laxey Glen		Laxey; near Laxey Wheel	
Lhergy Frissel		Adjoins S of Ramsey	
Molly Quirk's Glen & Bibaloe Walk		Adjoins Onchan	Close to Groudle Glen
Port Soderick Glen		Forms part of boundary between Braddan and Santan. 15 acres; on Crogga River. Has steam railway station	
Silverdale Glen		Near Ballasalla	Mainly level. Has children's playground
Tholt-y-Will Glen	Olt Falls, within Tholt-y-Will Glen, in early 1900s postcard image	On A14 near Sulby Reservoir	As of October 2017 not fully accessible due to damaged bridge.

== Friends ==
The Friends of the Glens is an informal volunteer organisation dedicated to promoting the Manx glens.

== See also ==
- Sulby Glen
