= Lhen Coan railway station =

Railway station in Isle of Man, the UK

Lhen Coan Lhen Coan
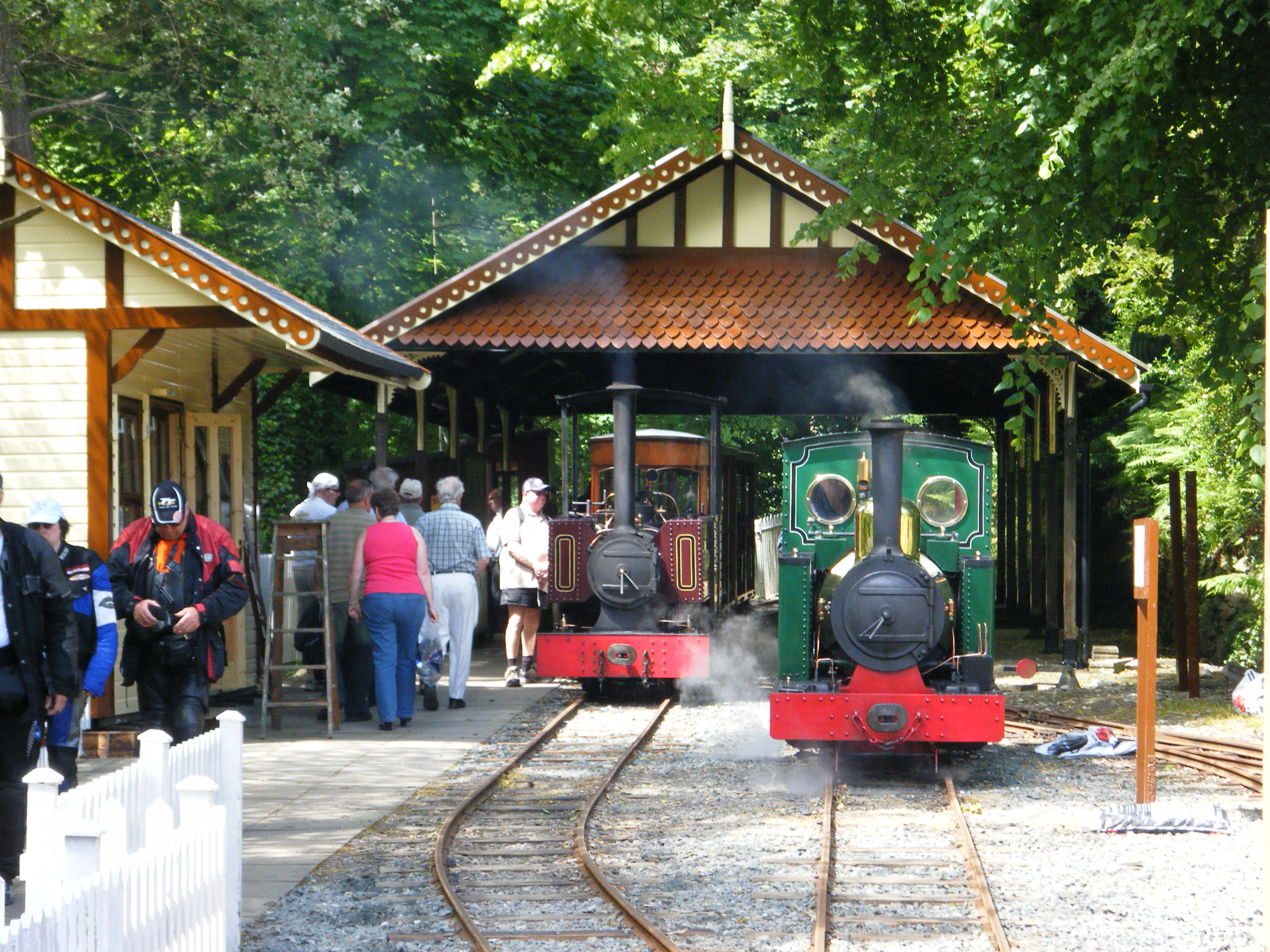

General information
- Location: Groudle Glen, Isle Of Man
- Coordinates: 54.1789°N 4.4269°W
- System: Groudle Glen Railway
- Owner: Groudle Glen Railway
- Platforms: Ground Level
- Tracks: Various

Construction
- Structure type: Various
- Parking: None

History
- Opened: 1896 (Reopened 1986)
- Rebuilt: 1986-1998
Location

Lhen Coan Station (Manx: Stashoon Lhen Coan) is the landward terminus of the Groudle Glen Railway in the Isle of Man. It is reached by visitors from the nearby Groudle Glen railway station on the Manx Electric Railway.

== Naming ==
The main terminus of the Groudle Glen Railway is located in the heart of the glen and it's commonly thought it was named after a small glen spur from the main glen, but that is in fact called Glen Coan which translated from the local Manx Gaelic means "Narrow Valley" but at some point in history it adopted the name Lhen Coan for reasons unknown, which translated means "Narrow Lane"

== Location ==
The station sits on a shelf on the northern side of the valley and was originally served by a run-round loop, covered overall by a Swiss-style canopy, with single-road locomotive shed and siding. There was also a souvenir shop which took hexagonal form in a style similar to those seen on the nearby Manx Electric Railway. The locomotive shed was destroyed by a fallen tree in 1967 and the unsafe canopy was destroyed in 1979, leaving the site empty.

== Restoration ==
When the restoration of the line by volunteers from the Isle of Man Steam Railway Supporters' Association began in 1982 the site was merely a footpath and took considerable effort to reach with the new railhead. By 1986 however a new metal-framed, three-road locomotive and carriage shed was opened, just forward of the site of the original, serving as the line's only covered area for stock.

== Canopy ==
By 1993 a replica of the distinctive station canopy was completed and in the intervening years a number of small temporary huts have been erected beginning with a booking office (later moved and used as a store), a souvenir shop (now located under the canopy and at one time used as a tea room until the installation of facilities at the outer terminus), larger replacement souvenir shop and store room which doubles as a grotto for the festive services. A further siding was added in 2005 and a lean-to building created to store vehicles.

== Developments ==
In 2007 the railway erected a two-road, purpose-built locomotive shed in a similar style to the original, which necessitated the removal of the station siding and widening of the area; this shed is now in use, and a further siding is being laid in front of what is now the carriage shed for further permanent way stock storage. The station site is now considerably larger than it was in the days of the original line but the volunteers have been careful to not lose the feeling of the original station. In the early part of 2009 a new souvenir shop was erected, similar in style to the replica canopy; the station was also refurbished in a lighter shade of brown and cream. In 2011 the 1992 booking office hut was deemed beyond repair and was replaced with a new booking office constructed in similar style to the new shop and canopy building and painted in the station colour scheme of brown and cream.

In 2012 planning permission was granted to extend the platform area substantially out into the glen, and to construct a new larger utility building to replace the old tea hut of 1986. Construction work started in September, funded by the Manx Lottery Trust and Tower Insurance, and required the railway to transport 140 tons of rock to the site, for the platform extension foundations and infill. New stone faced walls to link the 2007 engine shed to the existing 1896 dry stone wall were also part of the project. The building was constructed by volunteer joiner Stephen Goody to match the style of the canopy, shop and booking office, and the entire area was completed in time for the Christmas services.

== Structures ==
- Station Canopy (Built 1896, Demolished 1979)
- Replica Canopy (Built 1992, Extant)
- Band Stand / Platform (Built 1896, Demolished 19??)
- Shop / Ticket Office (Built 1896, Demolished 193?)
- One-Road Locomotive Shed (Built 1896, Demolished 1967)
- Three-Road Carriage Shed (Built 1986, Extant)
- Two-Road Locomotive Shed (Built 2007, Extant)
- Booking Office (Built 1984, Demolished 1997)
- Booking Office (Built 1992, Demolished 2011)
- Booking Office (Built 2011 by Stephen Goody, Extant)
- Souvenir Shop (Built 1986, became Coffee Shop / Christmas Tea Hut 1990s, Demolished 2012)
- Utility Building with Historical Display area (Built 2012 by Stephen Goody, Extant)
- Store / Grotto (Built 1999, Extant)
- Staff Mess Hut (Built 2006, Extant)
- Mock Signal Cabin (Built 2008, Extant)
- Souvenir Shop (Built 2009, Extant)

== Route ==
Preceding station	Heritage railways	Following station
Terminus	Groudle Glen Railway	Lime Kiln Halt towards Sea Lion Rocks
Manx Electric Railway
Change for the Manx Electric Railway at Groudle Glen

== Sources ==
- Official Website (2009) I.o.M.S.R.S.A.
- Island Island Images: Groudle Glen Railway Pages (2003) Jon Wornham
- Official Official Tourist Department Page (2009) Isle Of Man Heritage Railways
