= Sea Lion Rocks railway station =

Railway station in Isle of Man, the UK

Sea Lion Rocks
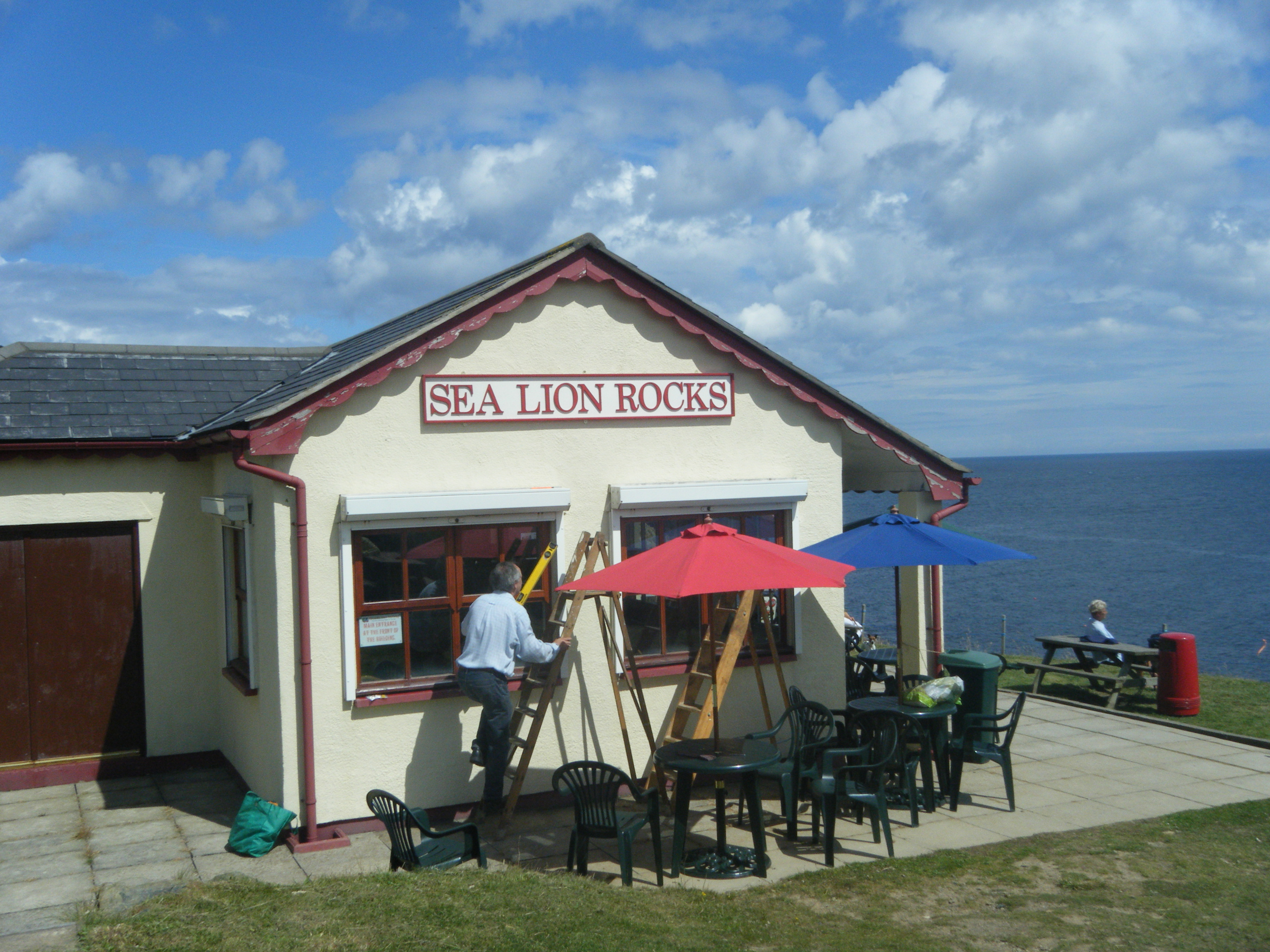

General information
- Location: Groudle Glen, Isle of Man
- Coordinates: 54.1773°N 4.4171°W
- System: Groudle Glen Railway
- Owner: Groudle Glen Railway
- Platforms: Ground Level
- Tracks: One Running Line & Loop

Construction
- Structure type: Tea Room & Visitor Centre
- Parking: None

History
- Opened: 1896 / 1992
- Closed: 1939
Location

Sea Lion Rocks (Manx: Stashoon Chreggyn Raun Chleayshagh) is a railway station and outer terminus of the Groudle Glen Railway in the Isle of Man. It served as the outer terminus from 1896 until 1939 and again from 1992 to date.

== Location ==
The terminus is situated some three-quarters of a mile away from the other end of the line. It opened as the outer terminus of the line in 1896, at which point the building was erected including tea rooms, bake house, fish store and seasonal living quarters for the staff. The zoo, created in the adjacent cove, had been a feature from 1893 and was the reason for the building of the line. The station closed at the outbreak of the Second World War; although the railway reopened in 1950, a landslip during the war years prevented the line being re-opened this far, and it was not until the restored line was extended in 1992 that the station re-opened, later receiving a replica station building in 2000.

== Structures ==
Over the years, there were several additions to the buildings and structures, and very few photographs of any quality are in existence; those that do exist show a main building with several smaller and somewhat ramshackle huts surrounding it. It is unclear when the station building was demolished, but it is understood to have still been there in the early 1960s. By the time the line was resurrected in 1982 it had vanished completely. In the winter of 1991 major earthworks were carried out so that the line could once more terminate at Sea Lion Rocks.

== Reopening ==
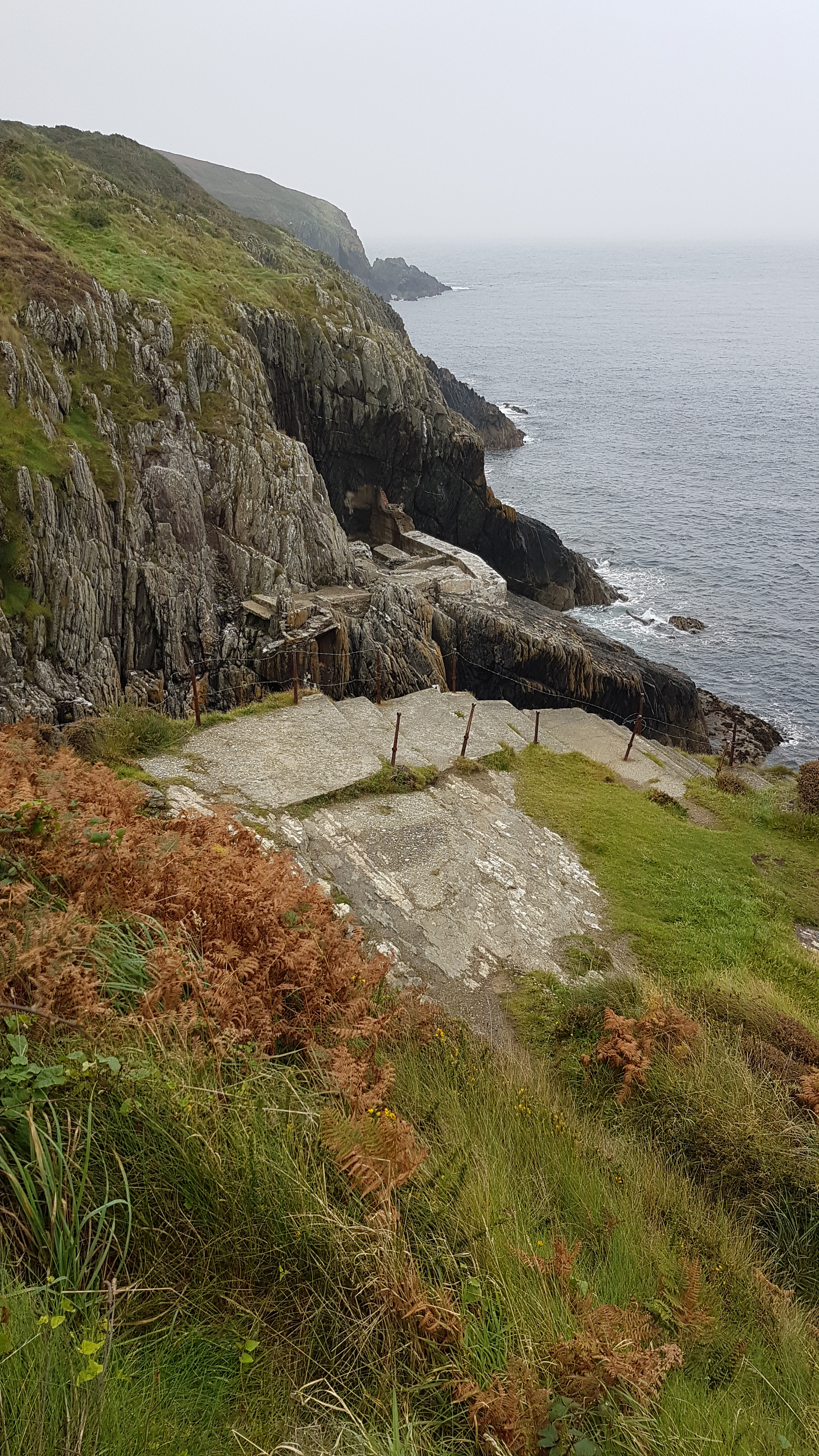
Sea Lion Cove September 2017

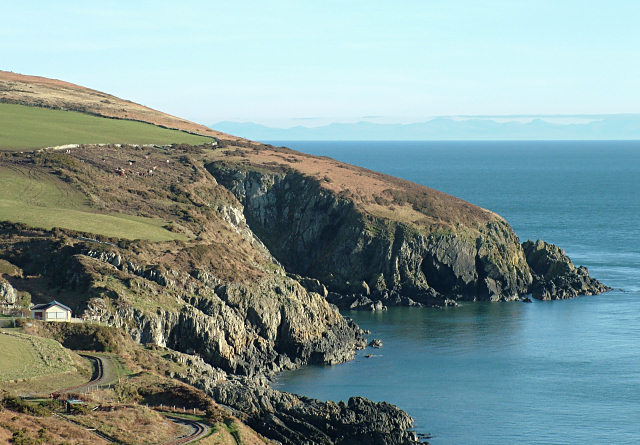
From Coastal Road

On 23 July 1992 the line was fully reopened as the line's terminus by James Crookall Cain (Speaker of the House of Keys, the lower branch of the island's parliament) who hammered into place the final burnished Pandrol rail fastener. It was another eight years before any form of building was erected, leading to the volunteers nicknaming the area "Soil & Rocks" as opposed to "Sea Lion Rocks". The building that now stands on the site of the original was built directly on top of foundations discovered at the time and is largely faithful to the original, based on postcard views of the time. Construction began in the year 2000 and has since continued over the summer months, owing to the inclement nature of the weather on the site.

The station area has, in the time since the building was erected, been fenced and landscaped in a sympathetic way to blend with the environs and this is an ongoing task by the volunteers who operate the railway. Since 2002 a tea room and souvenir outlet has operated at the station, which also houses historical displays and an indoor seating area. The site continues to be slowly developed by the volunteers. Period details such as coin-operated telescopes have been installed in recent times, and the large flagpole which dominates many old photographs of the site in its heyday was reinstalled in 2010, making the site more visible from the nearby coastal road which runs on the opposite headland. Ornamental railings surrounding the lawn in front of the station have also been erected.

== Further development ==
In 2011/12 there was a large development project, following five years of fundraising and applying for various permissions. An extension was built on the rear of the building to provide the railway's first proper toilet facilities, disabled facilities and a store room fitted with a silent generator to provide power for the building. New paving was added to the patio area, ramped pathways to a new paved station platform area. The remaining area was landscaped with turf and appropriate shrubs were planted, and the time-expired station nameboards were replaced, along with new signage, fencing and station benches and CCTV. Inside the building was developed further as a free visitor centre with displays and artefacts depicting the history of the line and its restoration. It partially reopened for Easter 2012, and fully reopened as a Visitor Centre in May 2012.

== Zoo ==
The zoo that the station was built to serve pre-dates the railway by three years, having been established in 1893. A rocky inlet was dammed off to create a living environment for sea lions, and cages were constructed to house polar bears; and it was these attractions that gave the railway's locomotives their names. The zoo remained popular until the outbreak of the First World War when the zoo closed for the duration. When reopened in 1920 the polar bears were no longer a feature, but the sea lions survived until the complex closed at the end of the 1939 season, never to reopen.

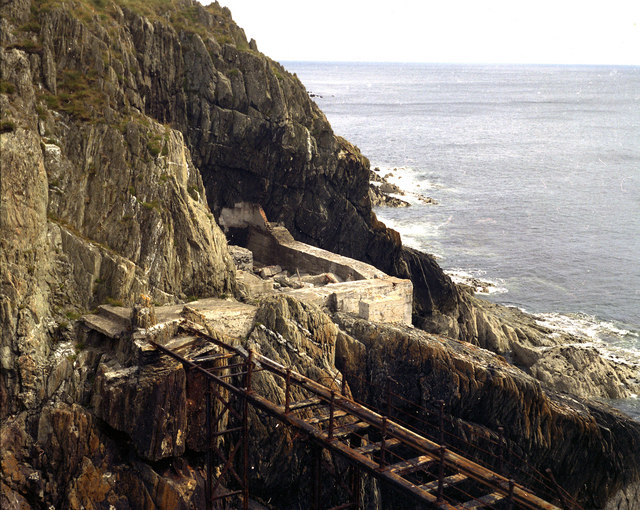

At various points during the zoo's life there were also brown bear cubs (which for a small fee could be taken for a walk around the cliffs), and an aviary with tropical birds, and it has also been reported that there were penguins, though no evidence has come to light to support this. The remains of the complex are still visible today. The site was used during the filming of an episode from the first series of the popular television drama Lovejoy in 1986 entitled Friends, Romans & Enemies. Today there are several images and displays in the nearby visitor centre and tea rooms which illustrate the zoo when it was open.

== Route ==
Preceding station	Heritage railways	Following station
Lime Kiln Halt towards Lhen Coan	Groudle Glen Railway	Terminus
