= Groudle Glen =

Coordinates: 54.1786°N 4.4301°W

- Location within the Isle of Man
- OS grid reference: SC415786
- Parish: Onchan
- Sheading: Garff
- Crown dependency: Isle of Man
- Post town: ISLE OF MAN
- Postcode district: IM4
- Dialling code: 01624
- Police: Isle of Man
- Fire: Isle of Man
- Ambulance: Isle of Man
- House of Keys: Garff

Groudle, or Groudle Glen, a glen on the outskirts of Onchan on the Isle of Man, is formed in a valley leading to the sea at the small port of the same name. It is one of the officially-listed Manx National Glens.

Groudle was a remote hamlet boasting only a handful of small cottages until linked to the Manx Electric Railway in 1893, at which time it was developed as a tourist attraction. Originally billed as "The Fern Land Of Mona!", the glen was further improved in the late 19th century by the planting of many different types of tree. Whereas most glens are formed naturally, it was a conscious effort by the owners to provide part of the attraction to the Victorian visitor by being able to inspect a wide variety of trees, something which is still evident today. At the beach there were bowling and croquet greens, a mill, crofters' cottages and a bridge accessing the Howstrake Holiday Camp which was on the adjacent headland. At the point where the pack-horse road (now a footpath) crosses the railway line there is an old lime kiln from which the intermediate railway station also takes its name.

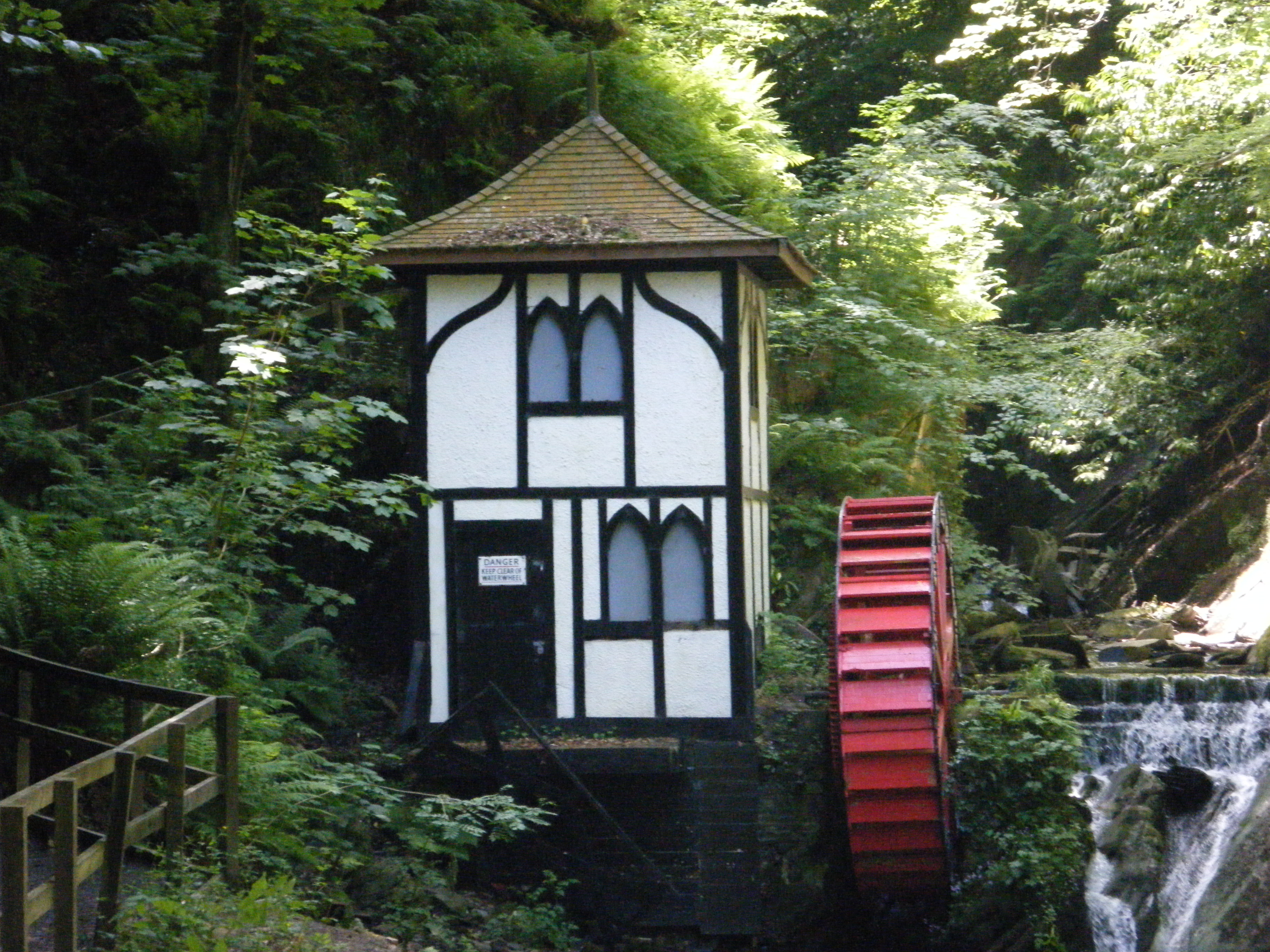
"Little Isabella" water wheel

About 60 yards below the "Little Isabella" wheel, still visible, is the ruin of the base of the refreshment kiosk, just across the stream by the old bandstand,(rebuilt on the site, but much smaller). In the 1920s this kiosk was run by Mona May Cannell (née Grose, in those days), of Laxey old village; she travelled to and from Laxey via the tram from South Cape each day. At the outer reaches of the glen a small cove was dammed off and a zoo built featuring sea lions and polar bears in 1893 and the remains of this remarkable construction remain in situ today as a testament to the incredible feat of engineering. To serve the zoo, in 1896 the Groudle Glen Railway was constructed over a three-quarter-mile length from the depths of the glen onto the headland. This resulted in the outer station being named "Sea Lion Rocks", a name it still carries today. Described since as the "Alton Towers of its day", the glen featured many attractions for the discerning Victorian visitor, from a dance floor and bandstand, to fortune tellers, many stalls, a playground, water wheel (known as the "Little Isabella", a reference to the world-famous Laxey Wheel which is a short distance away) and the narrow gauge railway. As trends changed, so did the fortunes of the glen and it never really recovered after World War II, with the railway being the sole surviving attraction. The line closed in 1962 and the glen returned to a tranquil footpath for the next twenty years, at which point the railway was restored by volunteers.

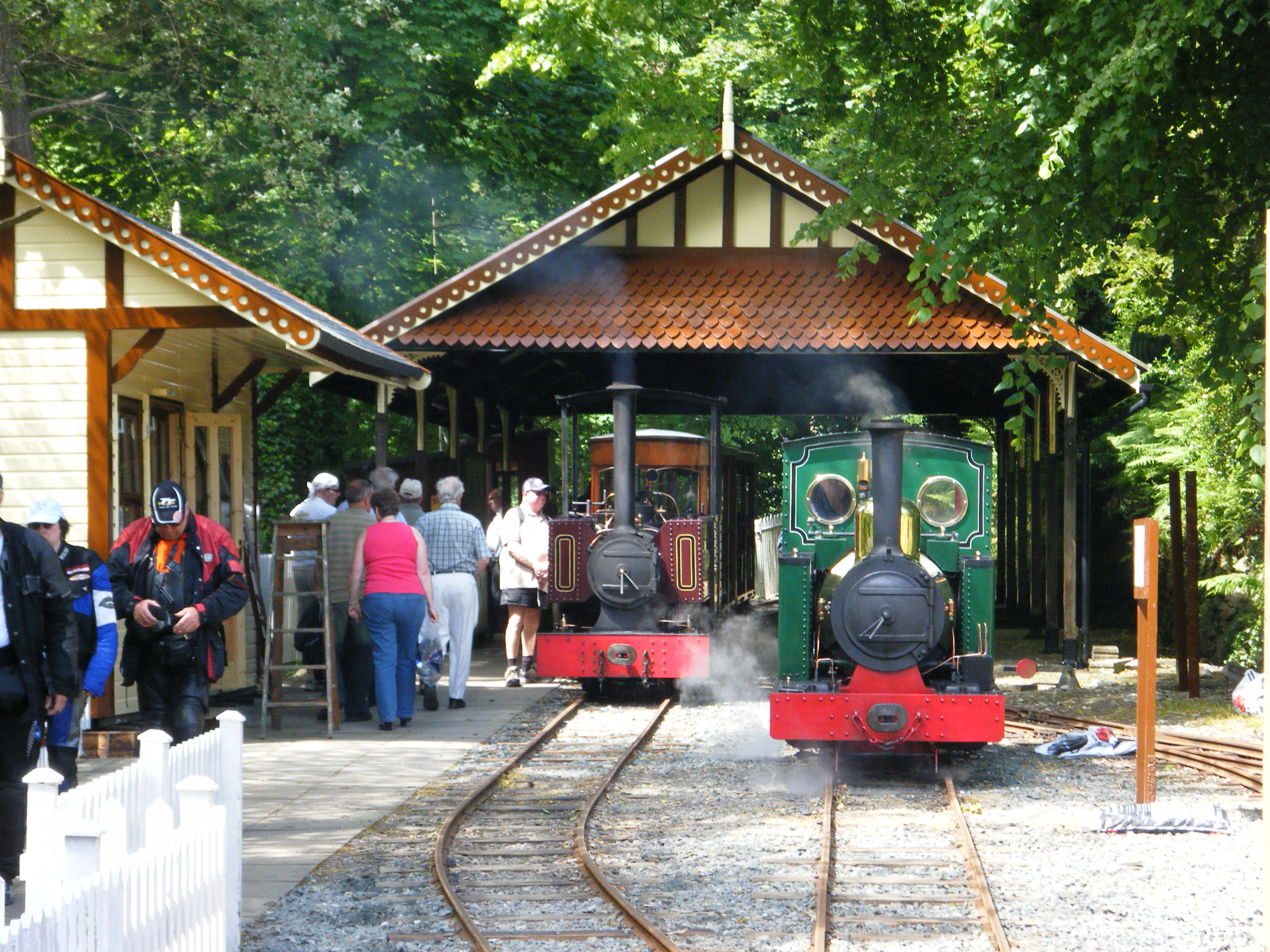
Groudle Glen Railway

The glen itself runs from the Whitebridge in Onchan to the sea at Port Groudle and is still open to the public today, although the majority of the attractions, save for the restored railway, have all but disappeared. The water wheel is extant and the old dance floor was replaced in 1993 with a new bandstand structure. The glen has the only natural canyon on the island, the "Lhen Coan", which is Manx Gaelic for "Lonely Valley" (sometimes rendered inaccurately as "Lovely Glen", "Lonely Glen", Lovely Valley" etc.). In the lower (seaward) section of the glen, which is now in private ownership, were lily ponds that the accessed by the public by a series of winding boarded walkways. Having fallen into disrepair for many years the ponds were substantially refurbished by the Manx Heritage Trust in 1986 which was deemed to be "Heritage Year" on the island, but since this time the maintenance has not been kept up and the ponds are not easily accessible. The railway still operates in the summer months and now has a visitors centre nearby to the old zoo with tea rooms.

In 2020 the 'Little Isabella' waterwheel and its wheelhouse were restored back to working condition thanks to the intervention of mining engineering firm MMD, in memory of their founders.

== See also ==
- Groudle Glen Railway
- Groudle Glen railway station
- List of Manx Electric Railway stations
- Manx National Glens
