= Groudle Glen Railway =

Narrow gauge railway in the Isle of Man

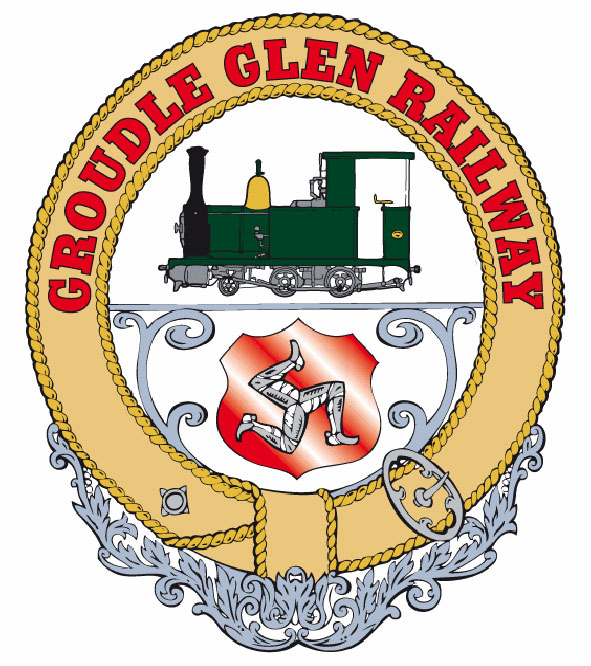
- Locale: Isle of Man
- Terminus: Lhen Coan and Sea Lion Rocks
- Coordinates: 54.176292°N 4.421360°W
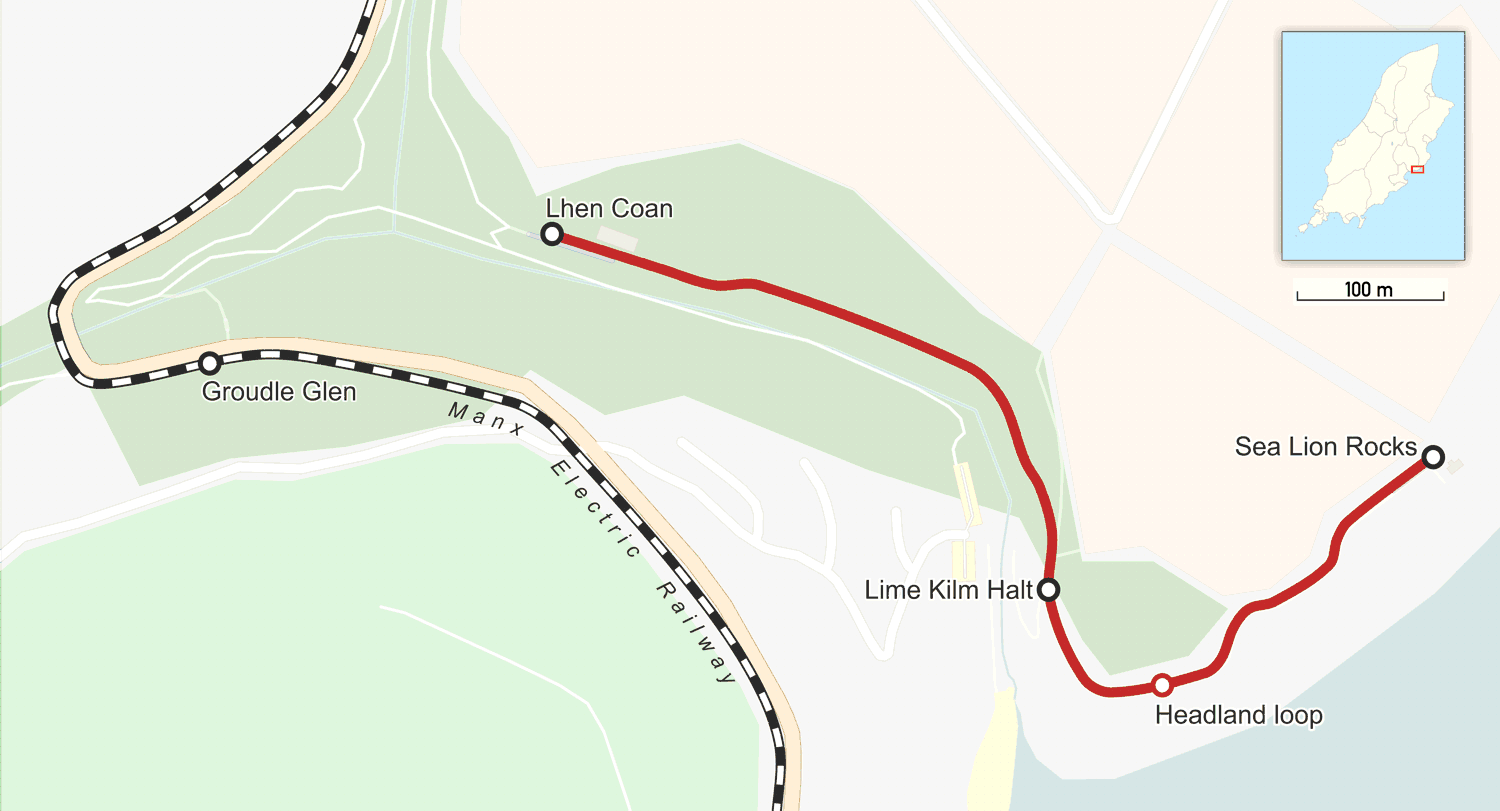
- Route map (Click to expand)

Commercial operations
- Name: Groudle Glen Railway

Preserved operations
- Stations: 2 plus 1 halt
- Length: 0.9 km (0.56 mi)

Commercial history
- Opened: 1896
- Closed: 1962

Preservation history
- 1982: Restoration commences
- 1983: Short section opens for Santa Train
- 1986: Official re-opening
- 1987: Sea Lion returns
- 2007: 25 years since the re-opening
- 2013: Brown Bear appeal launched

The Groudle Glen Railway is a 2 ft (610 mm) narrow gauge railway near Onchan in the Isle of Man, on the boundary of Onchan and Lonan, which is owned and operated by a small group of enthusiastic volunteers and operates on summer Sundays; May to September and Wednesday evenings in July and August along with a number of annual special events.

== History ==
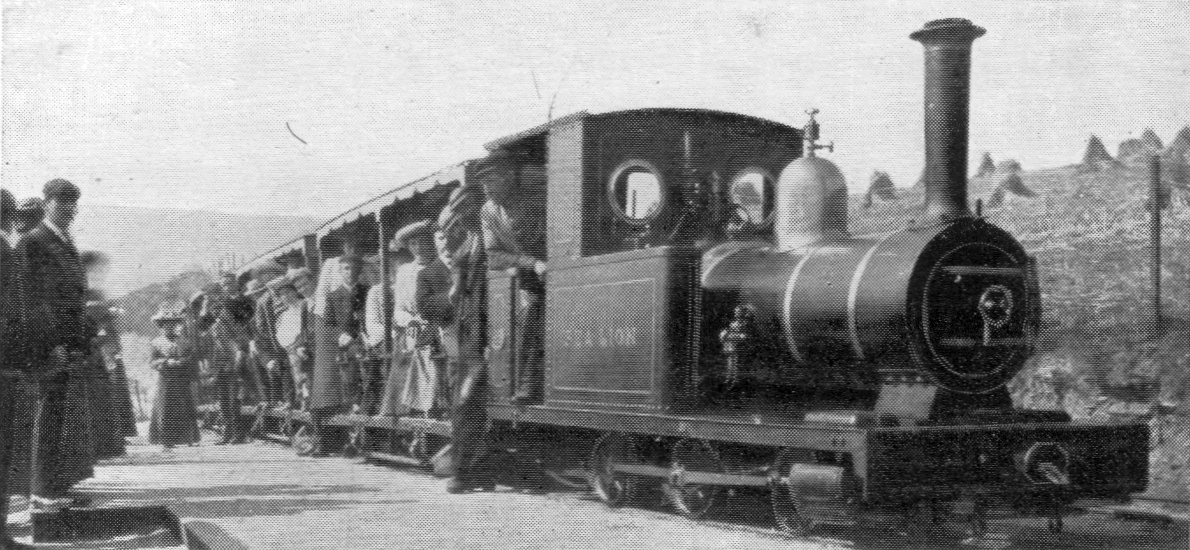
Sea Lion, around 1910

=== 1896–1939 ===
The line was built in the late Victorian era to cater for a new demand for transport down Groudle Glen after the opening of the Manx Electric Railway. A zoo was built, and the Groudle Glen Railway connected to it. The 2 ft (610 mm) narrow gauge line ran from the upper part of the glen, Lhen Coan, to the zoo at Sea Lion Rocks. The line opened on 23 May 1896 and initially operated with a single locomotive, called Sea Lion, and three coaches. The locomotive was built by W.G. Bagnall Ltd. of Castle Engine Works, Stafford. The line became so popular that a second locomotive, Polar Bear and additional coaches were purchased. The railway operated successfully until the outbreak of the First World War, when all services ceased and the zoo was closed. After the war, the zoo re-opened and the locomotives were overhauled and returned to service, but by 1921 they had been replaced with battery-operated locomotives. These proved unreliable and the original steam locomotives were again overhauled and returned to service. The railway closed again during the Second World War and the zoo closed for good. A landslide during the war years meant that services could not return to the original terminus.

=== 1950–1981 ===
The line took some time to re-open after the war; with the zoo closed, the glen was less frequently visited. Only one locomotive returned for the 1950 season. Over the next twelve years the seasons were of variable length and no timetable was officially issued. The final season was 1962, with Polar Bear by then inoperable. The final two seasons were known as the "fairground era" as the stock was painted in loud colours with blue and red dominating, and fairground-style lettering and lining applied to the locomotive. By the late 1960s the engines had been removed from the glen. Polar Bear was restored to working condition at Amberley Working Museum, West Sussex. Sea Lion went to Kirk Michael railway station on static display, before moving to Loughborough.

=== 1982–1991 ===
In 1982, the Isle of Man Steam Railway Supporters' Association launched a plan to restore the line, and work began clearing twenty years worth of undergrowth covering the trackbed. In December 1983, a short section from the old lime kiln to the headland opened, running Santa Trains. Further sections of the line were relaid, eventually reaching the glen terminus at Lhen Coan. A station was created at the headland with run-round facilities. The complete railway was officially re-opened on 23 May 1986 by Carolyn Rawson as part of the Manx Heritage Year and a tree planted to mark the event in Lhen Coan station. In September 1987, original steam locomotive Sea Lion returned to the railway after a full restoration. By 1991 it was decided to relay the final section of the line from the headland loop to the former terminus at Sea Lion Rocks. The run-round loop was lifted at the end of the 1991 season when the major earthworks began to relay the railway to the outer terminus.

=== 1992–2002 ===
The extension, recreating the line to its original three quarter-mile length, was opened on 23 July 1992, and in 1993 the distinctive Swiss-style station canopy at Lhen Coan, a feature of so many postcards of the glen, opened as part of the Year of Railways celebration. In 1993 Polar Bear also returned to the glen for a visit. It was a time of great change for the line, with many improvements being introduced by the volunteers. Visiting locomotives were a feature in 1995 (Chaloner and Rishra) and in 1998 as part of the Steam 125 event marking the anniversary of the island's main railway. Planning permission was granted in 1999 for the volunteers to erect a replacement station building at Sea Lion Rocks, and by summer 2000 work was well in hand. The station building opened in 2001, and in 2003 the interior of the station was completed; this proved to be the major draw to the railway, aside from the unique steam locomotives. The station and surrounding area have since received much attention as ongoing projects, and the development of the site has also revived interest in the once popular zoo, whose remains can still be seen from the station site.

=== 2003–2009 ===
The addition of a replica battery electric locomotive in 2003 completed the line's historical line-up of locomotives, and a return visit from Polar Bear for her own centenary in 2005 was repaid by Sea Lion making her first trip to Amberley Museum in the same year. In 2007 a new purpose-built locomotive shed was erected on the site of the original, but to a larger scale, and a mess hut was installed, which transformed the station at Lhen Coan, in keeping with the original site. In September 2007 a plaque was unveiled at Lhen Coan station to mark the 25th anniversary of the restoration. This event also marked the official opening by Annie Craine MHK of the railway's new purpose-built locomotive shed. Plans were well in hand to rebuild the souvenir shop at Lhen Coan in a style similar to the distinctive station canopy, and in late 2008 the previous incarnation was dismantled in readiness for the erection of the new, pre-fabricated version on the same site. A mock signal box was also completed to cover the side of the volunteers' mess room, and by December 2008 work was in hand to close the shop for good after the Santa Trains. The new shop opened fully for Easter 2010 and now dominates the station site.

=== 2010–present ===
In 2010 an appeal was launched to raise the £60,000 required to extend the Sea Lion Rocks Tea Rooms to provide toilet facilities, a power supply and improved patio area. This was completed in time for the Easter 2012 services, and was re-opened by Allan Bell MHK, the island's Chief Minister, in May 2012 to mark the 30th anniversary of the railway's restoration. During the 2012 season planning permission was granted to enlarge the platform area at Lhen Coan station and to construct a new utility building to replace the time-expired tea hut, which was demolished after Christmas 2011. Construction work started in September, funded by the Manx Lottery Trust and Tower Insurance, and required the railway to transport 140 tons of rock to the site, for the platform extension foundations and infill. New stone faced walls to link the 2007 engine shed to the existing 1896 dry stone wall were also part of the project. The building was constructed by volunteer joiner Stephen Goody to match the style of the canopy, shop and booking office, and the entire area was completed in time for the Christmas services.

== Stations ==
Point	Coordinates (Links to map resources)	OS Grid Ref	Notes
Lhen Coan	54.1789°N 4.4269°W	SC41707862	
Lime Kiln Halt	54.1764°N 4.4215°W	SC42057833	
Headland	54.1759°N 4.4202°W	SC42137827	Temporary terminus
Sea Lion Rocks	54.1773°N 4.4171°W	SC42347842	

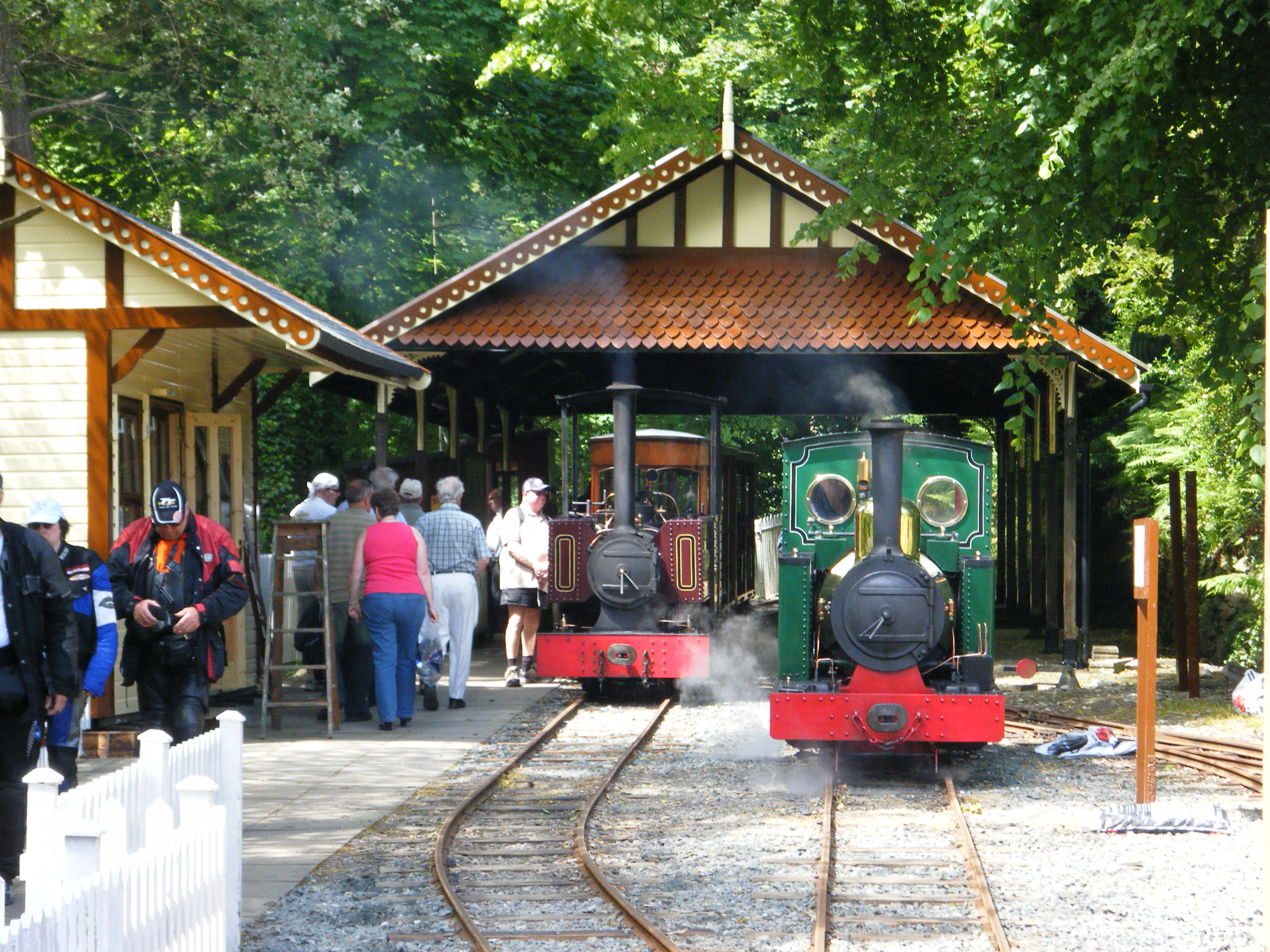
A busy scene at Lhen Coan station in June 2009 with Annie (left) & the original Sea Lion (right) both in service.

Despite being under one mile long, the railway does have intermediate stations, although only one of them is still operational for passengers and the other forms the site of the current passing loop when two trains are in operation (this was extended in 2011 to allow trains with more coaches to pass each other unhindered); the outer terminus is home to the visitor centre whilst the inner station houses all the running sheds and the railway's workshops.

- Lhen Coan Station, the lower glen terminus, also the location of the railway's loco and carriage works.
- Lime Kiln Halt, the only intermediate halt on the railway, the halfway point
- Headland Station, now closed, one-time terminus of the line prior to 1991
- Sea Lion Rocks, outer terminus on the cliffs above the old zoo

Each of the railway's stations is now colour-coded, with all station furniture, waiting shelters, etc., in a corresponding scheme. The terminus at Lhen Coan is in brown and cream (similar to Great Western Railway stations), with Lime Kiln Halt in a green scheme (similar to the Southern Railway) and Sea Lion Rocks in a bright shade of red/maroon. In the past each station was decorated in a house style of deep brown and cream throughout the period 1991–2000, changing to individual station colour schemes thereafter, although individual shades used have varied since this time.

== Operations ==
=== Seasonal ===
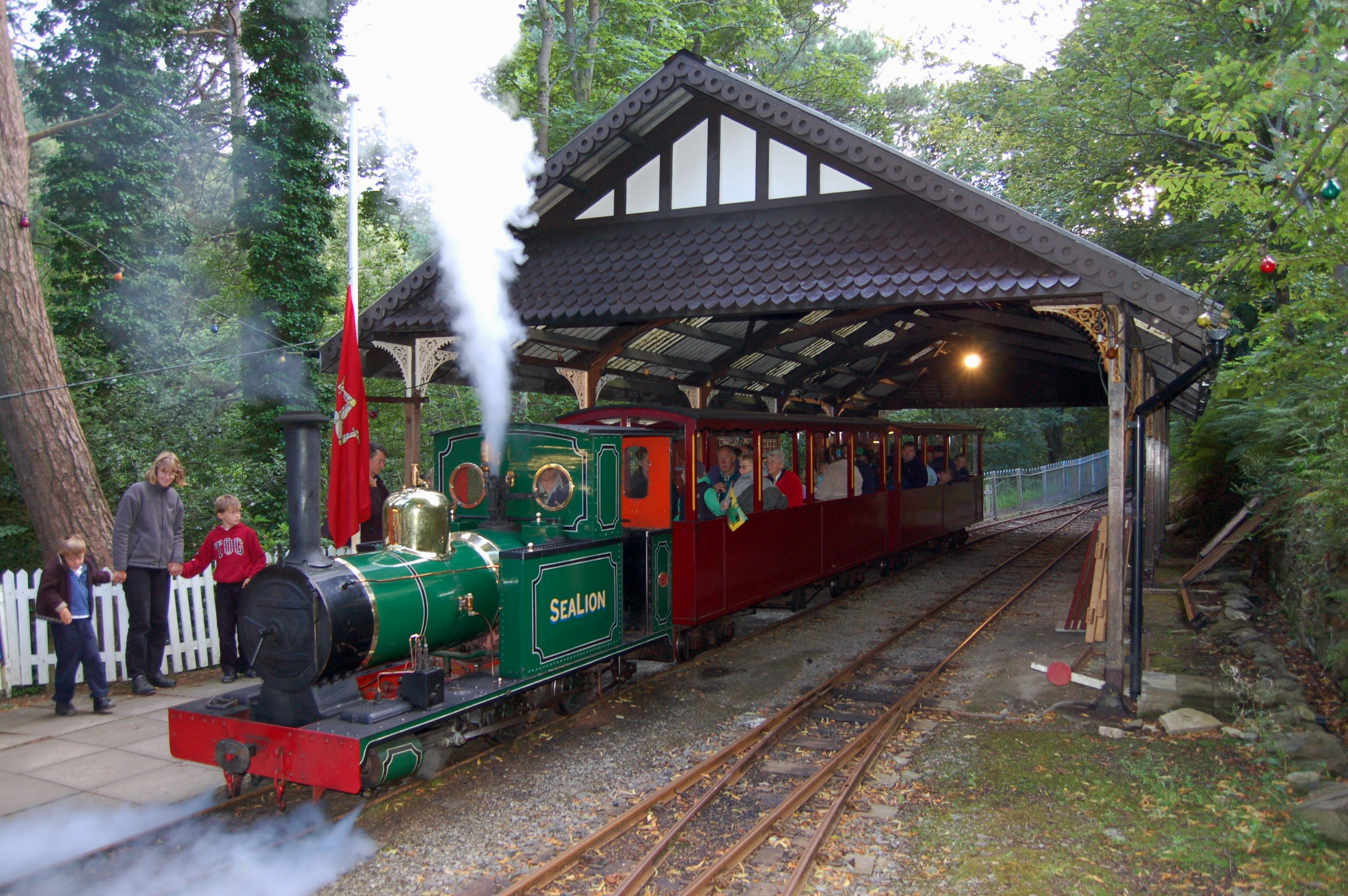
Sea Lion about to depart from Lhen Coan with an evening service, August 2006.

When it originally opened in 1896 the line ran a very intense all-day every-day service in season. A fourth coach was ordered within the first year to cope with demand, followed by a further locomotive and four coaches eight years later.

Today the railway operates to a set timetable annually with trains running every Sunday between May and September, with the first train at 11:00 am and the final departure at 4:30 pm. Additional evening services operate between 7:00 pm and 9:00 pm on Wednesdays in July and August, and on Tuesdays in August only. One of the resident steam locomotives is in service wherever possible for each of the advertised operating days. When the line first re-opened services were also provided on bank holidays and public holidays, but this practice has been discontinued in more recent years. As part of the involvement with the Year of Railways in 1993 and subsequent anniversaries, the line has operated daily for periods of up to one week, the last being as part of Steam 125 in 1998 when visiting locomotives were in attendance. The railway's current standard timetable can be found at its website including details of special services.

=== Christmas ===
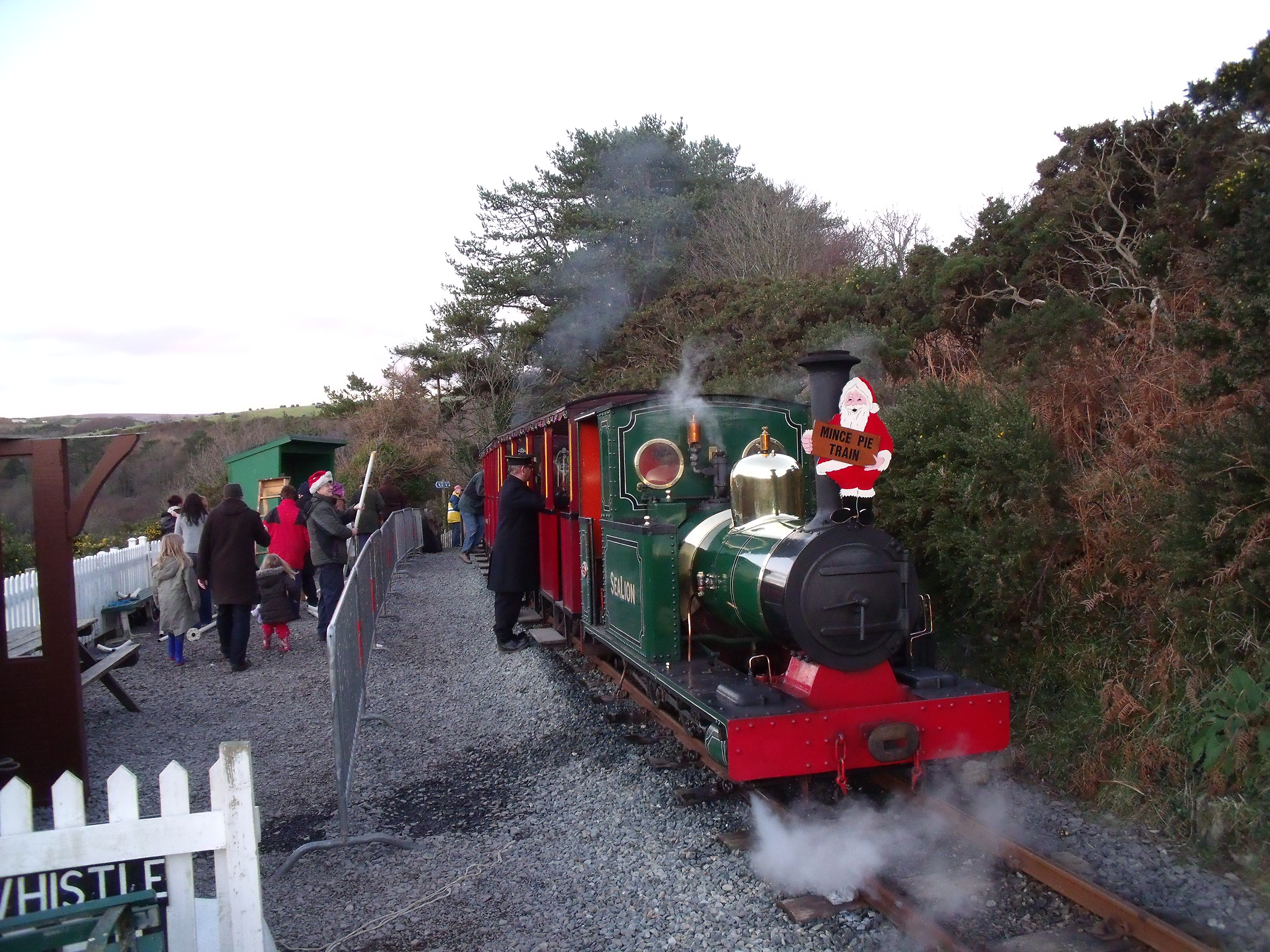
A "Mince Pie Special" at Lime Kiln Halt. Boxing Day 2008

The first services ever operated on the newly restored railway were the Santa Trains in 1983 which have since proved to be the highlight of the line's calendar; they began life as one day of operation the weekend before Christmas Day but today these extend to two weekends of trains, which are the railway's busiest period of the year, culminating in the popular Mince Pie Trains which are a regular fixture each Boxing Day when many locals visit the line for a return journey and a seasonal drink and mince pie. The station at Lhen Coan is transformed into a grotto area for these services and the volunteers spend many hours preparing the site for the festive services. Until the arrival of Annie, one of the railway's two diesel locomotives was renamed as "Blitzen" for the day; originally the traditional name of "Rudolph" was applied but this was changed in 1997 following requests. The services are now annually hauled by Sea Lion and Annie. Such is the continued success of these seasonal services that the railway introduced online pre-booking in 2010 for the first time, and now operate them over four days during the festive period.

=== Easter ===
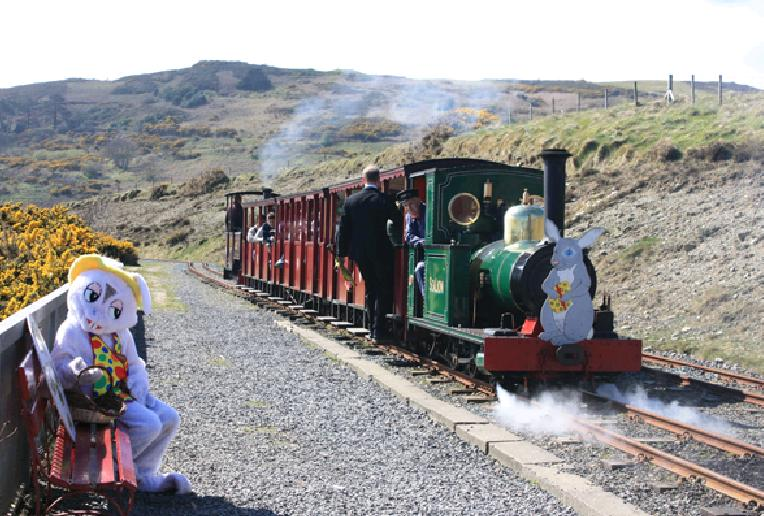
Easter Bunny Train

Since the restoration of the railway began the line has always opened for the Easter weekend but the bunny trains only commenced in 1997 and were introduced following a request for them from the Isle of Man Hospice Care which has close ties with the railway, the train services being provided free of charge. However, following the success of the venture, the next year the railway embarked on its own special event operating the Easter Bunny Trains and they became an immediate success, with the full line being utilised (rather than the glen section which is used at Christmas). The railway usually operates a two train service, with trains passing at the headland loop, the Easter Bunny is on hand to distribute chocolate eggs at the outer terminus and free tea, coffee and orange is included in the ticket price along with entry to the Easter Egg Hunt. These services which operate on Easter Sunday and Monday are second only to the Santa Trains as the line's busiest services.

=== Jester Express ===
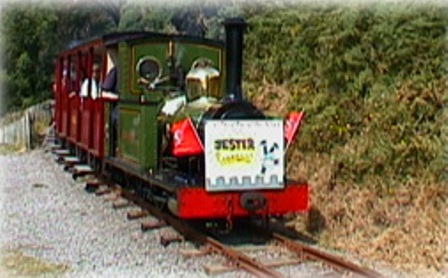
The Jester Express

As part of the railway's fundraising drive for a new station building at Sea Lion Rocks terminus some special event days were run at weekends in either July or August, during the school summer holidays, for three years from 2000 to 2002. The outer terminus of the line at Sea Lion Rocks was transformed into an Arthurian themed area for the day, with two volunteers (acting as train guards) dressed as jesters, much to the amusement of the children, and a bouncy castle presided over by Merlin, and King Arthur in attendance to greet children; a set of stocks were the biggest draw for the children however, and these trains were very popular with local residents, with associated stalls, raffles and light refreshments being made available. A shortage of volunteer labour in subsequent years resulted in this innovative family day being dropped from the railway's calendar, but the event returned for the 2010–2013 seasons... but has been dropped from the 2014 timetable as the special events calendar becomes more varied.

=== Other events ===
As part of a new drive to attract more local visitors to the line and to recruit new volunteers to run the line, a wide programme of special events were introduced for the 2010 season. Alongside the annual Easter Bunny Trains and Santa Specials, the Jester Express Fun Day returned in July, alongside the new Diesel & Electric Day in May, the Father's Day Trains in June and the Teddy Bear's Picnic in August. The Teddy Bear's Picnic wasn't repeated due to competition from the Government railways own event not making it financially viable. Another new initiative for 2010 was the introduction of Driver Experience sessions, bookable by the railway's website, a 2-hour session on the footplate of locomotive Annie is offered as a hands on experience. Despite the level of interest shown in the driver experiences, it was proving prohibitively costly and the sessions aren't to be repeated in 2013. A new special event for 2011 was the summer Cliff Top Concerts, supported by the Isle of Man Arts Council. A day of free open-air concerts from Manx groups and musicians were performed at Sea Lion Rocks, this event was deemed a great success and has been repeated every year since. The 2013 season sees further development of the Special Events calendar with new events planned such as the Wag 'n' Train with the Manx S.P.C.A., outdoor Church Services by the Sea and the "Frocks on the Rocks" with the Women's Institute.

== Rolling stock ==
=== Locomotives ===
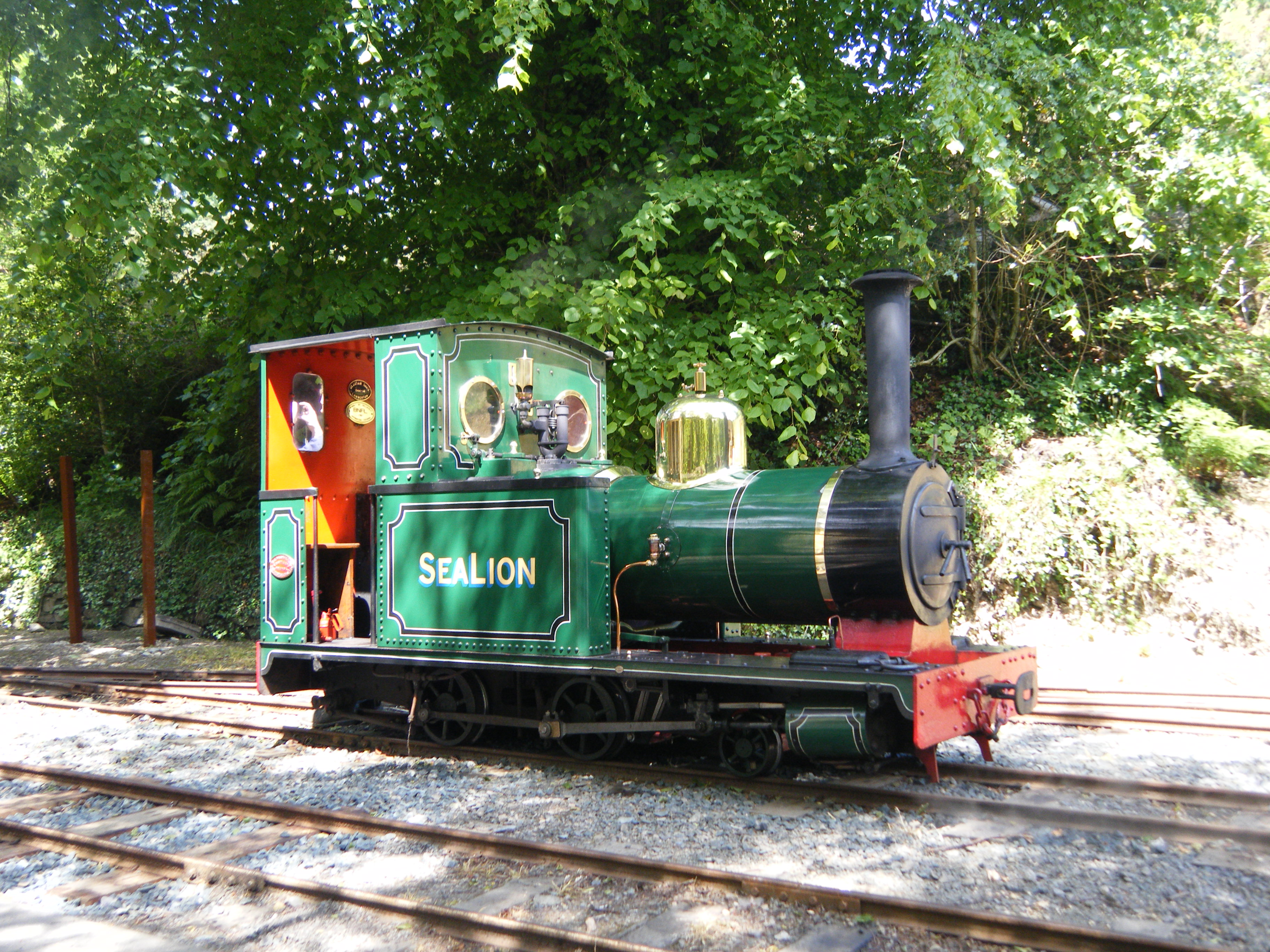
Sea Lion (1896)

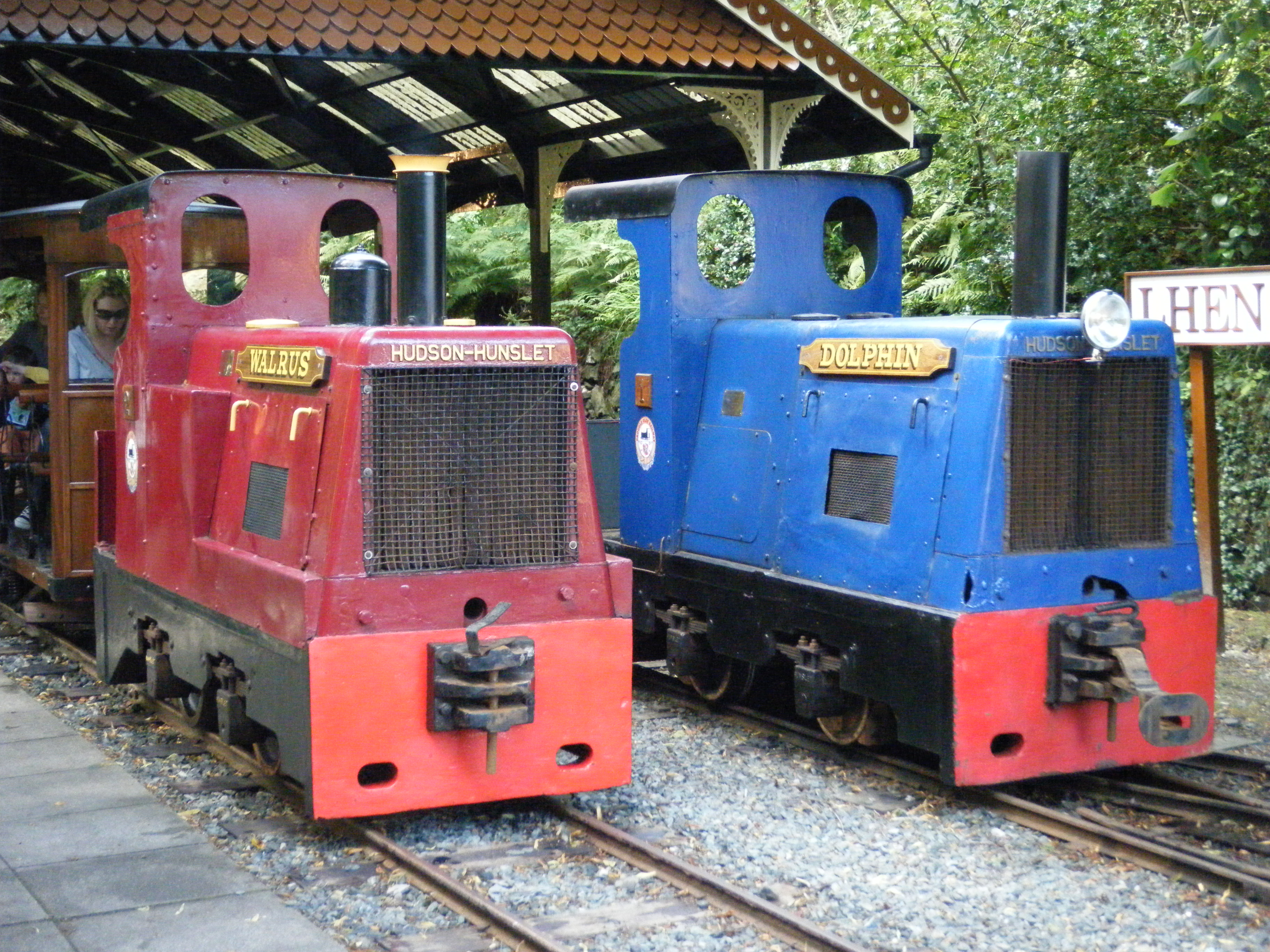
Dolphin & Walrus (1952)

The original steam locomotive Sea Lion remains in regular service. The railway also has two replica locomotives Brown Bear and Annie, three diesel locomotives and a replica battery electric locomotive. In the past there have been further locomotives, most notably Polar Bear, sister to Sea Lion, two original battery electric locomotives and several visitors.

Since restoration a number of visiting locomotives have operated on the line, including Kerr Stuart Peter Pan in 1991, Rishra and Chaloner from the Leighton Buzzard Narrow Gauge Railway in 1995 as part of the International Railway Festival in conjunction with the centenary of the Snaefell Mountain Railway, Quarry Hunslet locomotive Jonathan in 1998. Chaloner and the line's other original locomotive, Polar Bear returned in 1993 as part of the Year of Railways. Polar Bear returned in 1996 for the railway's centenary and again in 2005 for her own 100th birthday. Since being sold in 1996, Jack made one return visit in 1999.

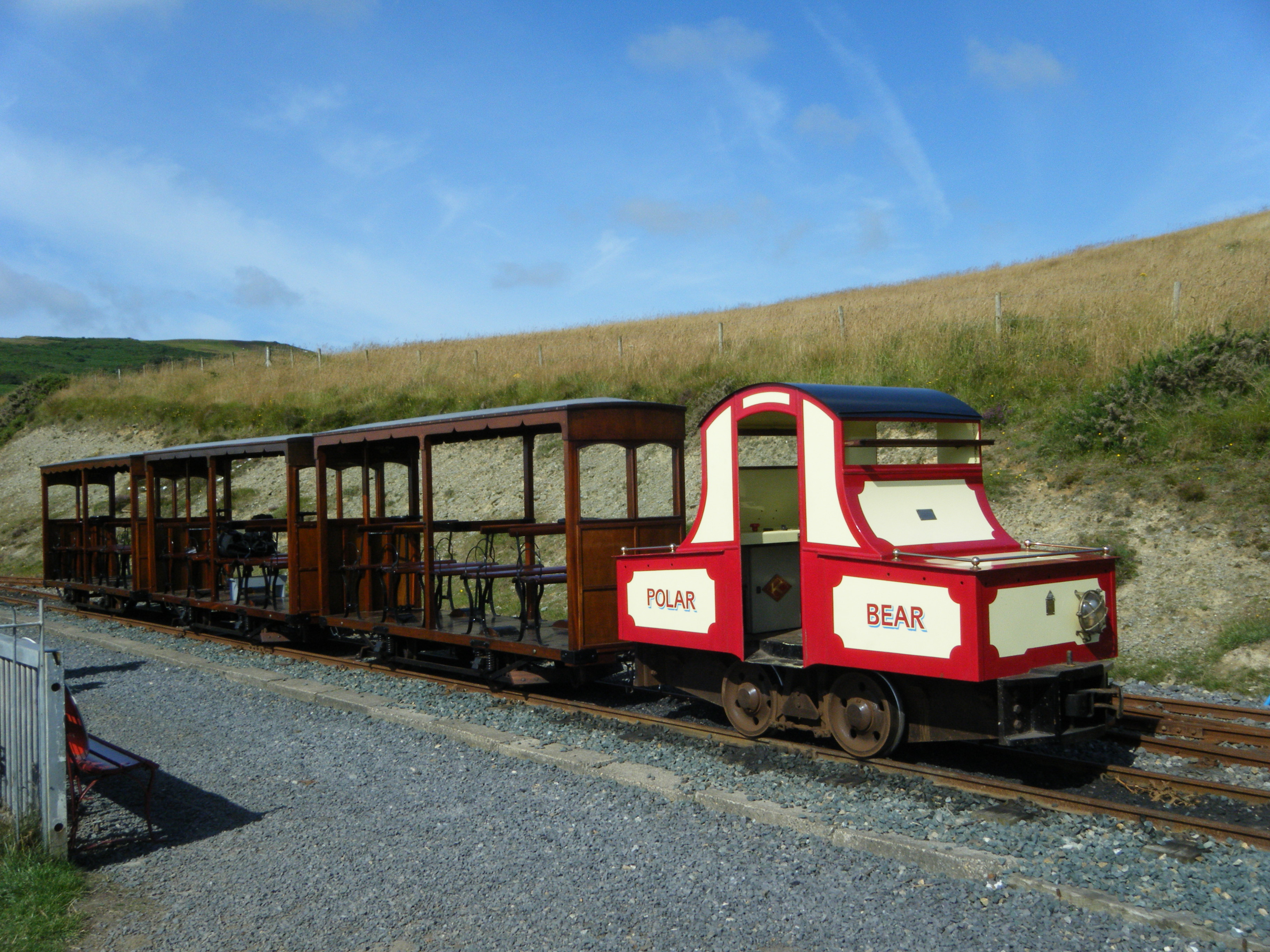
Polar Bear and Toastrack set

=== Carriages ===
The railway originally had a total of eight four-wheeled coaches delivered in three batches; three were delivered in 1896 for the opening of the railway followed by one more soon afterwards to cope with passenger demand, and a further batch of four arrived in 1905 with the second locomotive. Several parts of these vehicles were saved from the site after closure, resulting in the ultimate restoration of many of the coaches both on the railway and off-island.

The restored railway now operates with a set of three bogie coaches built between 1985 and 1994 by the railway's volunteers on two second hand underframes from Doddington and a new steel underframe constructed in 1993. The railway also has a restored set of four of the original four-wheeled toastrack coaches which are used for special services. In 2014 it was announced that the railway's three main bogie coaches built in the 1980s/90s were becoming life-expired and beyond economic repair, so thanks to Lottery funding three new bogie coaches have been constructed on new frames and incorporate facilities for wheelchair passengers. These coaches came into service for Christmas 2014.

=== Non-passenger stock ===
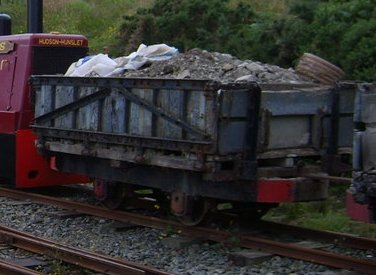
Fauld "Bomb" Wagon

The original line had no goods vehicles. At least one of the original four-wheeled toastrack coaches had its bodywork removed and was used to carry stock for the Headland Cafe below the line's later terminus.

When restoration began a set of six "bomb" wagons from RAF Fauld were purchased, to help with track laying, though only five were used. All remained on site after reconstruction until 2011, when they were deemed beyond repair and scrapped, with the wheelsets retained. In 2012 two wheelsets were incorporated into a new-build, four-wheeled flat wagon nicknamed "FAT 1", which was used as a base for the construction of Brown Bear.

After the 2014 bogie coaches entered service, the underframe from the old bogie coach 3 was converted into a flat wagon for use on works trains.

=== Modern stock ===
A series of four-wheeled and bogie flat wagons, a large second-hand four-wheeled brake van and a tipper wagon were acquired for maintenance work. To replace a variety of four-wheel wagons that were time-expired, a new bogie works van was delivered to the line in 2011 for use by permanent way crews. This features an open wagon and covered accommodation area.

As part of 1998's Steam 125 celebration, the railway played host to a hand-made rail bike built by Dr Karl Pischl in Austria.

== See also ==
- Isle of Man Steam Railway Supporters' Association
- Manx Electric Railway stations
- British narrow gauge railways
