= Geology of the Isle of Man =

The geology of the Isle of Man consists primarily of a thick pile of sedimentary rocks dating from the Ordovician period, together with smaller areas of later sedimentary and extrusive igneous strata. The older strata was folded and faulted during the Caledonian and Acadian orogenies The bedrock is overlain by a range of glacial and post-glacial deposits. Igneous intrusions in the form of dykes and plutons are common, some associated with mineralisation which spawned a minor metal mining industry.

== Ordovician and Silurian ==
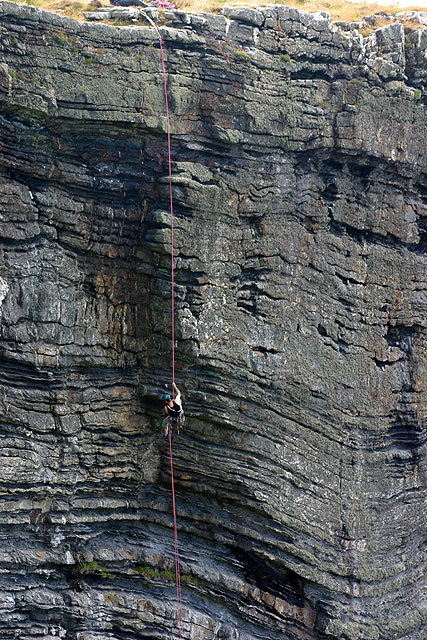
Layers of Ordovician sandstone of the Mull Hill Formation at The Chasms near the southwest end of the island

The larger part of the island is formed from rocks of Ordovician age which were traditionally known as the Manx Slates but are now referred by geologists to the Manx Group. The relationships between the various different formations which constitute this sequence is often obscured by faulting but the sequence is considered to be:

- Creggan Mooar Formation (youngest)
- Glen Rushen Formation
- Injebreck Formation
- Barrule Formation
- Maughold Formation
- Creg Agneash Formation
- Mull Hill Formation
- Lonan Formation
- Glen Dhoo Formation (oldest)

All of these formations are of Arenig age with the exception of the lowermost which is Tremadocian. The Group is the equivalent of north-west England's Skiddaw Group and south-east Ireland's Ribband Group. The Manx Group is poorly fossiliferous but acritarchs and graptolite provide some insight into the succession's biostratigraphy. The succession has been subject to low-grade metamorphism. A microgabbro was intruded into rocks of the Creggan Mooar Formation to the east of Peel during this period. Manx Group sandstones were used in the construction of Peel Castle. Snaefell, the high point of the Isle of Man, together with the ridge extending north-eastwards to the island's second highest summit, North Barrule are formed from the mudstones of the Barrule Formation. The same rocks also form the summit of South Barrule, highest summit in the south of the island. A celebrated site in the far south is 'The Chasms' where large fissures have opened up in the coastal cliffs of the Mull Hill Formation's quartz-arenites. Nearby Spanish Head and the Calf of Man are formed from Lonan Formation rocks.

Also included traditionally within the Manx Slates are a group of Silurian age rocks which outcrop along the coast between Niarbyl Point and Peel and which are nowadays referred to as the Niarbyl Formation. The Niarbyl rocks which were found on the basis of a graptolite discovery, to be of Wenlock age as recently as 1997 constitute the sole formation within the Dalby Group. This group equates with a part of the Windermere Supergroup in the southern Lake District and the Riccarton Group in southern Scotland.

=== Ordovician/Silurian intrusives ===
A suite of dykes of Ordovician to Silurian age have been intruded into the rocks of the Manx and Dalby groups. Other than some exposed hillsides and stream sections they are not readily encountered inland but are well exposed along the rocky shores of the island south of Ramsey in the east and Kirk Michael in the west. Most common are metabasite dykes with a broadly NE-SW alignment. Dykes of a broadly similar age of granodiorite and microgranite are also to be found. The Dhoon pluton is composed of Ordovician/Silurian age granodiorite. It is exposed on the eastern flanks of Slieau Ruy west of the hamlet and also to the east where it has been quarried. The Oatlands pluton near Santon to the southwest of Douglas is formed from granite and microgabbro-diorite. A flooded quarry is a legacy of its previous exploitation at this site. There may be a granite batholith beneath the island.

== Devonian ==
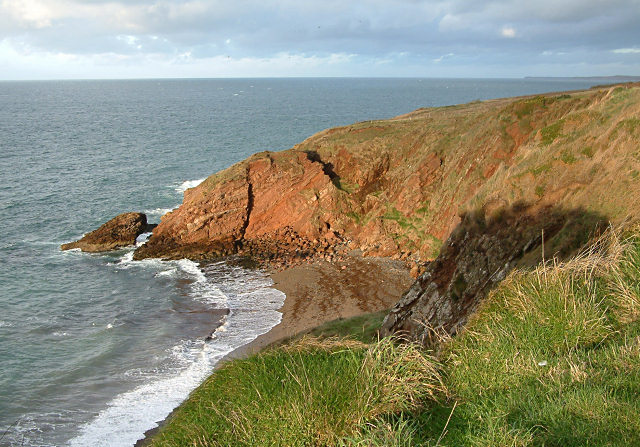
Sandstone, part of the Peel Group, at Periwinkle Bay near Peel

Reddish-brown sandstones of the Peel Group of early Devonian age are exposed along the coast for a mile north-east of Peel. These rocks extend for up to a mile inland but are covered by sands and gravels. The sequence, estimated to be between 500 and 2000m thick, is fluvial and aeolian in origin. It also contains conglomerates, and some concretionary limestone or calcretes which represent fossil soil horizons. A scatter of diorite and lamprophyre dykes were emplaced during the early Devonian, the latter within the Niarbyl Formation rocks south of Peel. The Foxdale granite pluton was also emplaced at this time. It is worked at a quarry within the Stoney Mountain Plantation south-east of Foxdale village.

== Carboniferous ==
A suite of sedimentary rocks was deposited during the Carboniferous period, the oldest being the Tournaisian age conglomerates, breccias and sandstones of the Langness Conglomerate Formation. These were succeeded in the Visean by a variety of limestones assigned to the Great Scar Limestone Group and finally by a range of rocks which compose the Craven Group. The limestones were formed in the Eubonia Basin, occupied by a tropical sea as the Isle of Man was situated at the equator at this time. The only onshore representatives of this basin succession, these strata are found within three miles of Castletown; inland exposures are few but these rocks are well exposed along the coast between Kentraugh, east of St Mary and the Santon Burn south-east of Ballasalla.

Carboniferous rocks underlie the thick recent deposits north of Ramsey and around Andreas but are nowhere seen at the surface. At the top of the Carboniferous sequence, a suite of igneous rocks which outcrop on the eastern side of Bay ny Carrickey opposite Port St Mary which include tuffs, pillow lavas and debris flows are collected together as the Scarlett Volcanic Member. A number of basaltic and microgabbro dykes are thought to have been intruded into the Palaeozoic country rock during the Carboniferous period.

== Permo-Trias ==
Sandstones and mudstones from these two periods underlie the northernmost part of the island but are entirely obscured by thick Quaternary deposits.

== Palaeogene ==
Olivine microgabbro dykes of Palaeogene age and with a broad NW-SE alignment are commonly exposed around the island's rocky coasts. A thick dyke in the north is connected to the Fleetwood Dyke as part of an en echelon series; this and other Palaeogene dykes appear to be associated with an igneous centre in Northern Ireland.

== Geological structures ==
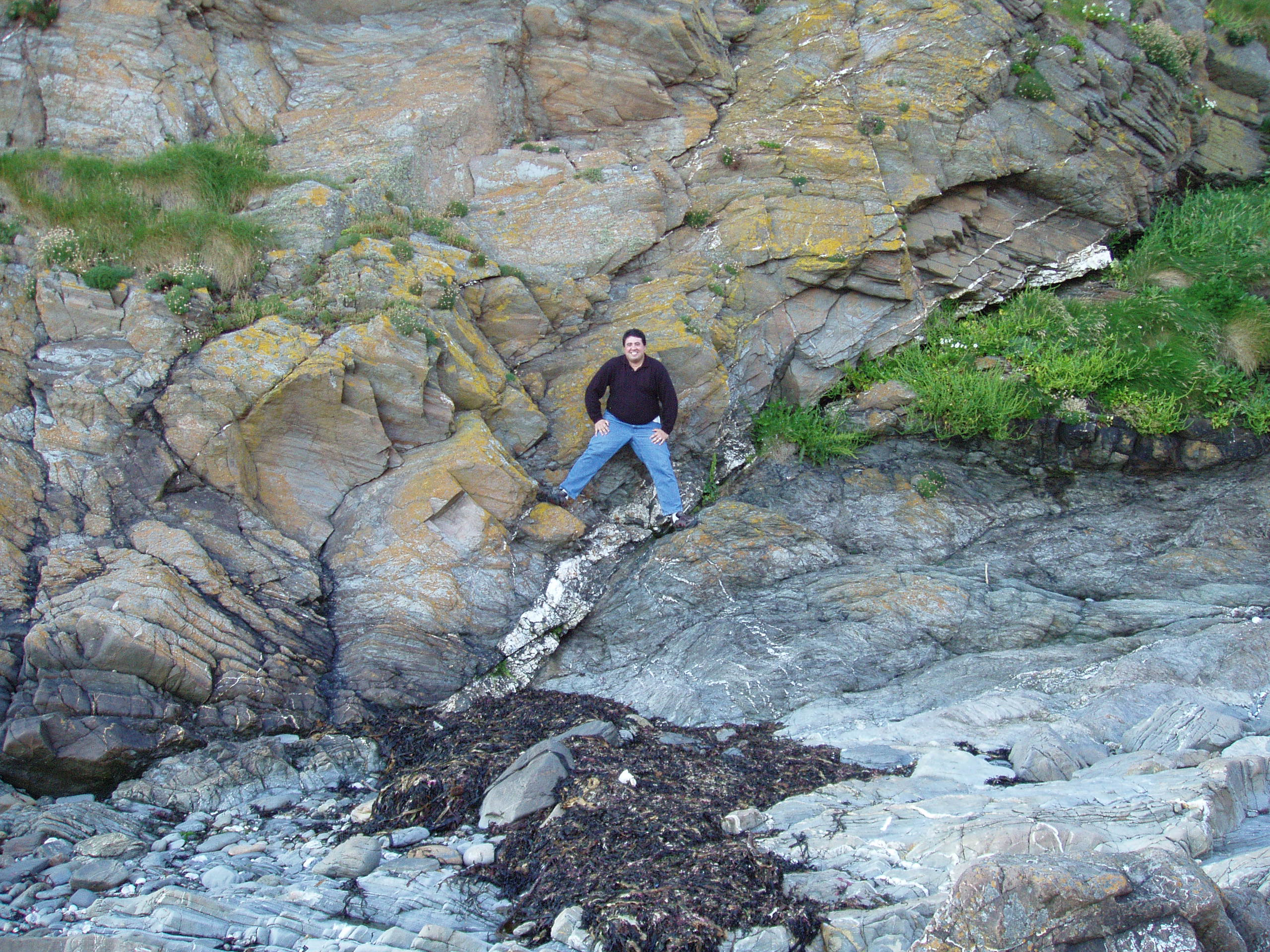
The Niarbyl Fault marks the Iapetus Suture on the Isle of Man. The rocks at top and left formed in Laurentia but the rocks at lower right formed in Gondwana

The lower Palaeozoic rocks i.e. Ordovician and Silurian are intensely folded. Two main phases of deformation are recognised and usually considered to be Acadian, with deformation including the presence of shear zones being most intense in the west. They are also cut by faults developed largely on Caledonoid lines i.e. with a north-east to southwest orientation. Some multi-kilometre scale folds are named such as the Port Erin and Dhoon anticlines and the Douglas Syncline. Several south-east directed thrust faults are mapped across the island. The Niarbyl Fault exposed in the cliff at Niarbyl on the west coast is considered to represent the Iapetus Suture, the welding together of the former continents of Laurentia and Avalonia in the course of the Caledonian Orogeny; sediments forming the rocks on one side of the fault were deposited on one continent, those on the other side were deposited on the other.

== Mineralisation ==
Lead, copper, zinc, silver, nickel and iron mineralisation has taken place in certain areas, notably around Foxdale, up Glen Mooar at Laxey and in the south of the island. Vein deposits are especially associated with steep faults in Manx Group rocks with galena and sphalerite being the main ore minerals. Copper ore is present as chalcopyrite and tetrahedrite. The lead-zinc mineralisation is thought to have occurred during the Carboniferous or Permian like that in the Lake District and North Pennines. The Foxdale and Glen Rushen mines operated until 1911 and mining in the island ceased when the Laxey Mine closed in 1919. Silver was produced at both the Foxdale and Laxey mines.

== Quaternary ==
The island was surrounded by and indeed invaded by Irish Sea Ice during the last Ice Age (and presumably earlier glacial periods). The Devensian has left a legacy of glacial till (diamicton) which is widespread and of variable thickness, many ridges being free of it. Pleistocene sediments across the north of the island are estimated to be in excess of 250m thick. The till together with talus and head are collectively known to geologists as the Snaefell Formation. This forms a part of the Manx Glacigenic Subgroup. The Bride Hills around the northern village of Bride which reach to an elevation of 96m are considered to be a push-moraine. Of note too is the Lhen Trench which is interpreted as a glacial meltwater channel.

There are extensive areas covered by sands and gravels of glacial origin including sandur deposits and moraines not least in the flat north where they are known collectively as the Jurby, Orrisdale and Shellag formations. There are less extensive spreads of such materials between Peel and St John's and north of Castletown and extending west to Port Erin. Together these constitute the Irish Sea Coast Glacigenic Subgroup. At the Late Glacial Maximum, it is estimated that ice cover across the Irish Sea was up to 700m thick which would have entirely covered the island. However, during deglaciation, the Isle of Man became a palaeo-nunatak at an early stage.

Holocene deposits include peat, beach sands and gravels and aeolian sands together with alluvial deposits around rivers and streams, the latter most notably around Sulby River, the River Glass and the River Neb.

== Geoconservation ==
The Manx Geological Survey is a charity established in 2000 which maintains a website dedicated to the island's geological heritage. As of 2013 no RIGS had been established on the Isle of Man nor had any ASSIs been designated on the basis of their geological interest but several designated for their wildlife interest incorporate geologically interesting sites. The Isle of Man Government has identified 30 coastal 'sites of geological interest'.
