= List of aviation accidents and incidents in the Isle of Man =

This article lists some of the aviation accidents and incidents in the Isle of Man from the 1940s to the 2010s.

== 1940s ==
- 1 January 1940, a Royal Air Force, Handley Page Hampden Mk I (registration: P1260) crashed into Snaefell in bad weather during a training flight. Killing three of the four crew.
- 1 October 1940, Royal Air Force, Fairey Firefly (registration: L5671) crashed during a training flight, West of the Greenhills Estate near Hall Caine Airport, Andreas, killing the two crew.
- 7 December 1940, Royal Air Force, Westland Wallace (registration: K6073) was forced to ditched into the Irish Sea off Langness Peninsula following engine failure. Killing one of the two on board.
- 2 May 1941, Royal Air Force, Blackburn Botha (registration: L6326) was forced to ditched into the Irish Sea following engine failure during training. The aircraft came down NorthEast of Carrick Rock near Port St Mary. All four crew on board died.
- 9 September 1941, Royal Air Force, Lockheed Hudson (registration: N7337) crashed into the side of North Barrule in bad weather, killing all four crew on board.
- 5 December 1941, Royal Air Force, Supermarine Spitfire (registration: P7502) went into a nose dive and crashed into Vonby Farm near Ramsey, killing the pilot.
- 9 February 1942, Royal Air Force, Supermarine Spitfire (registration: P8576) crashed into the Irish Sea North of the Isle of Man, killing the pilot.
- 12 March 1942, Royal Air Force, Blackburn Botha (registration: L6314) crashed into sea cliffs in Port Erin while in bad weather, killing all four crew.
- 15 June 1942, Two Royal Air Force, Bristol Blenheim (registration: K7084 & Z6191) collided in mid air & crash near Jurby, killing five crews.
- 4 August 1942, Royal Air Force, Blackburn Botha (registration: L6314) crashed landed near RAF Andreas 2 miles North of Ramsey after one of the engines failed, killing the two crew.
- 21 September 1942, Royal Air Force, Lockheed Hudson (registration: AM608) crashed into Slieau Freoaghane killing all six crew.
- 30 December 1943, Royal Air Force, Avro Anson (registration: N5026) crashed into a hillside 1.5 miles North of Port Soderick due to engine failure, killing all five crew.
- 13 June 1944, Royal Air Force, Avro Anson (registration: EG233) crashed into the side of North Barrule during a night navigational exercise, killing all five crew.
- 4 July 1944, United States Army Air Forces, Martin B-26 Marauder (registration: 41-35791) crashed into Cronk ny Arrey Laa, killing eight of the ten on board.
- 13 November 1944, Royal Air Force, Avro Anson (registration: AX177) crashed into Cronk ny Arrey Laa, killing all five crew.
- 14 April 1945,United States Army Air Forces, Boeing B-17 Flying Fortress (registration: 42-37840) crashed into a hillside near Port St Mary in bad weather while en-route from RAF Thurleigh to RAF Langford Lodge, killing all 11 crew.
- 23 April 1945, United States Army Air Forces, Boeing B-17 Flying Fortress (registration: 43-38856) crashed into North Barrule, killing all 31 passengers & crew. The accident is the deadliest aviation accident to have occurred in the Isle of Man.
- 3 January 1946 Royal Air Force, Avro Anson (registration: MG445) crashed into a hillside near Laxey, killing all four crew.
- 2 July 1946, Royal Air Force, Avro Anson (registration: MG437) was searching for a Wellington bomber (LP764) which went missing in the Irish Sea the day before. The Anson hit a fishing boat mast and crashed into the Irish Sea 8 miles Southwest of Calf of Man, killing all five crew.
- 10 June 1948, Hargreaves Airways De Havilland Dragon Rapide (registration: G-AIUI) crashed into Cronk ny Arrey Laa. Six of the nine people on board were killed. The aircraft was operating a scheduled passenger flight from Speke to Ronaldsway.
- 28 September 1948, World Air Freight Ltd, Handley Page Halifax (registration: G-AJNZ) was operating a cargo flight from Belfast Nutts Corner to Liverpool. The aircraft crashed into Cronk ny Arrey Laa, killing all four crew.

== 1950s ==
- 10 July 1951, Air Navigation and Trading Company de Havilland Dragon Rapide G-ALXJ crashed into the sea off Laxey, Isle of Man, killing the pilot. The aircraft was operating a scheduled cargo flight from Squires Gate Airport, Blackpool, Lancashire to RAF Jurby instead of its normal destination of Ronaldsway Airport, which was fogbound.
- 6 September 1953, Royal Air Force, Avro Anson (registration: VM418) crashed into the Clagh Ouyr near Laxey in bad weather, killing all four crew.
- 22 February 1954, Royal Air Force, Airspeed Oxford (registration: NM576) was on a flight from Belfast Nutts Corner to RAF Lichfield. While en-route one of the aircraft's engines failed and the pilots requested to divert to Ronaldsway Airport. Shortly after the aircraft crashed into the Irish Sea Northeast of Maughold, killing all four crew. A search for the aircraft failed to find the wreckage.

== 1960s ==
- 20 February 1961, Royal Air Force, Avro Anson (registration: VL312) crashed into a hillside near North Barrule, killing all six crew.
- 15 September 1969, Bensen B-8 (registration: G-AWBO) crashed 1/2 mile East of Mount Karrin near Ballaugh, killing the pilot.

== 1970s ==
- 20 January 1972, Royal Air Force, Blackburn Buccaneer (registration: XW539) crashed into Irish Sea off the coast of the Isle of Man, killing the two crew.

== 1980s ==
- 24 June 1983, Royal Air Force, British Aerospace Hawk T. Mk.1 (registration: XX166) was on a low flying training flight from RAF Valley to RAF Lossiemouth. The aircraft crashed into Clagh Ouyr, killing the two crew.
