= Hills and mountains of the Isle of Man =

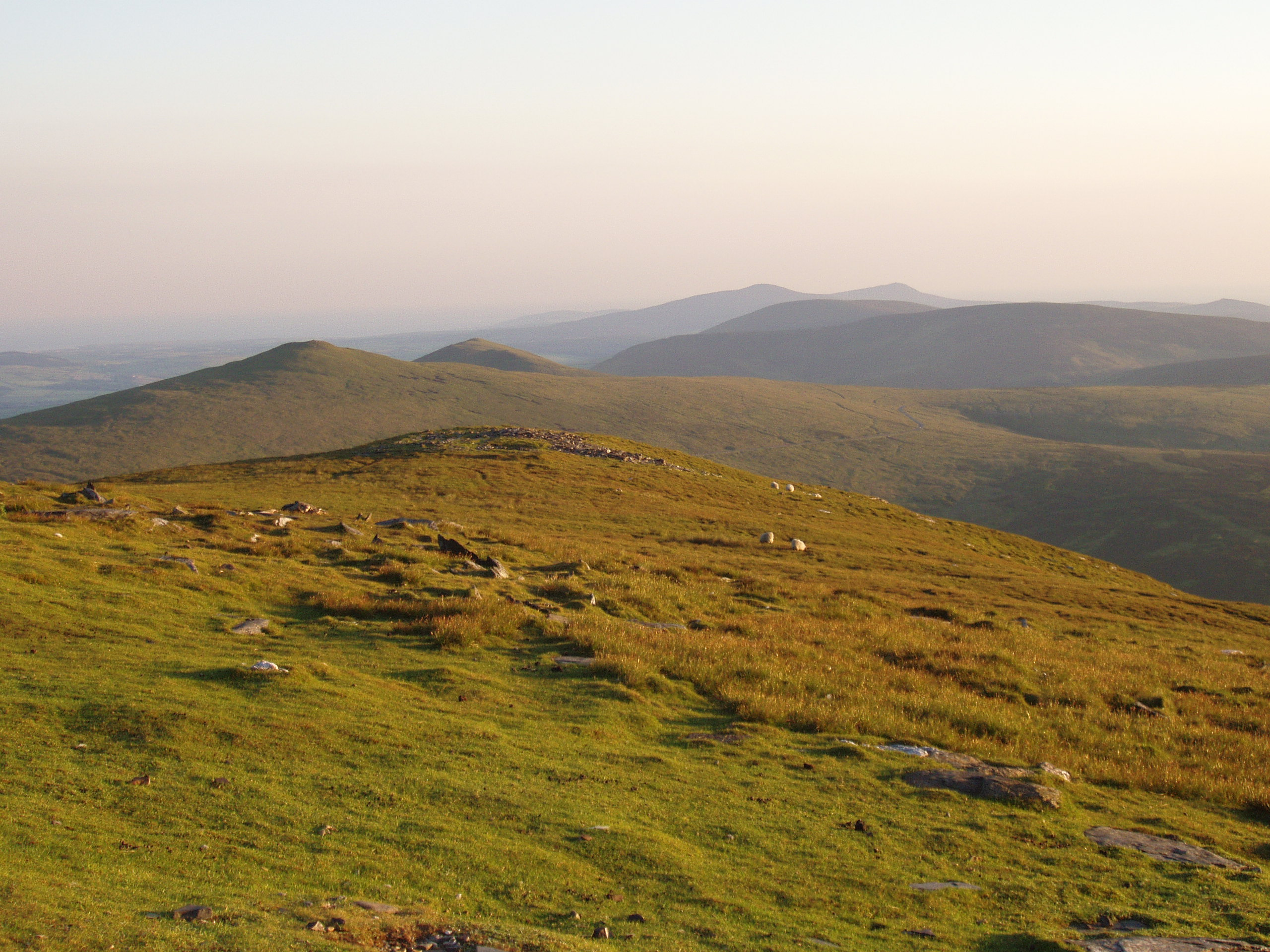
Some of the Isle of Man's mountainous terrain as viewed from the top of Snaefell.

The Isle of Man is mostly hilly, but has only one summit, Snaefell, classified as a mountain (over 2,000 feet).

== Overview ==
The south of the island has a small coastal plain around Castletown and Ballasalla but is otherwise hilly. In the south west these hills rise to more prominent peaks, notably South Barrule (483 m), and Cronk ny Arrey Laa (437 m) which drops almost vertically into the sea.

A central valley separates the southern hills from the central range which contains the highest peaks. This central range contains 11 out of 12 of the Island's highest peaks. It has open moorland and rough terrain. It is very sparsely populated and has just one major road crossing it except along the coast.

This then drops quite suddenly to a large flat northern glacial till plain which has only small rolling hills (max. 96 m) known as the Bride hills.

== Marilyns ==
The Isle of Man contains five Marilyns:

Peak	Height (m)	Prom. (m)	Key col (m)	Grid ref.	Parent
Snaefell	621	621	Sea	SC397881	None, highest peak in the Isle of Man
South Barrule	483	436	47	SC257759	Snaefell
Bradda Hill	230	193	37	SC193711	South Barrule
Slieau Freoaghane	488	153	335	SC340883	Snaefell
Mull Hill	169	151	18	SC189676	Bradda Hill

== List of peaks over 1,500 feet (457 m) ==
The Isle of Man contains 11 peaks which stand at over 1,500 ft. All of these, except for the South Barrule (in the south) are found in the central range which spans the region between the central valley and the flat fertile northern plain. Although none of these peaks are especially high, they appear quite prominent and impressive due to their proximity to the sea. Whilst many of these peaks are rugged, they are not steep enough to provide many opportunities for technical climbing (which can be found in abundance around the coast). There are opportunities for scrambling in some areas, including the northern slopes of the North Barrule, around the Sloc, and the southern slopes of Greeba Mountain. These can provide a training ground for the higher steeper mountains in places such as Snowdonia and the Highlands of Scotland; they are also far less crowded than some of Britain's more popular hill destinations. All of these peaks can be reached by a rough hill walk.

Hill	Height		Grid ref.	Area
Hill	(ft)	(m)	Grid ref.	Area
Snaefell	2,037	621	397881	Central
North Barrule	1,854	565	443909	North East
Clagh Ouyr	1,808	551	415890	North East
Beinn-y-Phott	1,785	544	381861	Central
Slieau Freoaghane	1,601	488	341883	Michael Hills
Colden	1,598	487	343843	Central
South Barrule	1,585	483	258759	South West
Slieau Ruy	1,572	479	329824	Central
Sartfell	1,490	454	335872	Michael Hills
Carraghyn	1,640	500	370850	Central
Slieau Lhean	1,539	469	426877	East

Additional heights above 1500 feet include Mullagh Ouyr (gr 398861) and two unnamed points on the ridge between Clagh Ouyr and the North Barrule (gr 425900 & 432904).

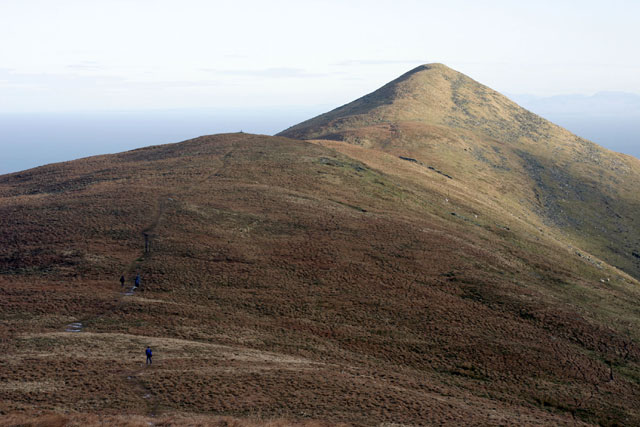
North Barrule

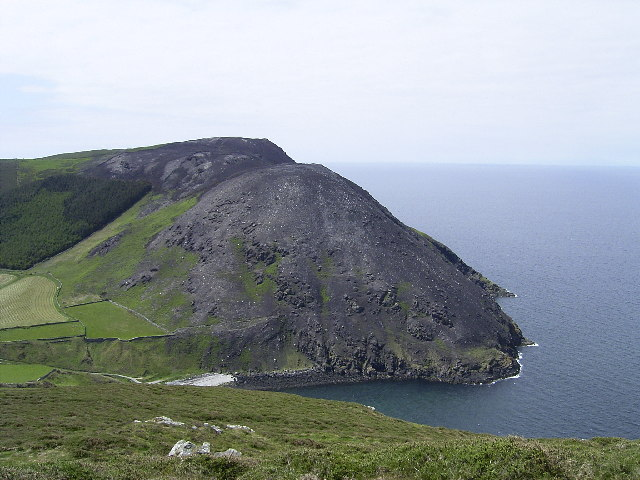
Bradda hill in the south

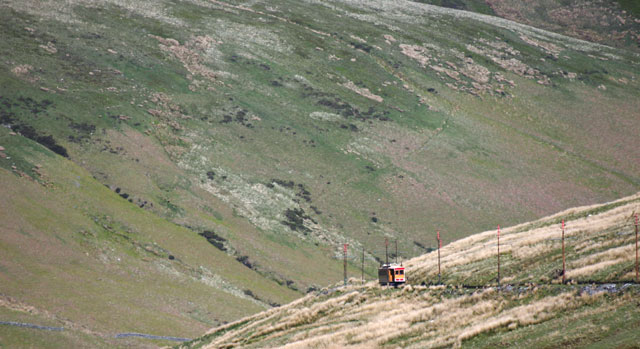
The railway to the summit of Snaefell
