= Snaefell Summit railway station =

Railway station in Isle of Man, the UK

Snaefell Summit Mullagh y Sniaull
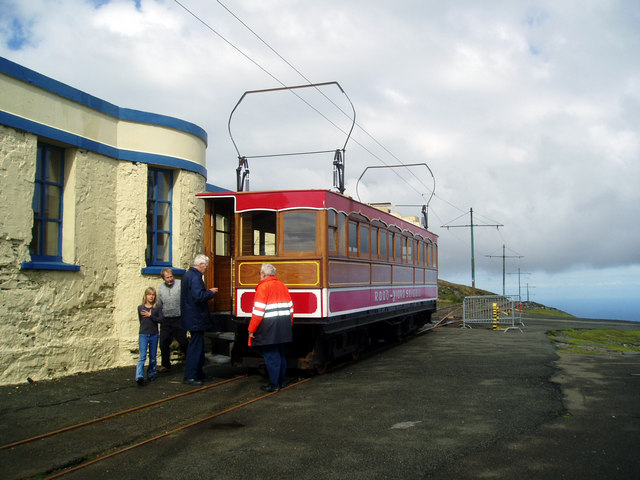

General information
- Location: Garff, Isle of Man
- Coordinates: 54°15′44″N 4°27′47″W
- System: Snaefell Mountain Railway
- Owner: Isle of Man Heritage Railways
- Line: Snaefell Mountain Railway
- Platforms: Ground level
- Tracks: Two running lines & point

Construction
- Structure type: Hotel building
- Parking: None

History
- Opened: 1895
- Former names: Manx Electric Railway Co., Ltd.

Services
Preceding station	Isle of Man rail network	Following station
Bungalow	Snaefell Mountain Railway (Laxey - Summit)	Terminus
Location

Snaefell Summit railway station (Manx: Stashoon Raad Yiarn Vullagh y Sniaull) is the upper terminus of the Snaefell Mountain Railway on the Isle of Man and is served by the tramway of the same name.

== History of the building ==
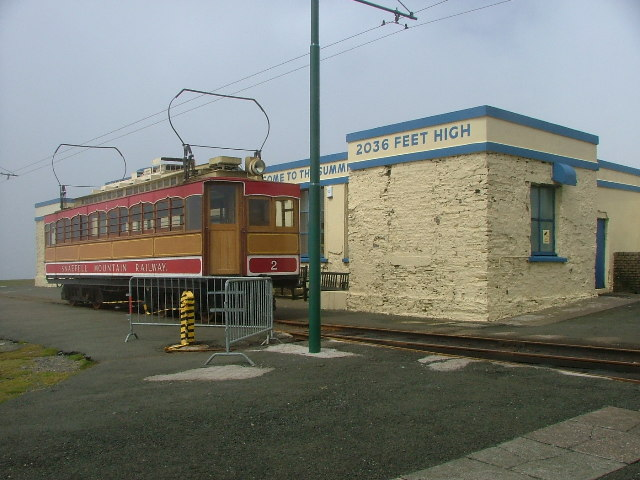
Prior to refurbishment

The line originally opened in 1895, when a wooden "chalet" type building was erected, including a waiting shelter and staff areas. As a result of increased popularity with the Victorian holidaymakers, a larger, brick-built structure was erected at the turn of the century. The original structure was built entirely of wood, and offered only basic facilities to visitors, and such was the popularity of the tramway that it outlived its usefulness within a few years. A replacement stone structure was installed in 1902 and featured castellated turrets and was more Gothic in appearance. It is the replacement building that serves the railway today but it is in much-simplified format, on the same site as the original building. Early views of the railway station and its environs reveal that there were timber boarded walkways leading to various viewpoints around the terminus. The walkways are now built of concrete, with metal handrails. Coin-operated telescopes were also a feature in the heyday of the line and these were reinstated in 2010.

In 1982 a fire gutted the building: it was allowed to burn out owing to the remote location and inaccessibility for the fire brigade. The building was then closed for two years. Owing to the lack of piped water at the summit, each operating day a tram delivers a bowser of drinking water for use in the restaurant. There was also a bar (explaining the one-time title of "Summit Hotel" featured in marketing). The station features a number of small historical displays around its walls which chart the history and construction of the line; and at one time there was also a display of various sideshows, such as a What the Butler Saw machine; these have been removed in recent times and an extensive refurbishment carried out over the winter of 2010–11 in readiness for a "Victorian Extravaganza" event in July.

== Centenary ==
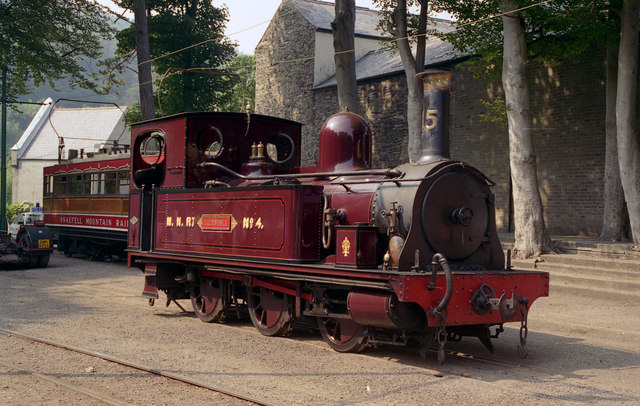
Caledonia, Laxey Station 1995

To mark the line's centenary in 1995, some remedial work was carried out to the exterior of the building and historical displays were added to the waiting area, many of which remain in place today. Generally speaking, however, the railway station building was in need of much improvement. This began to be addressed when central government funding became available, with the first phase of works commencing in January 2011.

The site is also home to a Civil Aviation Authority transmitter mast and station, There are transmitter masts and associated buildings on the summit itself which are viewable from many miles around; they provide transmission for a number of island facilities including telephones, mobile internet and television. In the winter months a small diesel railcar (stored in Laxey when not in use) is used to access the summit; as the overhead power lines for the electric cars are removed at the close of each season to protect them from damage by the cold weather.

The most notable event of recent years at the summit was the presence of all six mountain trams at one time for the line's centenary; this is believed to have been the first time this had ever happened. Also, the Manx Northern Railway locomotive Caledonia revisited the summit in 1995 to recreate the events of a century earlier when she had been loaned for use in the construction of the line; this event was a highlight of a year-long festival of events which saw additional services on all of the island's railways. The locomotive reached the summit several times, carrying passengers in a Manx Electric Railway winter saloon trailer. There being a difference of six inches in gauge between the two lines, a third rail was temporarily laid to accommodate these services.

== Facilities ==
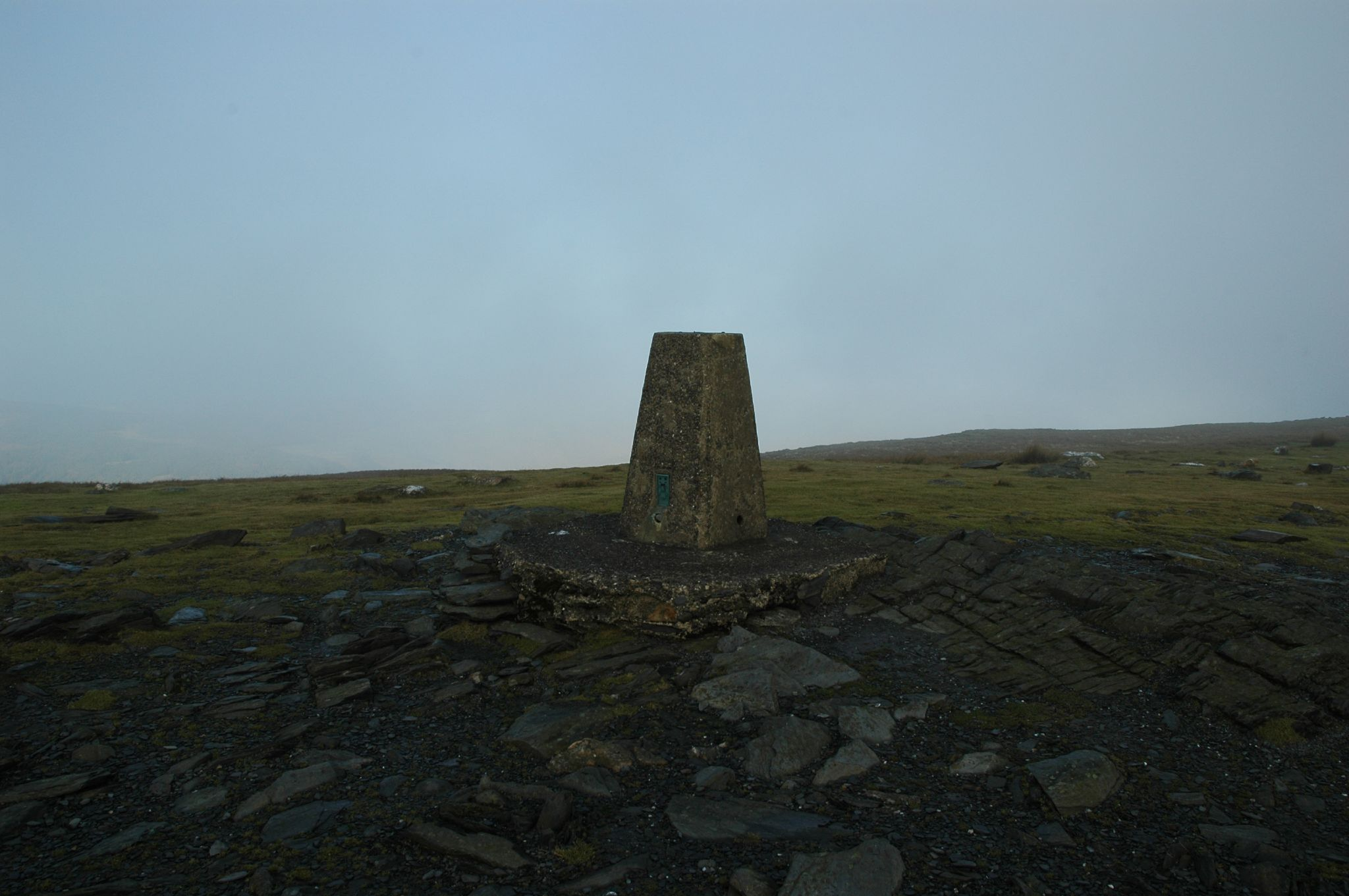
Summit marker

The building houses the café, bar, toilets and station master facilities; it remains intact today in a much fragmented form, having once been castellated but following a fire in 1982 these features were never replaced. It replaced an original wooden structure at the turn of the 20th century. The railway's operation being seasonal, the café and bar only open in conjunction with the railway.

== Marketing ==
It is said that from the summit of Snaefell you can see "seven kingdoms at a glance" and this legend was emblazoned on the railway's advertising for many years. Those kingdoms are: England, Scotland, Wales, Ireland, Mann (i.e. the Isle of Man), and the kingdoms of Heaven and the sea; sometimes the advertisements have read five or six kingdoms, but more usually the total of seven is cited.

=== "Sunset Dinners" ===
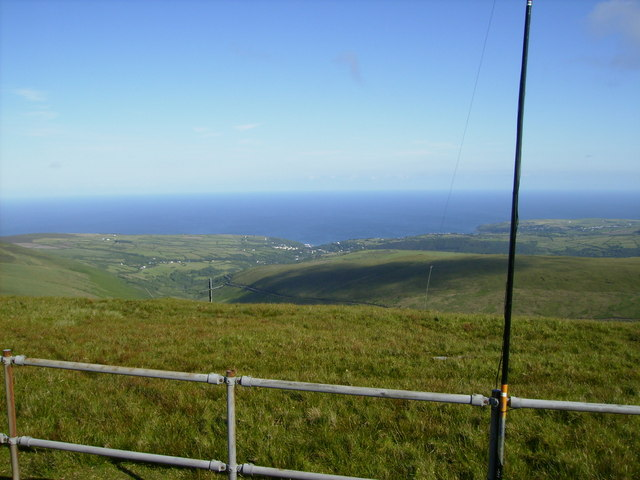
View towards Laxey Valley

There was an experimental service in summer 2009 by which visitors could to travel to the summit railway station after the day's routine timetabled services had ceased and enjoy an evening meal in the cafe; this was the first time in the line's history that regular scheduled evening services had been offered. This proved very popular with the public and was repeated over a number of weeks in summer 2010 and demand was such that additional dates were provided supplementing the advertised ones, although some of these additional services offered a buffet service as opposed to a full meal. Over the following winter much refurbishment work was carried out on the building and in 2011 the Sunset Dinner dates were further expanded, to operate once a week at the peak of the summer season. A choice of menus was offered as well as a wine list. The service was expanded in 2011 owing to continued popularity so that these meals are now available on Friday evenings from June to September in addition to the original Wednesdays.

=== "Seven Kingdoms Lunches" ===
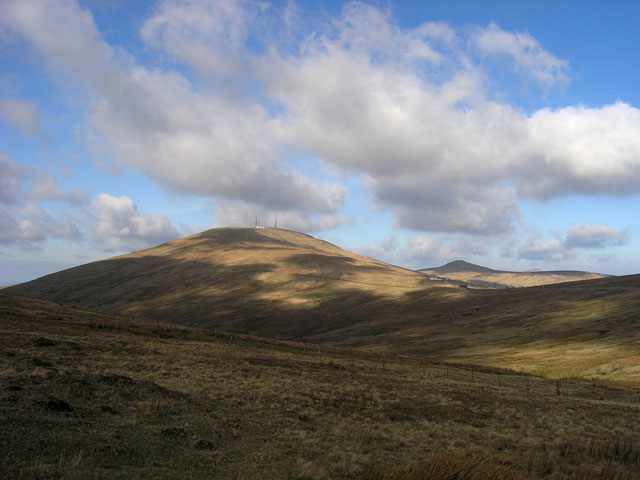
Snaefell summit

A one-off Easter Lunch was also offered in 2011 to mark the reopening of the facility after refurbishment. In summer 2011 "Seven Kingdoms Lunches" every Sunday afternoon were introduced. These are similar to the Sunset Dinners; owing to the unpredictable weather on the mountain, these do not have to be booked in advance, although capacity is limited.

=== "Pie in the Sky" ===
In 2010 the "Pie in the Sky" excursion tram was introduced: a return evening trip from Laxey to the summit where an astronomical talk and stargazing took place prior to refreshments before the return trip. These trips take place at key times of the year to maximize the stargazing opportunities with two sessions: the first trips are at the end of May when there are opportunities to view the rings of Saturn; further trips are at the end of September and start of October for views of the Milky Way and Andromeda. In the event of poor weather and/or visibility an illustrated lecture is also available.

== See also ==
- Snaefell Mountain Railway
- Manx Electric Railway
- Laxey Station

== Sources ==
- Goodwyn, A.M. (1976) Is This Any Way To Run A Railway ? - The story of the Manx Electric Railway since 1956., Manx Electric Railway Society website, accessed 24 November 2006
- Goodwyn, M., (1993) Manx Electric, Platform 5 Publishing, ISBN 1-872524-52-4
- Hendry, R., (1993), Rails in the Isle of Man: A colour celebration, Midland Publishing Limited, ISBN 1-85780-009-5
