= Barrule =

Barrule may refer to:

- MV Barrule, an Empire F type coaster in service with Southern Shipping Ltd, 1950-54
- North Barrule, a hill on the Isle of Man, lying mainly in the parish of Maughold
- South Barrule, a hill on the Isle of Man
- Barrule (band), band from the Isle of Man
