= USAAF Boeing B-17 crash on North Barrule =

Aviation accident

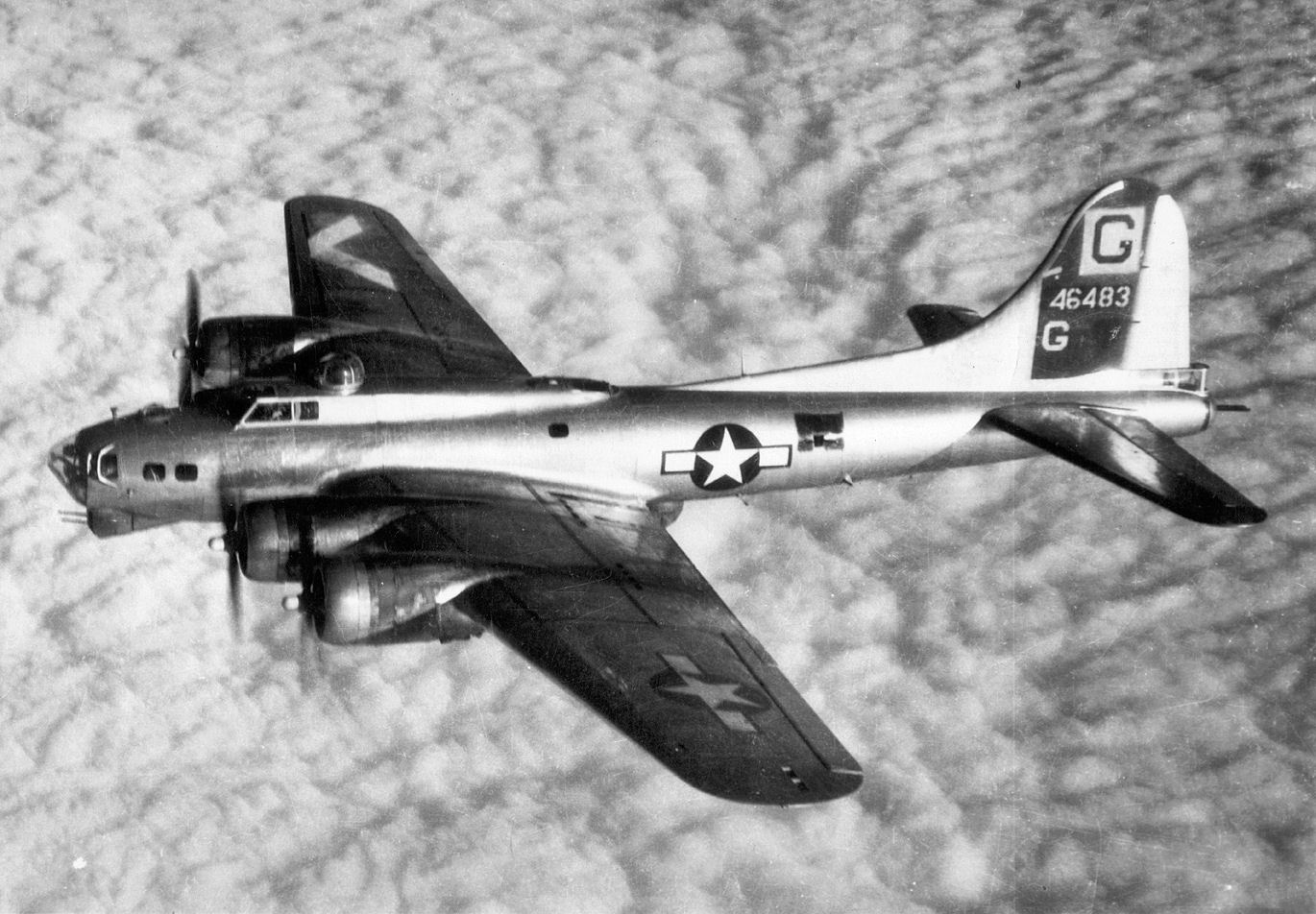
- A Boeing B-17G Flying Fortress, similar to the accident aircraft

Accident
- Date: 23 April 1945
- Summary: Controlled flight into terrain
- Site: North Barrule, Isle of Man (SC 442 907); 54°17′19″N 4°23′39″W

Aircraft
- Aircraft type: Boeing B-17G Flying Fortress
- Operator: 534th Bombardment Squadron, Eighth Air Force, United States Army Air Forces
- Registration: 43-38856
- Flight origin: RAF Ridgewell, Essex, United Kingdom
- Destination: RAF Nutts Corner, County Down, United Kingdom
- Passengers: 29
- Crew: 2
- Fatalities: 31
- Survivors: 0

On 23 April 1945, a Boeing B-17G Flying Fortress crashed on North Barrule, a hill in the Isle of Man. A total of 31 people were killed. The accident is the deadliest aviation accident to have occurred in the Isle of Man. It was due to controlled flight into terrain (CFIT).

== Aircraft ==
The accident aircraft was United States Army Air Forces (USAAF) serial number 43-38856, a Boeing B-17G Flying Fortress bomber of the 534th Bombardment Squadron, Eighth Air Force. The 534th was one of four squadrons that made up the 381st Bombardment Group (381st BG) based at RAF Ridgewell, Essex, United Kingdom.

== Accident ==
The aircraft was performing a passenger flight, taking 29 personnel on a week's leave to Northern Ireland. The passengers were all armorers, fitters, ground crew, and mechanics of various squadrons and support units of the 381st BG. Many of them had been at RAF Ridgewell since the 381st BG had arrived in June 1943. Two pilots brought the total on board to 31.

The aircraft took off from RAF Ridgewell for RAF Nutts Corner at 08:00, with an estimated time of arrival of 11:00. At 10:15, the B-17 was off the northeast coast of the Isle of Man, flying at an altitude of 500 feet (150 m). At 10:20, the aircraft flew into the east side of the 1,842 feet (561 m) high North Barrule and exploded in a fireball. The accident was heard by a tractor driver working at a nearby farm of Margher-e-Kew, Maughold. All 31 people on board were killed, making this the deadliest aviation accident in the Isle of Man.

Personnel from RAF Andreas recovered the bodies to that base for identification. On 24 April, a Boeing B-17E Flying Fortress from RAF Ridgewell arrived, bringing the base commander Colonel Conway S. Hall. He was told that arrangements for the repatriation of the bodies would take some days as diplomatic channels with the Manx Government had to be gone through. Hall decided this would take too long, and the deceased were flown back to RAF Ridgewell on 25 April. A minor diplomatic incident was caused, but nothing came of it. The victims of the accident were buried at Madingley Cemetery, Cambridgeshire, United Kingdom.

== Memorial ==
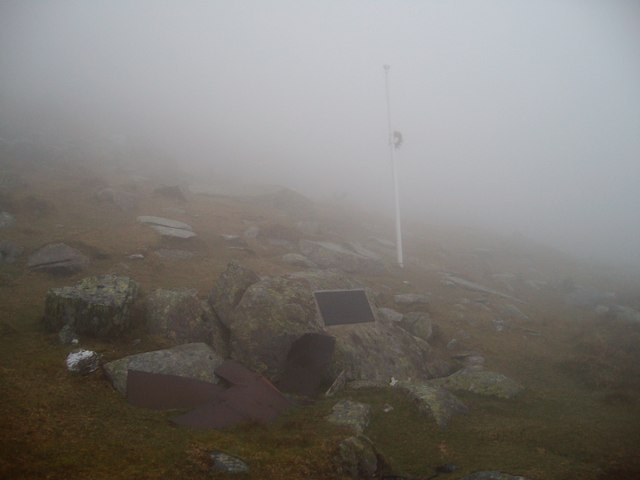
The memorial plaque at the crash site, seen in similar weather to that prevailing at the time of the accident

A memorial plaque was placed at the crash site in June 1995 by the Maughold Commissioners and the Manx Aviation Preservation Society. The American flag was flown at the memorial on the 69th anniversary of the accident.
