= Bungalow railway station =

Railway station on the Isle of Man

The Bungalow Yn Thie Injil
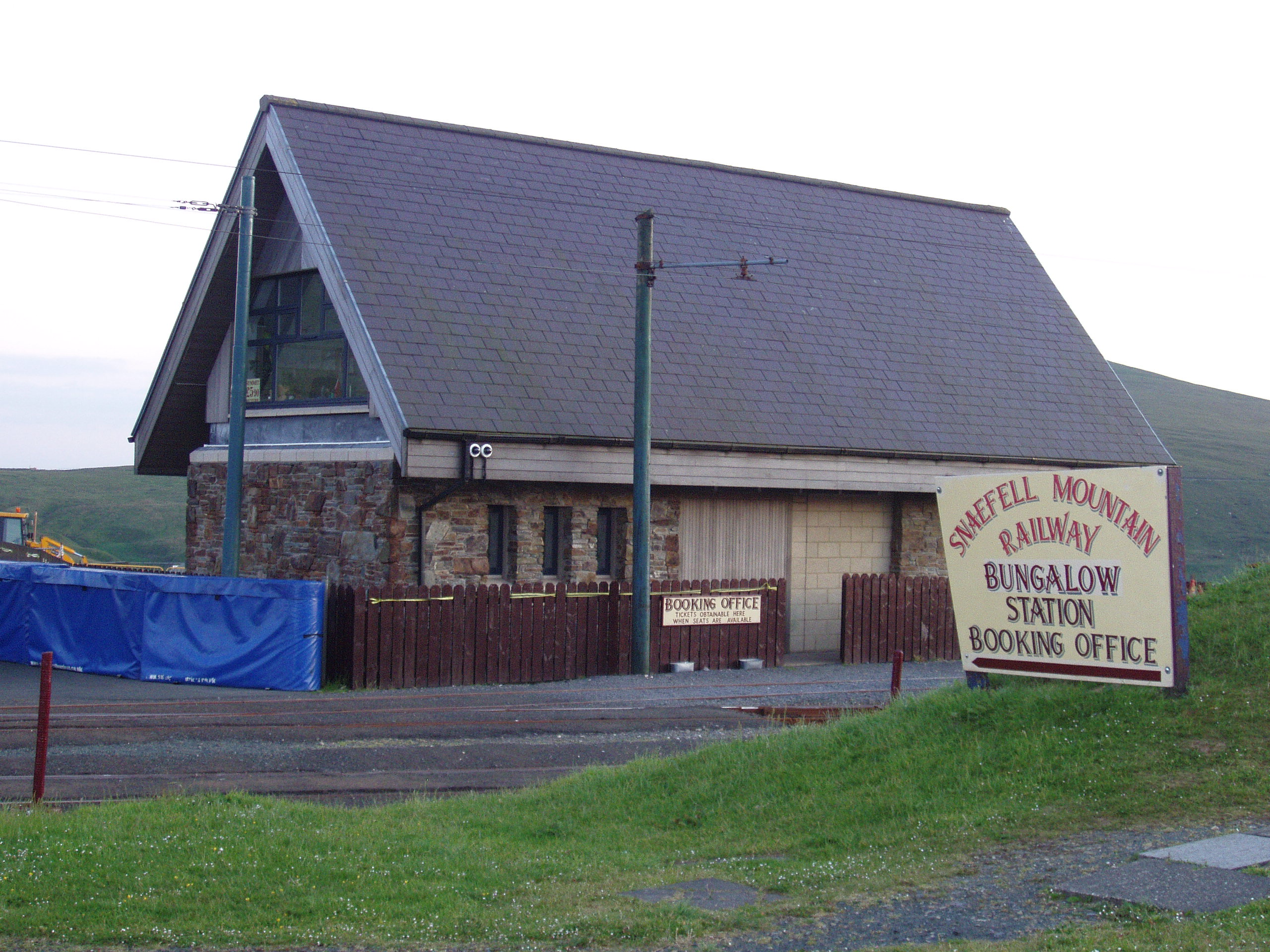

General information
- Location: Lezayre, Isle Of Man
- Coordinates: 54°15′05″N 4°27′49″W
- System: Snaefell Mountain Railway
- Owner: Isle of Man Heritage Railways
- Line: Snaefell Mountain Railway
- Platforms: Ground Level
- Tracks: Two Running Lines & Sidings

Construction
- Structure type: Brick Station
- Parking: Ample

History
- Opened: 1895
- Rebuilt: 2001
- Former names: Manx Electric Railway Co., Ltd.

Services
| Preceding station | Isle of Man rail network | Following station |
|---|---|---|
| Laxey | Snaefell Mountain Railway (Laxey - Summit) | Snaefell Summit |
Location

Bungalow Station (Manx: Stashoon Yn Thie Injil) (more commonly The Bungalow) is the only intermediate station on the Isle of Man's Snaefell Mountain Railway and is located where the main mountain road intersects the line. It is on the border of the parishes of Lezayre (Ayre) and Lonan (Garff).

== Origins ==
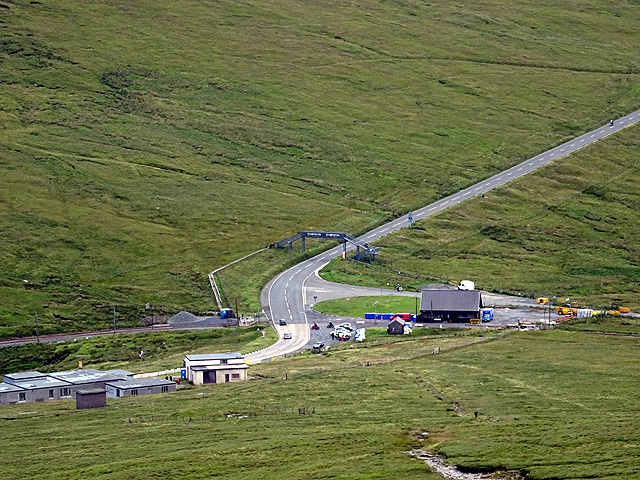
Bungalow station seen from Summit station

The area was so called because until 1958 there was a large hotel here of that name, and after its destruction it was replaced by a much more modest waiting shelter. It was not until 2002 that this was in turn knocked down and replaced with a "proper" station building with station master facilities, booking hall and toilets. Prior to this the staff used a marshall's hut mainly intended for the T.T. races on the island.

== Museum ==
The Bungalow, despite its remote location, was also the home to Murray's Motorcycle Museum until recent years; this was housed in an ex-Ministry of Defence building and held a large number of static displays. After the death of Joey Dunlop, a statue to his memory was erected in the grounds of the museum and it still remains there despite the closure of the museum.

== Centenary ==
As part of the International Railway Festival to celebrate the line's centenary in 1995 a third rail was laid from here to the Summit Station to facilitate the use of a steam locomotive on the line. The gauge of the mountain line is 3' 6" (to accommodate the "fell rail") whereas the other main lines on the island are 3' 0"; so when Manx Northern Railway locomotive No. 4 Caledonia arrived, the extra rail was laid. This event marked the centenary of the line, and because this locomotive had been loaned to the tramway during construction all those years ago. The remains of the interchange are still visible today.

== T.T. Races ==
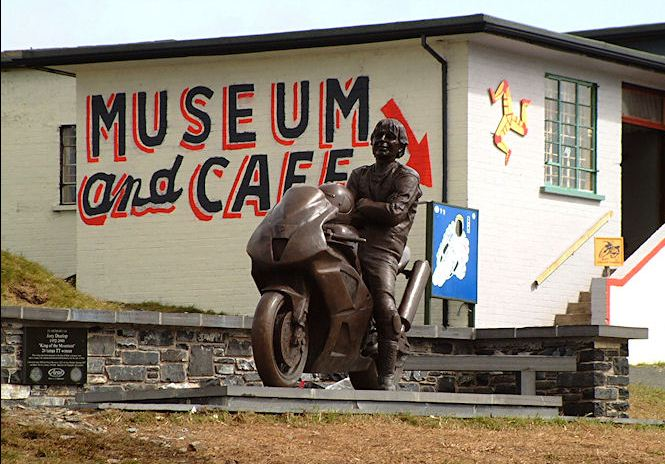
Joey Dunlop Statue

The station is a popular viewpoint from which to watch the T.T. motorbike races and the Manx Grand Prix races. As the tramway crosses the course, tramcars terminate on either side of the road during race periods, with cars being moved to the upper part of the line prior to road closure. To facilitate passenger access, there is a footbridge over the road, which was installed as a permanent feature in 1994. Previously there had been a temporary structure that was removed each winter. The railway is extremely busy on race days carrying bikers from Laxey station to this point, and onwards for refreshments at the summit. In recent times boarded walkways have been installed to deliver passengers from the tramcar to the foot of the bridge for ease of access. The bridge itself often carries large advertisement hoardings for local businesses and events.

== See also ==
Manx Electric Railway stations

== Sources ==
- Goodwyn, A.M. (1976) Is This Any Way To Run A Railway ? - The story of the Manx Electric Railway since 1956., Manx Electric Railway Society website, accessed 24 November 2006
- Goodwyn, M., (1993) Manx Electric, Platform 5 Publishing, ISBN 1-872524-52-4
- Hendry, R., (1993), Rails in the Isle of Man: A colour celebration, Midland Publishing Limited, ISBN 1-85780-009-5
