= Dalby Group =

Rock strata sequence

- Stratigraphic range: Wenlock epoch of Silurian
- Type: Group
- Sub-units: Niarbyl Formation
- Overlies: Manx Group (probably unconformably)
- Thickness: c.1200m

Lithology
- Primary: sandstone
- Other: siltstone, mudstone

Location
- Region: Isle of Man
- Country: United Kingdom (Crown dependency)
- Extent: Niarbyl to Peel

Type section
- Named for: Dalby

The Dalby Group is a Silurian lithostratigraphic group (a sequence of rock strata) on the west coast of the Isle of Man in the Irish Sea. The name is derived from the village of Dalby near the west coast of the island. Together with those of the adjoining Manx Group, the rocks of the Group have also previously been referred to as the Manx Slates or Manx Slate Series. The group comprises wacke sandstones with siltstones and mudstones which reach a thickness of about 1200m in the west of the island. It contains only the single Niarbyl Formation which is exposed along the coast between Niarbyl Point and the town of Peel to the north.
