= Snaefell Mountain Railway =

Mountain railway on the isle of Man

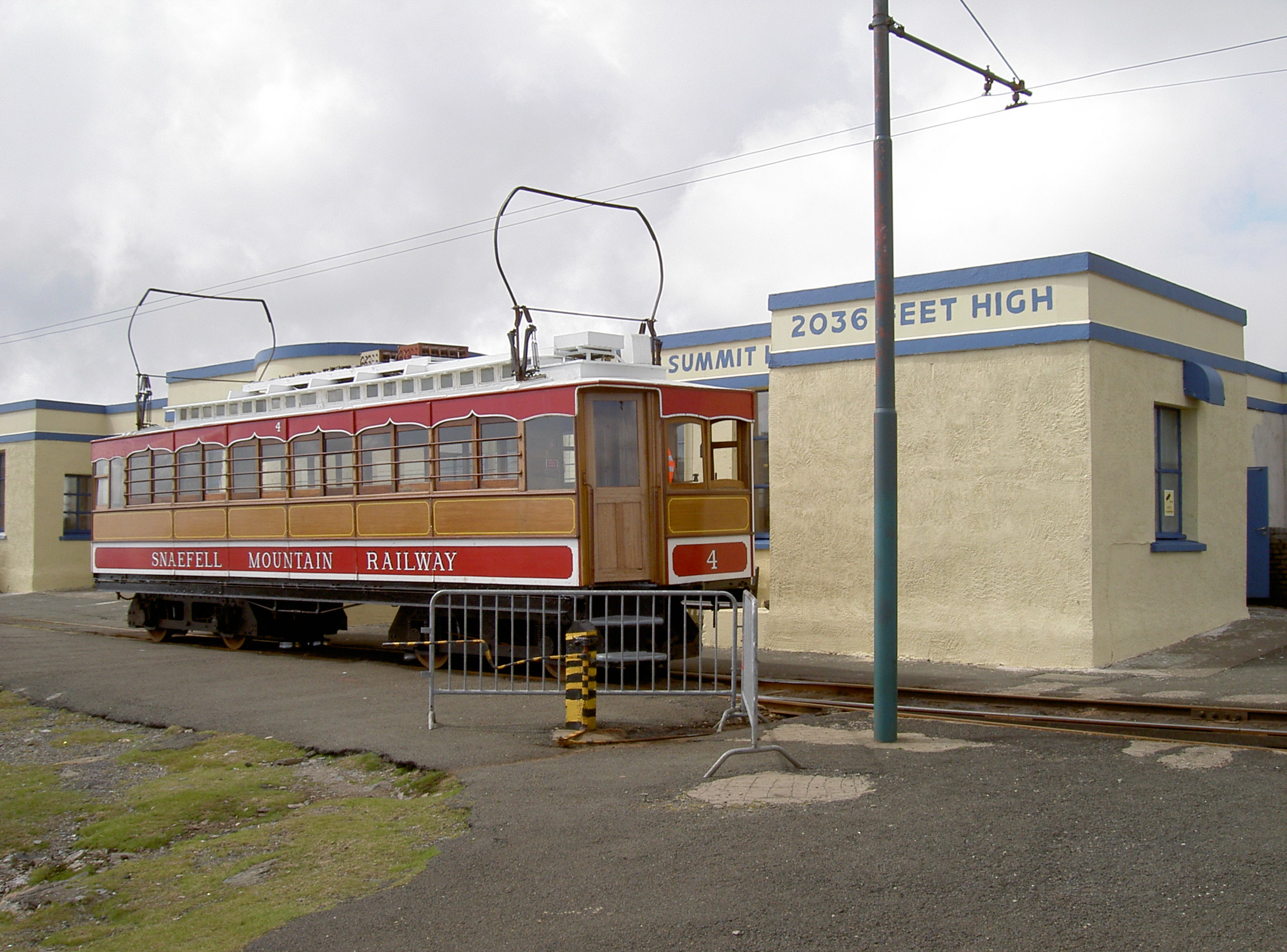
- Tram No. 4 at the summit

Overview
- Owner: Department of Infrastructure
- Termini: Laxey (Interchange) Station; Snaefell Summit Station
- Stations: 3

Service
- Operator: Isle of Man Heritage Railways
- Depot: Laxey (Snaefell) Depot

History
- Opened: 1895

Technical
- Line length: 5.5 miles (8.9 km)
- Track length: 11.7 miles (18.8 km)
- Number of tracks: Double Track (right-hand traffic)
- Rack system: Fell System
- Track gauge: 3 ft 6 in (1,067 mm)
- Electrification: 550 V DC Overhead Wire
- Highest elevation: 2,036 feet (621 m).
- Maximum incline: 1:12 (83.3 ‰)
Route map
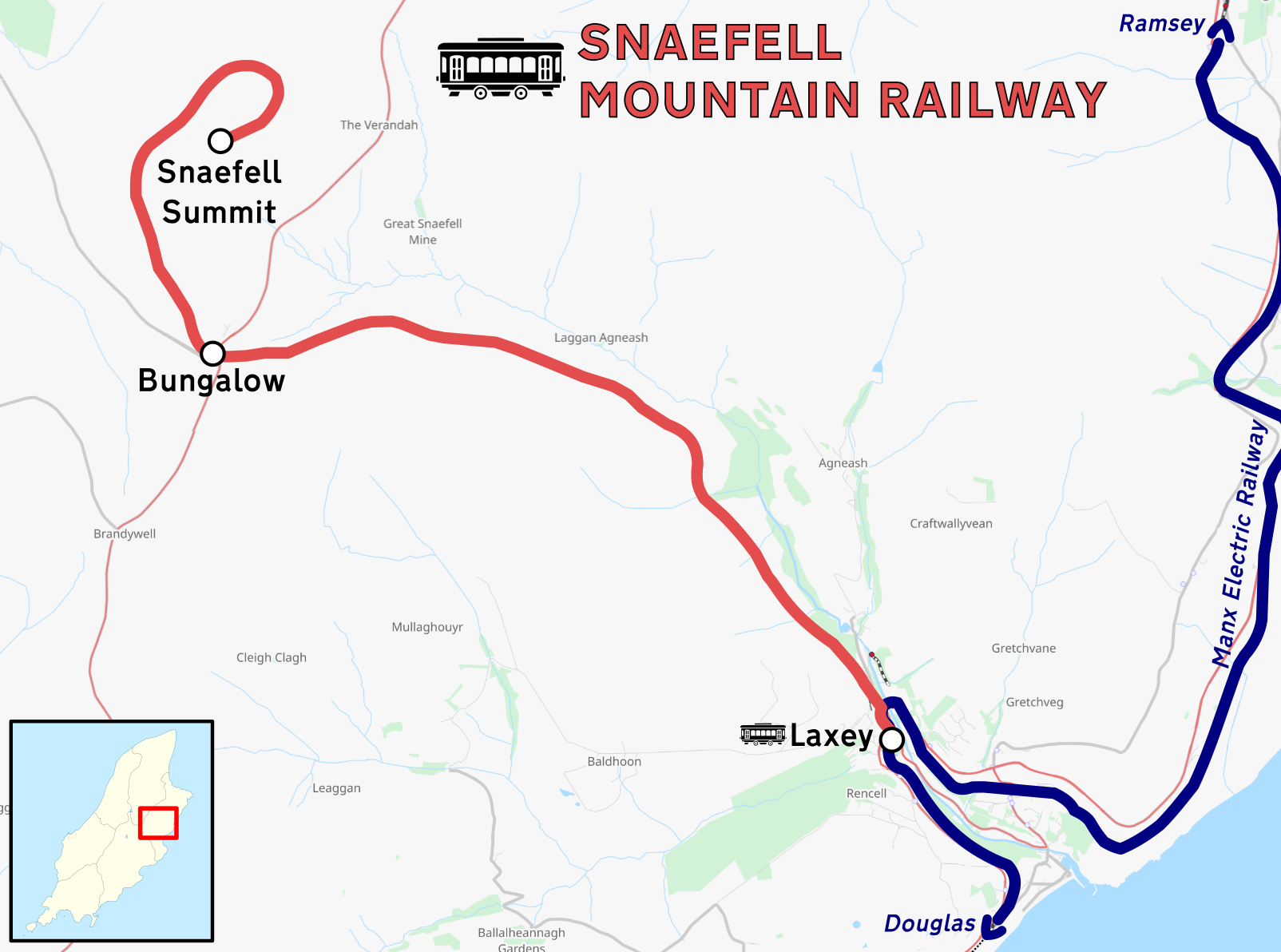
(Click to expand)

The Snaefell Mountain Railway is an electric mountain railway on the Isle of Man in Europe. It joins the village of Laxey with the summit of Snaefell, at 2,036 feet (621 m) above sea level the highest point on the island. It connects with the Manx Electric Railway (MER) in Laxey. The line is 5 miles (8 km) long, is built to 3 ft 6 in (1,067 mm) gauge and uses a Fell Incline Railway System centre rail for braking on the steep gradients. It is electrified using overhead wires at 550 volts direct current, with bow collectors. It is owned and operated by Isle of Man Heritage Railways, a department of the Isle of Man Government. The railway operates from March to early November, using five wooden-bodied electric railcars built in 1895.

== Operation ==
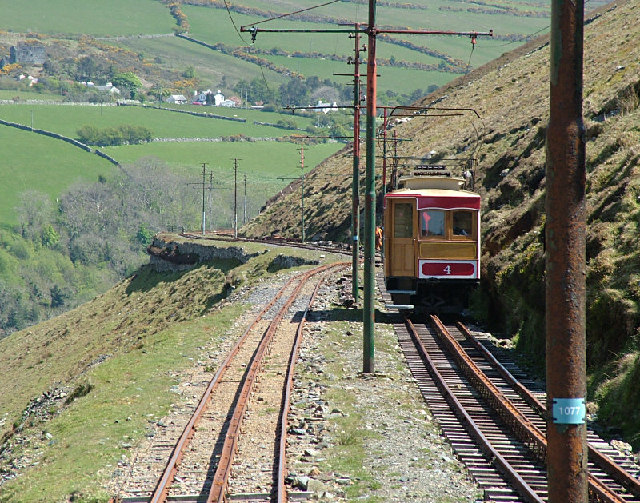
Car No.4 Note Central "Fell" Rail.

The railway operates from March to early November, taking 30 minutes for a one-way journey. In winter the overhead wires on the exposed upper part of the route are dismantled to avoid damage from icing. All passenger traffic is carried in five wooden-bodied electric railcars, built in 1895 and numbered 1, 2, 4, 5 and 6. Car 3 was destroyed in 2016. Car 5 was burned out in an accident in 1970 and its body is a replacement built in 1971 to a similar design. The cars were re-equipped in the late 1970s with new bogies to a design based on the original, using motors and traction equipment from withdrawn Aachen trams built by Waggonfabrik Talbot in 1956. Because of the different gauge and the centre rail, vehicles cannot inter-run between the railway and the 3 ft (914 mm) gauge MER. Railway vehicles are occasionally worked to the MER workshops at Douglas by swapping their bogies, and to aid this there is a dual gauge siding in Laxey. The railway is owned and operated by Isle of Man Heritage Railways, a department of the Isle of Man Government.

== History ==
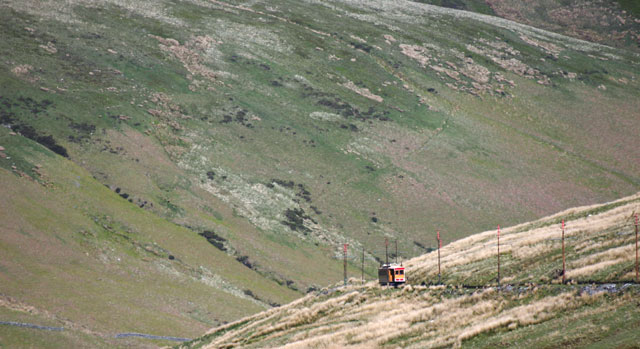
Mountain view (tram in distance)

The line was originally surveyed by George Noble Fell, the son of John Barraclough Fell who invented the Fell system. This survey was for a steam-operated railway using the Fell centre rail for both propulsion and braking, and the scheme was approved by Tynwald in 1888 but not built. In 1895 the Snaefell Mountain Railway Association (SMRA) revived the plans, and adopted the route of the earlier survey. As the line was built entirely on land leased by the association there was no need for statutory powers, and the line was constructed very quickly and opened on 20 August 1895. During construction the line was laid as a mixed gauge route of both 3' and 3'6"; the line was built using the six coupled Manx Northern Railway 4/IMR15 Caledonia; the 3' third rail was temporarily reinstated for the centenary to allow Caledonia, now fitted with a hydraulic Fell brake, to return to the mountain propelling an MER saloon coach. The line was built from scratch as an electric railway without Fell traction equipment, relying on normal rail adhesion for propulsion up the steep gradients; however the cars are fitted with Fell braking equipment for use when descending.

In December 1895, the SMRA sold the line to the Isle of Man Tramways & Electric Power Co. Ltd (IoMT&EP), which owned the MER. Doubt was thrown on this transaction retrospectively after the later collapse of the IoMT&EP, when it was revealed that the SMRA was unregistered, and that most of the directors of the IoMT&EP were also members of the SMRA and had voted on the acquisition in contravention of that company's articles of association. The IoMT&EP went into liquidation in 1900 as a consequence of a banking collapse. The railway and the MER were sold by the liquidator to the newly-formed Manx Electric Railway Co. Ltd, which took over in 1902. By the late 1950s the company was in financial difficulties as well, and it was acquired by the Isle of Man Government in 1957.

== Stations ==
Point	Coordinates (Links to map resources)	OS Grid Ref	Notes
Laxey	54.2319°N 4.4058°W	SC43288447	Interchange with Manx Electric Railway
The Bungalow	54.2513°N 4.4637°W	SC39588675	
Snaefell Summit	54.2622°N 4.463°W	SC39678797	

The main station on the line is the interchange with the Manx Electric Railway at Laxey; the only intermediate stopping place on the line is at the Bungalow, at the mid-way position where the line crosses the Mountain Road (A18), part of the Snaefell Mountain Course used in the TT races. During race periods, trams terminate on either side of the road and passengers cross over a footbridge.

Above Laxey station there is a spur leading to the depot where all the rolling stock is housed and maintained; this complex was completely rebuilt in the winter of 1994–95 and officially opened in readiness for the railway's centenary. Also in the depot is a smaller shed which houses the Air Ministry railcars used to access masts at the summit during the winter months, when the overhead lines are removed from the top section of the line to prevent frost damage.

== Rolling stock ==
=== Passenger ===
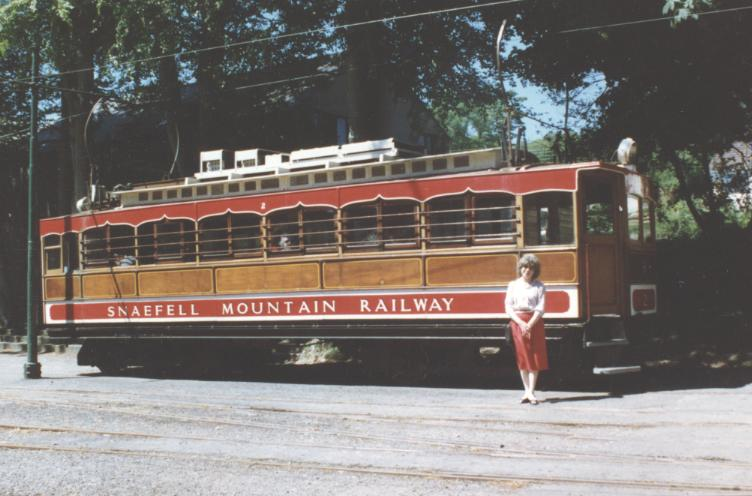
Car No. 2 at Laxey Station

The railway operates with five of the original six identical tramcars, all built in 1895 by George F. Milnes & Co., and delivered in time for the line's opening that year. Of note is Car No. 5 which was severely damaged by a fire on 16 August 1970 and subsequently rebuilt locally, re-entering service in 1971. It was distinguished by having modern aluminium-framed "bus" type windows, but these were removed and wooden sliding ones refitted during a subsequent rebuild in 2003, when the tram became the first to carry the railway's name in Manx along its side.

The current livery has been standard for over a century, save for a period upon nationalisation in 1957 when certain cars carried an unpopular green and white scheme. The original livery used until 1899 was a cream and Prussian blue scheme featuring "tramway" wording (rather than "railway" which has since been favoured). With the extensive rebuild of Car No. 1 commencing in 2011, this car was chosen to revert to the original colour scheme, complete with original wording. This was the first time a markedly different livery has been carried by any of the cars since the abolition of the short-lived nationalisation (green and white) colour scheme in 1962.

Until the addition of dynamic braking equipment on car roofs in 1970, knifeboard adverts were carried on the roof tops. Car No. 3 was totally destroyed in an incident on 30 March 2016, when it ran away from Summit station and derailed. The salvageable remains of the vehicle have been stored at the engineering works of the Manx Electric Railway, where it is expected that the car will eventually be rebuilt.

Key:	In Service	Undergoing Rebuild	Destroyed

No.	Year	Type	Livery	Status
1	1895	Vestibuled Saloon	Blue, White & Teak	In Service
2	1895	Vestibuled Saloon	Red, White & Teak	In Service
3	1895	Vestibuled Saloon	~	Destroyed
4	1895	Vestibuled Saloon	Green, White & Teak	In Service
5	1895	Vestibuled Saloon	Red, White & Teak	In Service
6	1895	Vestibuled Saloon	~	Withdrawn for overhaul in 2017

=== Non-passenger car ===
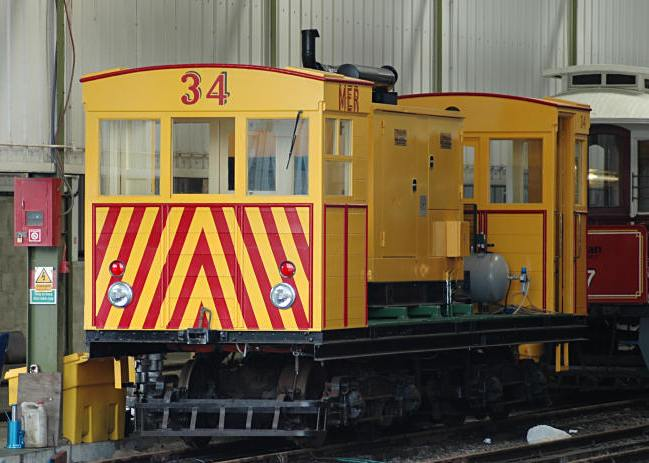
Car No. 7 "Maria", as rebuilt

The seventh car built by the railway was a non-passenger car supplied at opening in 1895. It was based largely upon the passenger cars, but without seated closed accommodation. Numbered 7 in sequence with the other stock and nicknamed "Maria", it was used to convey coal from Laxey to the power station near the Bungalow, and traditionally borrowed traction bogies from other passenger vehicles as required. It latterly saw many years at the works depôt mounted on barrels until it became completely rotten and beyond saving. A replica was built in 1994 to take part in the International Railway Festival celebrating the line's centenary. This saw limited use on the line; later it was converted for use on the Manx Electric Railway and re-gauged to 3 ft (36 in). It was re-numbered as Car No. 34 on the "low road" (a colloquial name for the MER to differentiate it from the mountain line) before reverting to No.7 in 2025. It features a mounted diesel generator for self-propulsion when the overhead wires are down.

Key:	In Service	Scrapped

No.	Built	Builder	Layout	Livery	Status
7 (i)	1896	G.F. Milnes & Co., Ltd.	End Cabs & Open Wagon	Grey	Scrapped in 1995
7 (ii)	1994	Manx Electric Railway	End Cabs & Open Wagon	Grey	In regular (departmental) use

=== National Air Traffic Services ===
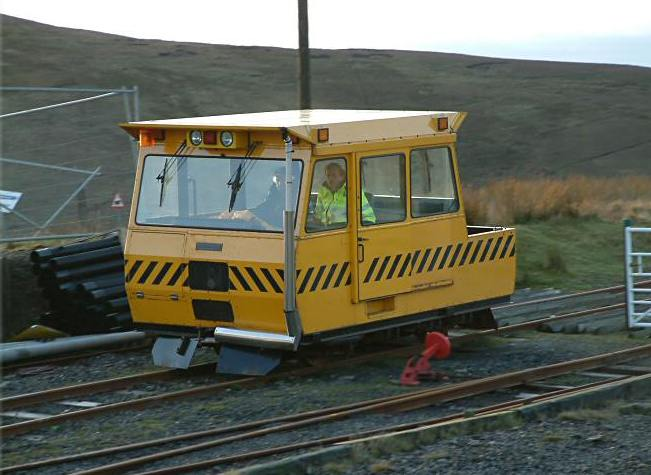
Civil Aviation Railcar No. 4

There have been four different railcars on the line, all Wickham trolleys, starting with Air Ministry No. 1 which arrived in Air Force Blue livery, but was repainted into yellow and black (Civil Aviation Authority colours) in the 1960s; it has since been sold to a private owner and shipped to the UK in June 2007 for restoration. The second car also arrived in Air Force Blue livery, and was likewise repainted into yellow and black in the 1960s. The third trolley (built 1977) remains in service. The newest, No. 4, is currently in use by National Air Traffic Services (the successor of the Air Ministry and Civil Aviation Authority). The vehicles are used by crews travelling to maintain the aerial masts at the top of Snaefell mountain.

Works No.	Fleet No.	Builders	Year Delivered	Original Livery	Status
5864	Air Ministry No.1	Wickham of Ware	1951	Teal Blue	Awaiting restoration at the Statfold Barn Railway
7642	C.A.A. No.2	Wickham of Ware	1957	Teal Blue	Unknown
10956	C.A.A. No.3	Wickham of Ware	1977	Teal Blue	Operational
11730	N.A.T.S. No.4	Wickham of Ware	1991	Yellow / Black	Undergoing overhaul

=== Other ===
The railway also has a four-wheeled wagon used to carry supplies to the summit railway station, which has no road access; the wagon is ordinarily propelled in front of the first morning car which delivers the staff to the summit, and remains at the summit during the operational day, returning behind the last tram. It is occasionally used on service cars as part of special events, primarily for photographic purposes.

== Incidents ==
During the construction of the line in 1895, the steam locomotive "Caledonia" was being used to transport sleepers and rails up the line. Heading up the hill from Dumbell's Row, the locomotive began to slip about 20 metres up the hill, crashing through a bakery and into a greengrocer's shop, causing significant damage to both properties. Neither property owners nor drivers were hurt.

On Monday, 27 July 2009, a vehicle carrying a mechanical excavator came into contact with wires supplying traction power to the Snaefell Mountain Railway and the Manx Electric Railway at a crossing in Laxey, according to portal site Manx.net. There were no injuries. Police and MER electrical engineering crews were at the scene of the incident, the report also said. It did not indicate what damage had occurred as a result of the incident. Service resumed the next day after temporary repairs to the overhead lines, which were permanently repaired over the next couple of weeks.

On 30 March 2016, the empty Car No. 3 suffered a runaway from the Summit and derailed just north of Bungalow station. No injuries were reported, but the 121-year old tramcar was totally destroyed in the incident. 30 passengers were left stranded at the Summit for a short time.

On 4 August 2017, Car No. 2 suffered brake failure on the descent from the Summit to the Bungalow. The Isle of Man's Director of Public Transport, Ian Longworth, stated that the tram had sustained a loss of rheostatic braking due to an interruption in the overhead electricity supply which occurred when the bow current collector momentarily lost contact with the overhead wire. In this incident the crew attempted to apply the emergency Fell-rail brake, but were initially hampered in their attempts by a gap in the Fell-rail at a road crossing near the Bungalow railway station. The crew were eventually able to stop the vehicle when the tram returned to the Fell-rail section. Following the incident, the speed limit on the line was reduced from 12 miles per hour (19 km/h) to 8 miles per hour (13 km/h). However, on 10 August, the Health and Safety at Work Inspectorate banned trams from operating following reports that trams were not adhering to the new speed limit. Services resumed on 30 March 2018 after modifications to the braking systems.

== See also ==
- Transport on the Isle of Man
- List of light-rail/tram systems
- British narrow gauge railways
