= Laxey railway station =

Railway station in Isle of Man, the UK

Laxey Laksaa
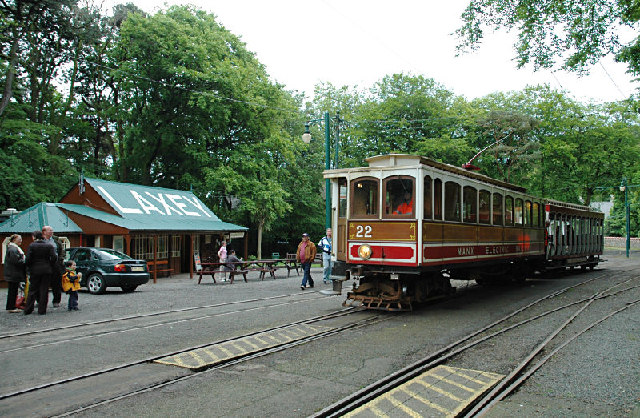

General information
- Location: Laxey, Isle of Man
- Coordinates: 54°13′55″N 4°24′21″W
- Owner: Isle of Man Railways
- Line: Manx Electric Railway; Snaefell Mountain Railway
- Platforms: Ground Level
- Tracks: 2 (Manx Electric railway); 2 (Mountain Railway)

Construction
- Structure type: Station / Waiting Room / Cafe
- Parking: On Site

History
- Opened: 1894; 132 years ago
- Former names: Manx Electric Railway Co.

Services
| Preceding station | Isle of Man rail network | Following station |
|---|---|---|
| Car Sheds | Manx Electric Railway (Douglas - Ramsey) | Dumbell's Row |
| Terminus | Snaefell Mountain Railway (Laxey - Summit) | Bungalow |
Location

Laxey Railway Station (Manx: Stashoon Raad Yiarn Laksaa) is an interchange station in the village of Laxey on the east coast of the Isle of Man. It is the principal intermediate station on the Manx Electric Railway (3' 0" (914 mm) gauge) as well as being the lower terminus of the Snaefell Mountain Railway (3' 6" (1067 mm) gauge, to accommodate a central braking rail). It is thus the island's only dual-gauge station, albeit with completely separate tracks. Some MER services from/to Douglas terminate here.

== Facilities ==
The tin-roofed station building dates from the early years of the line and features the station name in large lettering painted on its roof. This building houses a booking office and a café as well as the station toilets, and was extensively refurbished in 1994, marking the centenary of the tram service to the village, though not on this site.

== Re-siting ==
The first terminal was located on the site of today's sub-station, whilst the viaduct (at the southern end of the station) was constructed to bridge the gap over the Glen Roy below.

== See also ==
- Manx Electric Railway stations

== Sources ==
- Manx Electric Railway Stopping Places (2002) Manx Electric Railway Society
- Island Images: Manx Electric Railway Pages (2003) Jon Wornham
- Official Tourist Department Page (2009) Isle Of Man Heritage Railways
