= Manx Group =

- Stratigraphic range: Tremadocian to Arenig substages of Ordovician
- Type: Group
- Sub-units: Glen Dhoo, Lonan, Mull Hill, Creg Agneash, Maughold, Barrule, Injebreck, Glen Rushen, Creggan Mooar and Ladyport Formations
- Underlies: Dalby Group (probably unconformably)
- Thickness: at least 3,000 m (9,800 ft)

Lithology
- Primary: mudstone
- Other: siltstone, sandstone

Location
- Region: Isle of Man
- Country: United Kingdom (Crown dependency)
- Extent: almost all of Isle of Man

Type section
- Named for: Isle of Man

The Manx Group is an Ordovician lithostratigraphic group (a sequence of rock strata) in the Isle of Man in the Irish Sea. The name is derived from the name of the island which is largely formed from them; these rocks have also previously been referred to as the Manx Slates or Manx Slates Series. The group comprises dark mudstones with siltstone laminae and some sandstones and which exceed a thickness of 3000m. It is divided into a lowermost Glen Dhoo Formation which is overlain by (though the entire known boundary is faulted) the Lonan, Mull Hill, Creg Agneash and Maughold formations in ascending order. A fault separates these from the overlying Barrule, Injebreck, Glen Rushen and Creggan Mooar formations which are in turn separated by a fault from an overlying Ladyport Formation.

In stratigraphic order (youngest at top) the formations are:

- Ladyport—faulted boundary--
- Creggan Mooar
- Glen Rushen
- Injebreck
- Barrule—faulted boundary--
- Maughold
- Creg Agneash
- Mull Hill
- Lonan
  - Ny Garvain member
  - Santon member
  - Keristal member—faulted boundary--
- Glen Dhoo
