= Cronk ny Arrey Laa =

439m high mountain in Isle of Man

Coordinates: 54.137°N 4.718°W

Highest point
- Elevation: 437 m (1,434 ft)
- Prominence: 126 m (413 ft)

Naming
- English translation: Hill of the Day Watch
- Language of name: Manx

Geography
- Location: Isle of Man

Cronk ny Arrey Laa is a hill in the south west of the Isle of Man. It may be confused with a hill of a similar name in the parish of Jurby, further north along the west coast of the island.

At 437 m (1,434 ft) it is the second highest hill in this part of the island, after the South Barrule, 2 miles (3 km) to the east. It is in the parish of Rushen, although the boundary with the parish of Patrick is only about 200 metres to the north of its summit.

== Name ==
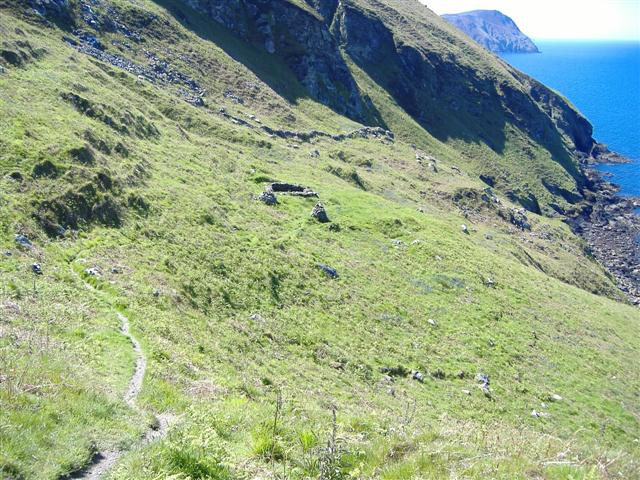
Lag ny Keeilley (hollow of the church) on Cronk ny Arrey Laa; the Manx language has had a substantial influence on the island's toponymy and nomenclature.

Its name means Hill of the Day Watch due to it having been used as a look out post for invaders during the time of the Viking invasions.

The hill is also known locally as Cronk ny Irree-Laa, meaning hill of the rising day or dawn. It was said that when the sun broke over this hill, it was a sign to the herring-fishers to shoot their nets.

== Features ==
Its steep western slope rises directly out of the sea in a cliff.

The area surrounding it has also been described by Trail Magazine as "some of the wildest terrain on any British coast path". and by Manx National Heritage as "amongst the most spectacular to be seen anywhere in the British Isles."

However, the summit is only about 500 metres from the main road between Port Erin/Port St Mary and Peel, and may be climbed as part of an easy day walk between those places. The summit is on the long-distance path, the Raad ny Foillan.

The summit is one of the few places anywhere with views of what Manx people call "the six kingdoms" (Mann, England, Scotland, Ireland, Wales, and Heaven), with some adding a seventh "kingdom", Neptune (the sea). The boggy slopes are home to unusual plant species such as the carnivorous sundew.

== Pilgrimage site ==
This is an ancient place of Christian pilgrimage going back to the days of the Celtic Church. Two particular sites on the slopes of Cronk ny Arrey Laa were visited: the holy well known as "Chibbyr ny Vashtey" ("The Well of Baptism") and the ruins of a Keeill (parish church, hermitage, or monastery) at Lag ny Keeilley on the steep western face, which remained a burial ground until c. 1800.
