= Bradda Hill =

Coordinates: 54.103°N 4.765°W

- Cronk Vradda
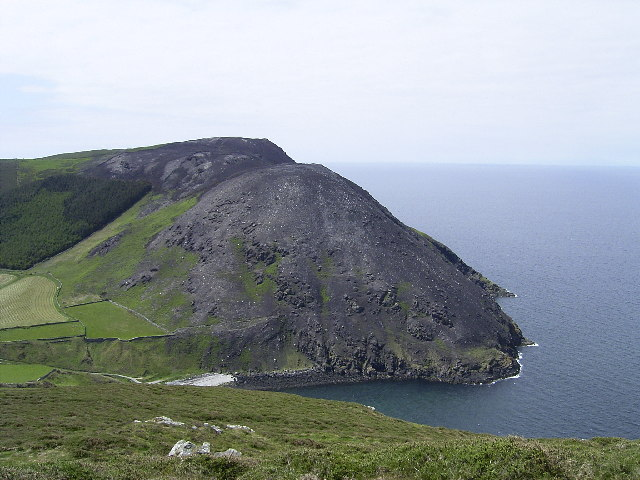
- Bradda Hill from the north after a gorse fire

Highest point
- Elevation: 233 m (764 ft)
- Prominence: c. 205 m
- Listing: Marilyn

Geography
- Location: Isle of Man
- OS grid: SC193711
- Topo map: OS Landranger 95

Bradda Hill (Manx: Cronk Vradda) is a headland some 2 kilometres (1.2 mi) north of the village of Port Erin on the Isle of Man. It is not to be confused with Bradda Head which is about 2 kilometres (1.2 mi) to the SW.

The path to the summit from Bradda West is part of the Raad ny Foillan, the Isle of Man Coast long distance footpath. Cliffs drop from the summit down to the sea. It shelters Fleshwick Bay from the west. A gorse fire in October 2003 took two days to control, five days to die, and scarred Bradda Hill and other headlands around Fleshwick.

View from Bradda Hill, looking towards Port St. Mary and Castletown
