= Slieau Freoaghane =

Coordinates: 54.263°N 4.550°W

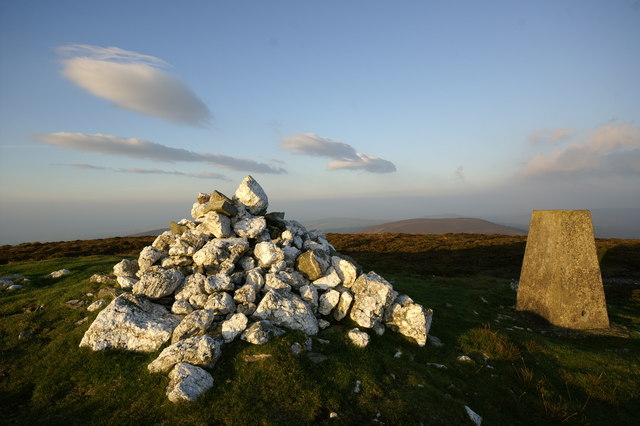
- Summit cairn and trig point on Slieau Freoaghane

Highest point
- Elevation: 488 m (1,601 ft)
- Prominence: c. 153 m
- Listing: Marilyn

Naming
- English translation: bilberry mountain
- Language of name: Manx

Geography
- Location: Isle of Man
- OS grid: SC34158831
- Topo map: OS Landranger 95

Slieau Freoaghane (pronounced [sluː fəˈɾaːn]; Manx for 'mountain of the bilberry') is a hill on the Isle of Man, and the second highest of the Island's five Marilyns. It is located in the Sheading of Michael and can be climbed from Kirk Michael or Barregarrow to the west, from Brandy Cottage to the south, or from Druidale in the east. The summit is marked with a trig point.

== See also ==
- Hills and mountains of the Isle of Man
- Geography of the Isle of Man
