= Niarbyl, Isle of Man =

Promontory on the Isle of Man

Coordinates: 54°9′49.7″N 4°44′24.3″W

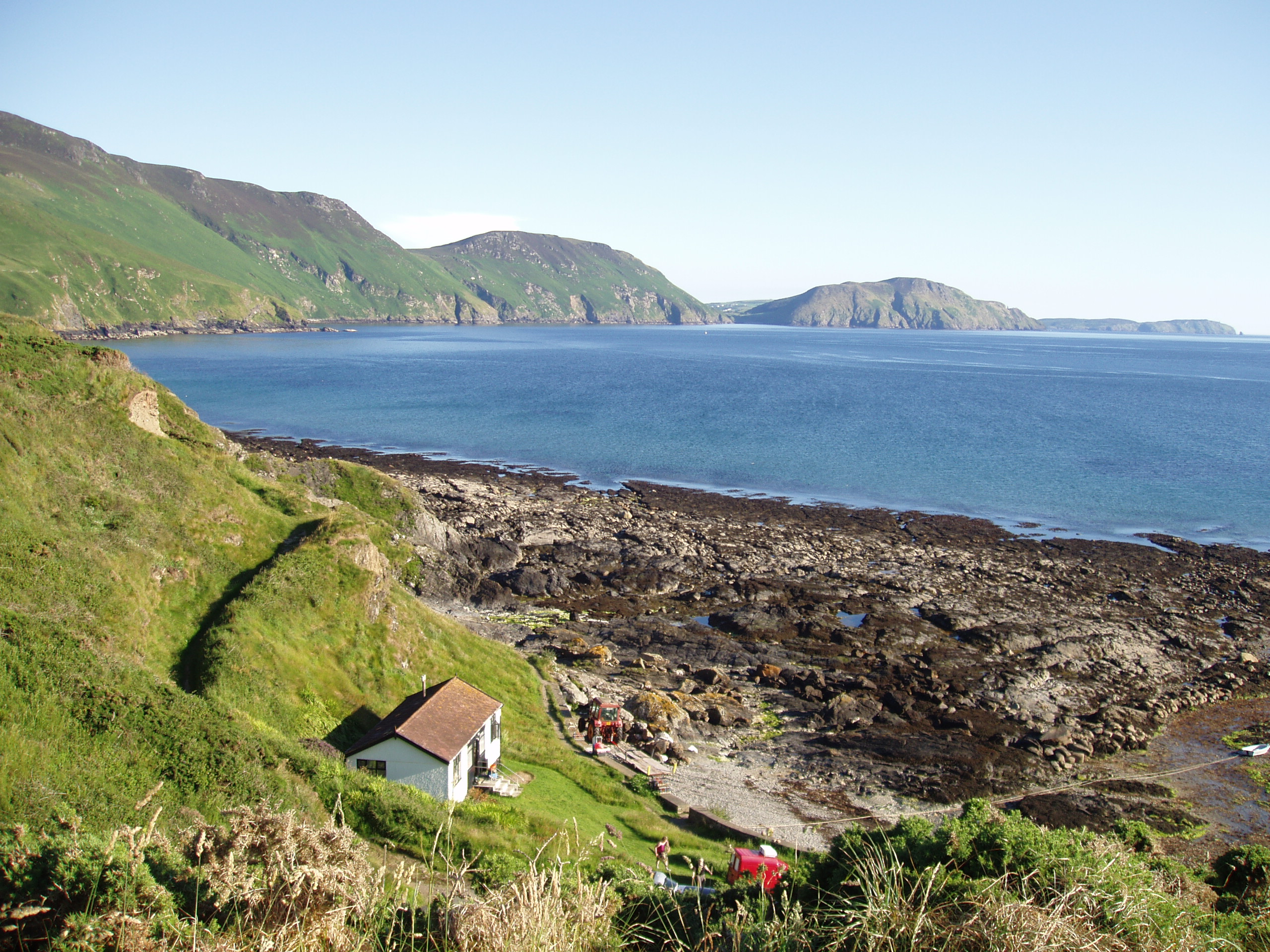
View to the south across Niarbyl Bay of the southwest coastline of the Isle of Man and Calf of Man.

Niarbyl (Manx: Yn Arbyl "the tail" for the way it extends into the Irish Sea) is a rocky promontory on the southwest coast of the Isle of Man between Port Erin and Peel. It is best known for its spectacular sea views which include the Calf of Man and, on clear days, the mountains of Ireland.

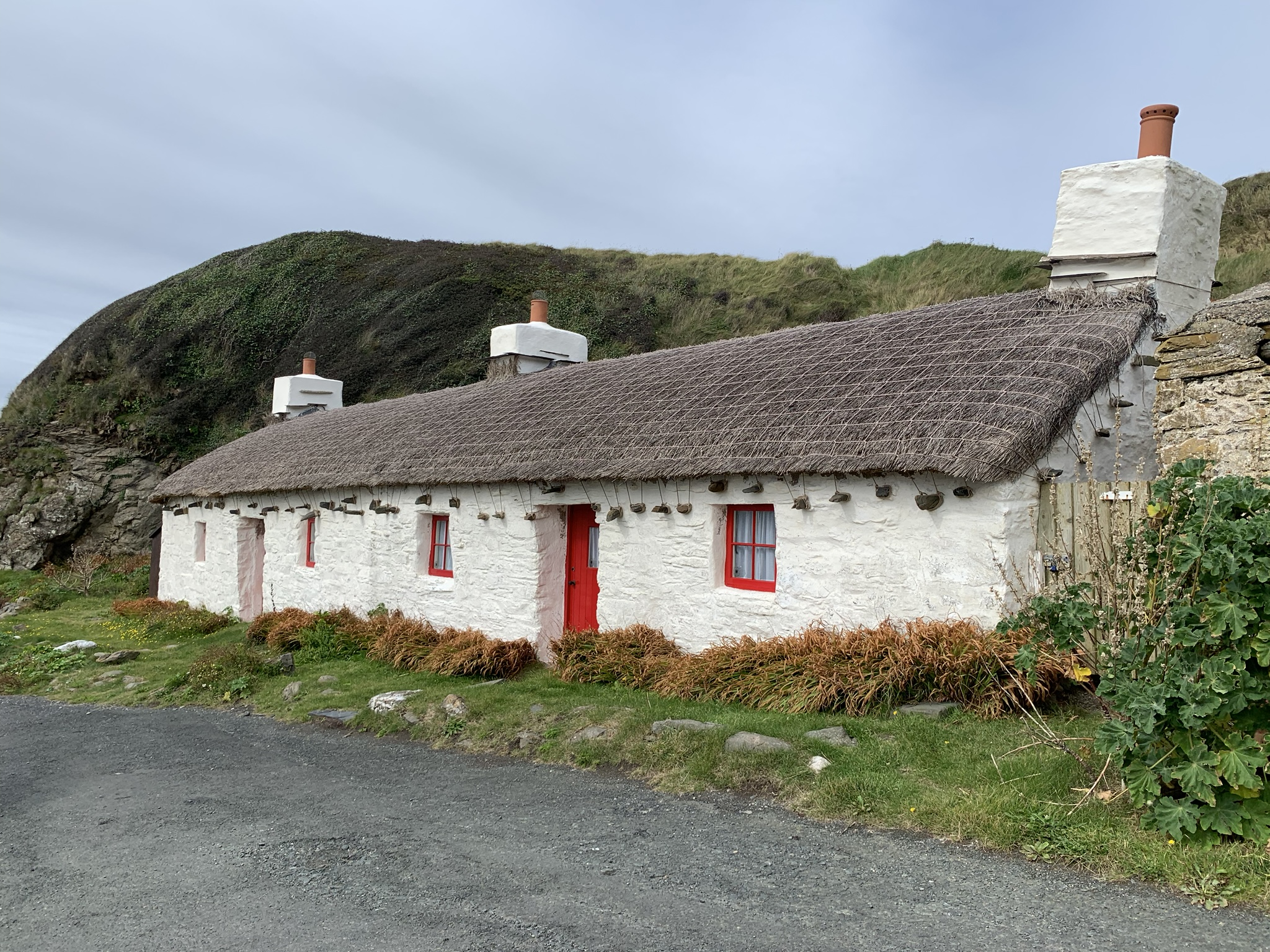

Its access road branches from the A27 road at Dalby.

Niarbyl Bay and its surrounds are considered an asset of the Manx National Heritage, which oversees the area's preservation as well as the Niarbyl Cafe & Visitor Centre.

One of the fishermen's cottages here was used as Ned Devine's cottage in the 1998 film Waking Ned. In 1968, the same cottage had been used in Nigel Kneale's television adaptation of his book, The Year of the Sex Olympics.

The Niarbyl Fault, a geological fault marking what remains of the former Iapetus Ocean, is located just down the hill from the cafe.

== See also ==
- Dalby
- Caledonian orogeny
- Iapetus Suture
- The Brylcreem Boys
- Waking Ned
