= North Barrule =

Mountain on the Isle of Man

- Baarool Twoaie
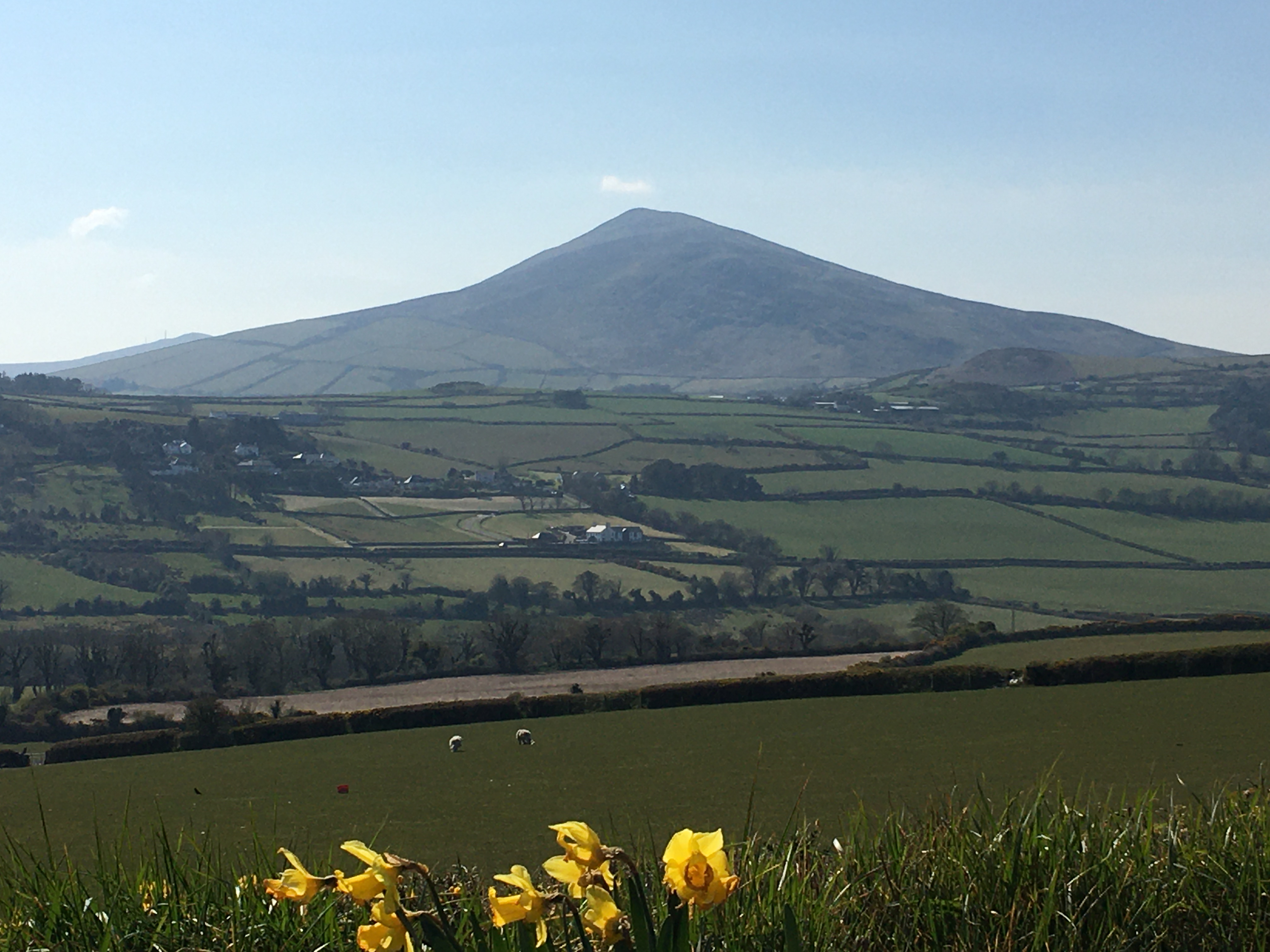
- North Barrule from the east

Highest point
- Elevation: 561.4 m (1,842 ft)
- Coordinates: 54.28°N 4.403°W

Geography
- Country: Isle of Man
- Crown dependency: Isle of Man

North Barrule (Manx: Baarool Twoaie [bǝˈɾǝuil]; Old Norse: varŏa-fjall, lit. 'lookout or cairn mountain') is the second highest peak in the Isle of Man at 565 metres (1,854 ft). From the summit the northern plain of the Isle of Man can be viewed along with the coastlines of Ireland, Cumbria, Wales and Scotland.

North Barrule is located at OS grid reference SC442909 and forms the north-eastern end of a ridge. It forms the boundary between the parishes of Lezayre and Maughold.

== Climbing North Barrule ==
The summit of the North Barrule can be attained by a rough hill walk with no need for technical climbing or scrambling, although certain routes to the summit do provide the possibility for either.

According to the Isle of Man community website:

From the Black Hut, the walker must first ascend the peak of Clagh Ouyr, a short climb which should take no more than 20 minutes to complete. From there, it is a moderate walk along the ridge of hills to the summit of North Barrule. For a walker of average fitness, and at a leisurely pace, it should be a walk of approximately 1.5 - 2 hours. The terrain comprises mostly short, tussocky grass and is marshy in places.

From the Hibernia, follow the footpath signs up the tarmac road until it leads off the road and onto a rough track which winds steadily upwards to the left of the summit, between farm fields. Follow the track round for 40-50 minutes until you are facing the south slopes, above the Corrany Valley (it is also possible to make a longer ascent from the valley floor – turn off the A2 at the foot of the steep hill immediately after Dhoon Village; The Corrany is signposted). Begin to climb up through the fields, passing a ruined farmstead called Park Llewellyn on your left. A vertical dry stone wall winds upwards to the right, guiding towards the summit. Follow this until you meet the ridge path from Clagh Ouyr; after this, the path to the summit is clear. This route offers a shorter but more demanding walk.

== Aircraft crash ==
On 23 April 1945, a Boeing B-17 Flying Fortress crashed into the east side of the North Barrule, killing all 31 people on board. This is the deadliest aviation accident to have occurred on Manx soil.

== See also ==
- List of aviation accidents and incidents in the Isle of Man
- South Barrule
- Snaefell
