= Isle of Man Transport =

Mass transit and heritage transport provider, Isle of Man

Isle of Man Public Transport
- Isle of Man Government Crest
- Company type: Government Agency
- Headquarters: Transport Headquarters, Banks Circus, Douglas, Isle of Man, IM1 5PT
- Area served: Isle of Man
- Services: Public Transport
- Owner: Isle of Man Government
- Parent: Department of Infrastructure
- Website: iombusandrail.info

Isle of Man Public Transport also known as Isle of Man Transport and Isle of Man Transport Services, is a division of the Isle of Man Government's Department of Infrastructure that operates public transport on the Isle of Man.

The division operates the following services:

- Bus Vannin, island-wide daily bus service
- Isle of Man Railway, Douglas - Castletown - Port Erin (seasonal)
- Manx Electric Railway, Douglas - Laxey - Ramsey (seasonal)
- Snaefell Mountain Railway, Laxey - Bungalow - Snaefell summit (seasonal)

and later-added, the Douglas Bay Horse Tramway, previously operated by local authority Douglas Corporation.

The four railways are operated under the banner of Isle of Man (Heritage) Railways, and the Isle of Man Transport, previously seen on buses, is defunct, with buses operating as Bus Vannin since 2009.

In addition to these services, there are other forms of public transport on the island that are not government-owned and operated: these include Protours (Isle of Man), an independent coach company. There are also three privately owned and operated short-distance tourist railways: the Groudle Glen Railway, the Great Laxey Mine Railway, and The Orchid Line (a miniature railway within the Curraghs Wildlife Park).
