= South Barrule =

Hill on the Isle of Man

Coordinates: 54.149°N 4.670°W

- Baarool Jiass
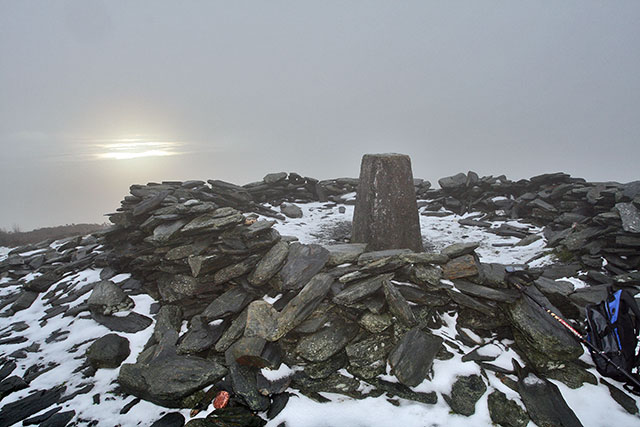

Highest point
- Elevation: 483 m (1,585 ft)
- Prominence: c. 338 m (1109 ft)
- Listing: Marilyn

Naming
- English translation: Guard fell
- Language of name: Old Norse
- Pronunciation: /bɑːˈruːl/

Geography
- Location: Isle of Man
- OS grid: SC257759
- Topo map: OS Landranger 95

The South Barrule (Manx: Baarool Jiass) is the highest hill in the south of the Isle of Man. It has the remains of a fort on its summit, which is traditionally the home of the Manx god of the sea Mannanan beg mac y Leir. The hill is largely surrounded by conifer plantations. On the south western slope of the hill the Cringle Reservoir was formed to supply water to the southern part of the island. South Barrule's ancient name was Warfield or Wardfell.

A short, straight footpath links the summit with a small saddle known as the Round Table, through which pass the Bayr ny Skeddan walking route, the A27 Colby to Peel road and the A36 Sloc road.

South Barrule is noted for its extensive views from the summit. On clear days, it's possible to make out all four countries of the UK and Ireland at once. Looking south-west lies the Calf of Man, followed by the distant Wicklow Mountains of Ireland. Looking west/north-west, lie the Mourne Mountains and the Glens of Antrim of Northern Ireland. To the north, Snaefell, North Barrule and southern coastline of Scotland are easily visible. To the east, lie the mountains of the Lake District in England. To the south, the northern coastline of Anglesey and more remarkably, on exceptionally clear days, the mountains of Snowdonia and the Great Orme in Wales are all visible.

There is also a North Barrule in the Isle of Man. The word Barrule (Manx: Baarool) features in the Manx national anthem, in which the Island is said to be "firm as Barrule".
