= Snaefell =

Mountain on the Isle of Man

- Sniaull
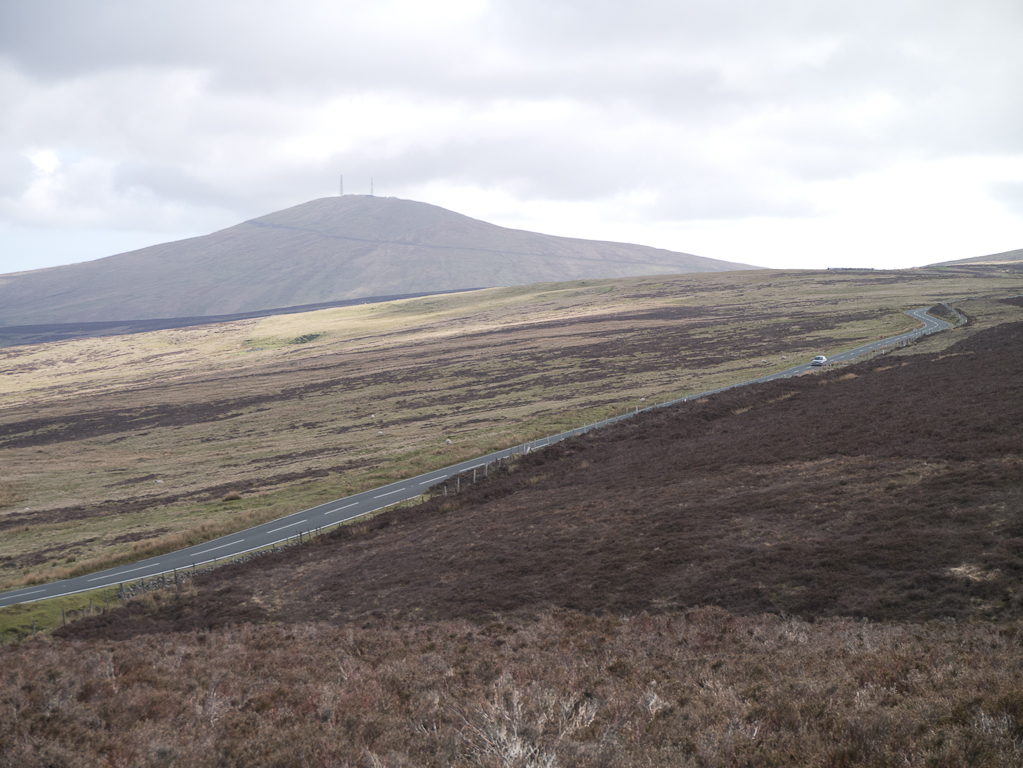
- Snaefell viewed from minor Beinn-y-phott Road, connecting Brandywell on the mountain to minor lowland places in the island's centre

Highest point
- Elevation: 2,037 ft (621 m)
- Prominence: 2,037 ft (621 m)
- Parent peak: none – HP Isle of Man
- Listing: Marilyn, Hardy
- Coordinates: 54°15′47.8″N 04°27′41.8″W

Naming
- English translation: snow fell
- Language of name: Old Norse
- Pronunciation: /ˈsneɪfɛl/

Geography
- Location within Isle of Man
- Location: Isle of Man
- OS grid: SC397881
- Topo map: OS Landranger 95

Snaefell (Old Norse: snjœ-fjall/snjó-fall, "snow mountain"; Manx: Sniaull) is the highest mountain and the only summit above 2,000 feet (610 m) on the Isle of Man, at 2,037 feet (620.9 m) above sea level. The summit is crowned by a railway station, cafe, and several communications masts, and can be reached by narrow gauge railway.

== Views ==
It is a well-known saying in the Isle of Man that on a clear day six kingdoms can be seen from the top: the Isle of Man, England, Ireland, Scotland, Wales and Heaven. Some versions add a seventh kingdom, that of Manannán (or the sea).

The summit plaque indicates the directions of five points from Snaefell as well as their distances:

- 31 miles (50 km) to the Mull of Galloway (Scotland)
- 51 miles (82 km) to Scafell (England)
- 66 miles (106 km) to the Mountains of Mourne (Northern Ireland)
- 85 miles (137 km) to Liverpool (England)
- 97 miles (156 km) to Dublin (Republic of Ireland)

(For some reason, Wales is absent from the plaque).

While highly dependent on weather conditions and visibility, all of the four countries of the United Kingdom can be seen from the summit of Snaefell. This includes much of the southern coast of Dumfries and Galloway in Scotland, the Lake District in England, the northern coast of Anglesey in Wales, and the Mountains of Mourne in Northern Ireland. Points in the Republic of Ireland in County Louth can also be seen.

== Climbing Snaefell ==
The Snaefell Mountain Railway has a seasonal electric tram service, typically from April to October, which climbs the four miles (six kilometres) from Laxey to the summit.

The A18 Snaefell Mountain Road passes over the slopes of Snaefell, and is the highest section of the Snaefell Mountain Course over which the Isle of Man TT races are held. Walkers often use the car park on this road near the Bungalow railway station (last railway stop before the summit) from which there is a rough path to the peak. The trail has sections of gravel, slate stones, grass and rock. While the angle of ascent steepens significantly closer to the summit, special climbing equipment is not required. However, caution is required in steep areas as the grass, earth and rocks are often slippery. Average climb time on foot on a dry footpath is about 45 minutes.

A geodetic marker embedded in the small, concrete obelisk indicates the true mountain summit. The rock cairn standing nearby has an information plaque on top.

== Weather ==
In 1970, the automated weather station at the Snaefell summit recorded a gust of 150 mph (65 m/s) which was one of the highest wind speeds ever recorded in the British Isles. During hurricane storm-force winds, the 120-foot-tall (37 m) Civil Aviation Authority radio mast at the Snaefell summit was damaged and blown down on 2 December 1966.

== Gallery ==
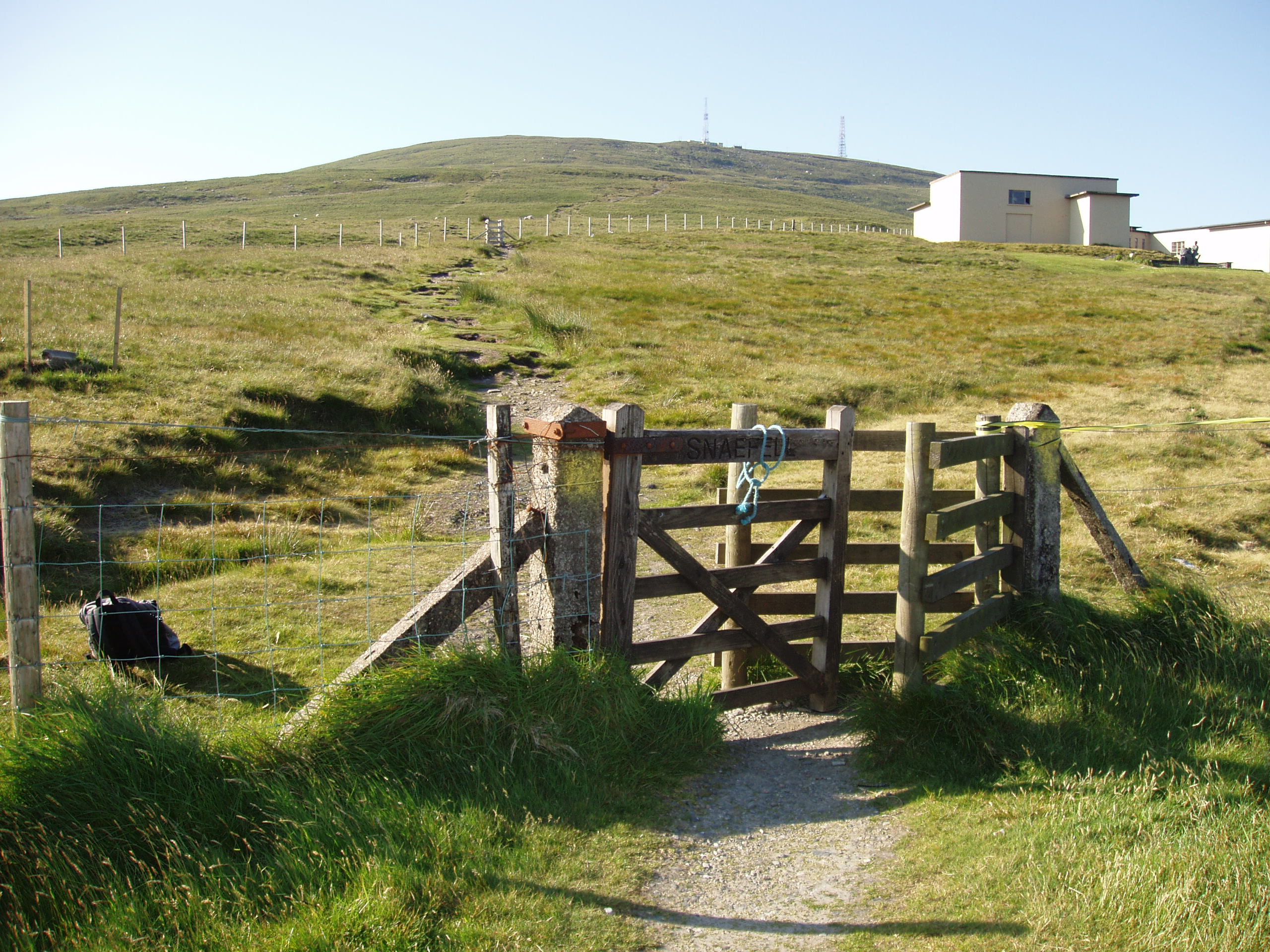
Footpath entry near Bungalow railway station typically used to climb Snaefell

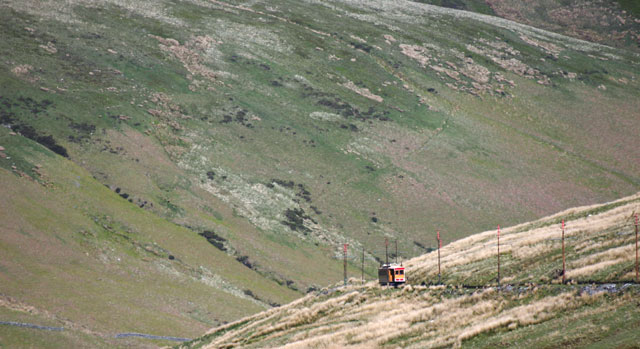
The Snaefell Mountain Railway on the ascent of Snaefell

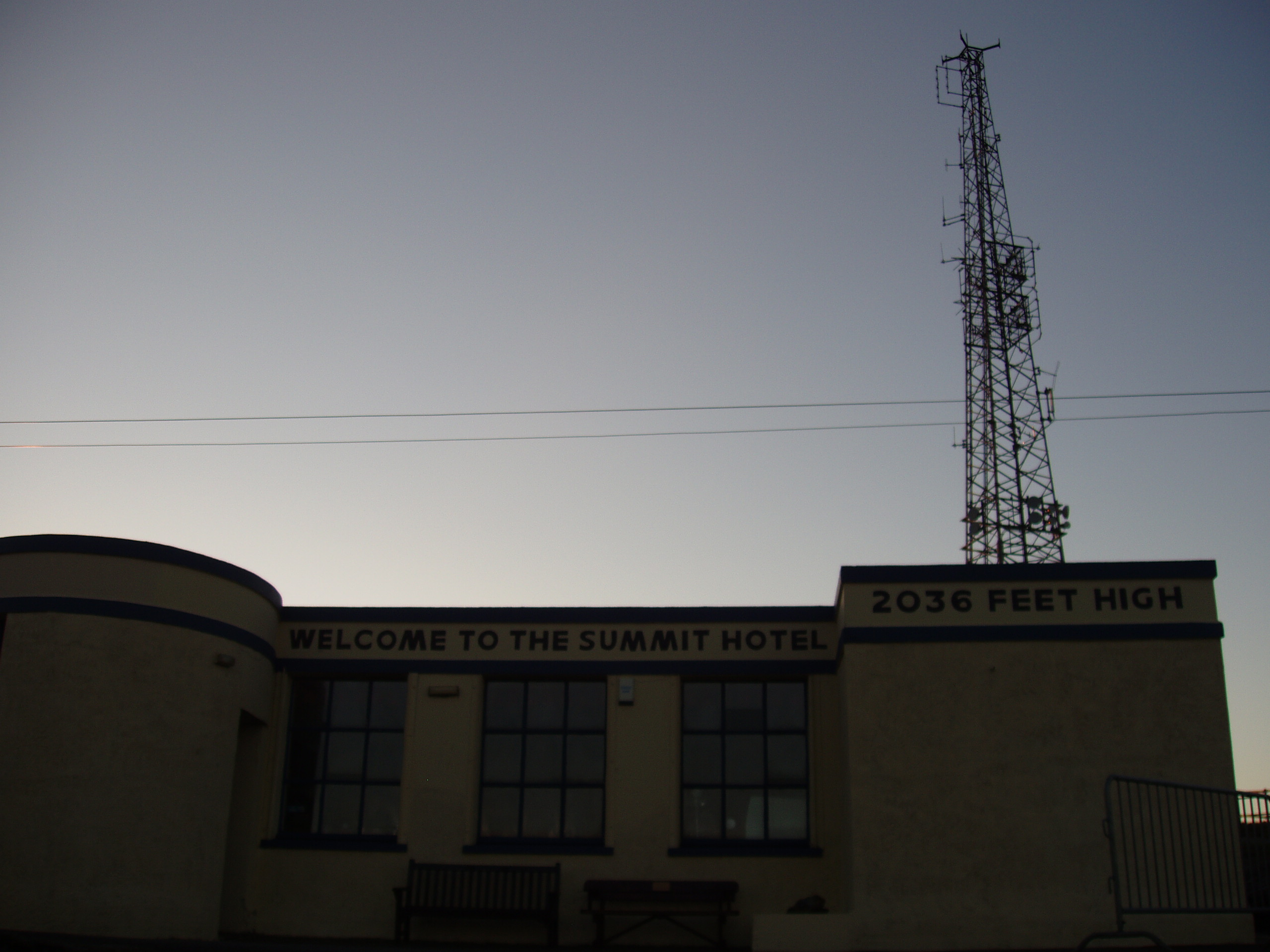
Defunct hotel (now cafe) near the summit

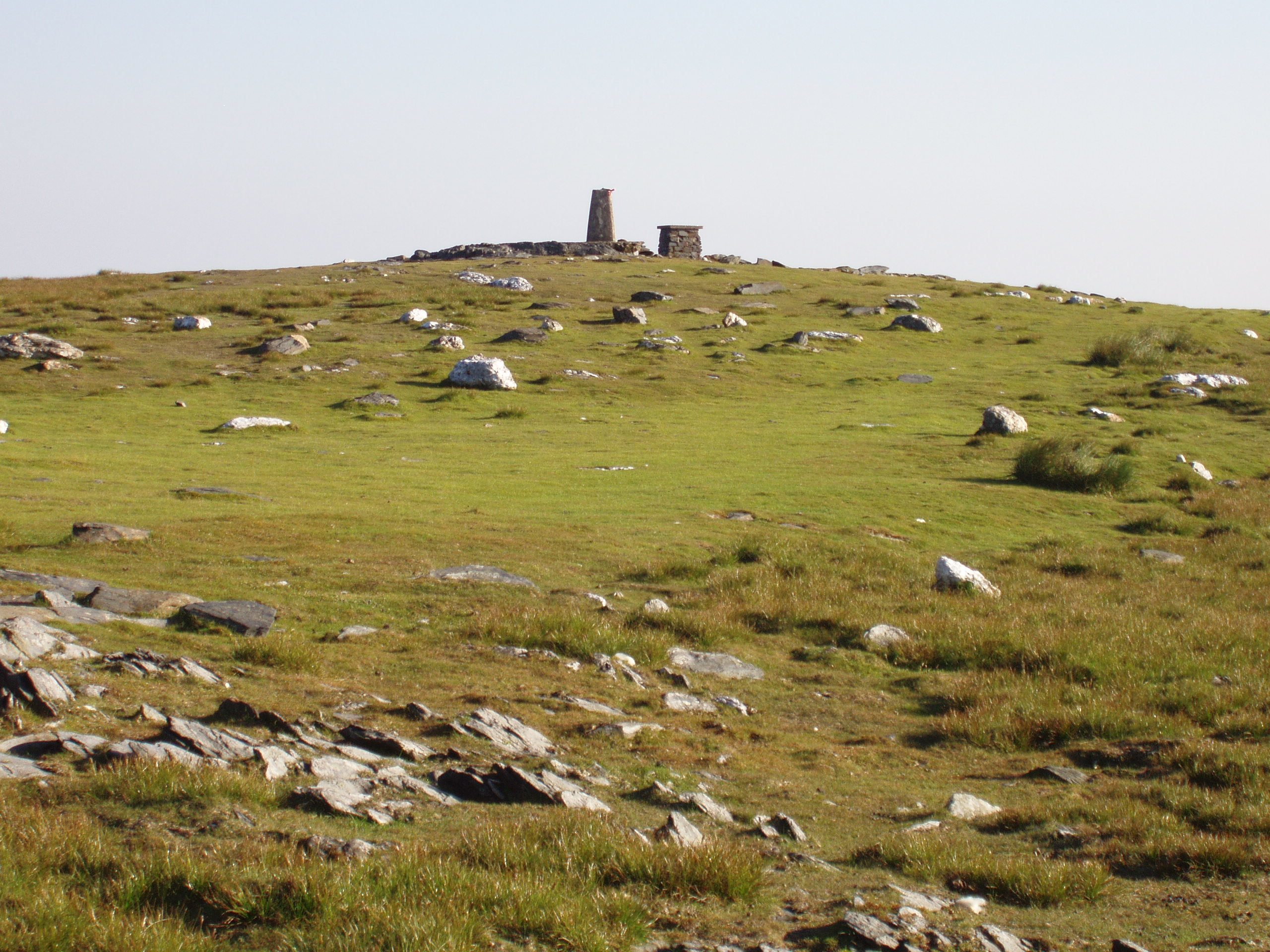
Top of Snaefell with geodetic marker and nearby cairn with plaque

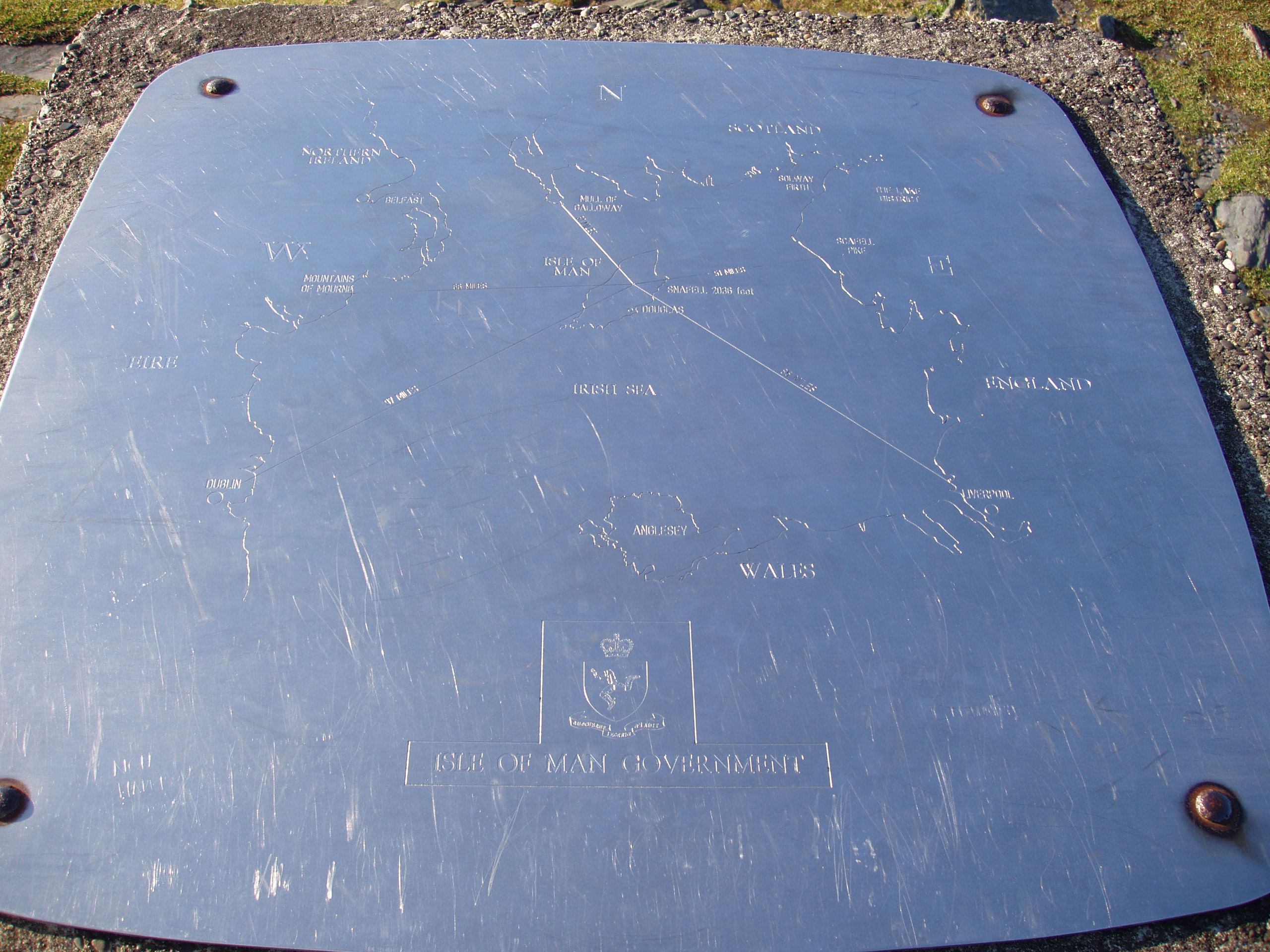
Plaque pointing out the directions of landmarks and their distances from the summit

== See also ==
- Snaefell Mine
