= Manx Electric Trailers 40–43 =

Electric trailer

Trailer Nos. 40 – 43
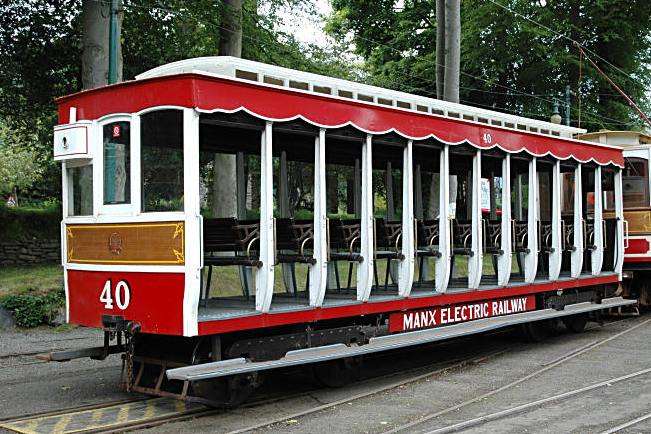
- Manufacturer: G.F. Milnes & Co., Ltd.
- Built at: Cleveland Street Works, Birkenhead
- Constructed: 1903, replacements built 1930
- Number built: 4 originals, 2 replacements
- Number in service: 2 originals, 2 replacements
- Formation: Open Crossbench
- Capacity: 44 Passengers
- Operator: Isle Of Man Heritage Railways
- Depot: Derby Castle Depôt

This article details Trailer Nos. 40–43 of the Manx Electric Railway on the Isle of Man.

Trailer Nos. 40 and 41 were lost in the Laxey Car Sheds fire of 1930, but were replaced the same year with new trailers of similar construction. They are the youngest rolling stock on the line, save for the motor car No.22 which was completely rebuilt following a fire in 1992 and converted trailer No.56.
Trailer Nos. 42 and 43 are still the originals and are both fully operational and in service.

No.	Builder	Seating	Livery	Seats	Notes
No.40 (Original)	G.F. Milnes & Co., Ltd.	Crossbench	Red, White & Teak	44	Lost, Laxey Shed Fire 1930
No.40 (Replacement)	G.F. Milnes & Co., Ltd.	Crossbench	Red, White & Teak	44	Overhauled in 2009, repainted in 2014/15
No.41 (Original)	G.F. Milnes & Co., Ltd.	Crossbench	Red, White & Teak	44	Lost, Laxey Shed Fire 1930
No.41 (Replacement)	G.F. Milnes & Co., Ltd.	Crossbench	Red, White & Teak	44	Used throughout the year
No.42	G.F. Milnes & Co., Ltd.	Crossbench	Ivory, White & Teak	44	Part of the general service fleet
No.43	G.F. Milnes & Co., Ltd.	Crossbench	Red, White & Teak	44	Less favourable due to heavier weight

== See also ==
- Manx Electric Railway rolling stock

== Sources ==
- Manx Manx Electric Railway Fleetlist (2002) Manx Electric Railway Society
- Island Island Images: Manx Electric Railway Pages (2003) Jon Wornham
- Official Official Tourist Department Page (2009) Isle Of Man Heritage Railways
- Trailers | Manx Electric Railway Online Manx Electric Railway official website
