= Manx Electric Railway rolling stock =

This page details the rolling stock on the Manx Electric Railway on the Isle of Man, which is unique insofar as the railway still operates with its original tramcars and trailers, all of which are over one hundred years old, the latest dating from 1906. Save for a fire in 1930 in which four cars and seven trailers were lost, all of the line's original rolling stock remains extant, though many items have been out of use for a number of years, largely due to the decrease in tourism on the island over the last thirty years. Despite this, members of each class are still represented on site today, though not all are in original form or in regular use.

== Motors ==
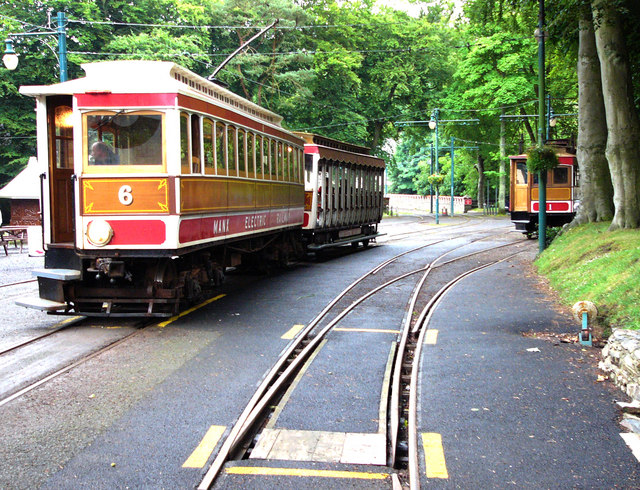
"Tunnel" Car No.6

A total of 33 motor cars were provided to the railway from its inception in 1893 (the last was delivered in 1906), and most of these survive today except where noted below. These tramcars are in a variety of styles, ranging from closed saloons to open toastracks, and were delivered in batches from various manufacturers. Today the serviceable fleet appear in a variety of historical livery styles. There are presently a total of fourteen working cars. Notable among these are their original two, which hold the Guinness World Record as the oldest operational tramcars still in regular use on their original line. Also of note are Winter Saloon No. 22, which was rebuilt after a fire in 1991, and works car No. 34, which began life as a replica works vehicle for the Snaefell Mountain Railway.

Key:	In Service	In Storage	Undergoing Rebuild	Scrapped

No.	Year	Builder	Type	Livery	Seats	Notes
1	1893	G.F. Milnes & Co., Ltd.	Unvestibuled Saloon	Maroon & Ivory	34	Original Colourscheme
2	1893	G.F. Milnes & Co., Ltd.	Unvestibuled Saloon	Maroon & Ivory	34	Original Colourscheme
3	1893	G.F. Milnes & Co., Ltd.	Unvestibuled Saloon	Red, White & Teak	34	Lost, Laxey Shed Fire 1930
4	1894	G.F. Milnes & Co., Ltd.	Tunnel Car	Red, White & Teak	36	Lost, Laxey Shed Fire 1930
5	1894	G.F. Milnes & Co., Ltd.	Tunnel Car	Red, White & Teak	32	Early 1970s Livery
6	1894	G.F. Milnes & Co., Ltd.	Tunnel Car	~	36	Undergoing bodywork overhaul
7	1894	G.F. Milnes & Co., Ltd.	Tunnel Car	Blue, White & Teak	32	"Original" Livery Scheme
8	1894	G.F. Milnes & Co., Ltd.	Tunnel Car	Red, White & Teak	36	Lost, Laxey Shed Fire 1930
9	1894	G.F. Milnes & Co., Ltd.	Tunnel Car	Red, White & Teak	36	Repainted 2023/4
10	1895	G.F. Milnes & Co., Ltd.	Vestibuled Saloon	Freight Grey	48	Used for special trips
11	1895	G.F. Milnes & Co., Ltd.	Vestibuled Saloon	Blue, Teak & Grey	~	Scrapped in 1926
12	1895	G.F. Milnes & Co., Ltd.	Vestibuled Saloon	Blue, Teak & Grey	~	Scrapped in 1927
13	1895	G.F. Milnes & Co., Ltd.	Vestibuled Saloon	Freight Grey	~	Scrapped in 1957
14	1898	G.F. Milnes & Co., Ltd.	Open Crossbench	Maroon & White	56	Used for special events
15	1898	G.F. Milnes & Co., Ltd.	Open Crossbench	Red & White	56	Stored, partly stripped
16	1898	G.F. Milnes & Co., Ltd.	Open Crossbench	Red & White	56	Used in summer and special events
17	1898	G.F. Milnes & Co., Ltd.	Open Crossbench	Red & White	56	Stored, heavily stripped
18	1898	G.F. Milnes & Co., Ltd.	Open Crossbench	Red & White	56	Stored, unmaintained
19	1899	G.F. Milnes & Co., Ltd.	Closed Saloon	Cream & Teak	48	Rarely out of traffic
20	1899	G.F. Milnes & Co., Ltd.	Closed Saloon	Red, White & Teak	48	Part of general running fleet
21	1899	G.F. Milnes & Co., Ltd.	Closed Saloon	Red, White & Teak	48	Regularly runs 10,000+ miles per year
22	1899	G.F. Milnes & Co., Ltd.	Closed Saloon	Red, White & Teak	48	Used throughout the year
23	1900	I.o.M.T. & E.P. Co.	Centre-Cab Locomotive	Green & Freight Grey	24	Stored in Laxey Car Shed
24	1898	G.F. Milnes & Co., Ltd.	Open Paddlebox	Red, White & Teak	56	Lost, Laxey Shed Fire 1930
25	1898	G.F. Milnes & Co., Ltd.	Open Paddlebox	White Undercoat	56	Stored, Laxey Car Sheds
26	1898	G.F. Milnes & Co., Ltd.	Open Paddlebox	Red & White	56	Stored, Laxey Car Shed
27	1898	G.F. Milnes & Co., Ltd.	Open Paddlebox	Red & White with Wasp Stripes	36	Stored, Laxey Car Shed
28	1904	E.R.T.C. Co., Ltd.	Open Crossbench	Red & White	56	Stored, Laxey Car Shed
29	1904	E.R.T.C. Co., Ltd.	Open Crossbench	Red & White	56	Undergoing restoration
30	1904	E.R.T.C. Co., Ltd.	Open Crossbench	Red & White	56	Stored, Laxey Car Shed
31	1904	E.R.T.C. Co., Ltd.	Open Crossbench	Red & White	56	Stored, Laxey Car Sheds
32	1906	United Electric Car Co., Ltd.	Open Crossbench	Nationalised Green	56	Part of general running fleet
33	1906	United Electric Car Co., Ltd.	Open Crossbench	Maroon & White	56	Undergoing overhaul
34*	1994/5	Manx Electric Railway	Works Car (Two Cabs/Open Wagon)	Grey	N/A	Departmental use only, in regular use *No.7 as of 2025

== Trailers ==
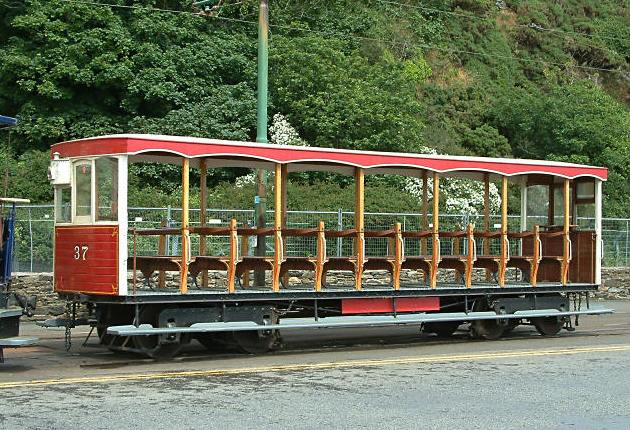
Trailer No. 37

The ages of the trailer cars are similar to the power cars: they were delivered in batches between 1893 and 1903, with further examples in 1930 replacing stock lost in the shed fire at Laxey that year. The majority of the trailers are of the toastrack style, and there are four saloons (one of which is a rebuilt toastrack converted for disabled access passengers). A total of twenty-one of these trailers are available and in regular use, each carrying a variety of livery styles to match their power cars when possible. Some have had their bodies removed for departmental use over the years, while others have been restored to their original condition, carrying original fleet numbers where full restorations have been completed: for instance No.36 now carries the original No.19 number complete with curtains. Early examples were not provided with a roof when built, but roofs were quickly added, as they proved to be practical necessities.

Key:	In Service	In Storage	Undergoing Rebuild	Scrapped

No.	Year	Builder	Type	Livery	Seats	Notes
34	1894	G.F. Milnes & Co., Ltd.	Open 'Lightweight'	Red & Brown	44	Lost, Laxey Shed Fire 1930
35	1894	G.F. Milnes & Co., Ltd.	Open 'Lightweight'	Red & Brown	44	Lost, Laxey Shed Fire 1930
36*	1894	G.F. Milnes & Co., Ltd.	Open 'Lightweight'	Maroon & Teak	44	*Currently serves as Trailer No.19
37	1894	G.F. Milnes & Co., Ltd.	Open 'Lightweight'	Red & White	44	Overhauled in 2019
38	1894	G.F. Milnes & Co., Ltd.	Open 'Lightweight'	Red & Brown	44	Lost, Laxey Shed Fire 1930
39	1894	G.F. Milnes & Co., Ltd.	Open 'Lightweight'	Red & Brown	44	Lost, Laxey Shed Fire 1930
40	1930	G.F. Milnes & Co., Ltd.	Open Crossbench	Red, White & Teak	44	Replacement for fire victim
41	1930	G.F. Milnes & Co., Ltd.	Open Crossbench	Red, White & Teak	44	Replacement for fire victim
42	1903	G.F. Milnes & Co., Ltd.	Open Crossbench	Ivory, White & Teak	44	Part of the general service fleet
43	1903	G.F. Milnes & Co., Ltd.	Open Crossbench	Red, White & Teak	44	Less favourable due to heavier weight
44	1930	English Electric Co.	Open Crossbench	Red, White & Teak	44	Replacement for fire victim
45	1899	G.F. Milnes & Co., Ltd.	Stripped Down to Flatbed Wagon	Yellow & Black	N/A	Scrapped in 2021
46	1899	G.F. Milnes & Co., Ltd.	Open Crossbench	~	44	Undergoing restoration
47	1899	G.F. Milnes & Co., Ltd.	Open Crossbench	Red, White & Teak	44	Returned to service in March 2025
48	1899	G.F. Milnes & Co., Ltd.	Open Crossbench	Red, White & Teak	44	Returned to service in March 2025
49	1893	G.F. Milnes & Co., Ltd.	Open 'Lightweight'	Maroon & Cream	44	Returned to service in 2019
50	1893	G.F. Milnes & Co., Ltd.	Open 'Lightweight'	Nationalised Green & White	44	Returned to service in 2025
51	1893	G.F. Milnes & Co., Ltd.	Open 'Lightweight'	Maroon & Teak	44	Occasional appearances, though regularly at enthusiast events
52	1898	G.F. Milnes & Co., Ltd.	Flatbed with scissor lift	Yellow & Black	N/A	Used for overhead line maintenance
53	1893	G.F. Milnes & Co., Ltd.	Open 'Lightweight'	Red, White & Teak	44	Stored, Derby Castle Car Shed
54	1893	G.F. Milnes & Co., Ltd.	Open 'Lightweight'	Red & White	44	Returned to service in 2019
55	1904	E.R.T.C. Co., Ltd.	Open Crossbench	Red, White & Teak	44	Stored, Derby Castle Bottom Shed
56	1904	E.R.T.C. Co., Ltd.	Multi-Saloon	Red, White & Teak	12 (Note: Varying with wheelchair passengers.)	Disabled access trailer
57	1904	United Electric Car Co., Ltd.	Closed Saloon	Red, White & Teak	32	Repainted in 2019
58	1904	United Electric Car Co., Ltd.	Closed Saloon	Red, White & Teak	32	Full overhaul & repair in 2015, returned to traffic in 2016
59	1895	G.F. Milnes & Co., Ltd.	Enclosed 'Special Saloon'	Blue & Ivory	18	In regular use
60	1896	G.F. Milnes & Co., Ltd.	Open 'Lightweight'	Red & White	44	Appears rarely or when additional capacity is required
61	1906	United Electric Car Co., Ltd.	Open Crossbench	Red, White & Teak	44	Overhauled in 2016/17
62	1906	United Electric Car Co., Ltd.	Open Crossbench	Nationalised Green	44	Livery matches Car No.32

== Others ==
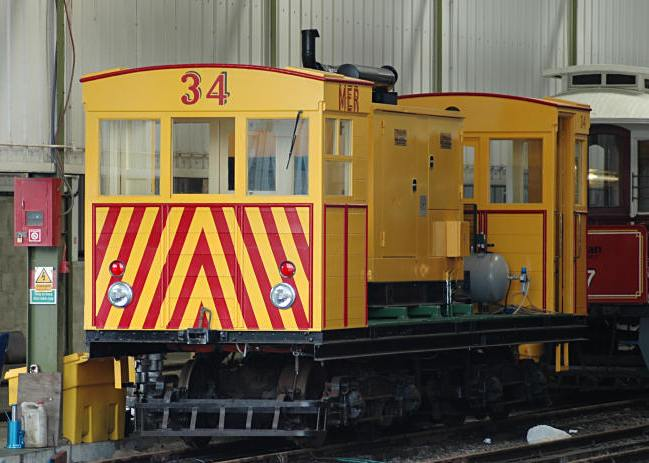
Car No. 34 (Snaefell No. 7 Maria)

Bertie
A contractors' locomotive used when relays were being undertaken. Since moved to UK.

Bungle & Zippy
Hired second-hand from Bord na Móna in 2008 and refurbished on-island for further use on the railway. Since returned to UK.

Bonner Wagons
Road-rail dual purpose wagons dating from the earliest days of the line. None of these are extant today.

Aachen 1010
A Talbot/Kiepe bogie car from Aachen's series 1001-1011, built in 1956-1957 and retired in 1974. It was bought for use but never converted, and spent much of its life as a storage car at the railway's depot.

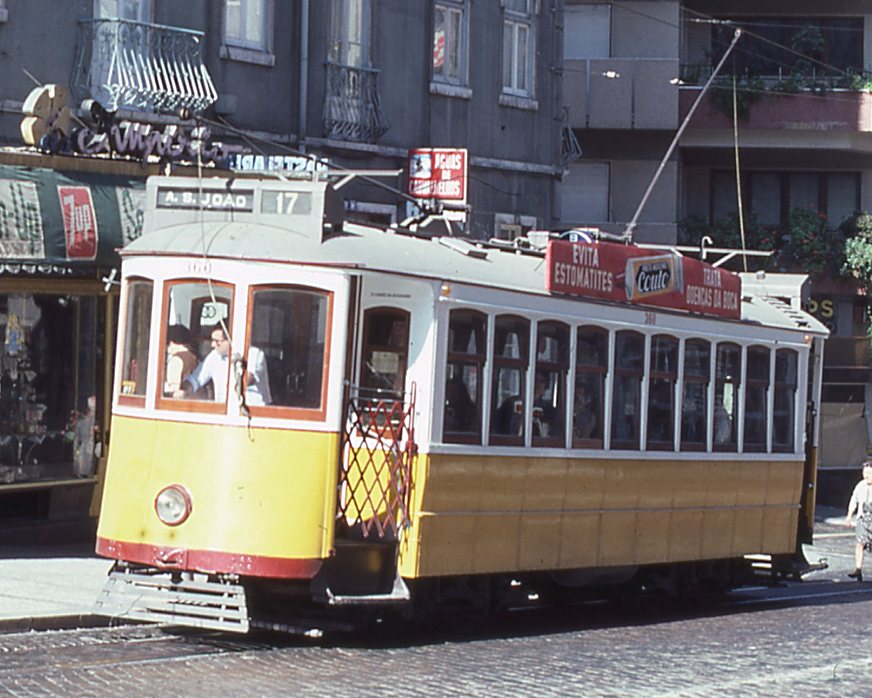
Car CCFL 360 in 1977, still in regular service in Lisbon.

Lisbon 360
A Brill-Stephenson 1907 bogie car in Lisbon's unusual track gauge of 900 mm (2 ft 11 7/16 in), bought for conversion to Manx Electric Railway’s almost identical 3 ft (914 mm) gauge. The conversion was never implemented due to clearance difficulties; it was used as a passenger waiting shelter for a spell; vehicle now in off-site storage on the island.

Dreadnought Trailers
Bogie open wagons with removable sides used for a variety of non-passenger purposes, but particularly associated with stone traffic from Dhoon Quarry, now all scrapped. General 12 ton capacity bogie vehicles.

Four Wheel Goods Vehicles
From 1894 onwards the Douglas and Laxey Electric Tramway and its successors operated a fleet of small four wheel goods wagons, mainly of 5 ton and 6 ton capacity. There were a total of ten opens and eight vans built by Milnes, Milnes Voss, and the MERCo between 1894 and 1912. Some of the vans were painted red and used for mail traffic.

== See also ==
- Heritage railways in the Isle of Man
- Transport on the Isle of Man
- Manx Electric Railway
