= Manx Electric Trailer 60 =

Trailer No.60
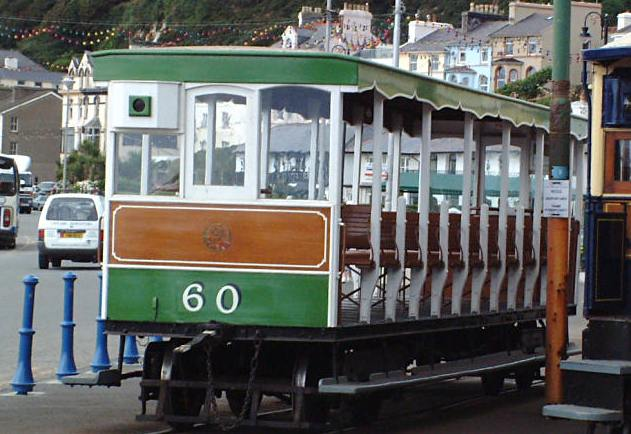
- Trailer No. 60, Derby Castle Terminus
- Manufacturer: G.F. Milnes & Co., Ltd.
- Built at: Cleveland Street Works, Birkenhead
- Constructed: 1896
- Formation: Open 'Lightweight'
- Capacity: 44
- Operators: Isle Of Man Heritage Railways
- Depots: Derby Castle Depôt

Trailer No.60 of the Manx Electric Railway on the Isle of Man, was built as a one-off order in 1896.

No.60 narrowly escaped the 1930 Laxey Car Sheds Fire; it was drawn out during the incident and repaired immediately afterwards. It reentered service a year later.

This trailer has chilled iron wheels making it unique among the fleet; when rounding tight radius curves of which there are many on the line, its wheels make a distinctive shrill ringing noise. It is currently painted in the common red/white liverly, but was painted in the short-lived 1957 nationalisation livery of green and white in the past. It's usually hauled by similarly treated open Car No.16.

No.	Builder	Seating	Livery	Seats	Notes
No.60	G.F. Milnes & Co., Ltd.	Crossbench	Red & White	44	Appears rarely or when additional capacity is required

== See also ==
- Manx Electric Railway rolling stock

== Sources ==
- Manx Manx Electric Railway Fleetlist (2002) Manx Electric Railway Society
- Island Island Images: Manx Electric Railway Pages (2003) Jon Wornham
- Official Official Tourist Department Page (2009) Isle Of Man Heritage Railways
- Trailers | Manx Electric Railway Online Manx Electric Railway official website
