= Manx Electric Trailers 34–39 =

Trailer Nos. 34 – 39
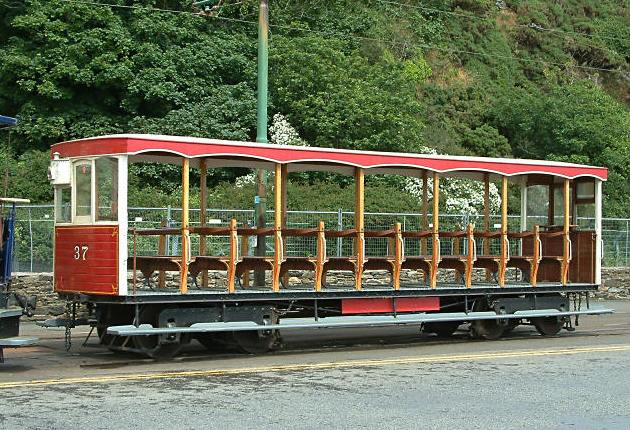
- Manufacturers: G.F. Milnes & Co., Ltd.
- Built at: Cleveland Street Works, Birkenhead, The Wirral
- Constructed: 1894
- Number built: 6
- Number scrapped: 4 (lost in fire)
- Formation: Open 'Lightweight' Trailer
- Capacity: 44 Passengers
- Operator: Isle Of Man Heritage Railways
- Depot: Derby Castle Depôt

This article details Trailer Nos. 34–39 of the Manx Electric Railway on the Isle of Man.

These lightweight trailers were purchased in 1894 for the opening of the new part of the line between Groudle Glen and Laxey Station and were of lightweight construction; of the four supplied only two survive today, with 38 and 39 having been lost in the Laxey Car Sheds fire of 1930 and not replaced. No.36 was relaunched in July 2023 for the Year of the Railways Transport Festival, now sporting its original number, 19. The other surviving member of the fleet, No.37, remains as part of the active fleet, in particular used to accompany Car No.2 as part of the "vintage" set during enthusiasts events. The remaining serviceable trailers are also coloured differently; No.36 in its original maroon/teak colourscheme and No.37 with a red/white colourscheme.

No.	Builder	Seating	Livery	Seats	Notes
No.34	G.F. Milnes & Co., Ltd.	Crossbench	Red & Brown	44	Lost, Laxey Shed Fire 1930
No.35	G.F. Milnes & Co., Ltd.	Crossbench	Red & Brown	44	Lost, Laxey Shed Fire 1930
No.36*	G.F. Milnes & Co., Ltd.	Crossbench	Maroon & Teak	44	*Currently serves as Trailer No.19
No.37	G.F. Milnes & Co., Ltd.	Crossbench	Red & White	44	Overhauled in 2019
No.38	G.F. Milnes & Co., Ltd.	Crossbench	Red & Brown	44	Lost, Laxey Shed Fire 1930
No.39	G.F. Milnes & Co., Ltd.	Crossbench	Red & Brown	44	Lost, Laxey Shed Fire 1930

== See also ==
- Manx Electric Railway rolling stock

== Sources ==
- Manx Manx Electric Railway Fleetlist (2002) Manx Electric Railway Society
- Island Island Images: Manx Electric Railway Pages (2003) Jon Wornham
- Official Official Tourist Department Page (2009) Isle Of Man Heritage Railways
- Trailers | Manx Electric Railway Online Manx Electric Railway official website
