= Manx Electric Trailers 49–54 =

Trailer Nos. 49 – 54
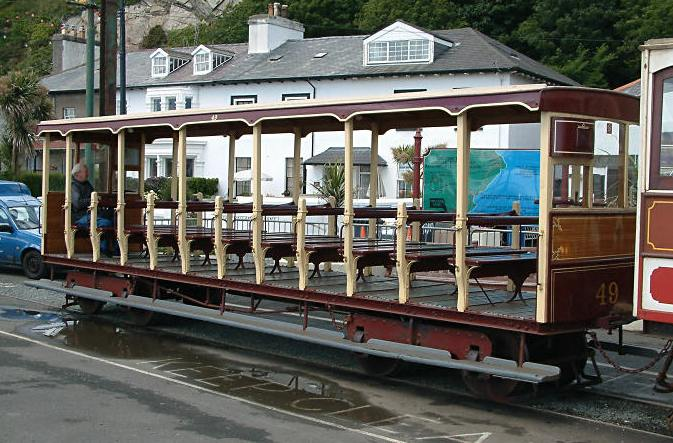
- Trailer No. 49, Derby Castle Terminus
- Manufacturers: G.F. Milnes & Co., Ltd.
- Built at: Cleveland Street Works, Birkenhead
- Constructed: 1893
- Number built: 6
- Number in service: 5
- Formation: Open 'Lightweight'
- Capacity: 44 Passengers
- Operator: Isle Of Man Transport
- Depot: Derby Castle Depôt

This article details Trailer Nos. 49 – 54 of the Manx Electric Railway on the Isle of Man.

These lightweight trailers were the purchased for the opening to Groudle Glen in 1893 and only No.53 is out of service today. Also of note is that No.51 was restored to original condition in 1989 including detailing of original fleet name on the end dash panels and lightweight roof. At this time the car was numbered 13 as it would originally have been; in 1893 when it arrived there were no power cars numbered past 3, and so the trailers took consecutive numbering sequence, but owing to a subsequent re-think by the operators, trailers were re-numbered commencing after the last power car (33). So it was that the original number 13 was displayed until it reverted to its latter number 51 during management and policy changes in 2001. Additionally, No.52 serves as a flatbed wagon. This trailer was stripped of its seating and roofing each winter for use by permanent way crews, but this practice ceased in 1954 after which time the item has been a dedicating flatbed runner. It survives today and had a distinctive yellow-painted dash panel with standard painted fleet number, based at Laxey Car Sheds.

No.	Builder	Seating	Livery	Seats	Notes
No.49	G.F. Milnes & Co., Ltd.	Crossbench	Maroon & Cream	44	Returned to service in 2019
No.50	G.F. Milnes & Co., Ltd.	Crossbench	Nationalised Green & White	44	Returned to service in 2025
No.51	G.F. Milnes & Co., Ltd.	Crossbench	Maroon & Teak	44	Occasional appearances, though regularly at enthusiast events
No.52	G.F. Milnes & Co., Ltd.	N/A	Yellow & Black	N/A	Used for overhead line maintenance
No.53	G.F. Milnes & Co., Ltd.	Crossbench	Red, White & Teak	44	Stored, Derby Castle Car Shed
No.54	G.F. Milnes & Co., Ltd.	Crossbench	Red & White	44	Returned to service in 2019

== See also ==
- Manx Electric Railway rolling stock

== Sources ==
- Manx Manx Electric Railway Fleetlist (2002) Manx Electric Railway Society
- Island Island Images: Manx Electric Railway Pages (2003) Jon Wornham
- Official Official Tourist Department Page (2009) Isle Of Man Heritage Railways
- Trailers | Manx Electric Railway Online Manx Electric Railway official website
