= Manx Electric Cars 24–27 =

Car Nos. 24 – 27
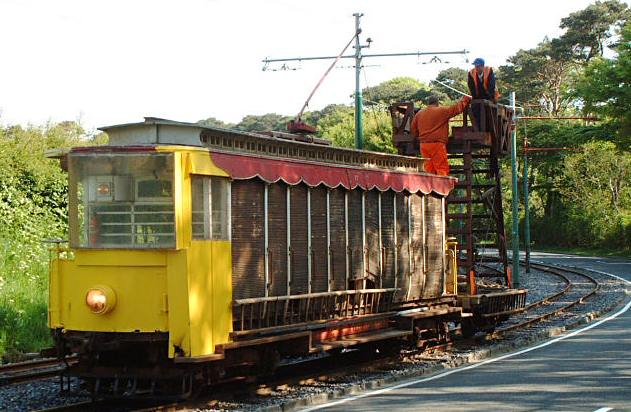
- Car 27
- Manufacturers: G.F. Milnes & Co.
- Built at: Birkenhead
- Constructed: 1898
- Number built: 4
- Number in service: 3 (Stored)
- Number scrapped: 1
- Formation: Open Paddlebox
- Capacity: 56 Passengers (No.27: 36 Passengers)
- Operator: Manx Electric Railway
- Depot: Derby Castle Depôt

Specifications
- Traction system: 4 x SEHC traction motors of 25 hp (19 kW)
- Power output: 100 hp (75 kW)
- Electric system: 550 V DC
- Current collection: Overhead
- Braking system: Air
- Track gauge: 3 ft (914 mm)

This article details Car Nos. 24–27 of the Manx Electric Railway on the Isle of Man.

This was the sixth batch of tramcars delivered. These open cars were purchased from G.F. Milnes & Co., in 1898 and only No.24 has been lost, and this was in the 1930 fire at Laxey. Of those remaining, No.25 was stripped of her trucks and motors in 2003 and these have since been fitted to the "new" dedicated works car, now known as No.34. No.26 and No.27 have both been out of service for many years.

No.	Builder	Seating	Livery	Seats	Notes
No.24	G.F. Milnes & Co., Ltd.	Crossbench	Red, White & Teak	56	Lost, Laxey Shed Fire 1930
No.25	G.F. Milnes & Co., Ltd.	Crossbench	White Undercoat	56	Stored, Laxey Car Shed
No.26	G.F. Milnes & Co., Ltd.	Crossbench	Red & White	56	Stored, Laxey Car Shed
No.27	G.F. Milnes & Co., Ltd.	Crossbench	Red & White with Wasp Stripes	36	Stored, Laxey Car Shed

== See also ==
- Manx Electric Railway rolling stock

== Sources ==
- Manx Manx Electric Railway Fleetlist (2002) Manx Electric Railway Society
- Island Island Images: Manx Electric Railway Pages (2003) Jon Wornham
- Official Official Tourist Department Page (2009) Isle Of Man Heritage Railways
- Tramcars | Manx Electric Railway Online Manx Electric Railway official website
