= Manx Electric Trailers 61–62 =

Trailer Nos. 61 – 62
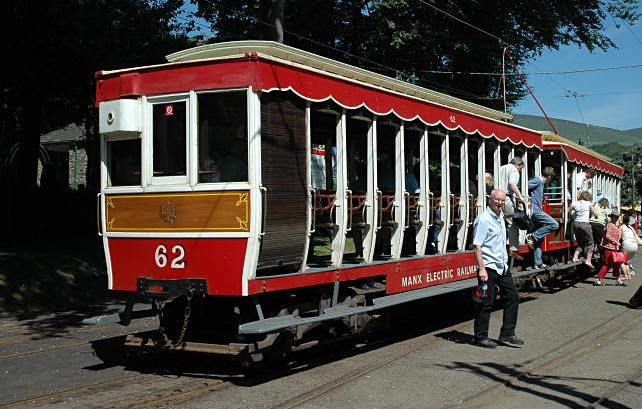
- Trailer No. 62, Laxey Station
- Manufacturers: United Electric Car Company, Ltd.
- Built at: Dick, Kerr & Co. works, Preston
- Constructed: 1906
- Formation: Open Crossbench
- Capacity: 44
- Operator: Isle Of Man Heritage Railways
- Depot: Derby Castle Depôt

Specifications
- UIC classification: 2′2′

This article details Trailer Nos. 61 – 62 of the Manx Electric Railway on the Isle of Man.

These were the final trailers supplied to the tramway, apart from the replacement cars of 1930, these trailers are both in regular use, with No.62 most usually paired with Car No.32. No.62 also currently sports the rare 'Nationalised Green' livery to match Car No.32.

No.	Builder	Seating	Livery	Seats	Notes
No.61	United Electric Car Co., Ltd.	Crossbench	Red, White & Teak	44	Overhauled in 2016/17
No.62	United Electric Car Co., Ltd.	Crossbench	Nationalised Green	44	Livery matches Car No.32

== See also ==
- Manx Electric Railway rolling stock

== Sources ==
- Manx Manx Electric Railway Fleetlist (2002) Manx Electric Railway Society
- Island Island Images: Manx Electric Railway Pages (2003) Jon Wornham
- Official Official Tourist Department Page (2009) Isle Of Man Heritage Railways
- Trailers | Manx Electric Railway Online Manx Electric Railway official website
