= Manx Electric Trailers 44–48 =

Trailer Nos. 44–48
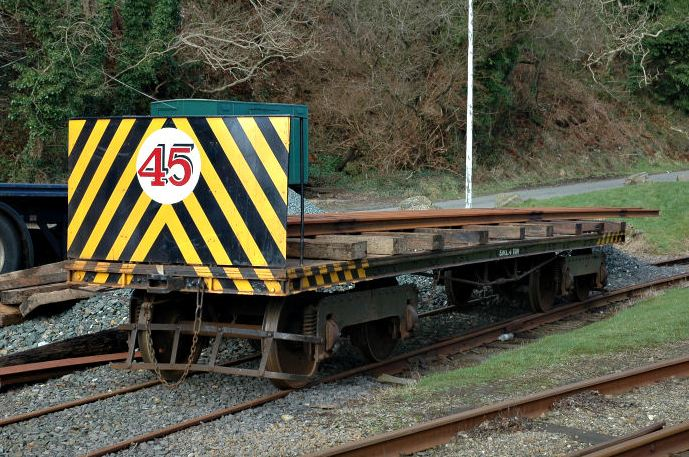
- Manufacturers: G.F. Milnes & Co., Ltd.
- Built at: Cleveland Street Works, Birkenhead
- Constructed: 1899, replacement in 1930
- Number built: 5 originals, 1 replacement
- Number scrapped: 2 (One lost in fire, one scrapped in 2021)
- Formation: Open Crossbench
- Capacity: 44 Passengers
- Operator: Isle Of Man Heritage Railways
- Depot: Derby Castle Depôt

Specifications
- UIC classification: 2′2′

This article details Trailer Nos. 44–48 of the Manx Electric Railway on the Isle of Man.

Supplied by G.F. Milnes & Co., in 1899 each seating 44 passengers, four of five trailers are extant today, however No.45 lost its body during the winter of 2003 and was converted into a flat wagon. The bodywork has however been retained for future use.
No.44 was lost in the Laxey Car Sheds fire of 1930 and was replaced the same year with a new No.44.

No.	Builder	Seating	Livery	Seats	Notes
No.44 (Original)	G.F. Milnes & Co., Ltd.	Crossbench	Red, White & Teak	44	Lost, Laxey Shed Fire 1930
No.44 (Replacement)	English Electric Co.	Crossbench	Red, White & Teak	44	Overhauled in 2009, repainted in 2014/15
No.45	G.F. Milnes & Co., Ltd.	N/A	Yellow & Black	N/A	Scrapped in 2021
No.46	G.F. Milnes & Co., Ltd.	Crossbench	~	44	Undergoing restoration
No.47	G.F. Milnes & Co., Ltd.	Crossbench	Red, White & Teak	44	Returned to service in March 2025
No.48	G.F. Milnes & Co., Ltd.	Crossbench	Red, White & Teak	44	Returned to service in March 2025

== See also ==
- Manx Electric Railway rolling stock

== Sources ==
- Manx Manx Electric Railway Fleetlist (2002) Manx Electric Railway Society
- Island Island Images: Manx Electric Railway Pages (2003) Jon Wornham
- Official Official Tourist Department Page (2009) Isle Of Man Heritage Railways
- Trailers | Manx Electric Railway Online Manx Electric Railway official website
