= Tramcars of the Sheffield Tramway =

List of all electric tramcars of the Sheffield Corporation Tramways 4 ft 8 1/2 in (1,435 mm) (standard gauge). The system opened on 5 September 1899, and closed on 8 October 1960.

== Cars built between 1899 and 1926 ==
Car numbers	Type (as built)	Year built	Builder	Seats lower/upper decks	Truck	Motors	Controllers	Illustration
1–25	Open top	1899	Milnes	22/29	Peckham Cantilever	BTH GE52 2x25hp	BTH B13	
26–38	Open top	1900	Milnes	22/29	Peckham cantilever	BTH GE52 2x25hp	BTH B13	
39–50	Single deck	1899	Milnes	28	Peckham cantilever	BTH GE52 2x25hp	BTH B6	
51–52	Single deck	1899	Milnes	28	Peckham cantilever	BTH GE52 2x25hp	BTH B13	
53–58	Single deck	1900	ER&TCW	28	Brill 21E	BTH GE58 2x35hp	BTH B13	
59–73	Open top	1900	ER&TCW	22/29	Peckham cantilever	BTH GE52 2x25hp	BTH13	
74–88	Open top	1900	ER&TCW	22/29	Brill 21E	BTH GE52 2x25hp	BTH13	
88–103	Single deck	1900	Brush Electrical Engineering Company	28	Brill 21E	BTH GE58 2x35hp	BTH13	
104–123	Open top	1900–01	Brush	22/29	Brill 21E	BTH GE52 2x25hp	BTH13	
124–129	Single deck	1901	SCT	28	Brill 23E	GTH GE58 2x35hp	BTH B13	
130	Water car	1901	SCT	0	Brill 21E	GTH GE58 2x35hp	BTH B13	
131–155	Open top	1901	Milnes	22/29	Brill 21E	BTH GE58 2x35hp	BTH13	
156–165	single deck	1902	Cravens	28	Brill 21E	BTH GE52 2x35hp	BTH13	
166	Works car	1874 (1902)	Starbuck Car and Wagon Company		Brill 21E	BTH GE58 2x35hp	BTH13	
167–186	Open top	1902	Cravens	22/29	Brill 21E	BTH GE58 2x35hp	BTH13	
187–192	Single deck	1903	Milnes	28	Milnes	BTH GE58 2x35hp	BTH13	
193–198	Open top	1903	SCT	22/29	Milnes	BTH GE58 2x35hp	BTH13	
199	Stores car	1877 (1903)	unknown		Brill 21E	BTH GE58 2x35hp	BTH	
200–211	Single deck	1903	SCT	28	Brill 21E	BTH GE52 2x35hp	BTH13	
212	Water car	1904	SCT		Milnes	BTH GE58 2x35hp	BTH13	
213–218	Open top	1904	SCT	22/29	Milnes	BTH GE58 2x35hp	BTH	
219–243	Open top	1904	Brush	22/29	Brush A	BTH GE58 2x35hp	BTH	
244–245	Open top	1897 (1904)	Milnes	22/29	Brush A	BTH GE58 2x35hp	BTH	
246–257	Short top cover	1905	SCT	22/30	Mills/Brush AA	BTH GE58 2x35hp	BTH13	
258–272	Balcony	1907	UEC	22/36	M&G Radial	BTH GE58 2x35hp	BTH13	
273–280	Snow-ploughs	1906	Milnes		Peckham Cantilever	BTH GE58 2x25hp	BTH13	
281–295	Balcony	1912	SCT	22–36	Peckham	BTH RGE20 2x40hp	BTH18	
296–345	Balcony	1913	Brush	22/36	Peckham P22	BTH RGE20 2x40hp	BTH18	
346–355	Balcony	1913	SCT	22/36	Peckham P22	BTH RGE20 2x40hp	BTH18	
367–369	Enclosed	1918–21	SCT	28/48	Peckham P22	BTH RGE203 2x40hp	BTH	
376–400	Enclosed	1921–22	Brush	28/48	Peckham P22	BTH RGE203 2x40hp	BTH	
401–450	Enclosed	1919–20	SCT	28/48	Peckham P22	BTH RGE203 2x40hp	BTH	
451–500	Enclosed	1926–27	Cravens	28/40	Peckham P22	Metropolitan-Vickers 102D 2x50hp	BTH OK1B	

== Cars built between 1927 and 1952 ==
Car numbers	Type (as built)	Year built	Builder	Seats	Truck	Motors	Controllers	Illustration
1	Enclosed	1927	Cravens	24/37	Peckham P22	MV 102 2x50hp	BTH B510	
2–35	Enclosed	1928–30	SCT	24/37	Peckham P22	MV 102 2x50hp	BTH B510	
36–60	Enclosed	1924–25	Brush	Brush	Peckham P22	BTH 503 2x40hp	BTH B510	
61–130	Enclosed	1930–33	SCT	24/37	Peckham P22	MV 102DR 2x50hp	BTH B510	
131–155	Enclosed	1929–30	Hill	24/37	Peckham P22	MV 102 2x50hp	BTH B510	
156–230	Enclosed	1933–35	SCT	24/37	Peckham P22	MV 102DR 2x50hp	BTH B510	
231–242	Enclosed	1936	SCT	24/37	Peckham P22	MV 102DR 2x50hp	BTH B510	
243–248	Enclosed	1936	SCT	24/37	Peckham P22	WT 286 or MV 116DR 2x50hp	BTH B510	
249–303	Enclosed	1936–39	SCT	24/37	Peckham P22	MV 102DR 2x50hp	BTH B510	
336–350	Enclosed	1907	UEC	22/36	Peckham P22	various 2x40hp	BTH B510	
352–365	Snow-ploughs	various	various		Brill 21E	GEC 58 2x35hp	various	
311–324	Enclosed	1901 (1941)	Hurst Nelson	24/36	Brill 21E	BTH GE58 2x35hp	BTH B3	
325–334	Enclosed	1920–21 (1943)	English Electric	19/40	Brill 21E	EE DK 31A 2x50hp	DK DB1	
501	Jubilee	1946	SCT	26/36	M&T588	MV 102DR3 2x65hp	BTH B510	
502–536	Jubilee	1950–52	Roberts	26/36	M&T588	MV 102DR3 2x65hp	BTH B510	
