= Manx Electric Trailer 59 =

Trailer No. 59 "Royal Saloon"
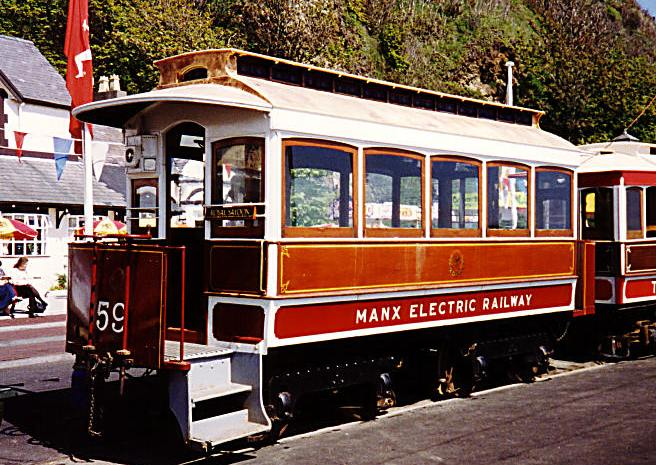
- Trailer No. 59, Derby Castle Terminus
- Manufacturer: G.F. Milnes & Co., Ltd.
- Built at: Cleveland Street Works, Birkenhead
- Constructed: 1895
- Formation: Enclosed 'Special Saloon'
- Capacity: 18
- Operator: Isle Of Man Heritage Railways
- Depot: Derby Castle Depôt

This article details Trailer No. 59 of the Manx Electric Railway on the Isle of Man.

This is the smallest item of passenger stock on the railway, and referred to as the Royal Saloon or sometimes "doll's house" owing to its diminutive size. It became known as the royal saloon/trailer after a visit to Royal Ramsey (so dubbed from the visit) by Queen Victoria and has since carried royalty on a few occasions. It remains rarely used in traffic and stored at Derby Castle Depôt after a number of years on display at the visitors' centre at the terminus.

No.	Builder	Seating	Livery	Seats	Notes
No.59	G.F. Milnes & Co., Ltd.	Flip-Over Seats	Blue & Ivory	18	In regular use

== See also ==
- Manx Electric Railway rolling stock

== Sources ==
- Manx Manx Electric Railway Fleetlist (2002) Manx Electric Railway Society
- Island Island Images: Manx Electric Railway Pages (2003) Jon Wornham
- Official Official Tourist Department Page (2009) Isle Of Man Heritage Railways
- Trailers | Manx Electric Railway Online Manx Electric Railway official website
