= Manx Electric Cars 28–31 =

Group of tramcars

Car Nos. 28 – 31
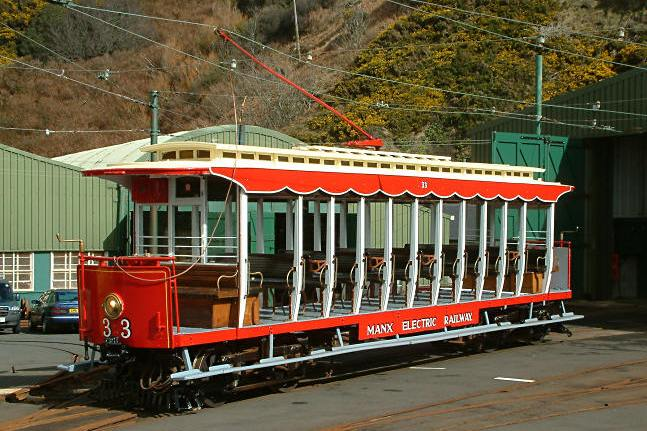
- Manx Electric Railway, Car No. 33
- Manufacturers: Electric Railway & Tramway Carriage Co. Ltd
- Built at: E.R.T.C. Co., Ltd. works, Preston, Lancashire
- Constructed: 1904
- Number built: 4
- Number in service: 0
- Formation: Open Crossbench
- Capacity: 56 Passengers
- Operator: Isle Of Man Heritage Railways
- Depot: Derby Castle Depôt

Specifications
- Traction system: 4 x GEC60 traction motors of 27 hp (20 kW)
- Power output: 108 hp (81 kW)
- Electric system: 550 V DC
- Current collection: Overhead
- Braking system: Air
- Track gauge: 3 ft (914 mm)

Car Nos. 28–31 are a group of tramcars for the Manx Electric Railway on the Isle of Man.

The seventh and penultimate batch of motorcars to arrive are all extant today, though all are out of service. Nos. 28, 30 and 31 are all being stored at Laxey Car Shed, being out of service. No.29 is in store at Derby Castle Car Sheds, under restoration.

No.	Builder	Seating	Livery	Seats	Notes
No.28	E.R.T.C. Co., Ltd.	Crossbench	Red & White	56	Stored, Laxey Car Shed
No.29	E.R.T.C. Co., Ltd.	Crossbench	Red & White	56	Undergoing restoration
No.30	E.R.T.C. Co., Ltd.	Crossbench	Red & White	56	Stored, Laxey Car Shed
No.31	E.R.T.C. Co., Ltd.	Crossbench	Red & White	56	Stored, Laxey Car Shed

== See also ==
- Manx Electric Railway rolling stock

== Sources ==
- Manx Manx Electric Railway Fleetlist (2002) Manx Electric Railway Society
- Island Island Images: Manx Electric Railway Pages (2003) Jon Wornham
- Official Official Tourist Department Page (2009) Isle Of Man Heritage Railways
- Tramcars | Manx Electric Railway Online Manx Electric Railway official website
