= Manx Electric Locomotive 23 =

No. 23 Dr. R.P. Hendry
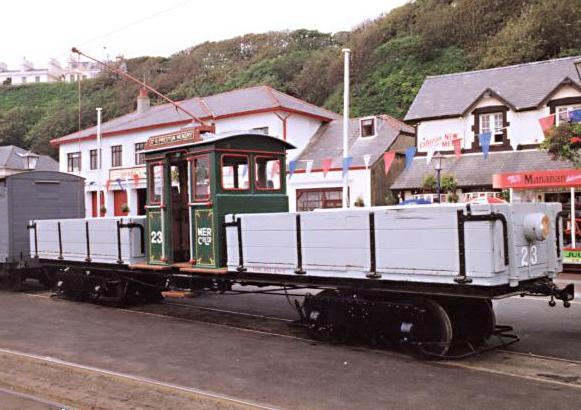
- Manufacturer: I.o.M.T. & E.P. Co.
- Built at: Derby Castle Depôt
- Constructed: 1900
- Number built: 1
- Formation: Loco (With Wagons)
- Capacity: 24
- Operator: Manx Electric Railway
- Depot: Derby Castle Depôt

Specifications
- Electric system: 550 V DC
- Current collection: Overhead
- Braking system: Hand Only
- Track gauge: 3 ft (914 mm)

Dr. R.P. Hendry (or "Locomotive 23") was the only locomotive operated by the Manx Electric Railway (MER) on the Isle of Man. It has since been joined by loco no 34, Maria.

Constructed by the railway company in 1900, and later rebuilt with wagon bodies on either side, the locomotive is now privately owned. It was restored in 1983 and operated as part of the centenary and subsequent celebrations, painted in the "Isle of Man Tramways & Electric Power Co. Ltd." livery. In 1992 the vehicle was named "Dr R. Preston Hendry" in recognition of the man who did so much to save the railways of the island at a difficult time.

The locomotive is currently stored in the Laxey Car Shed, placed on wooden blocks.
In June 2025 the ownership of No.23 was gifted to the Great Laxey Mines Railway.

No.	Builder	Seating	Livery	Seats	Notes
No.23	I.o.M.T. & E.P. Co.	Chairs & Benches	Green & Freight Grey	24	Stored in Laxey Car Shed

== See also ==
- Manx Electric Railway Rolling Stock

== Sources ==
- Manx Manx Electric Railway Fleetlist (2002) Manx Electric Railway Society
- Island Island Images: Manx Electric Railway Pages (2003) Jon Wornham
- Official Official Tourist Department Page (2009) Isle Of Man Heritage Railways
