= Manx Electric Cars 4–9 =

Car Nos. 4 – 9
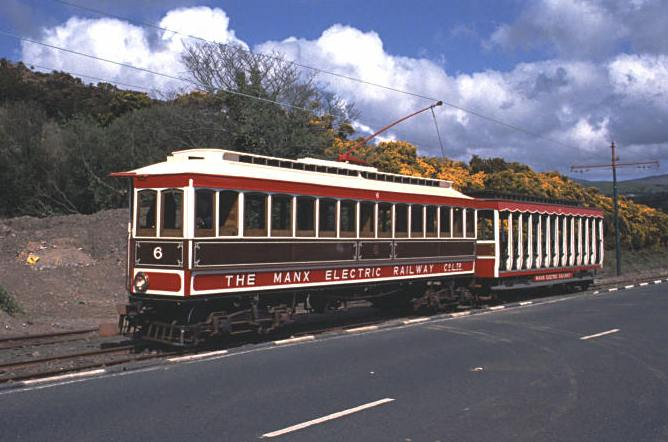
- Car No. 6, Howstrake Head
- Manufacturers: G.F. Milnes & Co., Birkenhead
- Constructed: 1894
- Number built: 6
- Formation: Tunnel Car
- Capacity: 36 (except Car 5: 32)
- Operator: Isle Of Man Heritage Railways
- Depot: Derby Castle Depôt

Specifications
- Traction system: Four SEHC traction motors of 25 hp (19 kW)
- Power output: 100 hp (75 kW)
- Electric system: 550 V DC
- Current collection: Overhead
- Braking system: Air
- Track gauge: 3 ft (914 mm)

This article details Car Nos. 4–9 of the Manx Electric Railway on the Isle of Man.

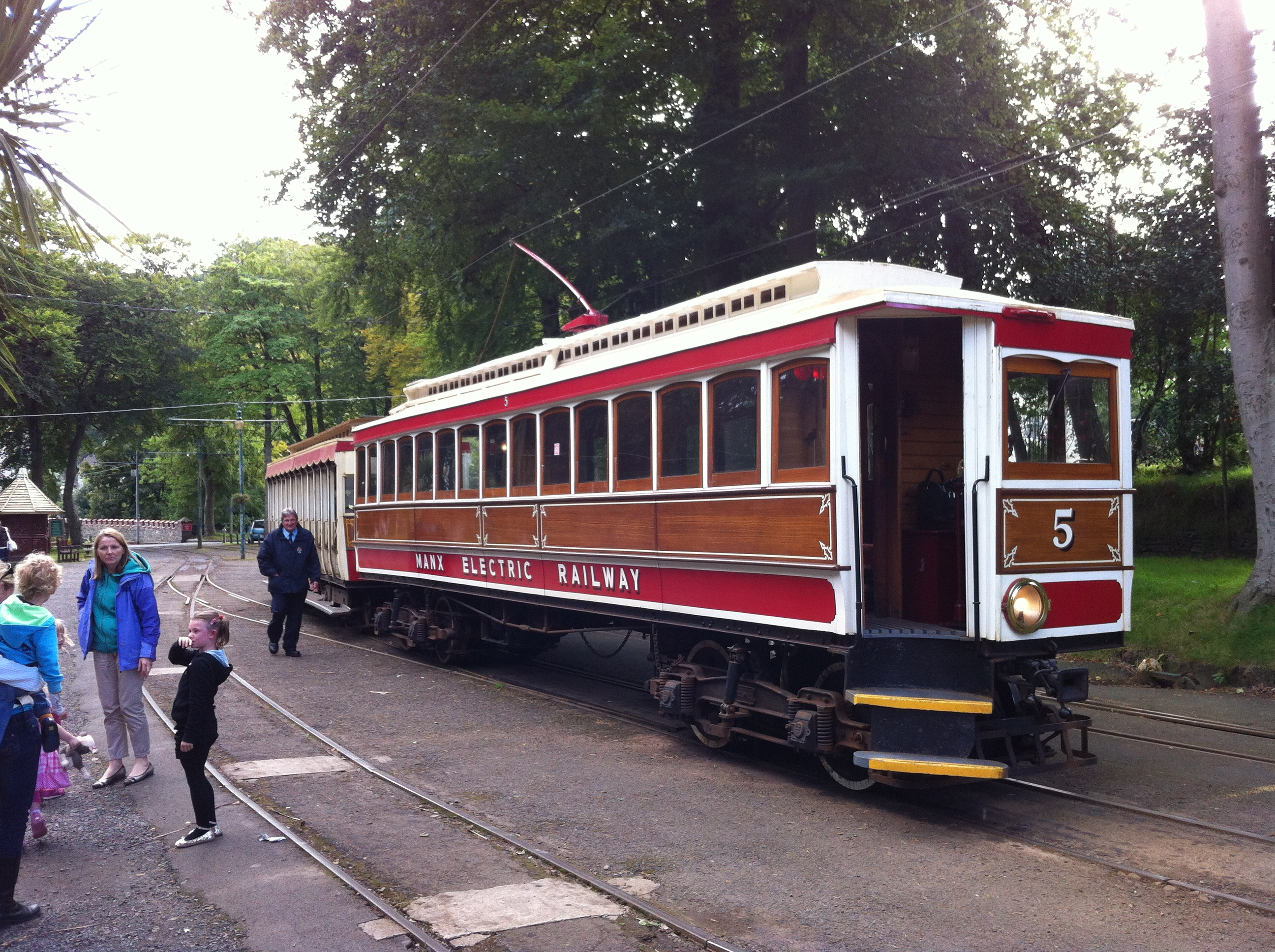
Tunnel Car No.5 at Laxey Station hauling an open trailer

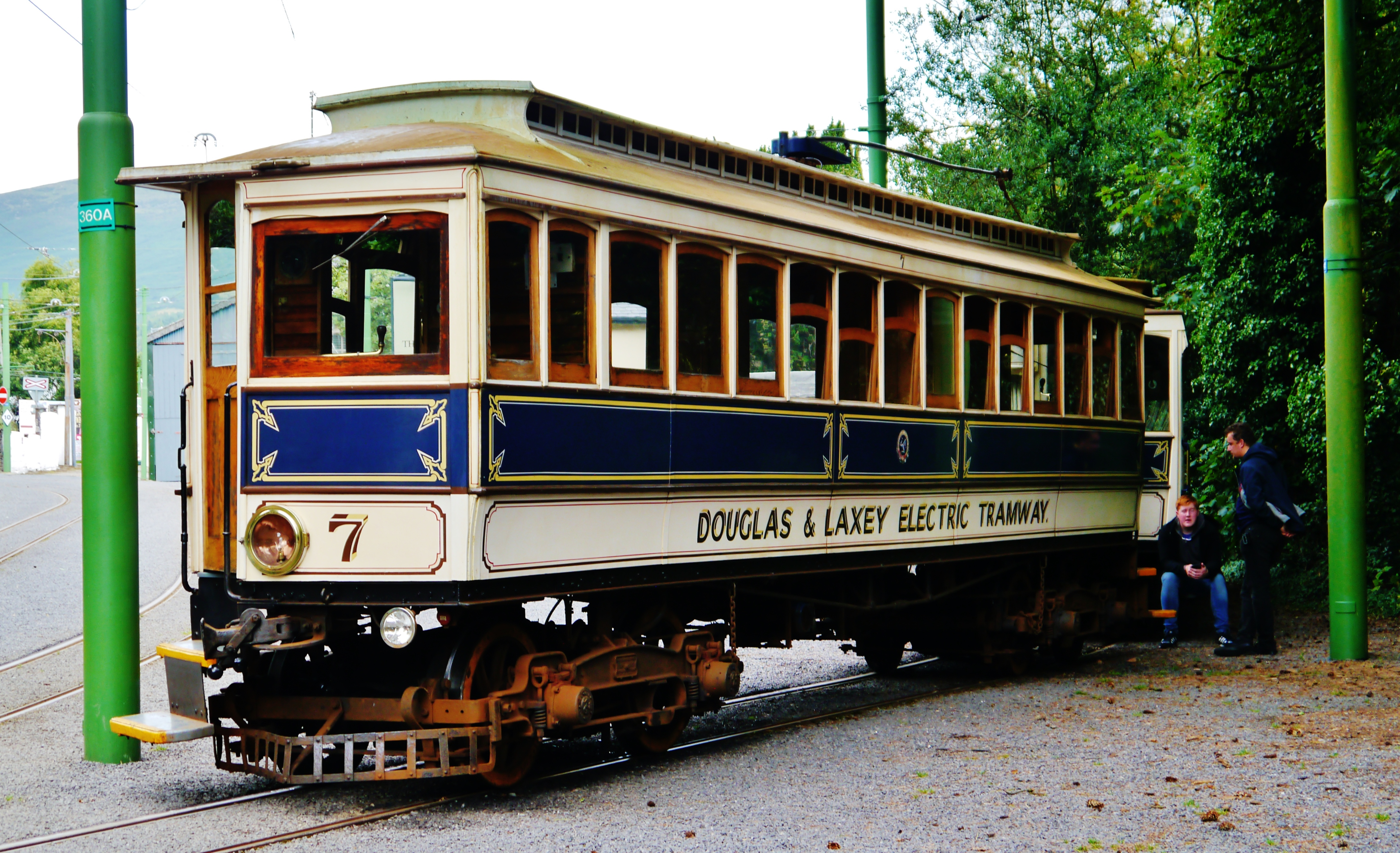
Tunnel Car No.7 on the siding at Laxey Station

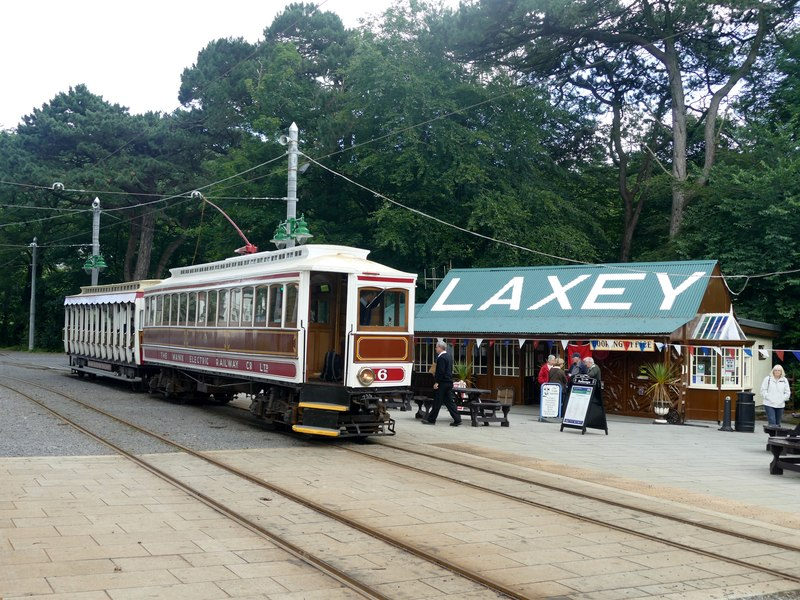
Tunnel Car No.6 at Laxey Station in its present form.

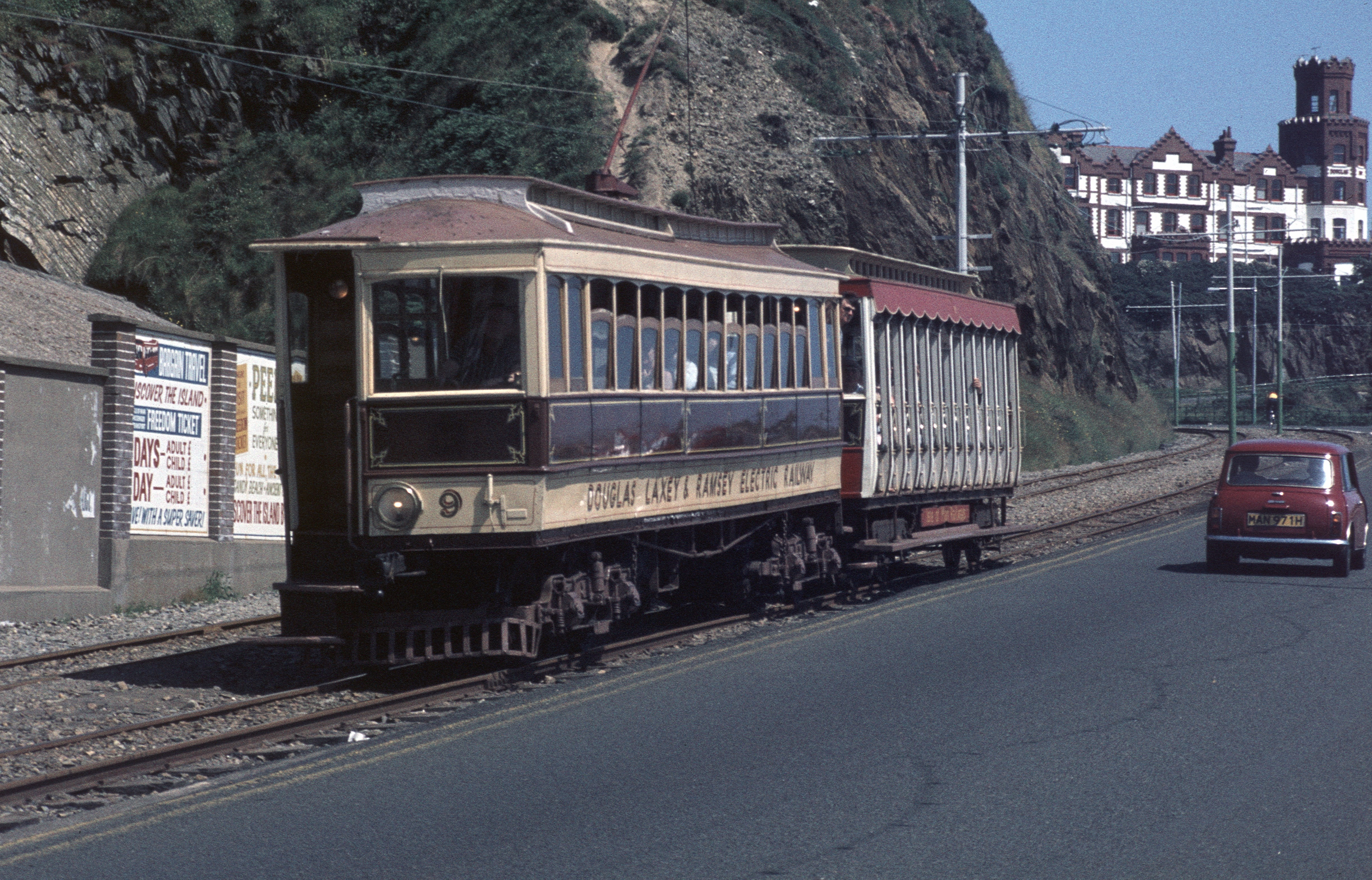
Tunnel Car No.9 approaching Derby Castle passing the depot

== Details ==
This was the second batch of cars delivered to the railway for its opening as far as Laxey Station in 1894. Referred to as "tunnel cars" because their seating was originally parallel to the sides with just one large passenger saloon, typical of early trams, as opposed to the more usual reversible seating common in tramcar layout.

== Losses ==
All remaining cars are still in regular use today except for No.4 and No.8, both of which were destroyed by the Laxey Car Shed fire in 1930 together with several other items of stock; at times remaining class members have been temporarily re-numbered for photographic purposes during events to mimic these lost cars.

== Illuminated Car ==
Giving rise to controversy among the M.E.R. faithful No.9 was selected to become the tramway's first illuminated car and operated as such in this guise until its 2023/4 repaint in a variety of styles; prior to this it was painted in the brown and cream scheme as it carried when delivered to the line, from 1979 for the centenary of electric traction celebrations and Millennium of Tynwald. Initially individual blubs, the illuminations were later changed to rope lights, and finally to LED fittings before they were eventually removed.

== Rebuild ==
While cars 5 and 6 have remained in regular traffic, Car No. 7 was relegated to permanent way duties for a number of years and was in very poor condition. In early 2010, this car was removed from the system and extensively rebuilt by an on-island contractor, returning in a deep blue colour scheme, believed to have been that originally carried by this class of car upon delivery. The refit also saw the removal of longitudinal bench seating and its replacement with reversible tramway-type seating

== Variants ==
Some cars were later modified; Nos. 5 and 7 have flip-over seating fitted, reducing capacity by 4 compared to the other cars; No.6 had the original split-screen refitted to the driver's cabs following refurbishment in 1989, but this was said to impede visibility and removed again in 1994. No.6 carried a unique lettering detail on its sides from 1986 bearing the legend "Isle of Man Passenger Transport Board", this was removed during a later repaint.

No.	Builder	Seating	Livery	Seats	Notes
No.4	G.F. Milnes & Co., Ltd.	Longitudinal Benches	Red, White & Teak	36	Lost, Laxey Shed Fire 1930
No.5	G.F. Milnes & Co., Ltd.	Flip-Over Seats	Red, White & Teak	32	Early 1970s Livery
No.6	G.F. Milnes & Co., Ltd.	Longitudinal Benches	~	36	Undergoing bodywork overhaul
No.7	G.F. Milnes & Co., Ltd.	Flip-Over Seats	Blue, White & Teak	32	"Original" Livery Scheme
No.8	G.F. Milnes & Co., Ltd.	Longitudinal Benches	Red, White & Teak	36	Lost, Laxey Shed Fire 1930
No.9	G.F. Milnes & Co., Ltd.	Transverse Benches	Red, White & Teak	36	Repainted 2023/4

== See also ==
- Manx Electric Railway rolling stock

== Sources ==
- Manx Manx Electric Railway Fleetlist (2002) Manx Electric Railway Society
- Island Island Images: Manx Electric Railway Pages (2003) Jon Wornham
- Official Official Tourist Department Page (2009) Isle Of Man Heritage Railways
- Tramcars | Manx Electric Railway Online Manx Electric Railway official website
