= Manx Electric Cars 1–3 =

Car Nos. 1 – 3
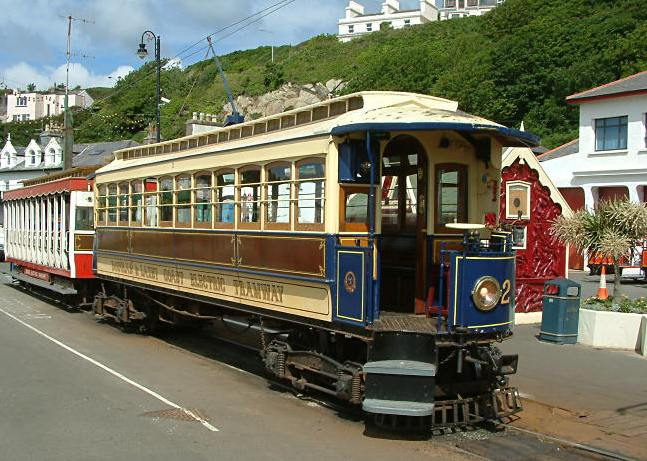
- Car No.2, Derby Castle Terminus
- Manufacturers: G.F. Milnes & Co.
- Built at: Birkenhead
- Constructed: 1893
- Number built: 3
- Number in service: 2
- Number scrapped: 1 (lost in fire)
- Formation: Unvestibuled Saloon
- Capacity: 34
- Operator: Isle Of Man Heritage Railways
- Depot: Derby Castle Depôt

Specifications
- Traction system: Four SEHC traction motors of 25 hp (19 kW)
- Power output: 100 hp (75 kW)
- Electric system: 550 V DC
- Current collection: Overhead
- Braking system: Air
- Track gauge: 3 ft (914 mm)

This article details Car Nos. 1–3 of the Manx Electric Railway on the Isle of Man.

These tramcars were the original trio of tramcars supplied for the opening in 1893. The two remaining cars hold a joint entry in the Guinness book of records as the oldest fully operational tramcars in the world that still operate on their original running lines. No. 3 was destroyed by fire at Laxey Car Sheds in 1930 but the other two remain in service having survived the austerity years of the line as works cars when they had been relegated to permanent way hacks for many years. The historical precedence of these vehicles was however acknowledged and in 1979, when the island celebrated the millennium of its Tynwald parliament, they were restored to original condition, proving the stars of the show at the line's centenary celebrations. Subsequently, car 2 was partly repainted blue (with some historical precedent as it is believed cars may have originally been deep blue but lack of colour photography from the time cannot clarify this) but both cars are now in a variation of the 1930s "house" style and remain in service.

No.	Builder	Seating	Livery	Seats	Notes
No.1	G.F. Milnes & Co., Ltd.	Longitudinal Benches	Maroon & Ivory	34	Original Colourscheme
No.2	G.F. Milnes & Co., Ltd.	Longitudinal Benches	Maroon & Ivory	34	Original Colourscheme
No.3	G.F. Milnes & Co., Ltd.	Longitudinal Benches	Red, White & Teak	34	Lost, Laxey Shed Fire 1930

== See also ==
- Manx Electric Railway rolling stock

== Sources ==
- Manx Manx Electric Railway Fleetlist (2002) Manx Electric Railway Society
- Island Island Images: Manx Electric Railway Pages (2003) Jon Wornham
- Official Official Tourist Department Page (2009) Isle Of Man Heritage Railways
- Tramcars | Manx Electric Railway Online Manx Electric Railway official website
