= Manx Electric Trailers 55–56 =

Trailer Nos. 55 – 56
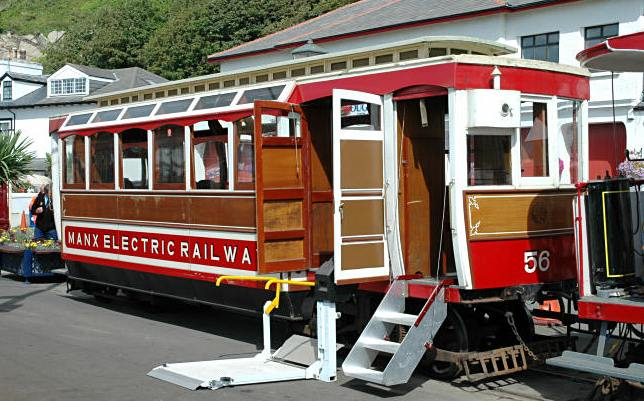
- Trailer No. 56, Derby Castle Terminus
- Manufacturer: Electric Railway & Tramway Carriage Co., Ltd.
- Built at: Dick, Kerr & Co. works, Preston, Lancashire
- Constructed: 1904
- Number built: 2
- Number in service: 1
- Formation: Open Crossbench and Multi-Saloon respectively
- Capacity: 44 (No.55) and 12 (No.56, varies depending on wheelchair users)
- Operator: Isle Of Man Heritage Railways
- Depot: Derby Castle Depôt

Trailer Nos. 55 – 56 are trailers of the Manx Electric Railway on the Isle of Man.

These two trailers have provided part of the mainline running fleet for many years and rarely exited service, except for routine maintenance. However, in 1999 trailer 56 was removed from service and has since been converted into the line's only disabled access saloon featuring removable swivel seating, hydraulic wheelchair ramps and accommodation for carers; at this time the car was also fitted with a public address system for use with winter saloon No.22 for commentary guided trips of the line. Although bearing little resemblance to its original configuration the trailer was painted into traditional "house" colours of red and cream and sees limited service on the line subject to demand. Prior to is conversion there was no provision for disabled passengers on the railway.

No.	Builder	Seating	Livery	Seats	Notes
No.55	E.R.T.C. Co., Ltd.	Crossbench	Red, White & Teak	44	Stored, Derby Castle Bottom Shed
No.56	E.R.T.C. Co., Ltd.	Adjustable Chairs & Longitudinal Benches	Red, White & Teak	12 Seated, Varying With Wheelchair Passengers	Disabled access trailer

== See also ==
- Manx Electric Railway rolling stock

== Sources ==
- Manx Manx Electric Railway Fleetlist (2002) Manx Electric Railway Society
- Island Island Images: Manx Electric Railway Pages (2003) Jon Wornham
- Official Official Tourist Department Page (2009) Isle Of Man Heritage Railways
- Trailers | Manx Electric Railway Online Manx Electric Railway official website
