= Manx Electric Trailers 57–58 =

Trailer Nos. 57 – 58
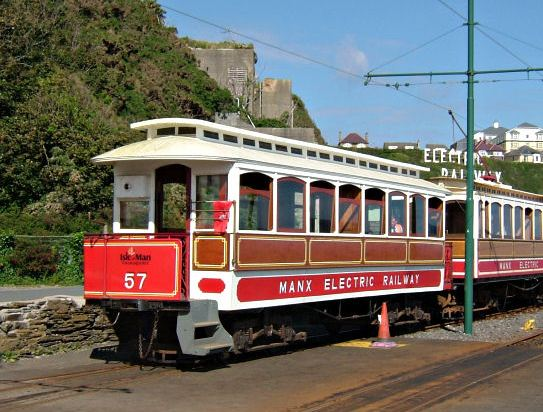
- Trailer 57, Derby Castle Terminus
- Manufacturer: Electric Railway & Tramway Carriage Co., Ltd.
- Built at: Dick Kerr Works, Preston
- Constructed: 1904
- Formation: Closed Saloons
- Capacity: 32
- Operator: Isle Of Man Heritage Railways
- Depot: Derby Castle Depôt

Trailer Nos. 57 – 58 of the Manx Electric Railway on the Isle of Man are a pair of trailers.

These trailers are the line's only enclosed winter saloons, of similar design to their motorcar counterparts, they have received little use with the open crossbench trailers usually favoured. However, when the line celebrated its centenary in 1993 both these trailers were used in conjunction with a "steam on electric" series of events when Isle of Man Railway locomotive No.4 Loch of 1874 carried passengers between Laxey Station and Dhoon Quarry Halt using these two cars. Since their use with these services one also carried passengers from Bungalow Station to the Snaefell Summit Station on the mountain railway behind Manx Northern Railway locomotive No.4 Caledonia in 1995 as part of the International Railway Festival in celebration of the centenary of the Snaefell Mountain Railway. Again in 1998 both cars were in use behind Isle of Man Railway locomotive No.1 Sutherland of 1873 between Laxey Station and Fairy Cottage Halt as part of the Steam 125 event. Since these times the trailers have been little used, usually for enthusiasts' excursions. Both cars currently carry a variation of the line's traditional "house" style livery but with bright red dash panels and "Isle Of Man Transport" transfers, unfitting of their historical nature.

No.	Builder	Seating	Livery	Seats	Notes
No.57	United Electric Car Co., Ltd.	Flip-Over Seats	Red, White & Teak	32	Repainted in 2019
No.58	United Electric Car Co., Ltd.	Flip-Over Seats	Red, White & Teak	32	Full overhaul & repair in 2015, returned to traffic in 2016

== See also ==
- Manx Electric Railway rolling stock

== Sources ==
- Manx Manx Electric Railway Fleetlist (2002) Manx Electric Railway Society
- Island Island Images: Manx Electric Railway Pages (2003) Jon Wornham
- Official Official Tourist Department Page (2009) Isle Of Man Heritage Railways
- Trailers | Manx Electric Railway Online Manx Electric Railway official website
