= Manx Electric Cars 32–33 =

Group of tramcars

Car Nos. 32 – 33
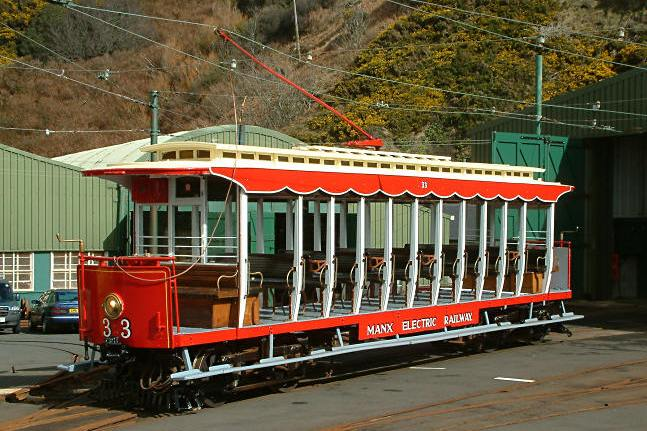
- Manufacturer: United Electric Car Company
- Built at: United Electric Car Co., Ltd., Preston, Lancashire
- Constructed: 1906
- Number built: 2
- Number in service: 1
- Formation: Open Crossbench
- Capacity: 56 Passengers
- Operator: Isle Of Man Heritage Railways
- Depot: Derby Castle Depôt

Specifications
- Traction system: 4 x GEC60 traction motors of 27.5 hp (21 kW)
- Power output: 108 hp (81 kW)
- Electric system: 550 V DC
- Current collection: Overhead
- Braking system: Air
- Track gauge: 3 ft (914 mm)

Car Nos. 32–33 are a group of tramcars for the Manx Electric Railway on the Isle of Man.

The eighth and final batch of motorcars to arrive are all extant today. Nos. 32 and 33 were designed to haul two trailers when built but this was never a day-to-day feature of operation, although they have on occasion hauled two trailers in conjunction with enthusiasts events. No.32 is still in regular service. No.33, however, is currently undergoing overhaul.

No.	Builder	Seating	Livery	Seats	Notes
No.32	United Electric Car Co., Ltd.	Crossbench	Nationalised Green	56	Part of general running fleet
No.33	United Electric Car Co., Ltd.	Crossbench	Maroon & White	56	Undergoing overhaul

== See also ==
- Manx Electric Railway rolling stock

== Sources ==
- Manx Manx Electric Railway Fleetlist (2002) Manx Electric Railway Society
- Island Island Images: Manx Electric Railway Pages (2003) Jon Wornham
- Official Official Tourist Department Page (2009) Isle Of Man Heritage Railways
- Tramcars | Manx Electric Railway Online Manx Electric Railway official website
