= Manx Electric Cars 10–13 =

Car Nos. 10 – 13
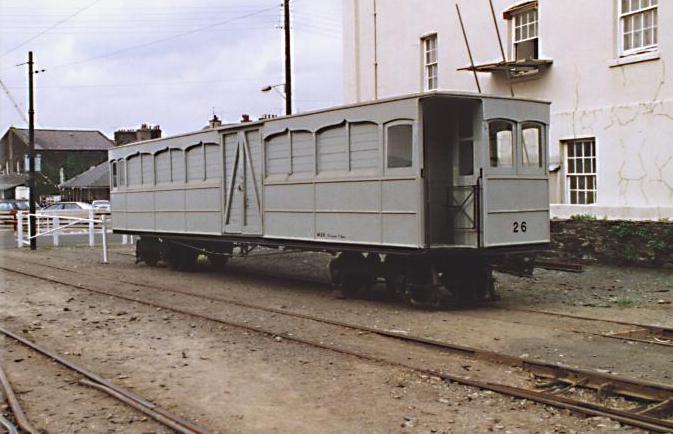
- Manufacturers: G.F. Milnes & Co.
- Built at: Birkenhead
- Constructed: 1895
- Number built: 4
- Number preserved: 1 (Static exhibit)
- Number scrapped: 3
- Formation: Vestibuled Saloon
- Fleet numbers: 10–13
- Capacity: 48 (No.10)
- Operator: Manx Electric Railway
- Depot: Derby Castle Depôt

Specifications
- Traction system: Four SEHC traction motors of 25 hp (19 kW)
- Power output: 100 hp (75 kW)
- Electric system: 550 V DC
- Current collection: Overhead
- Track gauge: 3 ft (914 mm)

This article details Car Nos. 10–13 of the Manx Electric Railway on the Isle of Man.

This was the third batch of motorcars delivered to the railway in 1895 at the same time as the cars for the new Snaefell Mountain Railway were delivery. They were constructed to a very similar design to those provided for the mountain line. These vehicles were not a success owing to their initially open side with no glazed windows and were subsequently converted for use as cattle cars, one of which survives today, numbered 26 (in sequence with good stock rather than power cars, as power car 26 is still extant). It is currently operational for use on special trips during the Transport Festival. It was, for several years, part of a display at Ramsey Plaza station as part of a small museum. It is the sole survivor of the class, the remaining ones were also converted to cattle cars but decreased usage of the railway for such use meant that they were surplus to requirements and only one was retained to ensure that one of each type is retained.

No.	Builder	Seating	Livery	Seats	Notes
No.10	G.F. Milnes & Co., Ltd.	Transverse Reversible Seats	Freight Grey	48	Used for special trips
No.11	G.F. Milnes & Co., Ltd.	~	Blue, Teak & Grey	~	Scrapped in 1926
No.12	G.F. Milnes & Co., Ltd.	~	Blue, Teak & Grey	~	Scrapped in 1927
No.13	G.F. Milnes & Co., Ltd.	~	Freight Grey	~	Scrapped in 1957

== See also ==
- Manx Electric Railway rolling stock

== Sources ==
- Manx Manx Electric Railway Fleetlist (2002) Manx Electric Railway Society
- Island Island Images: Manx Electric Railway Pages (2003) Jon Wornham
- Official Official Tourist Department Page (2009) Isle Of Man Heritage Railways
- Tramcars | Manx Electric Railway Online Manx Electric Railway official website
