= Manx Electric Cars 14–18 =

Car Nos. 14 – 18
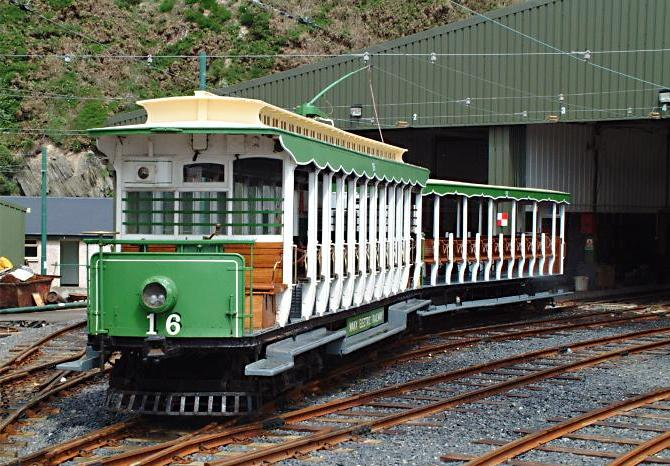
- Manufacturers: G.F. Milnes & Co.
- Built at: Birkenhead
- Constructed: 1898
- Number built: 5
- Number in service: 2
- Formation: Open Crossbench
- Capacity: 56 Passengers
- Operator: Manx Electric Railway
- Depot: Derby Castle Depôt

Specifications
- Traction system: Four ECC traction motors of 20 hp (15 kW)
- Power output: 80 hp (60 kW)
- Electric system: 550 V DC
- Current collection: Overhead
- Track gauge: 3 ft (914 mm)

This article details Car Nos. 14–18 of the Manx Electric Railway on the Isle of Man.

The fourth batch of power cars delivered to the railway in 1898 were also the first open toastracks delivered. Five of these crossbench 56-seat cars were supplied by G.F. Milnes & Co., in 1898 and all of these survive today, with only two in semi-regular service, being cars 14, which carries a maroon/white livery and car 16 which retains traditional company livery. The rest of the class remain in various states of disrepair having not been used for a number of years, stored at the Derby Castle Car Sheds, their long-term futures uncertain, No. 15 being partly stripped, No. 17 being heavily stripped and No. 18 missing the required 'Ratchet'-only car maintenance.

No.	Builder	Seating	Livery	Seats	Notes
No.14	G.F. Milnes & Co., Ltd.	Crossbench	Maroon & White	56	Used for special events
No.15	G.F. Milnes & Co., Ltd.	Crossbench	Red & White	56	Stored, partly stripped
No.16	G.F. Milnes & Co., Ltd.	Crossbench	Red & White	56	Used in summer and special events
No.17	G.F. Milnes & Co., Ltd.	Crossbench	Red & White	56	Stored, heavily stripped
No.18	G.F. Milnes & Co., Ltd.	Crossbench	Red & White	56	Stored, unmaintained

== See also ==
- Manx Electric Railway rolling stock

== Sources ==
- Manx Manx Electric Railway Fleetlist (2002) Manx Electric Railway Society
- Island Island Images: Manx Electric Railway Pages (2003) Jon Wornham
- Official Official Tourist Department Page (2009) Isle Of Man Heritage Railways
