= Manx Electric Cars 19–22 =

Car Nos. 19 – 22
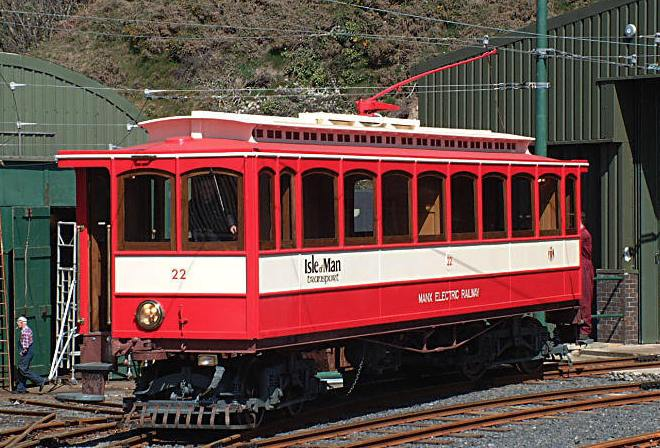
- Manufacturer: G.F. Milnes & Co.
- Built at: Birkenhead
- Constructed: 1899
- Number built: 4
- Number in service: 4
- Formation: Closed Saloon
- Capacity: 48
- Operator: Manx Electric Railway
- Depot: Derby Castle Depôt
- Line served: Manx Electric Railway

Specifications
- Traction system: Four SEHC traction motors of 25 hp (19 kW)
- Power output: 100 hp (75 kW)
- Electric system: 550 V DC
- Current collection: Overhead
- Braking system: Air
- Track gauge: 3 ft (914 mm)

This article details Car Nos. 19–22 of the Manx Electric Railway on the Isle of Man.

These saloon cars, forming the fifth batch of power cars, were supplied and delivered in 1899 for the completion of the final section of the line between Laxey Station and Ramsey Plaza. Three of the four remain in service presently as No.20 is undergoing overhaul. The four vestibuled cars, known as the Winter Saloons, are the backbone of the fleet of the Manx Electric Railway on the Isle of Man; they are still in regular service but No.22 was completely rebuilt following a fire at Derby Castle Depôt in 1992 and is now widely considered to be a replica car. They have appeared in a variety of liveries, but suit the 1930s "house" style the best in many people's opinion and it is this guise that they are best known for carrying although they tend to carry several variations of this scheme. No.22 was at one point re-painted in the plain red and cream livery of the island's buses in 1999 in line with management whim, but this ultimately proved unpopular and she now carries the usual livery. She was also one of the cars selected for re-paint in 1957 upon nationalisation, carrying an experimental green and white livery for some time. Nos. 19 and 20 currently carry the 1950s "austere" livery, with 21 remaining in a hybrid colour scheme of recent years.

No.	Builder	Seating	Livery	Seats	Notes
No.19	G.F. Milnes & Co., Ltd.	Flip-Over Seats	Cream & Teak	48	Rarely out of traffic
No.20	G.F. Milnes & Co., Ltd.	Flip-Over Seats	Red, White & Teak	48	Used throughout the year
No.21	G.F. Milnes & Co., Ltd.	Flip-Over Seats	Red, White & Teak	48	Regularly runs 10,000+ miles per year
No.22	G.F. Milnes & Co., Ltd.	Flip-Over Seats	Red, White & Teak	48	Used throughout the year

== Gallery ==
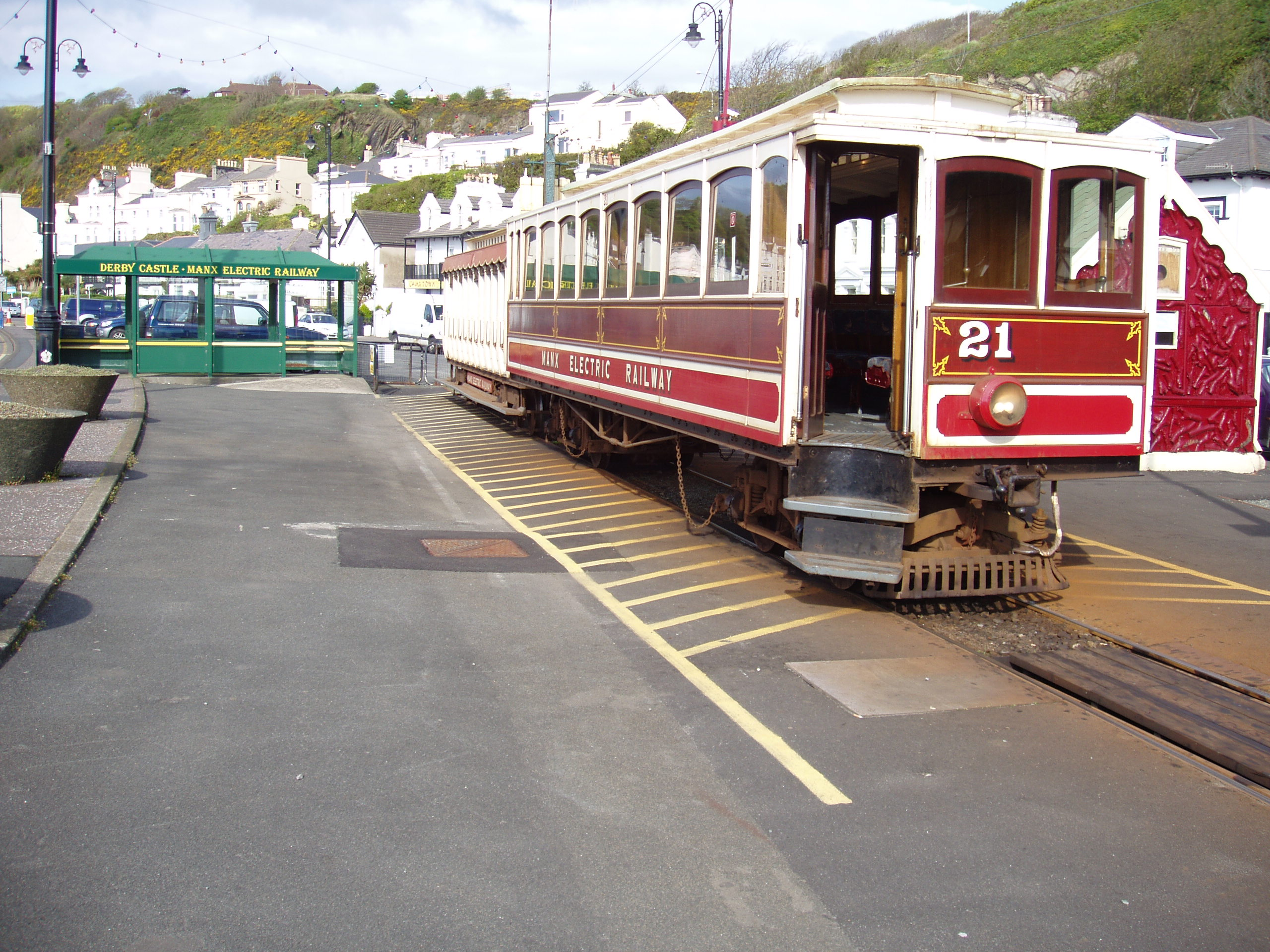
MER Car 21, at Derby Castle Station

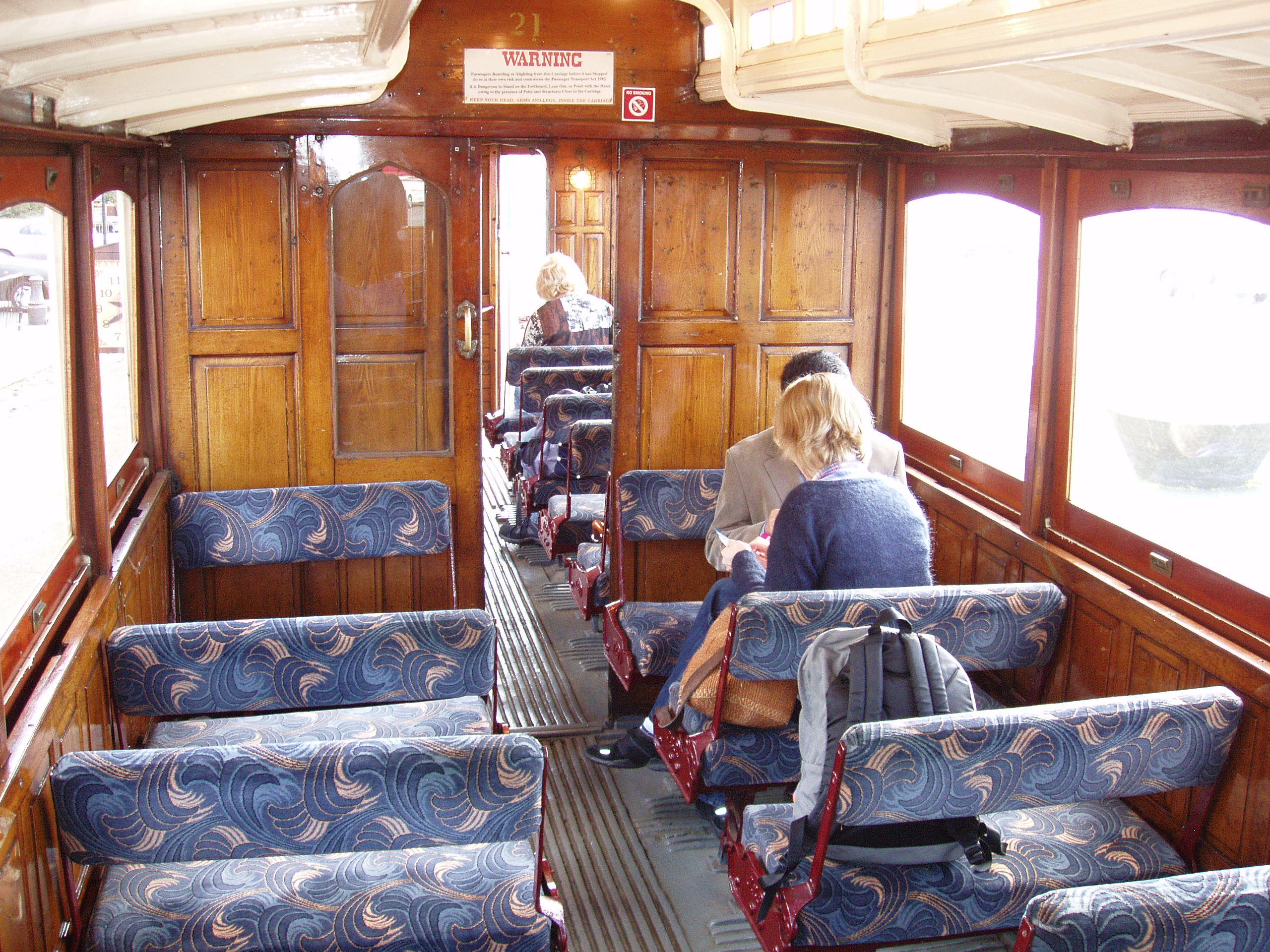
MER Car 21, inside view

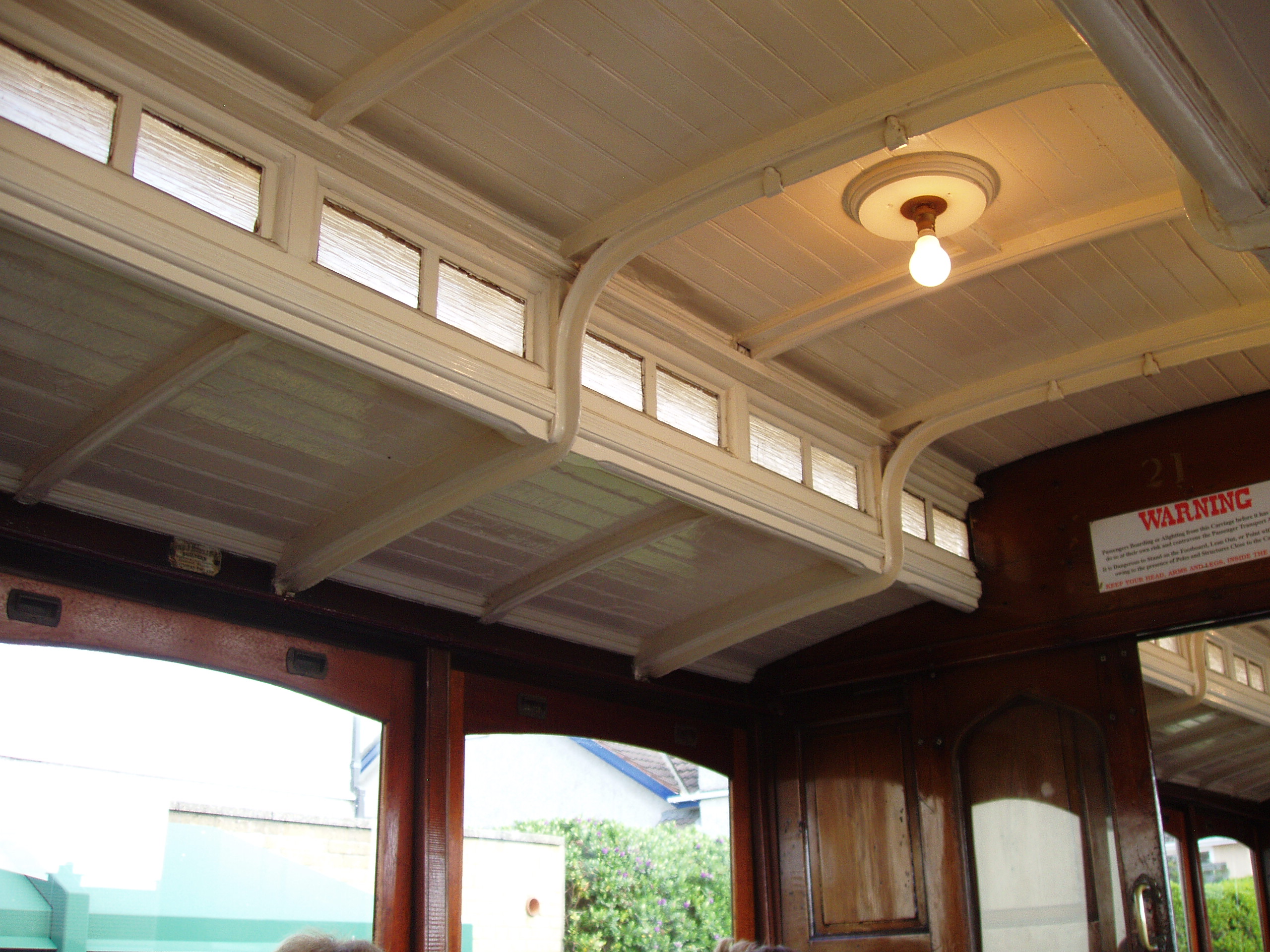
MER Car 21, ceiling details

== See also ==
- Manx Electric Railway rolling stock

== Sources ==
- Manx Manx Electric Railway Fleetlist (2002) Manx Electric Railway Society
- Island Island Images: Manx Electric Railway Pages (2003) Jon Wornham
- Official Official Tourist Department Page (2009) Isle Of Man Heritage Railways
- Tramcars | Manx Electric Railway Online Manx Electric Railway official website
