= Peckham Truck & Engineering Company =

The Peckham Truck & Engineering Company were suppliers of tram trucks (bogies) and other electrical equipment based in London, England. It eventually became part of Brush Traction.
