= Manx Electric Car 34 =

Car No. 34
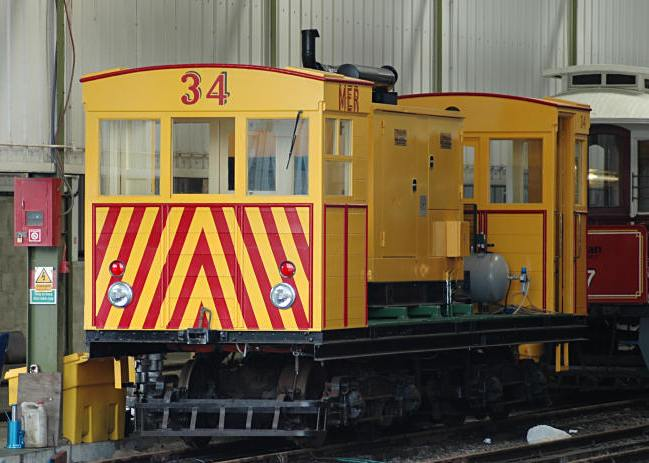
- Manufacturer: Manx Electric Railway
- Built at: Derby Castle Depôt
- Constructed: 1994/5
- Number built: 2 (Original & Replica)
- Number in service: 1 (Replica)
- Number scrapped: 1 (Original)
- Formation: Works Car (Two Cabs/Open Wagon)
- Capacity: Non-Passenger Vehicle
- Operator: Isle Of Man Heritage Railways
- Depot: Derby Castle Depôt

Specifications
- Traction system: 4 x SEHC 25 hp (19 kW)
- Power output: 100 hp (75 kW)
- Power supply: 100hp Atalanta Diesel Generator
- Braking system: Air
- Track gauge: 3 ft (914 mm)

Car No.34 (also Car No. 7 of the Snaefell Mountain Railway) in the Isle of Man is the only non-passenger tramcar on the Manx Electric Railway.

The original car was constructed in 1896, and was used to transport coal to the Snaefell-line Power Station. It was last used in winter 1924, before being stored for 30 years until 1954, where it was retrieved, however the condition it was in was too poor to salvage.

In late 1994 work began on the construction of a replica works car on the Snaefell Mountain Railway No. 7 (colloquially known as "Maria") intended to be an historical representation of this car as an attraction for the line's centenary the following year. After limited use on the mountain line and following a change of railway management the car was deemed to not be of use so it was converted to the 3' 0" gauge for use on the coastal line and re-numbered 34 in sequence with the line's other power cars. It was also painted in a high-visibility yellow and red livery and fitted with a large diesel generator so it can be used in the event of power failure. In 2025, for the Snaefell 130th Anniversary, No.34 was returned to its historical grey colourscheme and the No.7 was restored to the fronts of it. It is currently in regular use.

No.	Builder	Seating	Livery	Seats	Notes
No.34*	Manx Electric Railway	N/A	Grey	N/A	In regular use *Now No.7

== See also ==
- Manx Electric Railway rolling stock

== Sources ==
- Manx Manx Electric Railway Fleetlist (2002) Manx Electric Railway Society
- Island Island Images: Manx Electric Railway Pages (2003) Jon Wornham
- Official Official Tourist Department Page (2009) Isle Of Man Heritage Railways
