= Laxey Car Sheds =

Railway storage facility on the Isle of Man

Laxey Car Sheds Bwaagyn Charr Laksaa
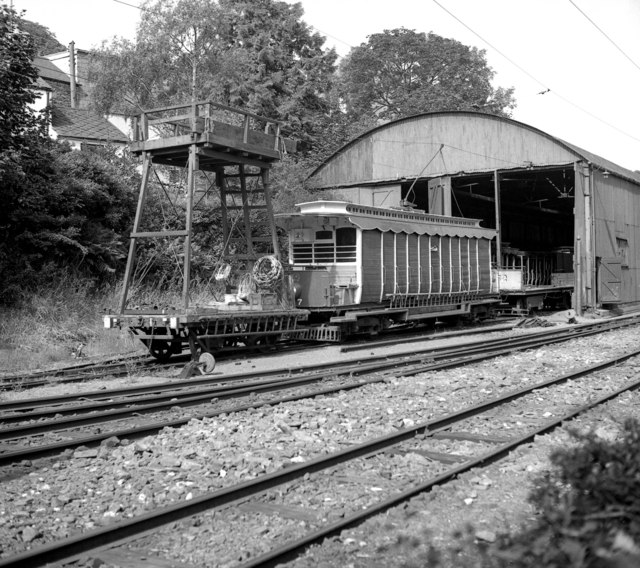

General information
- Location: Laxey, Isle Of Man
- Coordinates: 54.23035°N 4.40385°W
- Pole Nos.: 344 - 345
- System: Manx Electric Railway
- Owner: Isle Of Man Railways
- Platforms: Ground Level
- Tracks: Storage Lines / Headshunt

Construction
- Structure type: Three-Road Shed
- Parking: Staff Only

History
- Opened: 1894
- Rebuilt: 1931 / 2009
- Former names: Manx Electric Railway Co.
Location

Laxey Car Shed (Manx: Bwaagyn Charr Laksaa) is a storage facility for the Manx Electric Railway in the village of Laxey on the Isle of Man. It also serves as an intermediate stopping place on the line, being the last before reaching the mid-way point of the village station.

== Usage ==
It is used as a car shed to store service cars of the tramway and for many years was a storage site for unused passenger cars and trailers. It is notable for a disastrous fire that destroyed all contents in 1930, accounting for the only major loss of rolling stock that the railway has ever encountered, save for the 10-13 Class Trams which were short-lived and converted early on.

== Layout ==
The shed was originally fitted with four tracks and limited clearance but now houses three tracks, the site of the fourth having been given over to road vehicle storage. The shed was used for the storage of a steam locomotive during the successful Year Of Railways in 1993 and subsequent events, and at this time a longer headshunt was also installed to facilitate the shunting of rolling stock.

== Rebuild ==
In 1999 the roof was removed and all stored stock taken out for off-site storage remaining in this state for some time until, in 2008 action was taken to re-clad the structure which is now a functioning shed once more, the work being completed by 2009 with a three-road shed, one road being a cement surface to house the line's road vehicles.

== Halt ==
The running lines beside the shed are bisected by a public footpath and as such a diminutive stopping place exists here, having the same name as the sheds but with no nameboard to the effect. On occasion the shed and nearby substation are open to the public and on these occasions a shuttle service is operated from Laxey Station to avoid people walking over the nearby Glen Roy viaduct.

Preceding station	Manx Electric Railway	Following station
Miller's Crossing towards Derby Castle	Douglas–Ramsey	Laxey Village towards Ramsey Station

== Also ==
List of Manx Electric Railway stations

== Sources ==
- Manx Manx Electric Railway Stopping Places (2002) Manx Electric Railway Society
- Island Island Images: Manx Electric Railway Pages (2003) Jon Wornham
- Official Official Tourist Department Page (2009) Isle Of Man Heritage Railways
