= United Electric Car Company =

Former transportation company in England (1905–1917)

- Company type: Subsidiary
- Industry: Rail transport
- Founded: 1851; 175 years ago
- Defunct: 1917
- Fate: Merged into Dick, Kerr & Co.; becomes part of English Electric in 1918
- Successor: Dick, Kerr & Co.
- Headquarters: Preston, Lancashire, England, UK
- Area served: Worldwide
- Products: Locomotives; High-speed trains Intercity and commuter trains Trams; People movers Signalling systems

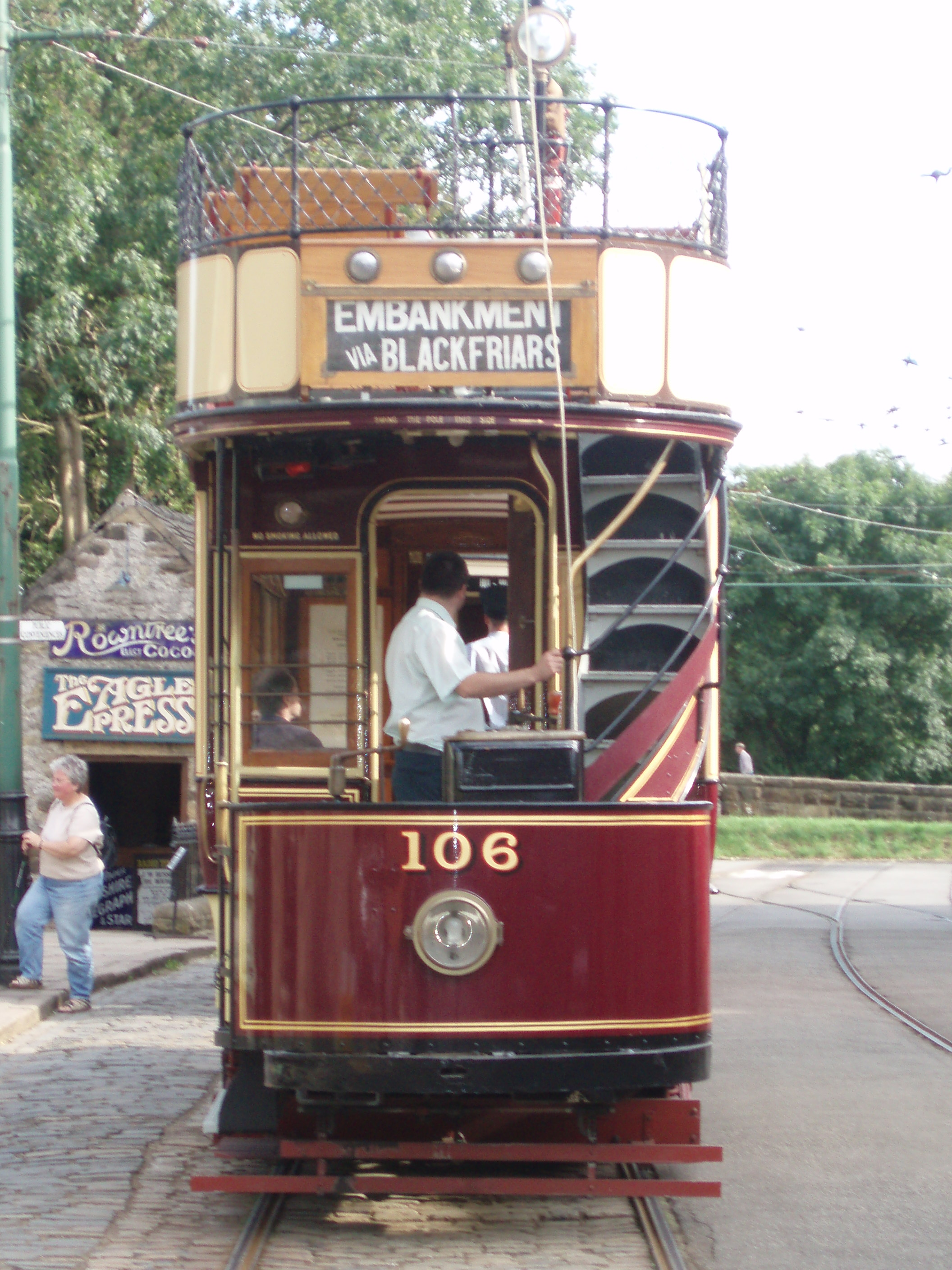
London 106 built in April 1903

The United Electric Car Company was a tramcar manufacturer from 1905 to 1917 in Preston, Lancashire, England.

== History ==
The Electric Railway and Tramway Carriage Works was formed in 1897 registered on 25 April 1898 to acquire works at Preston, Lancashire. It was founded by two Scots, W. B. Dick and John Kerr.

They formed a new company, English Electrical Manufacturing based in a new West Works on Strand Road, Preston in 1900, to build the electric motors for their trams.

In 1905 the Electric Railway and Tramway Carriage Works took over two other works, including G.F. Milnes & Co. in Hadley, Shropshire, the name being then changed to United Electric Car Co.

By 1914, the company employed around 2,000 people. They produced electrical equipment for tramways and railways and built over 8,000 tramcars, for service in the UK and abroad, including to the Hong Kong Tramways and Buenos Aires tramways operated by the Anglo-Argentine Tramways Company.

Tram 49 is operated by the Black Country Living Museum. This double decker tram was originally built in 1909 for Wolverhampton Corporation Tramways. It is a typical Edwardian tramcar with an ornate lower saloon and open upper deck with traverse seating. Originally equipped with the Lorain system taking its power supply from studs in the road, it was later converted to run from overhead wires. Preserved in 1976, the tram was painstakingly restored by the Black Country Museum Transport Group over many years and completed in 2004.

== Merger ==
In 1917 Dick, Kerr & Co., also in Strand Road, Preston, acquired the United Electric Car Co and in 1918 the Company became a part of English Electric.

== See also ==
- UEC Preston - used on Line A of the Buenos Aires Underground

== Archives and records ==
- United Electric Car Company photographs at Baker Library Special Collections, Harvard Business School.
