= G. F. Milnes & Co. =

UK tramcar manufacturer (1886–1905)

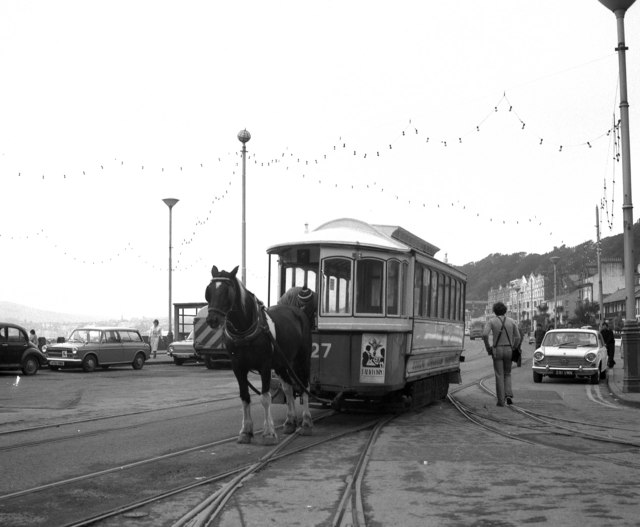
Horse drawn tramcar built in Birkenhead in 1892 on the Douglas Corporation Tramway (now Douglas Bay Horse Tramway)

G. F. Milnes & Co. Ltd was a British tramcar manufacturer based in Birkenhead, England (1886–1902) and Hadley, Shropshire, England (1900–1905).

== Starbuck Car and Wagon Company ==
George Starbuck established the first tramcar manufacturing business in Britain at 227 Cleveland Street, Birkenhead. It was incorporated as George Starbuck and Company on 12 September 1871.

It was re-registered one year later as Starbuck Car and Wagon Company Ltd., on 6 November 1872.

In 1878, George Frederick Milnes of Liverpool, became Company Secretary and in 1886, purchased the factory and assets following the winding-up of the company. The business was renamed George F. Milnes and Co. and they evolved into successful tramcar manufacturers, with customers throughout Britain and a substantial export trade.

== G. F. Milnes & Co ==
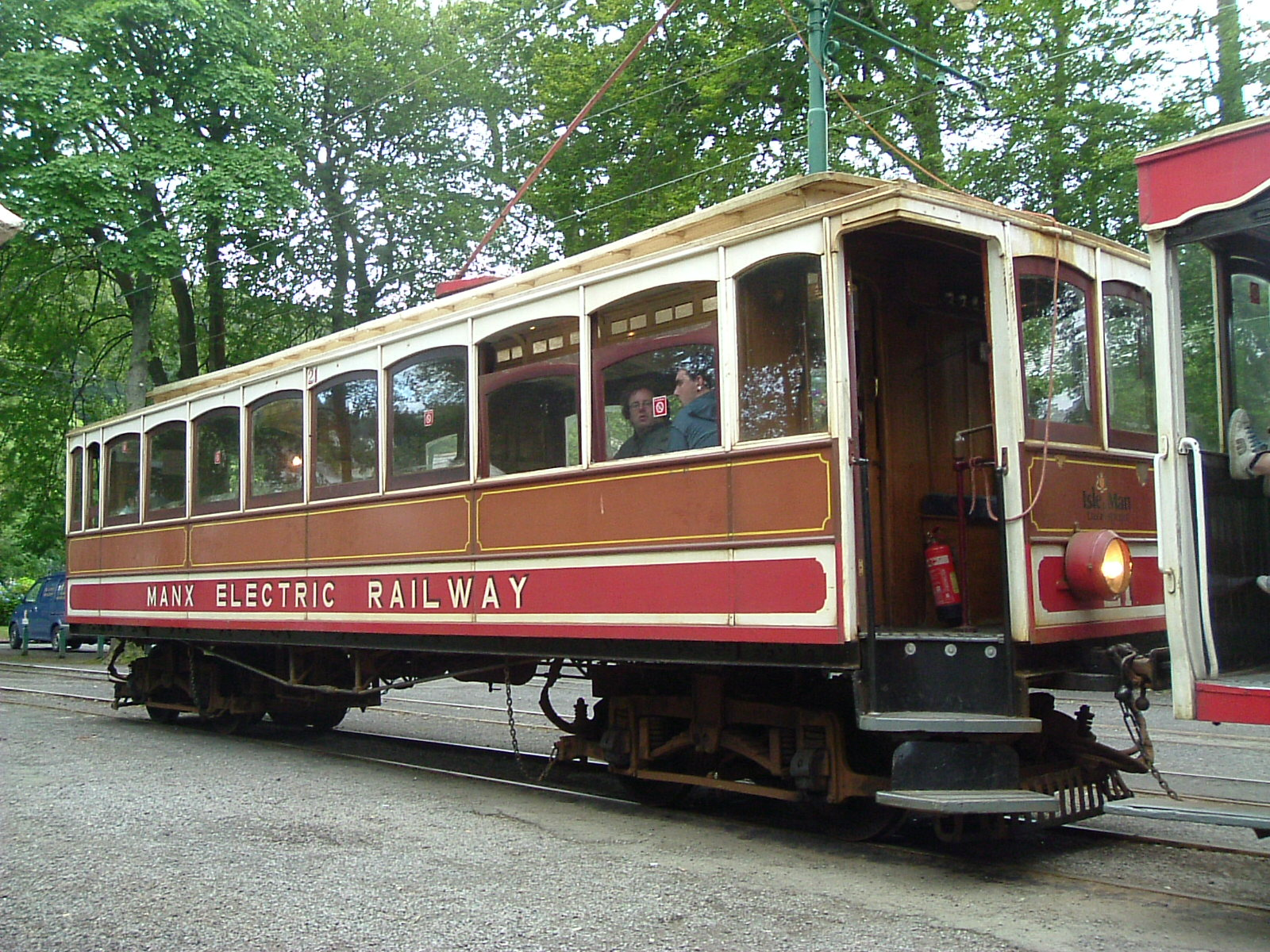
Milnes car on the Manx Electric Railway

On 10 September 1898 the business was registered as a limited company, and the following year the site for a new and larger works (Castle Car Works) was purchased at Hadley, Shropshire. Production commenced at Hadley in June 1900, and the works in Birkenhead closed in 1902. There were around 700 employees and 701 tramcars were built in 1901. The business benefitted from the rush of orders when horse and steam tramway systems were converted to electric traction, but the market had begun to contract by the beginning of 1903. The company went into receivership in September and, after some complex manoeuvering, became part of the United Electric Car Company Ltd. in June 1905.

The Hadley Works were leased to the Metropolitan Amalgamated Railway Carriage and Wagon Co. Ltd. of Birmingham. In 1908 falling orders again forced a closure but most of the employees were offered jobs in the Birmingham area and the Hadley works were then sold in 1910 to Joseph Sankey and Company.

== Milnes Voss ==
In the meantime, production of tramcars in Birkenhead, was continued by Milnes's son, George Comer Milnes, in partnership with Thomas Voss. Milnes Voss & Co. in fact specialised in the supply of tramcar parts and the fitting of patent "top covers" to existing open-top trams, but they manufactured a small number of complete tramcars. The Milnes Voss works were also in Cleveland Street but on a different site.

Milnes Voss was wound up in 1913–1914.
