= Derby Castle Depôt =

Derby Castle Depôt Kione Art-Hie Chashtal Derby
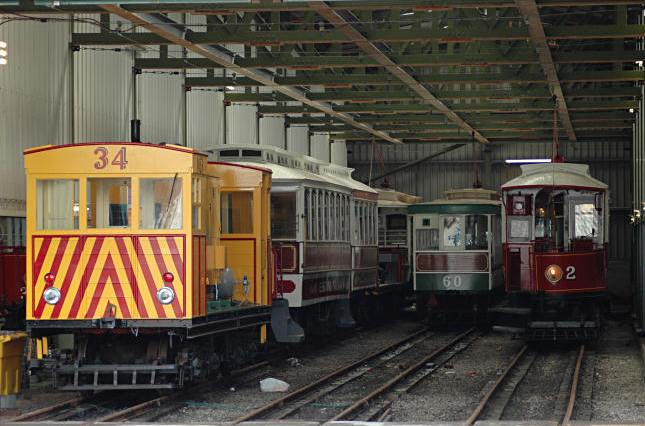

General information
- Location: Douglas, Isle Of Man
- Coordinates: 54.16696°N 4.45620°W
- Pole No.: 010-013
- System: Manx Electric Railway
- Platforms: None (Depôt Only)
- Tracks: Various

Construction
- Structure type: Various (See Text)
- Platform levels: Three
- Parking: Staff Only

History
- Opened: 1893
- Rebuilt: Various (See Text)
Location

Derby Castle Depôt is the main location of workshops and running sheds of the Manx Electric Railway on the Isle of Man and lies at the northerly end of the promenade at Douglas; it takes its name from the adjoining site which was once home to the Earls of Derby, rulers of the island, and later extended to form an entertainment complex of the same name before being demolished and replaced by the ill-fated Summerland complex in 1968.

== Illumination ==
The location of the depôt can be seen from across the sweep of Douglas Bay and is marked by a large illuminated sign with the words "Electric Railway" in the cliffs above the sheds. This was reinstated in 1993 as part of the Year Of Railways celebrations marking the line's centenary, previous incarnations having been removed several years previously. The site of today's sign once held a similar illuminated sign which read "M.E.R. For Scenery", and a similar sign denoting the presence of Derby Castle was located on the hillside approximately behind the Strathallan Hotel (now the Terminus Tavern near the station). A Further sign in the same style was erected at the southern end of the White City amusement complex but this was removed in 1985.

== Site ==
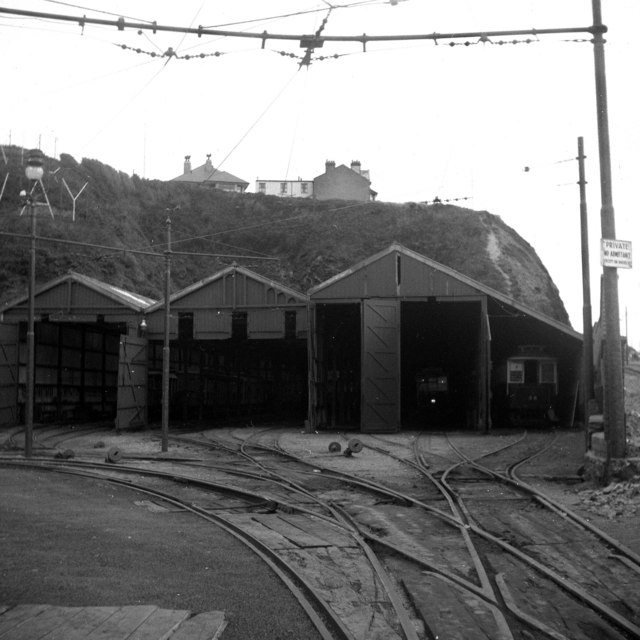
The depot in 1962

Where the depôt lies is a reclaimed site, having once been Port-E-Vada Creek it was filled to make way for the railway in 1892 necessitating major works. Originally the site was home to the power station that created the electricity that powered the line. A pathway runs parallel and then behind the depôt to the headland above, running behind the illuminated signage, offering an impressive birds-eye view of the site.

== Sheds ==
The shed to the right of the yard was completed in 1998 replacing an original building that had stood since the earliest days of the railway; whilst in a similar style to the original, the current incarnation is a steel clad affair, whereas the original had wooden doors and sides. At the bottom of the yard lie original buildings comprising the workshops and paint shops; to the far left the stone structure is part of the original power station, the tall chimney having long since disappeared.

== Changes 1988 ==
There was significant alteration to the site in 1988, including the removal of the "bonner siding" that was used initially in connection with the road-rail wagons of the same name, one road connected to the car shed and joiners' shop was lifted, and a new oil and paint store, and new works office were constructed between the two sets of car sheds. The ex-Aachen tramcar that also was stored at this point was destroyed to make way for these modifications. The site office at the mouth of the yard was however retained and is still used for this purpose today, being a characteristic of the site.

== Rebuild 1999 ==
As part of the management's continued commitment to refurbish and improve facilities on the railway, the upper car sheds which had been built between 1894 and 1924 were completely demolished and new versions constructed on the same site. This was not without its controversy as local group the Manx Electric Railway Society were vocal in their support for alternative accommodation, ultimately being ignored. The new shed was not without problems initially, the two lower (left hand) roads being on such a lower level than the others that they could not be rail-connected. The overhead wiring also caused difficulties but ultimately the new fully functioning carshed is a vast improvement on the original which had decayed beyond economic repair.

== Outbuildings ==
At the mouth of the yard lies a green corrugated hut, which is the signing-in area for staff, it too dates from the early days of the line. Between the two main sheds is an ablutions block with toilets and shower facilities for the staff. In the past there have been various other edifices, including an ex-Aachen tramcar used as a store in the 1970s among others. Being on an unusually shaped site, the buildings and associated sheds are all at different levels to accommodate rail access at various levels.

== Tommy Milner ==
High atop the lower sheds is a figure that takes the form of a tightrope walker; this character is known at Tommy Milner and legend has it that if the figure were to be removed from its position, disaster would befall the railway. True to form, it was removed for repairs in 1992 and a disastrous fire ripped through the bottom shed, all but destroying winter saloon No. 22 (but this was subsequently rebuilt). The figure was returned and has not been removed since.

== Also ==
Manx Electric Railway Stations

== Sources ==
- Manx Manx Electric Railway Stopping Places (2002) Manx Electric Railway Society
- Island Island Images: Manx Electric Railway Pages (2003) Jon Wornham
- Official Official Tourist Department Page (2009) Isle Of Man Heritage Railways
