= Kerruish =

Kerruish (/kəˈruːʃ/ kə-ROOSH) is a Manx surname. Notable people with the surname include:

- Charles Kerruish (1917–2003), Speaker of the House of Keys
- Mike Kerruish (1948–2010), First Deemster and politician
- Sarah Kerruish, documentary director, producer and writer

== See also ==
- Ballafayle (Kerruish) Halt
