= Rome's Crossing =

Railway station in Isle of Man, the UK

Rome's Crossing Crossag Rome
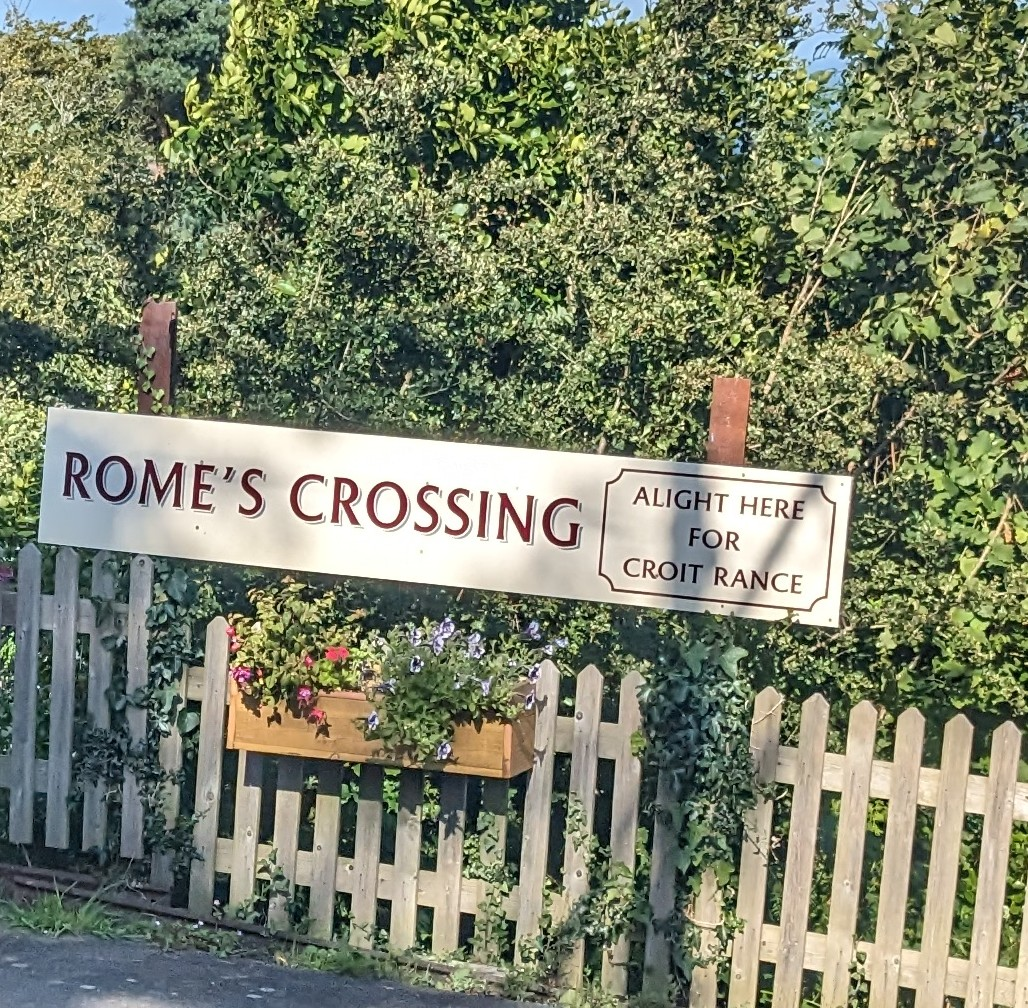

General information
- Location: Maughold, Isle Of Man
- Coordinates: 54.2852221°N 4.3354392°W
- Pole Nos.: 752-753
- System: Manx Electric Railway
- Owner: Isle Of Man Railways
- Platforms: Ground Level
- Tracks: Two Running Lines

Construction
- Structure type: None
- Parking: None

History
- Opened: 19??
- Former names: Manx Electric Railway Co.
Location

Rome's Crossing Halt (Manx: Stadd Crossag Rome) is an intermediate stop on the northerly section of the Manx Electric Railway on the Isle of Man. It serves the holiday let Croit Rance and is located in the parish of Maughold.

== Route ==
Preceding station	Manx Electric Railway	Following station
Ballafayle (Kerruish) towards Derby Castle	Douglas–Ramsey	Ballajora towards Ramsey Station

== See also ==
Manx Electric Railway Stations

== Sources ==
- Manx Manx Electric Railway Stopping Places (2002) Manx Electric Railway Society
- Island Island Images: Manx Electric Railway Pages (2003) Jon Wornham
- Official Official Tourist Department Page (2009) Isle Of Man Heritage Railways
