= Ballajora (ME) Halt =

Railway station in Isle of Man, the UK

Ballajora Balley Joaree
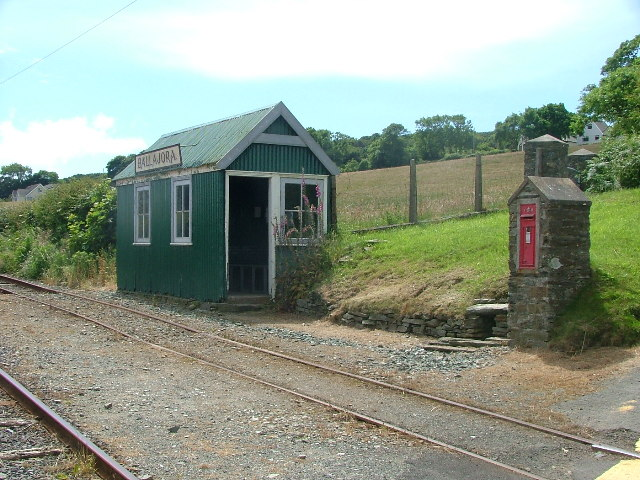

General information
- Location: Maughold, Isle Of Man
- Coordinates: 54°17′20″N 4°20′10″W
- System: Manx Electric Railway
- Owner: Isle Of Man Railways
- Platforms: Ground Level
- Tracks: Two Running Lines

Construction
- Structure type: Waiting Shelter
- Parking: None

History
- Opened: 1899
- Former names: Manx Electric Railway Co.
Location

Ballajora Halt (Manx: Stadd Valley Joaree) is an intermediate stopping place on the northerly section of the Manx Electric Railway on the Isle of Man. It is in the parish of Maughold and is the nearest stop to the village of Maughold and its churchyard, known for its Celtic crosses.

== Route ==
Preceding station	Manx Electric Railway	Following station
Rome's Crossing towards Derby Castle	Douglas–Ramsey	Ballajora Quarry towards Ramsey Station

== See also ==
- Manx Electric Railway stations

== Sources ==
- Manx Manx Electric Railway Stopping Places (2002) Manx Electric Railway Society
- Island Island Images: Manx Electric Railway Pages (2003) Jon Wornham
- Official Tourist Department Page (2009) Isle Of Man Heritage Railways
