= Ballafayle (Corteen's) Halt =

Railway station in Isle of Man, the UK

Coordinates: 54°15′01″N 4°22′35″W

Ballafayle (Corteen's) Balley Fayle (Corteen)
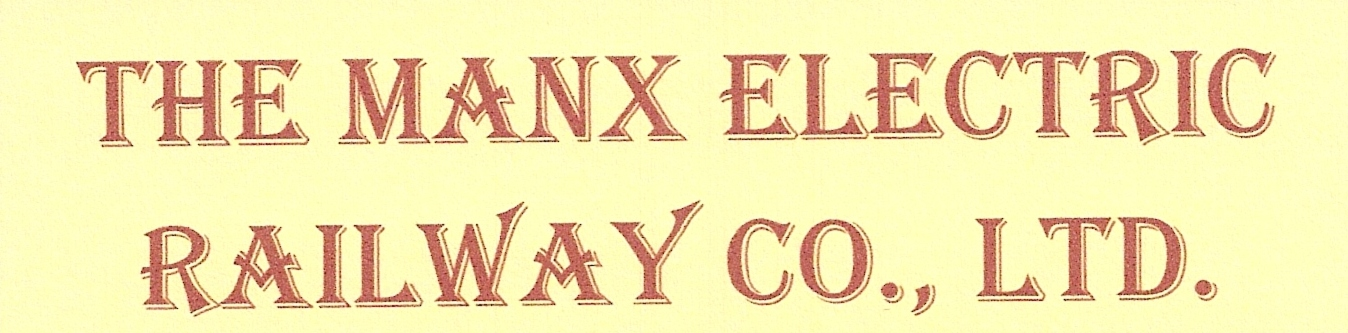

General information
- Location: Pole Nos. 730-731, Maughold, Isle Of Man
- System: Manx Electric Railway
- Owner: Isle Of Man Railways
- Platforms: Ground Level
- Tracks: Two Running Lines

Construction
- Structure type: None
- Parking: None

History
- Opened: 1900
- Former names: Manx Electric Railway Co.
Location

Ballafayle (Corteen's) Halt (Manx: Stadd Valley Fayle Corteen) is a stop on the Manx Electric Railway on the Isle of Man.

Preceding station	Manx Electric Railway	Following station
Ballskeig towards Derby Castle	Douglas–Ramsey	Ballacannell towards Ramsey Station

== Also ==
Manx Electric Railway Stations

== Sources ==
- Manx Manx Electric Railway Stopping Places (2002) Manx Electric Railway Society
- Island Island Images: Manx Electric Railway Pages (2003) Jon Wornham
- Official Tourist Department Page (2009) Isle Of Man Heritage Railways
