= Ballacannell Halt =

Railway station in Isle of Man, the UK

Ballacannell Balley Cannell
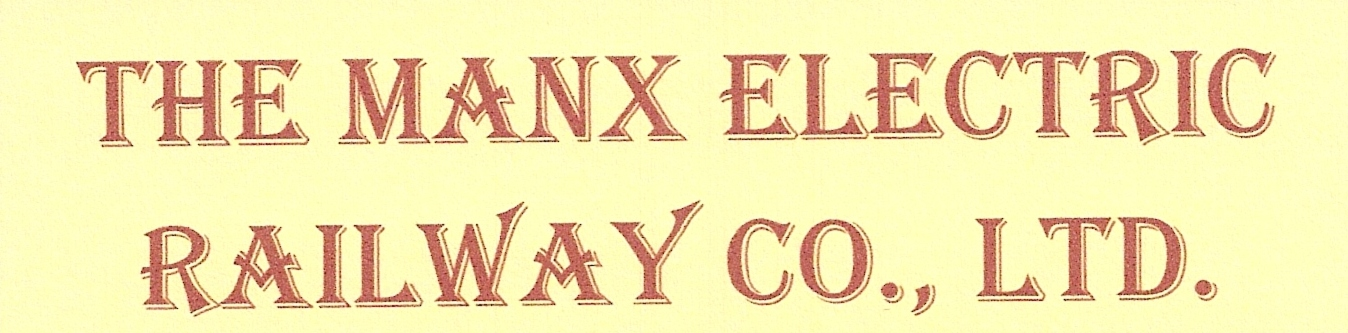

General information
- Location: Maughold, Isle Of Man
- Coordinates: 54.27989°N 4.33951°W
- Pole Nos.: 733-734
- System: Manx Electric Railway
- Owner: Isle Of Man Railways
- Platforms: Ground Level
- Tracks: Two Running Lines

Construction
- Structure type: None
- Parking: None

History
- Opened: 19??
- Former names: Manx Electric Railway Co.
Location

Ballacannell Halt (Manx: Stadd Valley Cannell) (sometimes "Ballacannall") is a stop on the Manx Electric Railway on the Isle of Man. This tram station is parallel to Ramsey Road on the A2 road between the villages of Ballaragh and Glen Mona. This station is near Dhoon Glen.

Preceding station	Manx Electric Railway	Following station
Ballafayle (Corteen's) towards Derby Castle	Douglas–Ramsey	Ballafayle (Kerruish) towards Ramsey Station

== Also ==
Manx Electric Railway Stations

== Sources ==
- Manx Manx Electric Railway Stopping Places (2002) Manx Electric Railway Society
- Island Island Images: Manx Electric Railway Pages (2003) Jon Wornham
- Official Tourist Department Page (2009) Isle Of Man Heritage Railways
