= Dreemskerry Halt =

Railway station in Isle of Man, UK

Dreemskerry Dreeym y Sker
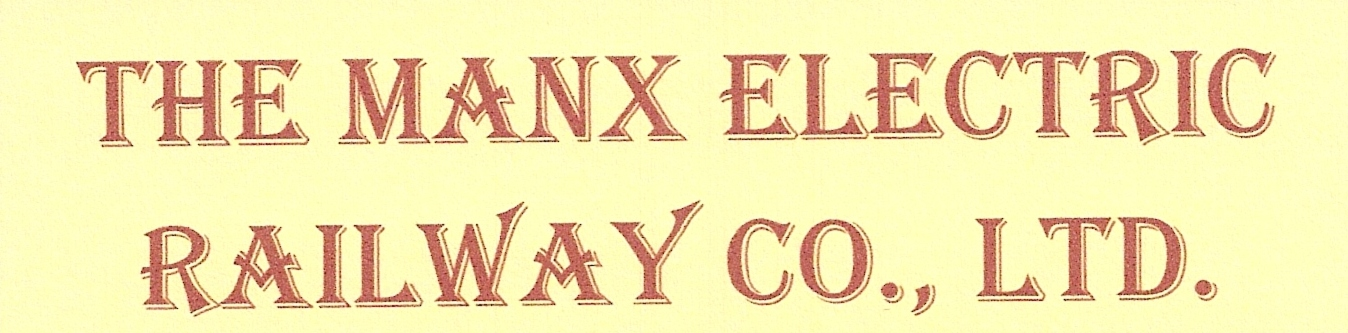

General information
- Location: Maughold, Isle Of Man
- Coordinates: 54.2976494°N 4.3465155°W
- Pole Nos.: 779-780
- System: Manx Electric Railway
- Owner: Isle Of Man Railways
- Platforms: Ground Level
- Tracks: Two Running Lines

Construction
- Structure type: None
- Parking: None

History
- Opened: 1898
- Former names: Manx Electric Railway Co.
Location

Dreemskerry Halt (Manx: Stadd Dreeym y Sker) is an intermediate stopping place on the northerly section of the Manx Electric Railway on the Isle of Man.

== Route ==
Preceding station	Manx Electric Railway	Following station
Ballajora Quarry towards Derby Castle	Douglas–Ramsey	Crowville towards Ramsey Station

== Also ==
Manx Electric Railway Stations

== Sources ==
- Manx Manx Electric Railway Stopping Places (2002) Manx Electric Railway Society
- Island Island Images: Manx Electric Railway Pages (2003) Jon Wornham
- Official Official Tourist Department Page (2009) Isle Of Man Heritage Railways
