= Dreemskerry Farm Halt =

Railway station on the Isle of Man

Dreemskerry Farm Valley Dreeym y Sker
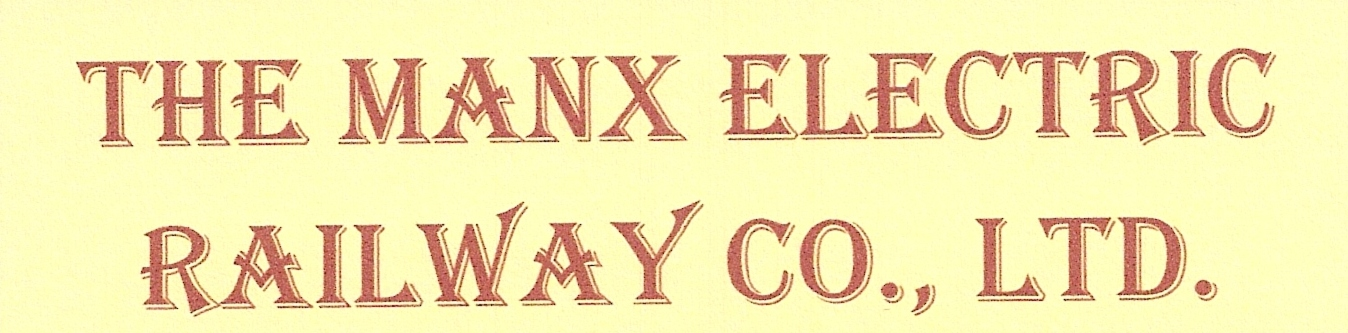

General information
- Location: Maughold, Isle Of Man
- Coordinates: 54.2975675°N 4.3464118°W
- Pole Nos.: 795-796
- System: Manx Electric Railway
- Owner: Isle Of Man Railways
- Platforms: Ground level
- Tracks: Two running lines

Construction
- Structure type: None
- Parking: None

History
- Opened: 19??
- Former names: Manx Electric Railway Co.
Location

Dreemskerry Farm Halt (Manx: Stadd Valley Dreeym y Sker) is an intermediate stopping place on the northerly section of the Manx Electric Railway on the Isle of Man.

== Route ==
| Preceding station | Manx Electric Railway | Following station |
|---|---|---|
| Crowville towards Derby Castle | Douglas–Ramsey | Lewaigue towards Ramsey Station |

== See also ==
- Manx Electric Railway Stations

== Sources ==
- Manx Manx Electric Railway Stopping Places (2002) Manx Electric Railway Society
- Island Island Images: Manx Electric Railway Pages (2003) Jon Wornham
- Official Official Tourist Department Page (2009) Isle Of Man Heritage Railways
