= Lewaigue railway station =

Railway station in Isle of Man, the UK

Lewaigue Lewaigue
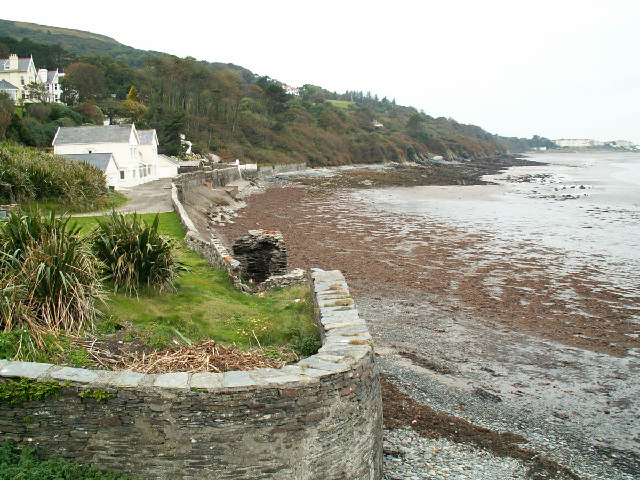

General information
- Location: Maughold, Isle Of Man
- Coordinates: 54°18′09″N 4°21′11″W
- Pole Nos.: 811-812
- System: Manx Electric Railway
- Owner: Isle Of Man Railways
- Platforms: Ground Level
- Tracks: Two Running Lines

Construction
- Structure type: Waiting Shelter
- Parking: None

History
- Opened: 1899
- Former names: Manx Electric Railway Co.
Location

Lewaigue Halt (Manx: Stadd Lewaigue) is an intermediate stopping place on the northern section of the Manx Electric Railway on the Isle of Man.

== Location ==
The stop can be found between Ballajora Station and 'Belle Vue (For Port-E-Vullen)'. The poles bearing the overhead lines on the line are numbered from Derby Castle, the railway's southern terminus, and Lewaigue Halt can be found between pole numbers 811 and 812. The halt is located on Jack's Lane (designated C13) in the hamlet of Lewaigue.

== Usage ==
The stop is widely used by The Venture Centre, a nearby outdoor pursuits centre. The stop consists of a waiting shelter for passengers, erected in 1987. The former corrugated iron shelter was demolished in 1986 after vandalism.

Preceding station	Manx Electric Railway	Following station
Dreemskerry Farm towards Derby Castle	Douglas–Ramsey	Belle Vue towards Ramsey Station

== Also ==
Manx Electric Railway Stations

== Sources ==
- Manx Electric Railway Stopping Places (2002) Manx Electric Railway Society
- Island Images: Manx Electric Railway Pages (2003) Jon Wornham
- Official Tourist Department Page (2009) Isle Of Man Heritage Railways
