= Ballafayle (Kerruish) Halt =

Railway station in Isle of Man, the UK

Coordinates: 54.2825221°N 4.3350873°W

Ballafayle (Kerruish) Balley Fayle (Kerruish)
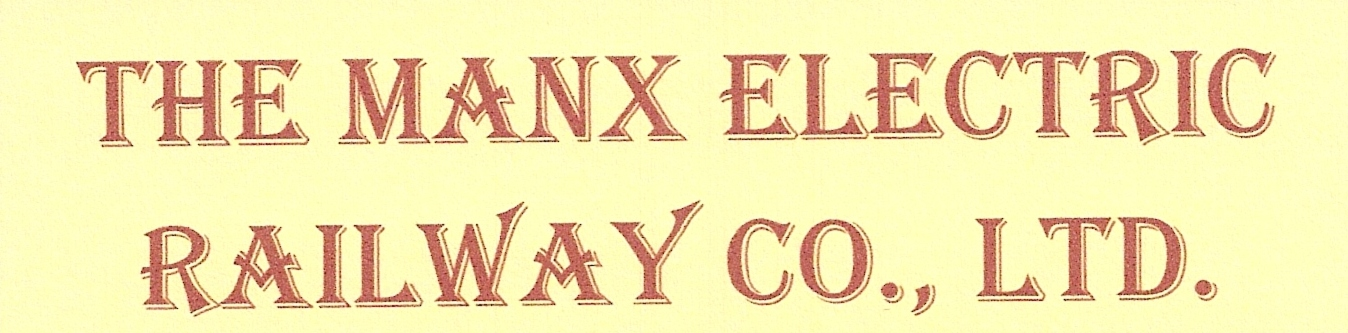

General information
- Location: Maughold, Isle Of Man
- Pole Nos.: 744-745
- System: Manx Electric Railway
- Owner: Isle Of Man Railways
- Platforms: Ground Level
- Tracks: Two Running Lines

Construction
- Structure type: None
- Parking: None

History
- Opened: 19??
- Former names: Manx Electric Railway Co.
Location

Ballafayle (Kerruish) Halt (Manx: Stadd Valley Fayle Kerruish) is an intermediate stopping point on the Manx Electric Railway on the Isle of Man. Like many such intermediate stopping points, it is not marked on most maps, nor is it shown on the railway timetable.

== Location ==
It is at or near the easternmost point on the Manx Electric Railway, about 5 km SE of Ramsey. The area in which it is situated is home to two farms, which has led over time to there being two named stopping points on the railway, denoting each farmer's name. Ballafayle (Kerruish) was once at the farm of the island's Chairman of the Executive Council, Sir Charles Kerruish.

| Preceding station | Manx Electric Railway | Following station |
|---|---|---|
| Ballacannell towards Derby Castle | Douglas–Ramsey | Rome's Crossing towards Ramsey Station |

== Also ==
Manx Electric Railway Stations

== Sources ==
- Manx Manx Electric Railway Stopping Places (2002) Manx Electric Railway Society
- Island Island Images: Manx Electric Railway Pages (2003) Jon Wornham
- Official Tourist Department Page (2009) Isle Of Man Heritage Railways
