= 2009–10 Isle of Man League =

Isle of Man Football League
- Season: 2009–10

The 2009–10 Isle of Man League was the 101st season of the Isle of Man Football League on the Isle of Man.

== League tables ==
=== Premier League ===
Pos	Team	Pld	W	D	L	GF	GA	GD	Pts	Relegation
1	Rushen United (C)	24	20	3	1	64	17	+47	63	
2	St Marys	24	19	1	4	85	28	+57	58	
3	Laxey	24	17	5	2	69	21	+48	56	
4	Peel	24	16	3	5	72	31	+41	48 (Note: Peel and St Georges deducted three points)	
5	St Georges	24	13	4	7	61	30	+31	40	
6	Douglas HSOB	24	12	3	9	53	45	+8	39	
7	Castletown Metropolitan	24	9	2	13	39	48	−9	29	
8	Gymnasium	24	9	2	13	53	66	−13	29	
9	Corinthians	24	8	2	14	36	57	−21	26	
10	Ramsey	24	6	6	12	30	52	−22	24	
11	Michael United	24	4	4	16	33	80	−47	16	
12	St Johns United (R)	24	4	1	19	24	71	−47	13	Relegation to Isle of Man League Division 2
13	Union Mills (R)	24	1	0	23	22	95	−73	3	Relegation to Isle of Man League Division 2

Updated to match(es) played on April 2010. Source:
Rules for classification: 1) points; 2) goal difference; 3) number of goals scored.
(C) Champions; (R) Relegated

=== Division 2 ===
Pos	Team	Pld	W	D	L	GF	GA	GD	Pts	Promotion
1	Douglas Royal (C, P)	24	19	1	4	103	48	+55	58	Promotion to Isle of Man League Premier Division
2	Ayre United (P)	24	18	2	4	100	30	+70	56	Promotion to Isle of Man League Premier Division
3	Colby	24	13	4	7	70	41	+29	43	
4	Pulrose United	24	14	1	9	60	45	+15	43	
5	Braddan	24	13	3	8	61	48	+13	42	
6	Marown	24	13	3	8	76	47	+29	39 (Note: Marown deducted three points)	
7	Foxdale	24	11	6	7	54	50	+4	39	
8	Ramsey YCOB	24	9	5	10	58	59	−1	32	
9	Onchan	24	6	6	12	35	54	−19	24	
10	Ronaldsway	24	6	4	14	42	89	−47	22	
11	Malew	24	6	3	15	35	77	−42	21	
12	Douglas and District	24	5	2	17	38	90	−52	17	
13	Police	24	2	2	20	29	83	−54	8	

Updated to match(es) played on April 2010. Source:
Rules for classification: 1) points; 2) goal difference; 3) number of goals scored.
(C) Champions; (P) Promoted

== Cups ==
Cup results for 2009–10:

=== FA Cup ===
St Georges 3–2 AET Rushen United

=== Railway Cup ===
Peel 2–0 Rushen United

=== Hospital Cup ===
Douglas HSOB 1–2 Peel

=== Woods Cup ===
Douglas Royal 4–0 Ayre United

=== Paul Henry Gold Cup ===
Ayre United bt on pens Pulrose United

=== Cowell Cup (U19) ===
Castletown Metropolitan 3–0 Ramsey YCOB
