= 2017–18 Isle of Man Football League =

Season of the Isle of Man League

Isle of Man Football League
- Season: 2017–18

The 2017–18 Isle of Man League was the 109th season of the Isle of Man Football League on the Isle of Man. St Georges were the defending champion, having won the championship the previous season.

== Promotion and relegation following the 2016–17 season ==
=== From the Premier League ===
Relegated to Division 2

- Ayre United
- Union Mills

=== From Division Two ===
Promoted to the Premier League

- Braddan
- Douglas Royal

== Premier League ==
Location of the clubs in the 2017–18 Isle of Man Premier League

=== Teams ===
Team	Location	Stadium	Capacity
Braddan	Douglas	Cronkbourne Football Ground	
Colby	Colby	Station Road	
Corinthians	Douglas	Ballafletcher Sports Ground	
Douglas Athletic	Douglas	Groves Road	
Douglas HSOB	Onchan	Blackberry Lane	
Douglas Royal	Douglas	Ballafletcher Sports Ground	
Laxey	Laxey	Laxey Football Ground	
Peel	Peel	Peel A.F.C Football Ground	
Ramsey	Ramsey	Ballacloan Stadium	
Rushen United	Port Erin	Croit Lowey	
St Georges	Douglas	The Campsite	
St Johns United	St John's	St John's Football Ground	
St Marys	Douglas	The Bowl	3,000

=== League table ===
Pos	Team	Pld	W	D	L	GF	GA	GD	Pts	Promotion or relegation
1	St Georges (C)	23	21	1	1	140	30	+110	64	
2	Peel	24	18	2	4	111	36	+75	56	
3	Rushen United	24	18	1	5	91	32	+59	55	
4	Corinthians	23	17	1	5	100	22	+78	52	
5	St Johns United	24	10	8	6	75	57	+18	38	
6	Douglas HSOB	24	10	7	7	51	41	+10	37	
7	St Marys	24	11	3	10	77	66	+11	36	
8	Laxey	24	10	1	13	64	83	−19	31	
9	Douglas Athletic	24	9	1	14	55	83	−28	28	
10	Douglas Royal	24	4	3	17	39	112	−73	15	
11	Braddan	24	4	2	18	33	108	−75	14	
12	Ramsey (R)	24	3	2	19	26	103	−77	11	Relegated to Isle of Man Division Two
13	Colby (R)	24	3	2	19	29	122	−93	11	Relegated to Isle of Man Division Two

Updated to match(es) played on 15 May 2018. Source: FA Full-Time
Rules for classification: 1) Points; 2) Goal difference; 3) Number of goals scored; 4) Number of matches won; 5) Head-to-head results
(C) Champions; (R) Relegated

== Division Two ==
Location of the clubs in the 2017–18 Isle of Man Division Two

=== Teams ===
Team	Location	Stadium	Capacity
Ayre United	Andreas	Andreas Playing Fields	
Castletown Metropolitan	Castletown	Castletown Football Stadium	
Douglas and District	Douglas	Nobles Park	
Foxdale	Foxdale	Billy Goat Park	
Governors Athletic	Douglas	Bemahague School 3G Pitch	
Gymnasium	Douglas	Tromode Park	
Malew	Ballasalla	Malew Football Ground	
Marown	Crosby	Memorial Playing Fields	
Michael United	Kirk Michael	Lough Ny Magher	
Onchan	Onchan	Nivison Stadium	
Pulrose United	Douglas	Groves Road Stadium	
Ramsey YCOB	Ramsey	Scoill Ree Gorree	
Union Mills	Union Mills	Garey Mooar	

=== League table ===
Pos	Team	Pld	W	D	L	GF	GA	GD	Pts	Promotion or relegation
1	Marown (C, P)	24	18	2	4	98	36	+62	56	Promotion to Isle of Man Premier League
2	Castletown Metropolitan (P)	24	18	2	4	90	33	+57	56	Promotion to Isle of Man Premier League
3	Foxdale	24	17	3	4	102	33	+69	54	
4	Pulrose United	24	17	1	6	91	38	+53	52	
5	Onchan	24	14	2	8	60	42	+18	44	
6	Ramsey YCOB	24	13	4	7	92	38	+54	43	
7	Malew	24	13	2	9	79	68	+11	41	
8	Union Mills	24	12	4	8	88	69	+19	40	
9	Douglas and District	24	7	2	15	43	85	−42	23	
10	Ayre United	24	5	2	17	45	93	−48	17	
11	Michael United	24	3	4	17	33	113	−80	13	
12	Gymnasium	24	3	1	20	41	108	−67	10	
13	Governors Athletic	24	1	1	22	36	142	−106	4	

Updated to match(es) played on 17 May 2018. Source: FA Full-Time
Rules for classification: 1) Points; 2) Goal difference; 3) Number of goals scored; 4) Number of matches won; 5) Head-to-head results
(C) Champions; (P) Promoted
