= 2008–09 Isle of Man League =

Isle of Man Football League
- Season: 2008–09

The 2008–09 Isle of Man League was the 100th season of Football league on the Isle of Man.

There were two tiers of men's football, consisting of 27 clubs, the Sure Mobile Premier League and the CFS Division Two. There were six senior cup competitions – the Manx FA Cup, Railway Cup, Hospital Cup, Woods Cup, Paul Henry Gold Cup and the Charity Shield. Each club had a reserve team in the Isle of Man Football Combination, and they compete in the Junior Cup. There was also the Cowell Cup, an annual under-19 tournament.

== League tables ==
=== Premier League ===
Pos	Team	Pld	W	D	L	GF	GA	GD	Pts	Relegation
1	St Georges (C)	24	18	4	2	85	28	+57	58	
2	Peel	24	18	3	3	74	27	+47	57	
3	Rushen United	24	17	2	5	60	26	+34	53	
4	St Marys	24	16	3	5	62	40	+22	51	
5	Douglas HSOB	24	16	2	6	68	43	+25	50	
6	Laxey	24	11	3	10	49	37	+12	36	
7	Gymnasium	24	7	6	11	58	70	−12	27	
8	Ramsey	24	8	2	14	40	50	−10	26	
9	Michael United	24	6	4	14	34	68	−34	22	
10	Union Mills	24	6	3	15	40	76	−36	21	
11	Corinthians	24	5	2	17	39	71	−32	17	
12	Colby (R)	24	5	2	17	33	73	−40	17	Relegation to Isle of Man League Division 2
13	Ayre United (R)	24	4	2	18	42	75	−33	14	Relegation to Isle of Man League Division 2

Updated to match(es) played on April 2009. Source:
Rules for classification: 1) points; 2) goal difference; 3) number of goals scored.
(C) Champions; (R) Relegated

=== Division 2 ===
Pos	Team	Pld	W	D	L	GF	GA	GD	Pts	Promotion
1	St Johns United (C, P)	26	24	1	1	133	27	+106	73	Promotion to Isle of Man League Premier Division
2	Castletown Metropolitan (P)	26	23	1	2	141	32	+109	70	Promotion to Isle of Man League Premier Division
3	Pulrose United	26	20	2	4	123	43	+80	62	
4	Marown	26	19	0	7	110	53	+57	57	
5	Ramsey YCOB	26	14	4	8	95	65	+30	46	
6	Braddan	26	14	1	11	82	72	+10	43	
7	Douglas Royal	26	12	3	11	94	79	+15	39	
8	Malew	26	11	4	11	75	70	+5	37	
9	Onchan	26	8	4	14	79	94	−15	28	
10	Douglas and District	26	7	1	18	51	117	−66	22	
11	Foxdale	26	5	4	17	58	99	−41	19	
12	Police	26	5	2	19	50	136	−86	17	
13	Northern Athletic	26	3	1	22	29	108	−79	10	Club folded
14	Ronaldsway	26	1	4	21	47	172	−125	7	

Updated to match(es) played on April 2009. Source: .
Rules for classification: 1) points; 2) goal difference; 3) number of goals scored.
(C) Champions; (P) Promoted

== Cups ==
Cup results for 2008–09:

=== FA Cup ===
Douglas HSOB 1–1 (3–2 on pens.) St Georges

=== Railway Cup ===
Peel 0–1 Rushen United

=== Hospital Cup ===
St Georges 2–1 Laxey

=== Woods Cup ===
Douglas Royal 1–0 Pulrose United

=== Paul Henry Gold Cup ===
Castletown Metropolitan 4–0 Marown

=== Cowell Cup (U19) ===
Castletown Metropolitan 3–1 St Johns United
