= 2019–20 Isle of Man Football League =

Isle of Man Football League
- Season: 2019–20

The 2019–20 Isle of Man League was the 111th season of the Isle of Man Football League on the Isle of Man. St Marys were the defending champions.

== Promotion and relegation following the 2018–19 season ==
=== From the Premier League ===
Relegated to Division 2

- St Johns United
- Braddan

=== From Division Two ===
Promoted to the Premier League

- Ramsey
- Pulrose United

== Premier League ==
Location of the clubs in the 2019–20 Isle of Man Premier League

=== Teams ===
Team	Location	Stadium	Capacity
Corinthians	Douglas	Ballafletcher Sports Ground	
Douglas Athletic	Douglas	Groves Road Stadium	
Douglas HSOB	Onchan	Blackberry Lane	
Douglas Royal	Douglas	Ballafletcher Sports Ground	
Laxey	Laxey	Laxey Football Ground	1,000
Marown	Crosby	Memorial Playing Fields	
Peel	Peel	Peel A.F.C Football Ground	
Pulrose United	Douglas	Groves Road Stadium	
Ramsey	Ramsey	Ballacloan Stadium	3,000
Rushen United	Port Erin	Croit Lowey	1,500
St Georges	Douglas	The Campsite	
St Marys	Douglas	The Bowl	3,000

=== League table ===
Pos	Team	Pld	W	D	L	GF	GA	GD	Pts
1	St Marys	3	3	0	0	20	0	+20	9
2	Laxey	3	3	0	0	17	1	+16	9
3	St Georges	3	3	0	0	11	3	+8	9
4	Rushen United	2	2	0	0	12	1	+11	6
5	Peel	2	2	0	0	11	1	+10	6
6	Douglas Athletic	3	1	1	1	12	19	−7	4
7	Corinthians	2	1	0	1	12	5	+7	3
8	Douglas HSOB	4	0	1	3	7	22	−15	1
9	Douglas Royal	1	0	0	1	1	6	−5	0
10	Pulrose United	3	0	0	3	4	19	−15	0
11	Marown	3	0	0	3	1	16	−15	0
12	Ramsey	3	0	0	3	0	15	−15	0

Updated to match(es) played on 3 October 2019. Source: fulltime-league.thefa.com
Rules for classification: 1) points; 2) goal difference; 3) number of goals scored.

== Division Two ==
Location of the clubs in the 2019–20 Isle of Man Division Two

=== Teams ===
Team	Location	Stadium	Capacity
Ayre United	Andreas	Andreas Playing Fields	
Braddan	Douglas	Cronkbourne Football Ground	
Colby	Colby	Station Fields	
Douglas and District	Douglas	Nobles Park	
Foxdale	Foxdale	Billy Goat Park	
Governors Athletic	Douglas	Bemahague School 3G Pitch	
Gymnasium	Douglas	Tromode Park	
Malew	Ballasalla	Malew Football Ground	
Michael United	Kirk Michael	Lough Ny Magher	
Onchan	Onchan	Nivison Stadium	
Ramsey YCOB	Ramsey	Scoill Ree Gorree	
St Johns United	St John's	St John's Football Ground	
Union Mills	Union Mills	Garey Mooar	

=== League table ===
Pos	Team	Pld	W	D	L	GF	GA	GD	Pts
1	Foxdale	4	3	1	0	23	4	+19	10
2	Braddan	4	3	1	0	11	6	+5	10
3	Union Mills	4	3	0	1	26	6	+20	9
4	St Johns United	4	3	0	1	12	8	+4	9
5	Ayre United	3	2	0	1	16	6	+10	6
6	Ramsey YCOB	4	2	0	2	12	12	0	6
7	Onchan	3	2	0	1	8	13	−5	6
8	Malew	4	1	1	2	6	19	−13	4
9	Colby	3	1	0	2	16	6	+10	3
10	Governors Athletic	4	1	0	3	8	36	−28	3
11	Douglas and District	4	0	2	2	4	12	−8	2
12	Michael United	3	0	1	2	5	11	−6	1
13	Gymnasium	4	0	0	4	8	16	−8	0

Updated to match(es) played on 3 October 2019. Source: fulltime-league.thefa.com
Rules for classification: 1) points; 2) goal difference; 3) number of goals scored.
