= 2011–12 Isle of Man League =

Isle of Man Football League
- Season: 2011–12

The 2011–12 Isle of Man League is the 103rd season of the Isle of Man Football League on the Isle of Man.

== League tables ==
=== Premier League ===
Pos	Team	Pld	W	D	L	GF	GA	GD	Pts	Relegation
1	St Georges (C)	24	23	1	0	130	16	+114	70	
2	St Marys	24	19	1	4	88	38	+50	58	
3	Laxey	24	19	0	5	90	38	+52	57	
4	Douglas HSOB	24	14	4	6	78	36	+42	46	
5	Rushen United	24	12	5	7	92	48	+44	41	
6	Peel	24	11	5	8	73	50	+23	38	
7	St Johns United	24	10	6	8	62	56	+6	36	
8	Corinthians	24	10	2	12	53	65	−12	32	
9	Ramsey	24	6	6	12	55	55	0	24	
10	Castletown Metropolitan	24	6	1	17	48	96	−48	19	
11	Gymnasium	24	5	1	18	39	120	−81	16	
12	Ramsey YCOB (R)	24	3	2	19	29	93	−64	11	Relegation to Isle of Man Football League Division 2
13	Ayre United (R)	24	1	0	23	25	151	−126	3	Relegation to Isle of Man Football League Division 2

Updated to match(es) played on 24 May 2012. Source: .
Rules for classification: 1) points; 2) goal difference; 3) number of goals scored.
(C) Champions; (R) Relegated

=== Division 2 ===
Pos	Team	Pld	W	D	L	GF	GA	GD	Pts	Promotion
1	Union Mills (C, P)	24	21	0	3	112	23	+89	63	Promotion to Isle of Man Football League Premier Division
2	Marown (P)	24	20	1	3	102	24	+78	61	Promotion to Isle of Man Football League Premier Division
3	Onchan	24	16	2	6	63	49	+14	50	
4	Foxdale	24	14	2	8	76	42	+34	44	
5	Michael United	24	14	1	9	59	41	+18	43	
6	Douglas Royal	24	12	5	7	55	42	+13	41	
7	Colby	24	8	7	9	51	57	−6	31	
8	Pulrose United	24	9	3	12	45	61	−16	30	
9	Braddan	24	8	2	14	46	76	−30	26	
10	Police	24	6	4	14	51	72	−21	22	
11	Douglas and District	24	6	2	16	42	86	−44	20	
12	Malew	24	3	3	18	34	95	−61	12	
13	Ronaldsway	24	2	2	20	27	95	−68	8	

Updated to match(es) played on 15 May 2012. Source: .
Rules for classification: 1) points; 2) goal difference; 3) number of goals scored.
(C) Champions; (P) Promoted

== Cups ==
=== FA Cup ===
St Georges 7–3 Union Mills

=== Railway Cup ===
St Georges 1–0 St Marys

=== Charity Shield ===
St Georges 8–1 Rushen United

=== Hospital Cup ===
St Georges 3–2 Peel

=== Woods Cup ===
Union Mills 3–1 Douglas Royal
