= 2010–11 Isle of Man League =

Isle of Man Football League
- Season: 2010–11

The 2010–11 Isle of Man League was the 102nd season of the Isle of Man Football League on the Isle of Man.

== League tables ==
=== Premier League ===
Pos	Team	Pld	W	D	L	GF	GA	GD	Pts	Relegation
1	St Georges (C)	24	22	2	0	126	10	+116	68	
2	Douglas HSOB	24	19	3	2	79	23	+56	60	
3	Peel	24	17	3	4	113	36	+77	54	
4	Laxey	24	15	3	6	79	33	+46	48	
5	St Marys	24	13	2	9	74	40	+34	41	
6	Rushen United	24	13	2	9	54	36	+18	41	
7	Ramsey	24	9	6	9	52	53	−1	33	
8	Corinthians	24	7	5	12	47	55	−8	26	
9	Ayre United	24	6	5	13	44	69	−25	23	
10	Castletown Metropolitan	24	4	6	14	35	81	−46	18	
11	Gymnasium	24	5	1	18	47	73	−26	16	
12	Michael United (R)	24	4	1	19	28	94	−66	13	Relegation to Isle of Man Football League Division 2
13	Douglas Royal (R)	24	2	1	21	29	139	−110	7	Relegation to Isle of Man Football League Division 2

Updated to match(es) played on April 2011. Source: .
Rules for classification: 1) points; 2) goal difference; 3) number of goals scored.
(C) Champions; (R) Relegated

=== Division 2 ===
Pos	Team	Pld	W	D	L	GF	GA	GD	Pts	Promotion
1	St Johns United (C, P)	24	24	0	0	194	17	+177	72	Promotion to Isle of Man Football League Premier Division
2	Ramsey YCOB (P)	24	17	1	6	71	42	+29	52	Promotion to Isle of Man Football League Premier Division
3	Union Mills	24	16	1	7	77	37	+40	49	
4	Colby	24	14	1	9	75	54	+21	43	
5	Pulrose United	24	13	4	7	59	46	+13	43	
6	Police	24	12	4	8	72	80	−8	40	
7	Braddan	24	11	2	11	71	74	−3	35	
8	Onchan	24	10	3	11	56	46	+10	33	
9	Marown	24	9	2	13	62	72	−10	29	
10	Douglas and District	24	6	1	17	46	87	−41	19	
11	Foxdale	24	5	2	17	41	80	−39	17	
12	Malew	24	5	2	17	38	132	−94	17	
13	Ronaldsway	24	2	1	21	27	122	−95	7	

Updated to match(es) played on April 2011. Source: .
Rules for classification: 1) points; 2) goal difference; 3) number of goals scored.
(C) Champions; (P) Promoted

== Cups ==
=== FA Cup ===
Laxey 5–0 Pulrose United

=== Railway Cup ===
Laxey 1–0 St Georges

=== Charity Shield ===
Laxey 3–1 St Georges

=== Hospital Cup ===
Laxey 1–0 St Georges

=== Woods Cup ===
Union Mills 3–1 Colby

=== Paul Henry Gold Cup ===
Colby 0–4 Union Mills

=== Junior Cup ===
Laxey 6–3 Peel

=== Cowell Cup (U19) ===
St Georges bt Douglas HS Old Boys
