= 2005–06 Isle of Man League =

Isle of Man Football League
- Season: 2005–06

Laxey completed the 'Grand Slam' of Manx football this season by winning the league championship, FA Cup, Railway Cup and Hospital Cup.

The Manx National team won the FA National League System Cup, allowing them to compete in the 2007 UEFA Regions' Cup.

== League tables ==
=== Division 1 ===
Pos	Team	Pld	W	D	L	GF	GA	GD	Pts
1	Laxey	24	20	4	0	103	15	+88	64
2	St Georges	24	18	1	5	87	29	+58	55
3	Peel	24	17	3	4	73	32	+41	54
4	St Marys	24	15	4	5	72	33	+39	49
5	St Johns United	24	11	3	10	53	52	+1	36
6	Douglas Royal	24	10	3	11	39	56	−17	33
7	Gymnasium	24	9	2	13	56	75	−19	29
8	Rushen United	24	8	3	13	44	47	−3	27
9	Ramsey	24	8	2	14	48	64	−16	26
10	Ayre United	24	8	1	15	50	80	−30	25
11	Marown	24	7	3	14	50	88	−38	24
12	Douglas HS Old Boys	24	6	5	13	42	66	−24	23
13	Castletown Metropolitan	24	1	2	21	19	99	−80	5

=== Division 2 ===
Pos	Team	Pld	W	D	L	GF	GA	GD	Pts
1	Union Mills	26	22	1	3	137	29	+108	67
2	Braddan	26	18	5	3	96	35	+61	59
3	Police	26	18	2	6	82	50	+32	56
4	Colby	26	17	2	7	87	35	+52	53
5	Michael United	26	15	2	9	82	51	+31	47
6	Pulrose United	25	13	5	7	97	60	+37	44
7	Corinthians	26	13	5	8	81	53	+28	44
8	Onchan	26	14	2	10	90	66	+24	44
9	Foxdale	26	11	2	13	63	67	−4	35
10	Ramsey Youth COB	25	6	3	16	55	126	−71	21
11	Douglas & District	26	6	1	19	48	112	−64	19
12	Malew	26	5	0	21	44	92	−48	15
13	Ronaldsway	26	4	1	21	50	138	−88	13
14	Jurby	26	3	1	22	39	137	−98	10

== Cups ==
=== FA Cup ===
Laxey 5–0 Pulrose United

=== Railway Cup ===
Laxey 1–0 St Georges

=== Charity Shield ===
Laxey 3–1 St Georges

=== Hospital Cup ===
Laxey 1–0 St Georges

=== Woods Cup ===
Union Mills 3–1 Colby

=== Paul Henry Gold Cup ===
Colby 0–4 Union Mills

=== Junior Cup ===
Laxey 6–3 Peel

=== Cowell Cup (U19) ===
St Georges bt Douglas HS Old Boys
