= 2004–05 Isle of Man League =

Isle of Man Football League
- Season: 2004–05

The final league standings of the two Isle of Man Football League tables; As well as the results of the domestic cup competitions for the 2004–05 season.

== League tables ==
=== Division 1 ===
Pos	Team	Pld	W	D	L	GF	GA	GD	Pts
1	St Georges	23	19	2	2	87	27	+60	59
2	Laxey	24	17	4	3	73	22	+51	55
3	Ayre United	24	17	1	6	80	45	+35	52
4	St Marys	24	15	3	6	106	42	+64	48
5	Peel	24	13	4	7	62	27	+35	43
6	Ramsey	23	9	6	8	45	49	−4	33
7	Marown	24	9	4	11	52	65	−13	31
8	Rushen United	24	8	5	11	44	61	−17	29
9	Douglas HS Old Boys	24	6	8	10	41	69	−28	26
10	Douglas Royal	24	7	2	15	35	71	−36	23
11	Metropolitan	24	6	2	16	28	64	−36	20
12	Colby	24	2	7	15	35	65	−30	13
13	Pulrose United	24	3	0	21	29	111	−82	9

=== Division 2 ===
Pos	Team	Pld	W	D	L	GF	GA	GD	Pts
1	St Johns United	26	20	4	2	126	29	+97	64
2	Gymnasium	26	20	3	3	95	39	+56	63
3	Corinthians	26	18	3	5	100	51	+49	57
4	Union Mills	26	16	4	6	97	40	+57	52
5	Police	26	16	3	7	74	36	+38	51
6	Braddan	26	16	2	8	76	37	+39	50
7	Michael United	26	13	2	11	66	49	+17	41
8	Onchan	26	12	3	11	53	61	−8	39
9	Ramsey Youth COB	26	10	3	13	54	79	−25	33
10	Foxdale	26	9	2	15	54	84	−30	29
11	Ronaldsway	26	5	1	20	44	98	−54	16
12	Douglas &District	26	4	3	19	43	84	−41	15
13	Malew	26	4	3	19	43	122	−79	15
14	Jurby	26	0	2	24	24	140	−116	2

== Cups ==
=== FA Cup ===
Laxey 0–3 St Georges

=== Railway Cup ===
Marown 0–6 St Georges

=== Charity Shield ===
St Georges 0–0 Laxey 4–5 on penalties

=== Hospital Cup ===
St Georges 2–3 Douglas Royal

=== Woods Cup ===
Corinthians 4–1 Police

=== Paul Henry Gold Cup ===
Union Mills 0–4 St Johns United

=== Junior Cup ===
Laxey 3–1 St Marys

=== Cowell Cup (U19) ===
Douglas HSOB 3–0 Peel
