= 2012–13 Isle of Man League =

Isle of Man Football League
- Season: 2012–13

The 2012–13 Isle of Man League is the 104th season of the Isle of Man Football League on the Isle of Man.

== League tables ==
=== Premier League ===
Pos	Team	Pld	W	D	L	GF	GA	GD	Pts	Qualification or relegation
1	St Georges (C)	24	21	2	1	120	16	+104	65	
2	Laxey	24	16	4	4	81	38	+43	52	
3	Douglas HSOB	24	16	2	6	73	36	+37	50	
4	St Marys	24	15	3	6	84	34	+50	48	
5	Rushen United	24	13	3	8	73	45	+28	42	
6	St Johns United	24	13	3	8	61	47	+14	42	
7	Peel	24	10	8	6	78	54	+24	38	
8	Corinthians	24	9	3	12	43	54	−11	30	
9	Ramsey	24	7	2	15	45	70	−25	23	
10	Union Mills	24	5	4	15	40	81	−41	19	
11	Castletown Metropolitan	24	5	3	16	30	102	−72	18	
12	Gymnasium (R)	24	3	4	17	27	90	−63	13	Relegation to Isle of Man Football League Division 2
13	Marown (R)	24	2	1	21	17	105	−88	7	Relegation to Isle of Man Football League Division 2

Updated to match(es) played on 16 February 2014. Source: .
Rules for classification: 1) points; 2) goal difference; 3) number of goals scored.
(C) Champions; (R) Relegated

=== Division 2 ===
Pos	Team	Pld	W	D	L	GF	GA	GD	Pts	Promotion
1	Michael United (C, P)	24	17	4	3	98	38	+60	55	Promotion to Isle of Man Football League Premier Division
2	Ramsey YCOB (P)	24	17	4	3	69	24	+45	55	Promotion to Isle of Man Football League Premier Division
3	Colby	24	17	4	3	59	24	+35	55	
4	Ayre United	24	14	5	5	80	42	+38	47	
5	Douglas Royal	24	13	5	6	84	46	+38	44	
6	Braddan	24	11	2	11	49	62	−13	35	
7	Onchan	24	9	1	14	47	73	−26	28	
8	Pulrose United	24	8	3	13	52	70	−18	27	
9	Foxdale	24	8	2	14	64	73	−9	26	
10	Douglas and District	24	8	1	15	44	70	−26	25	
11	Malew	24	5	3	16	38	89	−51	18	
12	Ronaldsway	24	5	2	17	40	84	−44	17	
13	Douglas Athletic	24	4	4	16	36	65	−29	16	

Updated to match(es) played on 16 February 2014. Source: .
Rules for classification: 1) points; 2) goal difference; 3) number of goals scored.
(C) Champions; (P) Promoted

== Cups ==
=== FA Cup ===
St Marys 2–1 St Georges

=== Railway Cup ===
St Georges 4–2 St Johns United

=== Charity Shield ===
St Georges 2–1 St Marys

=== Hospital Cup ===
St Georges 9–0 Union Mills

=== Woods Cup ===
Ayre United 7–1 Pulrose United
