= 2007–08 Isle of Man League =

Isle of Man Football League
- Season: 2007–08

The Isle of Man League 2007–08 (known as the Sure Mobile Premier League for sponsorship reasons) was the ninety-ninth such league competition on the Isle of Man.

Football in the Isle of Man is played at an amateur level. There are two tiers of men's football, consisting of 27 clubs. There are six senior cup competitions – the Manx FA Cup, Railway Cup, Hospital Cup, Woods Cup, Paul Henry Gold Cup and the Charity Shield. Each club has a reserve team in the Isle of Man Football Combination, and the Junior Cup for the reserve teams. There is also the Cowell Cup an annual Under-19 tournament.

The Isle of Man League team advanced to the semi-finals of the National League Systems Cup 2007–08, after defeating Wearside League 2–1 in the second round, and defeating Liverpool County Premier League 1–0 in the third round. The semi-final match ended in a draw with Midland Football Combination (Div 1), who advanced to the finals after winning 4–1 in a penalty shootout.

There is one tier of women's football. The Isle of Man national football team is not affiliated with UEFA or FIFA.

== Men ==
=== League tables ===
St Georges were crowned champions in the Premier League, the top tier of Manx amateur football, whilst St Johns United and Douglas Royal were relegated from the Premier League. The league was renamed from Division One in 2007.

Due to sponsorship, Division 2 was known as the CFS Division 2.

==== Premier League ====
Saint Georges F.C. won their tenth league title, second consecutive title, and fourth in five years.

Pos	Team	Pld	W	D	L	GF	GA	GD	Pts
1	St Georges (C)	24	23	0	1	115	24	+91	69
2	Peel	24	19	1	4	76	24	+52	58
3	Douglas HS Old Boys	24	14	3	7	57	46	+11	45
4	Laxey	24	13	4	7	62	51	+11	43
5	Union Mills	24	10	6	8	52	48	+4	36
6	Rushen United	24	9	7	8	48	47	+1	34
7	Gymnasium	24	9	4	11	51	58	−7	31
8	Corinthians	24	9	1	14	62	67	−5	28
9	St Marys	24	9	4	11	56	62	−6	31
10	Ramsey	24	6	5	13	33	53	−20	23
11	Ayre United	24	5	6	13	36	65	−29	21
12	St Johns United	24	3	5	16	31	77	−46	14
13	Douglas Royal	24	3	2	19	38	95	−57	11

(C) Champions

==== Division Two ====
Colby F.C., from the south of the Isle, completed an unbeaten season.

Pos	Team	Pld	W	D	L	GF	GA	GD	Pts
1	Colby	26	25	1	0	153	21	+132	76
2	Michael United	26	19	4	3	135	32	+103	61
3	Pulrose United	26	18	6	2	97	25	+72	60
4	Castletown Metropolitan	26	17	4	5	104	38	+66	55
5	Marown	26	13	3	10	61	56	+5	42
6	Police	26	12	4	10	74	64	+10	40
7	Onchan	26	12	3	11	83	70	+13	39
8	Malew	26	10	5	11	51	69	−18	35
9	Braddan	26	10	3	13	63	73	−10	33
10	Douglas & District	26	7	3	16	64	106	−42	24
11	Ronaldsway	26	6	4	16	44	105	−61	22
12	Foxdale	26	5	3	18	36	89	−53	18
13	Ramsey Youth COB	26	3	1	22	30	134	−104	10
14	Jurby	26	3	0	23	28	141	−113	9

=== Cups ===
==== FA Cup ====
Peel 0–5 St Georges

- St Georges completed the domestic treble with this victory, but missed out on the Railway Cup and chance for a quadruple.

==== Railway Cup ====
Peel 4–3 St Georges

- The Railway Cup provided some consolation to Peel after finishing runners-up in the Premier League and FA Cup.

==== Hospital Cup ====
Corinthians 0–2 St Georges

==== Woods Cup ====
Braddan 0–2 Colby

==== Paul Henry Gold Cup ====
Castletown Metropolitan 0–3 Michael United

==== Junior Cup ====
Peel 2–0 Rushen United

==== Cowell Cup (U19) ====
St Georges 2–3 St Marys

== Women ==
=== League table ===
Pos	Team	Pld	W	D	L	GF	GA	GD	Pts
1	Douglas Royal	18	16	1	1	207	16	+191	49
2	Corinthians	18	15	1	2	130	17	+113	46
3	Rushen United	18	14	1	3	133	20	+113	43
4	Gymnasium	18	11	0	7	66	44	+22	33
5	Colby	18	9	1	8	39	83	−44	28
6	Castletown	18	8	1	9	44	76	−32	25
7	Peel	18	6	2	10	34	52	−18	20
8	Laxey	18	4	2	12	36	141	−105	14
9	Ramsey	18	1	2	15	15	129	−114	5
10	Michael United	18	0	1	17	3	129	−126	1
