= Isle of Man Railway Cup =

- Organising body: Isle of Man FA
- Founded: 1905; 120 years ago
- Region: Isle of Man
- Current champions: Ayre United (2nd title)
- Most successful club(s): Peel (22 titles)

The Isle of Man Railway Cup, also known as the Plum Properties Railway Cup for sponsorship reasons, is an association football tournament held for the top four clubs from the Isle of Man Premier League, the top flight in Isle of Man football. The tournament is held annually, traditionally on Boxing Day, where the top four sides of the league table at that time compete for the trophy. The tournament has been running since 1905 and is overseen by the Isle of Man Football Association.

In 2011, the trophy was sent to Sheffield Silverware in England for repairs. The Isle of Man FA Chief Executive Frank Stennett said that this was because "Over the course of time it has picked up a few knocks and bumps."

== Final ==
This section lists every final of the competition played since 1893, the winners, the runners-up, and the result.

=== Key ===
Match went to a replay
Match went to extra time
Match decided by a penalty shootout after extra time
Shared trophy

Season	Winners	Result	Runner-up	Notes
1905–06	Gymnasium	awd	Ramsey	Awarded to Gymnasium. (Note: The final was to be played on Saturday, while Ramsey had home games on Thurdsay and objected the scheduling. In the end, The Association awarded the win to Gymnasium.)
1906–07	Gymnasium	2–2	Castletown	Original final.
1906–07	Gymnasium	1–0	Castletown	Replay.
1907–08	Port St Mary	2–1	Wanderers	
1908–09	Wanderers	1–0	Castletown	
1909–10	Ramsey	0–0	Gymnasium	Original final.
1909–10	Ramsey	5–0	Gymnasium	Replay.
1910–11	Ramsey	2–0	Wanderers	
1911–12	Castletown	3–0	Old Douglas	
1912–13	Ramsey	3–0	Peel	
1913–14	Ramsey	1–1	Gymnasium	Original final.
1913–14	Ramsey	3–2	Gymnasium	Replay.
1914–1919	No competition due to World War I.			
1919–20	Wanderers	2–1	Ramsey	
1920–21	Castletown	2–0	St Georges	
1921–22	Rushen United	3–2	St Georges	
1922–23	Rushen United	4–1	Castletown	
1923–24	Castletown	3–3	Ramsey	Original final.
1923–24	Castletown	1–0	Ramsey	Replay.
1924–25	Gymnasium	2–1	Rushen United	
1925–26	Ramsey	2–1	Peel	
1926–27	Ramsey	2–1	Castletown	
1927–28	Gymnasium	3–1	Wanderers	
1928–29	Wanderers	3–1	Gymnasium	
1929–30	Laxey	2–1	Ramsey	
1930–31	Braddan	2–0	Gymnasium	
1931–32	Braddan	4–2	Ramsey	
1932–33	Peel	7–0	Ramsey	
1933–34	Ramsey	4–4	Laxey	Original final.
1933–34	Ramsey	3–3	Laxey	Replay.
1933–34	Ramsey	1–0	Laxey	Second replay.
1934–35	Ramsey	2–0	Laxey	
1935–36	Ramsey	1–0	Braddan	
1936–37	Peel	2–1	Laxey	
1937–38	Braddan	3–0	Peel	
1938–39	Onchan	2–1	Braddan	
1939–1946	No competition due to World War II.			
1946–47	Peel	7–3	Ramsey	
1947–48	Rushen United	3–0	St Georges	
1948–49	Ramsey	3–1	Peel	
1949–50	Castletown	4–2	Laxey	
1950–51	Gymnasium	4–2	St Marys	
1951–52	Douglas High School Old Boys	3–1	Peel	
1952–53	Pulrose United	3–0	Castletown	
1953–54	St Georges	4–3	Peel	
1954–55	Peel	4–0	RAF Jurby	
1955–56	St Georges	4–0	Douglas High School Old Boys	
1956–57	Peel	1–1	St Georges	Original final.
1956–57	Peel	3–0	St Georges	Replay.
1957–58	Ramsey	4–1	St Georges	
1958–59	Ramsey	8–0	Laxey	
1959–60	Castletown	3–2	Peel	
1960–61	Peel	2–1	Rushen United	
1961–62	Peel	5–1	Rushen United	
1962–63	Rushen United	2–1	St Georges	
1963–64	Rushen United	6–1	Peel	
1964–65	Douglas High School Old Boys	4–2	Rushen United	
1965–66	Peel	2–0	Douglas High School Old Boys	
1966–67	Douglas High School Old Boys			
1967–68	Douglas High School Old Boys	1–0	Peel	
1968–69	Peel	4–2	Pulrose United	
1969–70	Peel	2–1	Douglas High School Old Boys	
1970–71	Peel	1–0	Pulrose United	
1971–72	Peel	4–0	Castletown	
1972–73	Peel	6–4	Rushen United	
1973–74	Peel	2–1	Douglas High School Old Boys	
1974–75	Rushen United	5–1	Peel	
1975–76	Rushen United	2–0	Peel	Match abandoned.
1975–76	Rushen United	5–2	Peel	After extra-time.
1976–77	Castletown	1–0	Rushen United	
1977–78	Rushen United	1–0	Peel	
1978–79	Rushen United	3–2	Ramsey	
1979–80	Rushen United	2–2	Ramsey	Original final.
1979–80	Rushen United	3–0	Ramsey	Replay.
1980–81	Peel	4–1	Rushen United	
1981–82	Peel	4–0	Douglas High School Old Boys	
1982–83	Rushen United	2–2	Ramsey	Original final.
1982–83	Rushen United	3–0	Ramsey	Replay.
1983–84	Rushen United	1–0	Douglas High School Old Boys	
1984–85	Castletown	5–2	Rushen United	
1985–86	Gymnasium	2–2	Rushen United	Original final.
1985–86	Gymnasium	2–1	Rushen United	Replay.
1986–87	Gymnasium	4–1	Rushen United	
1987–88	Rushen United	4–2	Douglas High School Old Boys	
1988–89	Douglas High School Old Boys	1–1	Rushen United	Original final.
1988–89	Douglas High School Old Boys	5–0	Rushen United	Replay.
1989–90	St Georges	2–1	Rushen United	
1990–91	St Georges	3–1	Rushen United	
1991–92	Douglas High School Old Boys	2–1	Gymnasium	
1992–93	Pulrose United	5–0	St Marys	
1993–94	Douglas High School Old Boys	2–2	Pulrose United	Original final.
1993–94	Douglas High School Old Boys	2–1	Pulrose United	Replay.
1994–95	St Marys	3–0	St Marys	
1995–96	Douglas High School Old Boys	1–0	Rushen United	
1996–97	St Marys	2–0	Rushen United	
1997–98	St Marys	3–1	Douglas High School Old Boys	
1998–99	Peel	2–0	St Marys	
1999–2000	Douglas High School Old Boys	0–0	Peel	Won 9–8 on penalties. After extra-time.
2000–01	St Marys	3–0	Peel	
2001–02	Rushen United	3–1	Marown	
2002–03	Peel	4–2	St Marys	
2003–04	Laxey	3–2	St Marys	
2004–05	St Georges	6–0	Marown	
2005–06	Laxey	1–0	St Georges	
2006–07	Peel	1–0	Laxey	
2007–08	Peel	4–3	St Georges	
2008–09	Rushen United	1–0	Peel	
2009–10	Peel	2–0	Rushen United	
2010–11	St Georges	5–1	Peel	
2011–12	St Georges	1–0	St Marys	
2012–13	St Georges	4–2	St Johns United	
2013–14	St Georges	7–1	Rushen United	
2014–15	St Georges	5–2	Douglas High School Old Boys	
2015–16	St Georges	5–1	Peel	
2016–17	St Georges	5–2	St Marys	
2017–18	Corinthians	4–0	St Georges	
2018–19	Peel	3–2	St Georges	
2019–20	Not held due to COVID-19 pandemic.			
2020–21	Corinthians	1–0	Rushen United	
2021–22	Ayre United	2–1	St Georges	
2022–23	Corinthians	1–0	Peel	
2023–24	Ayre United	3–2	Peel	

=== Wins by teams ===
Club	Wins	First final won	Last final won	Runner-up	Last final lost	Total final apps.	Notes
Peel	22	1932–33	2018–19	19	2023–24	41	
Rushen United	15	1921–22	2008–09	18	2020–21	33	
St Georges	12	1953–54	2016–17	11	2021–22	23	
Ramsey	12	1909–10	1958–59	10	1982–83	22	
Douglas High School Old Boys	9	1951–52	1999–2000	9	2014–15	18	
Castletown	7	1911–12	1984–85	6	1971–72	13	
Gymnasium	7	1905–06	1986–87	5	1991–92	12	
St Marys	4	1994–95	2000–01	8	2016–17	12	
Laxey	3	1929–30	2005–06	6	2006–07	9	
Wanderers	3	1908–09	1928–29	3	1927–28	6	
Braddan	3	1930–31	1937–38	2	1938–39	5	
Corinthians	3	2017–18	2022–23	0	–	3	
Pulrose United	2	1952–53	1992–93	3	1993–94	5	
Ayre United	2	2021–22	2023–24	0	–	2	
Port St Mary	1	1907–08	1907–08	0	–	1	
Onchan	1	1938–39	1938–39	0	–	1	

=== Finals by teams ===
Club	Played	Won	Draw	Lost	GF	GA	GD	Win %
Peel	41	22	0	19	91	79	+12	53.66
Rushen United	33	15	0	18	64	71	−7	45.45
St Georges	23	12	0	11	61	45	+16	52.17
Ramsey	22	12	0	10	45	38	+7	54.55
Douglas High School Old Boys	18	9	0	9	25	32	−7	50.00
Castletown	13	7	0	6	21	21	+0	53.85
Gymnasium	12	7	0	5	20	21	−1	58.33
St Marys	12	4	0	8	19	28	−9	33.33
Laxey	9	3	0	6	9	21	−12	33.33
Wanderers	6	3	0	3	8	9	−1	50.00
Braddan	5	3	0	2	2	10	−8	60.00
Corinthians	3	3	0	0	6	0	+6	100.00
Pulrose United	5	2	0	3	3	11	−8	40.00
Ayre United	2	2	0	0	5	3	+2	100.00
Port St Mary	1	1	0	0	2	1	+1	100.00
Onchan	1	1	0	0	2	1	+1	100.00
Marown	2	0	0	2	1	9	−8	0.00
Old Douglas	1	0	0	1	0	3	−3	0.00
RAF Jurby	1	0	0	1	0	4	−4	0.00
St Johns United	1	0	0	1	2	4	−2	0.00
