= Isle of Man Football League =

- Founded: 1896; 130 years ago
- Country: Isle of Man
- Confederation: UEFA
- Divisions: Premier League Division Two
- Number of clubs: 26 (13 in each division)
- Level on pyramid: 1–2
- Relegation to: Division Two
- Domestic cup(s): Isle of Man FA Cup; Isle of Man Hospital Cup; Isle of Man Railway Cup; Paul Henry Gold Cup; Captain George Woods Memorial Cup
- Current champions: Ayre United (2nd title) (2023–24)
- Most championships: Peel (29 titles)
- Website: Results website
- Current: 2025–26 Isle of Man Football League

The Isle of Man Football League is the senior football league on the Isle of Man and is run by the Isle of Man Football Association. Although the league is affiliated with The Football Association, it does not form a part of the English football league system.

== History ==
The league's representative XI has won the FA Inter-League Cup on two occasions. In 2006 they beat the Cambridgeshire County League XI and qualified for the 2007 UEFA Regions' Cup, being eliminated in the group stage in Czech Republic. They won the Inter-League Cup again in 2013, but again were eliminated in the group stage of the Regions Cup, this time in Slovakia.

== Competition format ==
=== Competition ===
There are 26 clubs in the Isle of Man Football League which are grouped into two divisions: Premier League and Division Two. In 2024–25 these were known for sponsorship reasons as the Canada Life Premier League and the Ardern & Druggan Ltd Division Two. Each division usually has 13 clubs and in any given season a club plays each of the others in the same division twice (a double round-robin system), once at their home and once at that of their opponents. This makes for a total of 24 games played each season. Clubs gain three points for a win, one for a draw and none for a defeat. Clubs are ranked by total points, then goal difference, and then goals scored.

=== Promotion and relegation ===
At the end of each season the two lowest placed clubs in the Premier League are relegated to Division Two, and the top two placed clubs in Division Two are promoted to the Premier League. Each club has a second team in either Combination Division One or Combination Division Two. Promotion and relegation within the combination league is decided by the movement of each club's first team.

== Member clubs ==
The league lined up with the following clubs for the 2024–25 season.

=== Premier League ===
- Ayre United
- Corinthians
- Foxdale
- Laxey
- Marown (relegated)
- Onchan
- Peel
- Ramsey
- Rushen United
- St Johns United
- St Georges (relegated)
- St Marys
- Union Mills

=== Division Two ===
(11 clubs)

- Braddan (promoted)
- Castletown Metropolitan
- Colby
- Douglas and District
- Douglas HSOB (promoted)
- Douglas Royal
- Governors Athletic
- Malew
- Michael United
- Pulrose United
- Ramsey YCOB

(Douglas Athletic and Gymnasium withdrew from Division Two.)

Location of the clubs in the 2023–24 Isle of Man Premier League	Location of the clubs in the 2023–24 Isle of Man Division Two

=== Defunct clubs ===
- Douglas Wanderers
- Northern Athletic A.F.C. (withdrew from season 2010–11)
- Ronaldsway A.F.C. (withdrew from season 2014–15)

== Past league winners ==
=== 1896–2007 ===
No.	Season	Division One Champions	Division Two Champions
1	1896–97	Peel	
2	1897–98	Gymnasium	
3	1898–99	Ramsey	
4	1899–1900	Ramsey	
5	1900–01	Ramsey	
6	1901–02	Ramsey	
7	1902–03	Gymnasium	
8	1903–04	Gymnasium	
9	1904–05	Gymnasium	
10	1905–06	Gymnasium	
11	1906–07	Peel	
12	1907–08	Ramsey	
13	1908–09	Douglas Wanderers	
14	1909–10	Douglas Wanderers	
15	1910–11	Ramsey	
16	1911–12	Ramsey	
17	1912–13	Ramsey	
18	1913–14	Castletown Metropolitan	
–	1914–19	League suspended due to World War I	
19	1919–20	Gymnasium	
20	1920–21	Ramsey	
21	1921–22	Peel	
22	1922–23	Castletown Metropolitan	
23	1923–24	Castletown Metropolitan	
24	1924–25	Castletown Metropolitan	
25	1925–26	Rushen United	
26	1926–27	Ramsey	
27	1927–28	Colby	
28	1928–29	St Marys	
29	1929–30	Braddan	
30	1930–31	Braddan	
31	1931–32	Peel	
32	1932–33	Peel	
33	1933–34	Peel	
34	1934–35	Peel	
35	1935–36	Rushen United	
36	1936–37	Braddan	
37	1937–38	Braddan	
–	1938–46	League suspended due to World War II	
38	1946–47	Onchan	
39	1947–48	Peel	
40	1948–49	Peel	
41	1949–50	Castletown Metropolitan	
42	1950–51	Castletown Metropolitan	
43	1951–52	Ramsey	
44	1952–53	Peel	
45	1953–54	Peel	
46	1954–55	Peel	
47	1955–56	RAF Jurby	
48	1956–57	St Georges	
49	1957–58	Peel	
50	1958–59	Peel	
51	1959–60	Peel	
52	1960–61	St Georges	
53	1961–62	St Georges	
54	1962–63	Peel	
55	1963–64	Peel	
56	1964–65	Peel	Onchan
57	1965–66	Peel	Corinthians
58	1966–67	Douglas High School Old Boys	
59	1967–68	Pulrose United	
60	1968–69	Pulrose United	Ramsey YCOB
61	1969–70	Pulrose United	Laxey
62	1970–71	Pulrose United	
63	1971–72	Peel	St Georges
64	1972–73	Peel	Colby
65	1973–74	Peel	Braddan
66	1974–75	Peel	Gymnasium
67	1975–76	Peel	St Marys
68	1976–77	Peel	Ayre United
69	1977–78	Rushen United	
70	1978–79	Rushen United	Corinthians
71	1979–80	Rushen United	St Georges
72	1980–81	Rushen United	Douglas High School Old Boys
73	1981–82	Castletown Metropolitan	Gymnasium
74	1982–83	Douglas High School Old Boys	Ayre United
75	1983–84	Peel	
76	1984–85	Rushen United	
77	1985–86	Rushen United	
78	1986–87	Gymnasium	
79	1987–88	Rushen United	
80	1988–89	Douglas High School Old Boys	St Marys
81	1989–90	Douglas High School Old Boys	Corinthians
82	1990–91	Douglas High School Old Boys	St Marys
83	1991–92	St Georges	Ramsey YCOB
84	1992–93	Pulrose United	Braddan
85	1993–94	St Georges	Foxdale
86	1994–95	St Georges	Laxey
87	1995–96	St Marys	Police
88	1996–97	Douglas High School Old Boys	Peel
89	1997–98	St Marys	Marown
90	1998–99	Castletown Metropolitan	
91	1999–2000	Peel	
92	2000–01	Peel	Ayre United
93	2001–02	Peel	Colby
94	2002–03	St Marys	
95	2003–04	St Georges	Douglas Royal
96	2004–05	St Georges	St Johns United
97	2005–06	Laxey	Union Mills
98	2006–07	St Georges	Douglas High School Old Boys

=== 2007–present ===
In 2007, Division One was renamed the Premier League. Division Two remained unchanged.

No.	Season	Premier League Champions	Division Two Champions
99	2007–08	St Georges	Colby
100	2008–09	St Georges	St Johns United
101	2009–10	Rushen United	Douglas Royal
102	2010–11	St Georges	St Johns United
103	2011–12	St Georges	Union Mills
104	2012–13	St Georges	Michael United
105	2013–14	St Georges	Gymnasium
106	2014–15	St Georges	Marown
107	2015–16	St Georges	Douglas Athletic
108	2016–17	St Georges	Braddan
109	2017–18	St Georges	Marown
110	2018–19	St Marys	Ramsey
111	2019–20	Cancelled due to COVID-19	
112	2020–21	Corinthians	Union Mills
113	2021–22	Ayre United	St Johns United
114	2022–23	Peel	St Marys
115	2023–24	Ayre United	Foxdale
116	2024–25	Peel	Braddan

=== Titles by club ===
Club	Number of Top Flight Titles	First Top Flight Title Won	Last Top Flight Title Won
Peel	31	1896–97	2024-25
St Georges	19	1956–57	2017-18
Ramsey	11	1898–99	1951–52
Rushen United	10	1925–26	2009–10
Castletown Metropolitan	8	1913–14	1998–99
Gymnasium	7	1897–98	1986–87
Douglas High School Old Boys	5	1966–67	1996–97
Pulrose United	5	1967–68	1992–93
St Marys	5	1928–29	2018–19
Braddan	4	1929–30	1937–38
Douglas Wanderers	2	1908–09	1909–10
Ayre United	2	2021–22	2023–24
Colby	1	1927–28	1927–28
Corinthians	1	2020–21	2020–21
Laxey	1	2005–06	2005–06
Onchan	1	1946–47	1946–47
RAF Jurby	1	1955–56	1955–56

== See also ==
- List of association football competitions
- F.C. Isle of Man: a club playing in the English league system
