= Isle of Man Woods Memorial Cup =

The Isle of Man Woods Memorial Cup, also known as the GH Corlett Woods Memorial Cup for sponsorship reasons, or simply the Woods Cup, is an association football tournament held for football clubs competing in the Isle of Man Division 2. The tournament is held annually, with the final traditionally being played on Good Friday. It is overseen by the Isle of Man Football Association. The cup is named after Captain George Woods.
