= Governors Athletic F.C. =

Association football club on the Isle of Man

- Full name: Governors Athletic Football Club
- Nickname(s): Governors or Govs
- Founded: 2014
- Ground: Station Fields, Colby (Temporary)
- Chairman: Karl Hunter
- League: Isle of Man Football League Division Two
- 2022-23: DPS ltd Division 2 - 11th (1pt)
Home colours

Governors Athletic F.C. are a football club from the Isle of Man. They compete in the Isle of Man Football League and they wear a red and white striped kit. They currently play their home games at Station Fields in Colby.
