= Union Mills F.C. =

Association football club on the Isle of Man

Coordinates: 54.17870°N 4.50909°W

- Full name: Union Mills Football Club
- Nickname: The Millers
- Founded: 1920
- Ground: Garey Mooar; Ballaoates Road; Braddan, Isle of Man
- Capacity: 600 standing, 12 seated
- Manager: Ryan Kelly
- League: Isle of Man Football League Premier League
- 2025-26: Premier League, 9/13
Home colours	Away colours

Union Mills F.C. is a football club from Union Mills in the parish of Braddan on the Isle of Man. They compete in the Isle of Man Football League Premier League. They wear a claret and sky blue kit and play their home games at Garey Mooar.

== History ==
Union Mills were founded in 1920. They were promoted to the top flight (then the First Division) in 1983–84 and stayed in the league just two years until the 1985–86 season. They were again promoted in the 1998–99 season, but, as before, spent just two seasons in the top flight before finishing bottom in 2000–01, winning just two games all season.

Union Mills were champions of JCK Division 2 20/21 season and now complete in the top flight of Manx football the Isle of Man Canada Life Premiership. They were promoted to the top flight in the 2005–06 season after winning Division Two. That same season they reached the Woods Cup Final where they lost to Colby 1–0 after extra time. They won the Paul Henry Gold Cup, beating Braddan in the final 5–1. In the 2007–08 season the club finished fifth in the Premier League

The club has a Reserve team who compete in the Isle of Man Football Combination 2. They also have a youth system.

On 10 November 2007 former Wimbledon football Robbie Earle visited Union Mills, where he helped coach the club's Under-9's team.

Following the 2007–08 season Union Mills hosted the annual Isle of Man Football Association Awards at the Garey Mooar clubhouse on 27 June 2008.

In the 2011–12 season, Mills had their most successful run in the club's history. They won the Treble by clinching the Division 2 title, Wood's Cup beating Royals 3–1, Paul Henry Cup beating Marown 5–1, and also reached the final of the FA Cup, for the first time in the club's history, where they finished as runners up to Geordies.

In the 2012–13 season, Mills made history again by reaching the Hospital Cup final for the 1st time and ended up being runners up to St Georges. Shortly after this Derek Cowley announced plans to leave the club after 18 successful years in charge, his assistant Darren Scarffe also left the club.

On 16 June 2013 it was announced that Chris Cain would take over as being the new Union Mills manager.

Union Mills were relegated to JCK Division 2 in 2015–16.

In July 2018 Steven Fox was announced as Union Mills Manager.

Paul Guiver appointed as first team manager 12 July 2022.

== Link up with Blackpool F.C. ==
In 2008 the club linked up with English football club Blackpool as a partner club in the Seasiders Centre of Excellence which has seen Blackpool visit Union Mills and continue to work with the club, staff and players. As part of the link up Blackpool signed two players from the Isle of Man who attend the Centre of Excellence in Blackpool.

In November 2008 Blackpool staff visited Union Mills, to help train the club's coaches, and announced that they would soon be opening a Development Centre on the island.

== Facilities ==
Garey Mooar is situated in a countryside location about one mile from Braddan Bridge and Union Mills. It has a new purpose-built clubhouse with bar and clubroom. The club also has a 250 pitch campsite at Garey Mooar with breakfast and other meals available at the clubhouse. The club earlier played on playing fields alongside Noble's Hospital, Braddan. In 2001 the club agreed to move from there to allow the site to be developed by the Department of Health and Social Security (DHSS) for staff accommodation. New playing fields at Ballaoates Road were completed in 2002. In September 2004, construction began on the new clubhouse. which was built with help and funding from the Football Foundation, who in March 2004 gave the club £382,312 toward the construction of the clubhouse and to add full-sized and junior pitches for the club. Vince Watkins, Chairman of Union Mills, said at the time, "We are delighted to receive this funding as it provides a significant proportion of the money we need to carry out the plans that we have been making for some years now. The move to Ballaoates will be a major benefit to the Club, its members and the wider community."

== Honours ==
=== League ===
- Division Two (2)
  - Champions 2005–06, 2011–12
- Combination Division Two (2)
  - Champions (2): 2009–10

=== Cup ===
- Isle of Man Hospital Cup
  - Runners-up 2012–13
- Isle of Man FA Cup
  - Runners-up 2011–12
- Paul Henry Gold Cup (3)
  - Winners 2004–05, 2005–06 2011–12
- Woods Cup (4)
  - Winners 1989–90, 2002–03, 2005–06, 2011–12
