= Isle of Man Football Association =

Association football governing body of the Isle of Man

- Founded: 12 February 1890; 136 years ago
- President: A. C. (Tony) Mepham
- Website: www.isleofmanfa.com

The Isle of Man Football Association, also simply known as the Isle of Man FA or the IOMFA, is the body that co-ordinates and organises the sport of football on the Isle of Man. Although, as a Crown Dependency, the Isle of Man is not a part of the United Kingdom, the local FA is affiliated with the English FA, and acts as a County Football Association.

== History and organisation ==
The organisation runs the Isle of Man national football team (which competes in the Island Games), the Isle of Man league representative XI (which competes in the FA National League System Cup) and the Isle of Man Football League, the main league competition on the island.

In October 2008 Onchan became the eleventh IOMFA club to achieve The Football Association Charter Standard status, the FA's kitemark scheme for quality assurance. The IOMFA now has set a target of becoming the first County FA to have every associate club achieving the standard.
