= Ramsey Youth Centre and Old Boys F.C. =

Association football club on the Isle of Man

Ramsey Youth Centre and Old Boys
- Full name: Ramsey Youth Centre and Old Boys Football Club
- Nickname: The Youthie
- Founded: 1945
- Ground: Bunscoill Rhumsaa, Lezayre Road, Ramsey, Isle of Man
- Chairman: Jamie Leech
- Manager: Matty Kelly
- League: Isle of Man Football League Isle of Man Football Premier League
- 2026–27: Premier League, 26/27
Home colours	Away colours

The Ramsey Youth Centre and Old Boys F.C., or "The Youthie" is a football club based in Ramsey, Isle of Man. They currently play in Division Two. Their local rivals are Ramsey A.F.C. and Ayre United A.F.C., the other northern clubs. The Youthie is also one of the oldest Manx football clubs.

They play next to the Bunscoill Rhumsaa school on Lezayre Road. They play in a blue and black home strip with a green goalkeeper top, with a red and black away strip with a grey goalkeeper top.

After promotion from JCK Division 2 in 2026, the club play in the Premier League. The first team won silverware for the first time in 40 years lifting the Woods Cup in 2026 after beating Marown 1-0, and later that season also winning the Paul Henry Gold Cup with a 2-1 win against Castletown. The combination team is very young and finished 3rd in the Combination 2 League In 2026.

== Teams ==
Alongside the two senior teams, the club has a junior set-up with a range of teams for all young ages, including an under-6s, under 8's, under-10s, under-12s and Under 16s. The club also contests in the Cowell Cup tournament (16–21).

== Facilities ==
The team use the special built changing rooms for the club in the Bunscoill Rhumsaa school. The seniors train on a Tuesday in the Ramsey Grammar School sports hall and on a Thursday at the RGS Astro. The juniors train on a Saturday morning at the pitch 9.30-11/11;30 dependent on age.

== Honours ==
- Division Two
  - Runners-up: 2012–13, 2014-15 2025-26
- Paul Henry Gold Cup: 2025-26
- Woods Cup
  - Winners: 1985-86, 2025-26
  - Runners-up: 2014-15
