= St Marys A.F.C. =

Association football club on the Isle of Man

Coordinates: 54.151936°N 4.501382°W

St. Marys A.F.C.
- Full name: St. Marys Association Football Club
- Nickname(s): The Saints
- Founded: 1893
- Ground: The Bowl; Pulrose Road; Douglas, Isle of Man
- Capacity: 3,000
- Chairman: Josh Evans
- Manager: Alex Harrison & Frank Jones
- League: Isle of Man Football League Premier League
- 2018–19: Premier League, 1/13
Home colours	Away colours

St Marys A.F.C. is a football club from Douglas on the Isle of Man. It competes in the Isle of Man Football League wearing a yellow and green kit. It plays its home games at The Bowl in Douglas.

== History ==
Formed in 1893, the club is one of the oldest on the island. It has won the Manx FA Cup seven times. It won its first league title in 1928–29. It was the losing finalist in the Woods Cup in 1963–64.

In 1983–84, the club was relegated to Division Two, finishing in last place, winning just one league game all season. In 1988–89, it was promoted as Division Two champions, but lasted just one season before being relegated in 1989–90. In 1990–91, it was promoted again as Division Two champions, not losing a league game all season. It also won the Paul Henry Gold Cup with a 3–0 win over Colby in the final.

In the following season,the club consolidated in the top flight finishing in eighth place, and followed that up with a fourth-place finish in 1992–93, and was the losing finalist in the Railway Cup.

The club won the Manx FA Cup again in 1993–94, beating Castletown 2–0 in the final, and won again the following season with a 1–0 victory over St Georges in the final. In 1994–95, it won the Railway Cup beating St Georges 3–0 in the final. In 1995–96 the club was Isle of Man champion for the second time and won the Hospital Cup beating St Georges 1–0 in the final.

In the following season, St Marys finished third in the league, won the Railway Cup with a 2–0 victory over Rushen United and was the losing finalist in the Hospital Cup before winning the title again in 1997–98, winning all 25 games, scoring 93 goals and conceding just 14 times. It also won the Manx FA Cup again, beating Douglas High School Old Boys 3–0 in the final, and won both the Railway Cup with a 3–1 victory over Douglas High School Old Boys and the Hospital Cup beating Douglas Royal 4–1 in the final. In 1999–2000, it won the Hospital Cup again with a 1–0 win over Laxey.

In 2000–01, it finished in second place in the league, winning the Manx FA Cup beating Ayre United in the final and also winning the Railway Cup with a 3–0 victory over Peel.

In 2001–02 it finished third in the league and won both the Manx FA Cup with a 1–0 victory over Corinthians and the Hospital Cup beating St Georges 5–1 in the final. They also won the Charity Shield, beating Peel 1–0. In the following season, it was Isle of Man champion for the third time and won the Hospital Cup, beating Rushen United 1–0 in the final. It was also the losing finalist in the Railway Cup. In the 2003–04, St Marys was third in the league. It won the Manx FA Cup in 2006–07, beating Peel in the final on penalties.

The club also has a reserve team that plays in the Isle of Man Football Combination.

== Stadium ==
The club plays its home games at the 3,000 capacity The Bowl in Douglas.

== Honours ==
=== League ===
- Division One champions (5): 1928–29, 1995–96, 1997–98, 2002–03, 2018–19, 2019–20
- Division Two champions (2): 1988–89, 1990–91
- Combination One champions (1): 2018–19

=== Cup ===
- Manx FA Cup (8): 1912–13, 1993–94, 1994–95, 1997–98, 2000–01, 2001–02, 2006–07, 2012–13
- Hospital Cup (5): 1995–96, 1997–98, 1999–00, 2001–02, 2002–03
- Railway Cup (4): 1994–95, 1996–97, 1997–98, 2000–01
- Paul Henry Gold Cup (1): 1990–91
