= Colby A.F.C. =

Association football club on the Isle of Man

- Full name: Colby Association Football Club
- Nickname: The Moonlighters
- Founded: 1919
- Ground: Station Road; Colby, Isle of Man
- Capacity: 50 (seated) + standing
- Chairman: Kevin Kniveton
- Manager: Kevin Murray (Mens)
- League: Isle of Man Football League
- 2025-26: Division 2, 1st (Champions)
Home colours	Away colours

Colby A.F.C. are a football club from Colby on the Isle of Man. They compete in the Isle of Man Football League and wear black and white kits. They play their home games at Station Fields in Colby.

== History ==
Formed in 1919, the club joined the Isle of Man Football Association in 1920. The club changed kit colours four times before settling on their current black and while striped kit. They are based in Colby a small village in the south west of the island.

They have won the Manx FA Cup once in 1927–28 They won the Paul Henry Gold Cup in 1989–90 beating Corinthians 1–0 in the final. In the 1990–91 season Colby won the Woods Cup, beating Braddan 2–1 in the final and were losing finalists in the Paul Henry Gold Cup. In 1992–93 they won the Paul Henry Gold Cup again with a 1–0 victory over Braddan in the final.

They won the Woods Cup again in the 1994–95 season beating Ramsey Youth Centre Old Boys 3–0 in the final. In 1996–97 they captured the Woods Cup for a third time, this time beating Peel 1–0 in the final. In 1999/00 Colby beat Corinthians 1–0 in the Woods Cup final with Alan Harrison 'rising like a salmon from the brook' (his words on Manx Radio afterwards) to head the winner. In 1995–96 they were losing finalists in the Paul Henry Gold Cup.

They won the Paul Henry Gold Cup and were promoted to the First Division as runners-up in the 1996–97 season, but were relegated the next season finishing bottom of the league. They won the Paul Henry Gold Cup in 2000–01 and in 2001–02 they were promoted as champions of Division Two, losing just one league game all season, and were losing finalist in the Paul Henry Gold Cup. They were relegated again in 2004–05 and the following season they won the Woods Cup, beating Union Mills 2–1 in the final (AET), and were losing finalists in the Paul Henry Gold Cup.

In the 2007–08 season the club were promoted to the Premier League as Division Two champions, going through the entire season without losing a league match winning 25 and drawing one while scoring 153 goals in 26 games. They also won the Woods Cup for a fifth time beating Braddan 2–0 in the final.

The 2008–9 season saw the club relegated back to Division 2. The movement of several key players to rivals Rushen United just before the start of the season was a tough blow to take. Initially Colby rallied with some good early season victories, but eventually the side was relegated on goal difference.

The proceeding seasons saw the club finish regularly in the top 4 of Division 2, but promotion back to the Premier League was illusive. Colby were losing finalists in both the Woods Cup and Paul Henry Gold Cup Finals in 2010–11. The 2011–12 season saw the club move from their home at Glen Road to a new multiple pitch ground at Station Fields.

2012-13 saw the club miss out on promotion on goal difference, as well as lose the Paul Henry Gold Cup Final 4–2 to Ayre United. The combination side were champions of Combination Division 2. In the 2013–14 season the club finished 3rd again and reached the Paul Henry Gold Cup Final, only to lose 5–2, again to Ayre United. The losing run of cup final losses continued for the next two seasons with back to back defeats to Douglas Athletic in the Woods Cup.

In the Isle of Man League 2015–16 season the southern club were promoted from JCK Division Two to the Canada Life Premier League as they finished second in the league. They confirmed their promotion by beating Douglas Royals 3–1 away from home, with Ashley Blake, Carl Hickey and Jordan Primrose-Smith scoring the goals. They also reached the final of the Woods Cup, losing 2–1 in extra time to Douglas Athletic.

In their first season back in the Canada Life Premier League in the Isle Of Man League 2016–17 season, Colby finished 9th with 23 points and their combination finished 8th with 23 points, beating local rivals Rushen United FC 1-0 thanks to a Luke Roberts goal on 04/02/2017. They were relegated at the end of the 2017–18 season after many key decisions went against them, ending up bottom on goal difference. Their combination didn't fare any better, finishing bottom with only 9 points.

After several seasons back in JCK Division 2, and after losing over 20 players to other clubs in the summer of 2021, it was decided for the 2021–22 season that the club would enter a side into the Isle of Man Football Combination Division 2 only. It is hoped that with the acquisition of some new players, as well as the eligibility of several of the club's current u16 side for senior football, that the club will be able to field two men's senior teams again in the 2022–23 season.

The club have a long term reputation for a strong youth set up and 8 of the 2021-22 FC Isle of Man squad started with Colby. The club's masters (veterans) side are very successful. They have won the IOM Masters league and cup on several occasions. The women's side ran for a number of years and produced several Isle of Man internationals.

The 2022–23 season saw the return of the club to IOM Division 2, with the combination side playing IOM Combination 2. The first team secured their first win of the season in their second match with a 5–0 win vs. Governors Athletic.

On March 1st 2025, the combination team secured their first title since 2013 with 2 games to spare, goals from Jack Skillicorn, Seb Spiers, Steve Collister and Jack Fordham secured a 4-1 win over Gymns to bring the trophy to Station Fields.

On April 28th 2026, Colby secured both promotion to the Premier League and the Division 2 title with a 1-0 win over Douglas Royals at Station Fields, Jordan Edge with the only goal of the game

== Honours ==
=== League ===
- Second Division champions (3): Isle of Man League 2001–02, 2007–08, 2025-26

=== Cup ===
- FA Cup (1): 1927–28
- Woods Cup (5): 1990–91, 1994–95, 1996–97, 1999–00, 2005–06, 2007–08
- Paul Henry Gold Cup (4): 1989–90, 1992–93, 1996–97, 2000–01
