= St Georges A.F.C. =

Association football club on the Isle of Man

Coordinates: 54.169274°N 4.472789°W

- Full name: St Georges Association Football Club
- Founded: 1919
- Ground: The Campsite; Douglas, Isle of Man
- Capacity: unknown
- Manager: Johnny Myers
- League: Isle of Man Football League Premier League
- 2016–17: Premier League, 1/13
Home colours	Away colours

St Georges A.F.C. are a football club from Douglas on the Isle of Man. They compete in the Isle of Man Football League and they play in amber and black kits. They play their home games at Glencrutchery Road in Douglas. They have won the top division of Manx football (First Division/Premier League) 20 times, including the inaugural Premier League in 2007–08. They have won the Manx FA Cup eight times.

== History ==
Formed in 1919, St Georges have been the dominant force in the Isle of Man's top division for a few years, securing the title four times.

The club were First Division champions in 1990–91, runners-up in 1992–93 and then won the league again in both 1993–94 and 1994–95. In 2002–03 they were losing finalists in the Manx FA Cup In 2003–04 they won the league again and followed that up with another championship winning season the following year. They also won the Manx FA Cup, beating Laxey 3–0 in the final and the Railway Cup with a 7–0 victory over Marown in the final. In addition they were losing finalists in the Hospital Cup. The following season they finished as runners-up in the league behind Laxey, and were losing finalists in both the Railway Cup and the Hospital Cup also to Laxey. They also lost to Laxey in the Charity Shield. The clubs Island representatives were part of the Isle of Man National Squad that created history on 7 May 2006 when they became the first offshore team to win an FA competition, winning the FA National League System Cup. They then went on to represent England in the 2006–07 UEFA Regions' Cup played in the Czech Republic. In 2006–07 they re-gained the League championship from Laxey, and also won the Charity Shield

The club won the Manx FA Cup for the sixth time on 24 March 2008 when they beat Peel, 5–0 in the final held at the Bowl stadium in Douglas. They then won their tenth domestic league title when they were crowned Premier League champions with a 1–0 win over Gymnasium on 3 May 2008. And they made it a 2007–08 season treble with victory over Corinthians in the Hospital Cup final at the Bowl on 25 May 2008.

The club has a reserve team that competes in the Isle of Man Football Combination. They also have an Under-18 team. They were awarded The Football Association Charter Standard in 2007.

== Facilities ==
St Georges have a clubhouse at the ground on Glencrutchery Road, with the entrance located between the grandstand and Governor's Bridge on the Isle of Man TT motorcycle racing course. During the TT season the ground is used as a campsite.

== Honours ==
=== First team ===
==== League ====
- Division One Champions (9): 1956–57, 1960–61, 1961–62, 1991–92, 1993–94, 1994–95, 2003–04, 2004–05, 2006–07
- Premier League Champions (9): 2007–08, 2008–09, 2010–11, 2011–12, 2012–13, 2013–14, 2014–15, 2015–16, 2016–17, 2017–18

==== Cup ====
- Manx FA Cup (7): 1928–29, 1946–47, 1954–55, 1956–57, 2004–05, 2007–08, 2009–10, 2011–12
- Hospital Cup (6): 1991–92, 1993–94, 2007–08, 2008–09, 2010–11, 2011–12, 2012–13
- Railway Cup (6): 1989–90, 1990–91, 2004–05, 2010–11, 2011–12, 2012–13, 2013–14, 2016–17
- Charity Shield (5): 2004–05, 2006–07, 2010–11, 2011–12, 2012–13

==== Individual honours ====
- Isle of Man Player of the Year
  - Ciaran Mcnulty – 2013–14
  - Sean Quaye – 2008–09
  - Chris Bass Jnr – 2007–08
  - Calum Morrissey – 2005–06
  - Johnny Myers – 2004–05
  - Chris Bass Jnr – 2003–04
  - Johnny Myers – 2002–03

=== Reserve team ===
==== Cup ====
- Junior Cup (3): 1990–91, 1992–93, 2002–03, 2010–11
