= Onchan A.F.C. =

Association football club on the Isle of Man

- Full name: Onchan Association Football Club
- Nickname: The Mighty O's
- Founded: 1912
- Ground: Nivison Stadium, Onchan, Isle of Man
- Capacity: not known
- Chairman: David Rees
- Manager: James O'Kelly (First Team Manager) and Mark Rees (Combination Manager)
- League: Isle of Man Football League Division One
- 2016–17: Division Two, 4/13
Home colours	Away colours

Onchan Association Football Club are a football club from Onchan on the Isle of Man. They compete in the Isle of Man Football League and wear a yellow and blue kit. They play their home games at the Nivison Stadium in Onchan.

== History ==
Formed in 1912, the club entered the Second League. After World War I they moved up to the First League. In 1938–39 they won the Railway Cup. They were Isle of Man League champions in 1946–47. Since then, they have spent much of their time in Division Two. They were promoted as champions in 1964–65 and also won the Woods Cup, beating Ronaldsway 7–4 in the final. The following season, they finished in fourth place in the First Division. They were relegated in 1975–76. They won the Woods Cup again in the 1978–79 season, beating Union Mills in the final. They won the Woods Cup for a third time, beating Michael United 3–1 in the final. The club currently play in Division Two.

The club has a reserve team that plays in the Isle of Man Football Combination. They also have a junior section.

In October 2008 Onchan became the eleventh club on the island to achieve The Football Association Charter Standard status, the FA's kitemark scheme for quality assurance.

For the 2011–12 campaign, the first team was jointly managed by Robbie Prescott and Fletcher Christian.

== Stadium ==
The Onchan Park stadium was originally opened in 1952. The first game played there was the 1951–52 Manx FA Cup final with Ramsey beating Douglas High School Old Boys 3–2. Onchan F.C. moved into the stadium the following season.

== Honours ==
=== League ===
- Division One champions (1): 1946–47
- Division Two champions (4): 1931–32, 1951–52, 1960–61, 1964–65

=== Cup ===
- Woods Cup (3) : 1964–65, 1978–79, 1992–93
  - finalist (4) : 1975–76, 1988–89, 1991–92, 1995–96
- Railway Cup (1) : 1938–39,
- Paul Henry Gold Cup (2) : 2020–21, 2023-24

=== Cup ===
- Junior Cup (3) : 1930–31, 1932–33, 2025-26
  - finalist (3) : 1933–34, 1934–35, 1976–77
- Cowell Cup (2) : 1961–62, 1985–86, 1986–87
- Combination Division 1 (1): 2024-25
- CFS Combination Division 2 (3) : 2009–10, 2018–19, 2023-24
