= Pulrose United A.F.C. =

Association football club on the Isle of Man

- Full name: Pulrose United Association Football Club
- Nickname: Pully or The Reds
- Founded: 1932; 94 years ago
- Ground: Springfield Road, Pulrose; Douglas Isle of Man
- Capacity: Open recreational field
- Chairman: Peter ‘Mo’ Powesland
- Manager: Harry Wilfred Lowther
- League: Isle of Man Football League Division Two
- 2025–26: Division Two, 5th
- Website: pulroseunited.co.uk
Home colours	Away colours

Pulrose United A.F.C. is a football club from Pulrose, Douglas on the Isle of Man which competes in the Isle of Man Football League Division Two and Combination Two. They wear an all-red home kit and play home games at Springfield Road, Douglas.

== History ==
Formed in 1932, Pulrose United A.F.C won their first trophy in the 1967–68 season, winning the First Division championship. Following this, Pulrose United was the Isle of Man champions for four seasons, winning the title again in 1968–69, 1969–70, and 1970–71. They won the Manx FA Cup and the Woods Cup in 1970–71. They were relegated to Division Two and were promoted again in the 1989–90 season. They were Isle of Man champions again in 1992–93, also winning the Railway Cup and beating St Marys 5–0 in the final, and were Manx FA Cup finalists, losing 4–1 to Castletown. The following season, they were runners-up in the Railway Cup, losing 2–1 to Douglas High School Old Boys in the final.

Pulrose United finished in last place and were again relegated to Division Two in the 1996–97 season. They were promoted again to the top flight in the 1999–2000 season. The 2002–03 season saw Pulrose again relegated in last place. However, they were promoted, the season after, as runners-up to Douglas Royal. Pulrose United Bounced between the divisions during this period, as they once again finished bottom in the top flight and were relegated. In the 2005–06 season, they reached the final of the Manx FA Cup despite being in the second division but ended up losing 5–0 to Laxey on 17 April 2006.

In recent times Pulrose won back-to-back Woods cups in both 2017–18 and 2018–19, also getting promoted to the Premier League in 2018–19 and were Gold Cup finalists in 2018. They currently play in Division Two. In 2025 Pulrose were awarded ‘Club of the year’ at the annual Isle of Man FA awards ceremony

The club has a reserve team that plays in the Isle of Man Combination Two.

== Honours ==
=== First team ===
==== League ====
- Division One Champions (5): 1967–68, 1968–69, 1969–70, 1970–71, 1992–93
- Division Two Champions (9): 1932–33, 1936–37, 1938–39, 1947–48, 1953–54. 1957–58, 1961–62, 1977–78, 1999–00
- Promotions/Runners-Up (4): 1986–87, 1989–90, 2003–04, 2018–19

==== Cup ====
- Manx FA Cup (1): 1970–71
- Railway Cup (2): 1952–53, 1992–93
- Hospital Cup (3): 1957–58, 1966–67, 1970–71
- Woods Cup (3): 1977–78, 2017–18, 2018–19
- Gold Cup (1): 1999–00

=== Combination team ===
==== League ====
- Combination One Champions (5): 1955–56, 1960–61, 1966–67, 1967–68, 1968–69
- Combination Two Champions (2): 1999–00, 2025–26

==== Cup ====
- Junior Cup (6): 1946–47, 1947–48, 1968–69, 1979–80, 1999–00, 2000–01
- Cowell Cup (3): 1994–95, 1997–98, 1998–99
