= Corinthians A.F.C. =

Football club on the Isle of Man

Coordinates: 54.169481°N 4.505171°W

- Full name: Corinthians Association Football Club
- Nickname: The Whites
- Founded: 1930
- Ground: Ballafletcher; Douglas, Isle of Man
- Capacity: not known
- Chairman: Tony Mepham
- Manager: Ben Qualtrough
- League: Isle of Man Football League Premier League
- 2020–21: Premier League, 1/13
Home colours	Away colours

Corinthians A.F.C. is a football club from Douglas on the Isle of Man. They compete in the Isle of Man Football League. They wear white shirts with black shorts and socks and play their home games at Ballafletcher in Douglas. The club reserve team play in the Isle of Man Football Combination and they also have a women's team.

== History ==
Corinthians were formed in 1930 and after playing a series of friendlies, they joined the Isle of Man Football Association in 1933, and competed in Division Two. They won their first trophy in 1949, beating St Marys in the Junior Cup final. In 1966 they won the Division Two title and after struggling through the 1970s before once again winning Division Two in 1979. They were relegated from the First Division in 1984–85. They were Division Two champions for a third time in 1989–90. However, their stay in the top flight was short lived and they were relegated once again in 1991–92. They stayed in Division Two until winning promotion as runners-up to Pulrose United in 1999–00. Their stay in the First Division lasted just one season as they were again relegated,

Corinthians won the Gold Cup for the first time in the club's history, having previously lost three times in the final, on 30 December 2001 by beating Colby 2–0 at the Bowl stadium in Douglas. They were also Manx FA Cup finalists, losing 1–0 to St Marys in the final and were promoted straight back up to the First Division, this time as runners-up to Colby. The club's stay in the top flight this time lasted two seasons, before being relegated yet again in 2003–04. In October 2004 they were presented with the Football Association Charter Standard Community Club award by Trevor Brooking at the Isle of Man Football Association headquarters in Douglas.

In 2004–05 they again won the Woods Cup, beating Police in the final 4–1 on 26 March 2005. They finished as runners-up in Division Two in the 2006–07 season and were promoted to the Premier League with a 3–1 victory over Pulrose United on 2 May 2007.

In the 2007–08 season the club finished mid-table in ninth in the Premier League, finishing the season with an 11–0 demolition of Laxey on 16 May 2008 and were runners-up to St Georges in the Hospital Cup with Captain Paul Healey winning the man of the match in his final match for the club. The manager in the 09/10 season was: Johnathan McDowell.

== Honours ==
=== League ===
- Isle of Man Premier League (1) : 2020–21.
- Division Two champions (3): 1965–66, 1978–79, 1989–90
  - runners-up (6): 1959–60, 1963–64, 1967–68, 1999–00, 2001–02, 2006–07
- Cup
- Manx FA Cup Winner (3) 2018, 2021, 2023.
- Manx FA Cup finalist (1): 2001
- Hospital Cup (2): 1956–57, 1959–60
  - finalist (3): 1980–81, 1990–91, 2007–08, 2017–18
- Woods Cup (4): 1963–64, 1967–68, 1989–90, 2004–05
  - finalist (1): 1998–99
- Paul Henry Gold Cup (1): 2001–02
  - finalist (3): 1989–90, 1996–97, 2006–07
- Railway Cup Champions (2) 2017–18, 2020–21.
- Manx FA Cup Champions (2) 2017–18, 2020–21.

=== League ===
- Combination Two champions (8): 1968, 1987, 1993, 1997, 2001, 2004–05, 2005–06, 2006–07

=== Cup ===
- Junior Cup (2): 1948–49, 2006–07
  - finalist (2): 1961–62, 2001–02
- Cowell* Cup (4): 1984–85, 1992–93, 1993–94, 1995–96
  - finalist (2): 1962–63, 2006–07, 2017–2018

=== Women's team ===
==== League ====
- Division One runners-up (1): 2006–07
- Division Two champions (2): 2001, 2004–05
  - runners-up (1): 2000

==== Cup ====
- Manx Women'sFA Cup finalist (1): 2004–05
- HSBC Floodlit Cup (1): 2007–08
  - finalist (1): 2006–07
