= Michael United A.F.C. =

Association football club on the Isle of Man

Coordinates: 54.228119°N 4.588296°W

- Full name: Michael United Association Football Club
- Nickname: Aces
- Founded: 1919
- Ground: Lough Ny Magher, Balleira Road; Kirk Michael, Michael Isle of Man
- Capacity: not known
- Chairman: Ryan Brew (Committee Chairman)
- Manager: 1st Team – Michael Corlett Combination Team – George Taylor
- League: Isle of Man Football League Division Two
- 2021–22: Division Two
Home colours	Away colours

Michael United A.F.C. are a football club from the village of Kirk Michael, Isle of Man in the parish of Michael in the Isle of Man. They compete in the Isle of Man Football League and wear a striped green and white kit. They play their home games at Lough Ny Magher, Balleira Road in Kirk Michael.

== History ==
Michael United were formed in 1919. They have won the Hospital Cup three times, the Woods Cup twice and the Paul Henry Gold Cup once. In 2003–04 they won the Woods Cup beating Police in the final on 22 February 2004. In the 2006–07 season they finished in third place in Division Two and reached the final of the Woods Cup where they lost to Douglas High School Old Boys 3–1. They were promoted to the Premier League in the 2007–08 season as runners-up to Colby and they also won the Gold Cup beating Castletown 3–0 in the final.

The club has a reserve team that play in the Isle of Man Football Combination.

== Facilities ==
The club provides changing facilities along with a clubhouse that overlooks the pitch. The club are currently working towards completion of a training pitch with floodlights at Balleira Road. They have a campsite that opens each year during the annual Isle of Man TT motorcycle racing.

== Honours ==
=== First team ===
==== League ====
- Second Division champions: 1958–59, 2012–13.

==== Cup ====
- Hospital Cup (3): 1958–59, 1960–61, 1962–63
  - finalist (1): 1956–57
- Woods Cup (2): 1962–63, 2003–04
  - finalist (2): 1992–93, 2006–07
- Paul Henry Gold Cup (1): 2007–08

=== Reserve team ===
==== League ====
- Combination League champions (1): 2007–08
