= Laxey A.F.C. =

Association football club on the Isle of Man

Coordinates: 54.228119°N 4.397966°W

- Full name: Laxey Association Football Club
- Nickname: "The Miners"
- Founded: 1910
- Ground: Laxey Football Ground, Glen Road; Laxey, Isle of Man
- Chairman: Dave Callow
- League: Isle of Man Football League Premier League
- 2016–17: Premier League, 8/13
Home colours	Away colours

Laxey A.F.C. are a football club from Laxey on the Isle of Man. Nicknamed The Miners they compete in the Isle of Man Football League. They play in a green and white striped kit and play their home games at Glen Road in Laxey. The reserve team play in the Isle of Man Football Combination.

== History ==
Formed in 1910, Laxey have won the Isle of Man Football League once and Division Two five times as well as numerous Cup triumphs.

In the 1980s, David Cole became a professional footballer after playing for Laxey. He went on to play for Swindon Town, Torquay United, Rochdale, Sunderland and St Mirren.

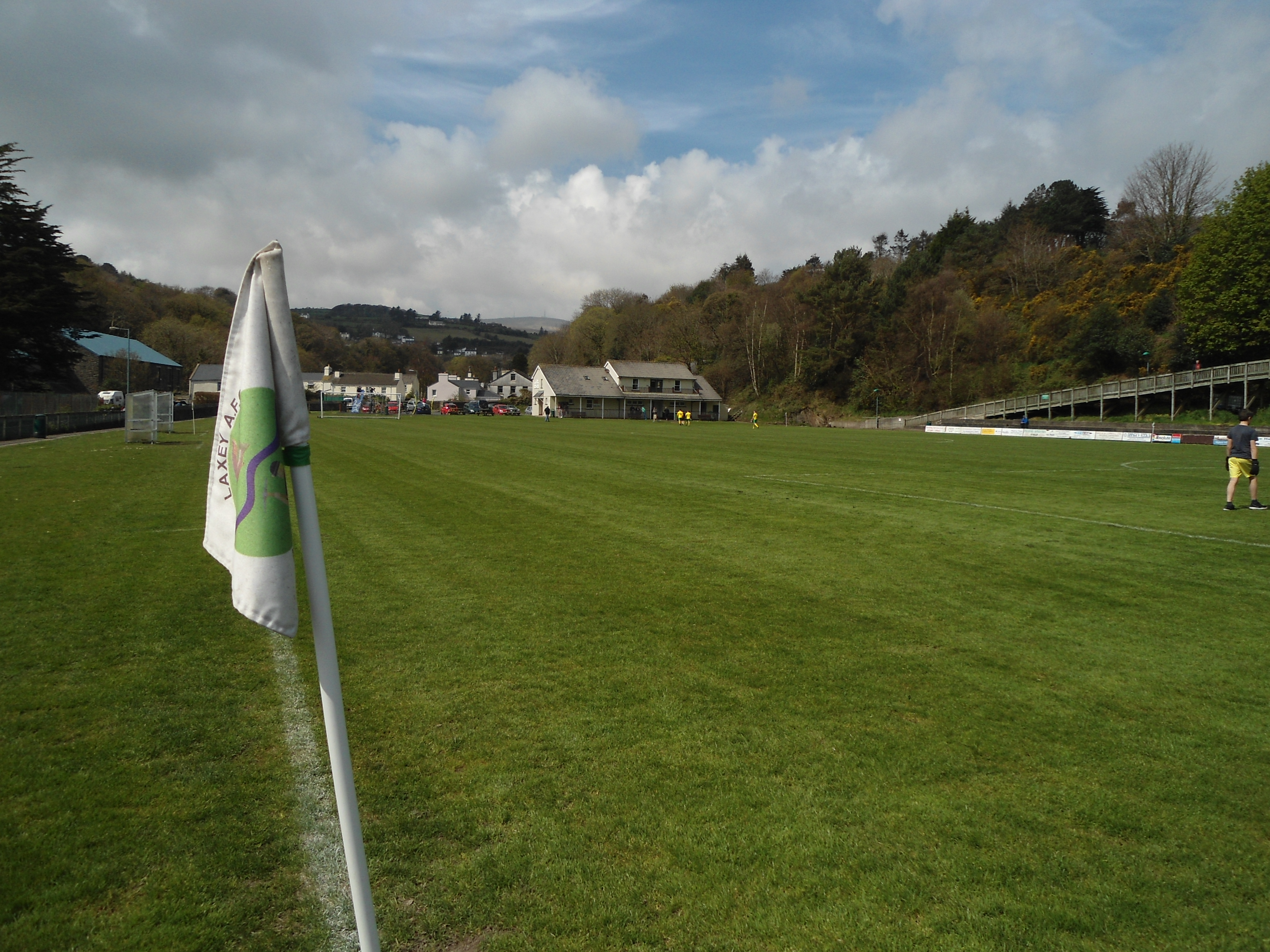
The Glen Road ground

In the 2003–4 season Laxey won its first major trophy for 49 years when they won the Railway Cup beating St Marys 3–2 in the final on 26 December 2003. They also won the Hospital Cup beating Castletown 2–0 in the final on 16 May 2004. In the 2004–05 season they were losing finalists in the Manx FA Cup and finished in second place in Division One. The reserve team won were Combination One champions and won the Junior Cup.

In 2005–06 they completed the Manx Grand Slam when they were crowned Division One champions and also won the Manx FA Cup, the Hospital Cup, the Railway Cup and the Charity Shield, while the reserve team won the Junior Cup. Their first trophy that season was the Charity Shield in August 2005, which ended 0–0 against St Georges, with Laxey winning on penalties. They won the Railway Cup on 26 December 2005, beating St Georges 1–0 in the final. In April 2006 they won the Manx FA Cup for the first time in the club's history, beating Pulrose United 5–0 in the final. They were crowned league champions on 26 April with a 7–2 victory over Marown. The first team completed the Manx Grand Slam on 22 May 2006 with victory in the Hospital Cup final, when again they met and beat St Georges, this time winning 4–3. Later in the month the Reserve team added to the trophy cabinet when they won the Junior Cup, beating Peel Reserves 6–3 in the final.

In 2006–07 they won the Hospital Cup for the third time in four years and won the Charity Shield for the second year running as well as being losing finalists in the Railway Cup. In the league, they finished in third place. The reserve team were again Combination One champions. The 2007–08 season saw the club finish in fourth place in the new Premier League. They reached the semi-finals of the FA Cup and Railway Cup.

Laxey have a two-storey clubhouse with snack and alcohol bars at their Glen Road home as well as a campsite which is available for use during the annual Isle of Man TT motorcycle racing.

== Honours ==
=== First team ===
==== League ====
- Division One champions (1): 2006–07
  - runners-up (2): 1953, 2004–05, 2012–13
- Second league champions (4): 1929, 1930, 1931, 1970
  - runners-up (2): 1949, 1950
- Division Two champions (5): 1956, 1964, 1970, 1995, 1999
  - runners-up (2): 1975, 1982

==== Cup ====
- Manx FA Cup (1): 2005–06
  - finalist (2): 1964–65, 2004–05
- Hospital Cup (5): 1955–56, 2003–04, 2005–06, 2006–07, 2022–23
  - finalist (3): 1972–73, 1999–00, 2000–01
- Woods Cup finalist (4): 1960–61, 1968–69, 1981–82, 1993–94
- Paul Henry Gold Cup (1): 1998–99
- Charity Shield (2): 2005–06, 2006–07
  - finalist (3): 1973, 2000, 2001
- Railway Cup (3): 1929–30, 2003–04, 2005–06
  - finalist (6): 1933–34, 1934–35, 1936–37, 1949–50, 1958–59, 2006–07
- Miners Cup (3): 1994, 1998, 1999
- Percy Callister Cup (3): 1998, 1999, 2000

=== Reserve team ===
==== League ====
- Combination One (2): 2004–05, 2005–06
  - runners-up (2): 2002, 2006, 2016–17
- Combination Two runners-up (1): 1995

==== Cup ====
- Junior Cup (7): 1931–32, 1949–50, 1960–61, 1963–64, 2002–03, 2004–05, 2005–06
  - finalist (3): 1962–63, 1977–8, 2003–04, 2016-17
