= Ramsey A.F.C. =

Association football club on the Isle of Man

Coordinates: 54.325922°N 4.386123°W

- Full name: Ramsey Association Football Club
- Nickname: The Alberts or The Blues
- Founded: 1885
- Ground: Ballacloan Stadium, North Shore Road; Ramsey Isle of Man
- Capacity: 500 (342 seated)
- Chairman: Jonathan Leece
- Manager: Anthony Cooper/Andy Perry
- League: Isle of Man Football League Premier League
| Home colours | Away colours |

Ramsey A.F.C. is a football club from Ramsey on the Isle of Man. They compete in the Isle of Man Football League and they wear a blue and white kit, and a change strip of all red. They play their home games at the Ballacloan Stadium in Ramsey.

== History ==
Although there is evidence that football matches took place in Ramsey from 1885, it was not until Saturday 3 November 1888 that the Isle of Man Times reported that 'At a recent meeting of the club that has recently (sic) been formed, Mr F. Leighton presiding, it was resolved to call the club 'Ramsey Albert' and to play in black jerseys, with amber sash'. Originally playing the Rugby code, at the start of the 1890-91 season the Club adopted Association football 'in addition' and was admitted to the Isle of Man Football Association on Saturday 20 September 1890. By the end of January 1891 the Club had decided to purely play the Association code.

They are one of the oldest and one of the most successful clubs in the Isle of Man Football League. Much of that success though came in the last part of the 19th century and early part of the 20th century. They have been crowned Isle of Man champions eleven times and won the Manx FA Cup 18 times.

The club's first trophy came in 1891–92 when they shared the Manx FA Cup with Peel. They won the cup again the following two seasons. They were Isle of Man champions for four consecutive years between 1898–99 and 1901–02, winning the league six more times before World War II. Their last championship came in the 1951–52 season.

Ramsey were relegated to Division Two in the 1985–86 season finishing bottom of the league. They were promoted back to the top flight though before being relegated again in 1990–91. The following season they finished as runners-up in Division Two and were promoted back to the First Division. However, they were relegated straight back down in the 1992–93 season. In 2000–01 they were promoted again, finishing as runners-up to Ayre United only to be relegated once again the following season. They continued their roller coaster ride between the leagues with promotion again the following season as Division Two champions. They also won both the Paul Henry Gold Cup, beating St Johns United 2–1 in the final and the Woods Cup, beating Union Mills 2–0 in the final In 2003–04 they won the Manx FA Cup, beating Castletown in the final on penalties. They currently play in the Premier League.

They also have a big junior setup, which consists of an Under 11's A+B, Under 13's, Under 15's and Under 17's. The club has a reserve team that play in the Isle of Man Football Combination.

As an ode to their history for the 140 year celebrations from 1885 to 2025, the original coloured shirt of black with an amber sash was brought back as their second strip for two seasons 2024–25 and 2025–26. This was the brain child of the Chairman Jonathan Leece.

== Stadium ==
Ramsey's home ground is the Ballacloan Stadium, North Shore Road in Ramsey. The stadium has a modern covered grandstand with about 342 seats, with the letters RAFC on the seating, also around the stadium they have an old styled stone seating/terracing area.

== Honours ==
=== League ===
- First Division One champions (11): 1898–99, 1899–1900, 1900–01, 1901–02, 1907–08, 1910–11, 1911–12, 1912–13, 1920–21, 1926–27, 1951–52,
- Second Division champions (1): 2002–03, 2018–19

=== Cup ===
- Manx FA Cup (18): 1891–92, 1892–93, 1893–94, 1895–96, 1899–1900, 1900–01, 1904–05, 1906–07, 1907–08, 1919–20, 1920–21, 1921–22, 1930–31, 1951–52, 1978–79, 1979–80, 1980–81, 2003–04.
- Railway Cup (12): 1909-10, 1910-11, 1912-13, 1913-14, 1925-26, 1926-27, 1933-34, 1934-35, 1935-36, 1948-49, 1957-58, 1958-59.
- Woods Cup (6): 1957-58, 1958-59, 1971-72, 1987-88, 1991–92, 2002–03
- Paul Henry Gold Cup (3): 1991–92, 2002–03, 2018–19
- Hospital Cup (3): 1977-78, 2023-2024, 2024-2025
- Cowell Cup (6): 1935-36, 1962-63, 1976-77, 1977-78, 1981-82, 2024-25
- Junior Cup - Combination League Cup (6) 1925-26, 1952-53, 1956-57, 1958-59, 1982-83, 2023-24
