= Douglas Athletic F.C. =

Football club on the Isle of Man

- Full name: Douglas Athletic Football Club
- Nickname: The Pinks
- Founded: 2012
- Ground: Springfield Road, Pulrose; Douglas Isle of Man
- Treasurer and Secretary: John Minter
- Chairman: Stephen "The Crab" Cowan
- Manager: Jamie Clague
- League: Isle of Man Football League Premier League
- 2016–17: Premier League, 10/13
| Home colours | Away colours |

Douglas Athletic F.C. are a football club from Douglas on the Isle of Man. They compete in the Isle of Man Football League and wear a pink and black kit. They play their home games at Springfield Road in Douglas. The club recently celebrated its 10-year anniversary.

Stephen "The Crab" Cowan currently leads DAFC as chairman, supported by John Minter as treasurer & secretary with Jamie Clague as first team manager.

== History ==
Formed in 1989 as Police A.F.C., they share the clubhouse and pitch with Pulrose United. They played their first few seasons in Division Two. They won their first trophy in the 1994–95 season when they won the Paul Henry Gold Cup, beating Ronaldsway in the final. They were promoted as Division Two champions in 1995–96. In the 1996–97 they finished in seventh place in the First Division, the club's highest league placing to date. They stayed in the top flight until the 1999–2000 season when they finished in last place and were relegated to Division Two. However, they also reached the final of the Manx FA Cup, where they lost to Gymnasium.

They reached the final of the Woods Cup in the 2003–04 season, losing to Michael United on penalties on 22 February 2004. The following season they again reached the Woods Cup final, this time losing to Corinthians, 4–1 on 26 March 2005. The club changed its name to its current incarnation in 2012.

The club has a reserve team that play in the Isle of Man Football Combination.

In 2015 the club was sponsored by Old Mutual International.

In 2021 long term chairman Mark Lilleyman stepped down and lifelong player Stephen "The Crab" Cowan was voted in to lead the club as chairman.

2022 marked 10 years since DAFC was founded.

In 2023, club legend John Minter Revolutionised how subs are being paid, implementing a pay as you play system.

== Honours ==
=== League ===
- Division Two champions (1): 2015–16
- Combination Two champions (1): 2014–15

=== Cup ===
- Woods Cup Champions (2) : 2014–15, 2015–16
- Paul Henry Cup Champions (1) : 2015-16
