= Malew A.F.C. =

Association football club on the Isle of Man

- Full name: Malew Association Football Club
- Nickname: Ballasalla Boys
- Founded: 1922
- Ground: Malew Football Ground, Clagh Vane; Ballasalla, Malew, Isle of Man
- Capacity: Open Area
- Chairman: Adam Drewett
- Manager: Cal Alexander
- League: Isle of Man Football League Division Two
- 2020–21: Division Two, 4th
Home colours	Away colours

Malew A.F.C. are a football club from Ballasalla, Malew in the Isle of Man. They compete in the Isle of Man Football League. They wear a red and black kit and play their home games at Clagh Vane in Ballasalla.
