= Rushen United F.C. =

Association football club on the Isle of Man

Coordinates: 54.083833°N 4.752855°W

- Full name: Rushen United Football Club
- Nickname: "Moryn Vannin" – The Pride of Mann (The Spaniards)
- Founded: 1910
- Ground: Croit Lowey; Port Erin, Isle of Man
- Capacity: 1,000
- Manager: Nick Robinson
- League: Isle of Man Football League Premier League
Home colours	Away colours

Rushen United F.C. are a football club from Port Erin on the Isle of Man. They compete in the Isle of Man Football League. The team wear yellow and black stripes kit and play their home games at Croit Lowey in Port Erin. They have been Isle of Man League Champions ten times and won the Manx FA Cup ten times.

== History ==
Rushen United F.C. formed in September 1910 following a civic meeting at St Catherines Church Hall in Port Erin. The club motto is Moryn Vannin, which in Manx roughly means "The Pride of Mann". The club has a reserve team who compete in the Isle of Man Football Combination as well as a ladies team and a junior academy.

Rushen's first trophy came in the 1921–22 season when they won the Railway Cup. They won the Manx FA Cup for the first time in 1923–24 and were crowned Isle of Man champions for the first time in 1925–26, when they also won the Manx FA Cup and the Hospital Cup.

The club's highest profile match came in July 2005 in front of 3,288 spectators at the National Sports Centre in Douglas when Bolton Wanderers beat Rushen United 10–0. Bolton included eight first team regulars including striker Kevin Davies who scored four times in the first 28 minutes as well as Kevin Nolan, Henrik Pedersen and Gary Speed all of whom also scored. The match was filmed by Sky Sports to be featured on the stations Premier League Preview Show. It was also a fund raiser for the club's proposed new indoor training facility for which the club needed to raise £250,000. They managed to raise a total of £35,000 from the match and a Gala Dinner.

Locally, the club's biggest game each year is against Peel. The rivalry is believed to have begun as many of Peel's players were fishermen. Whilst Port Erin and nearby Port St Mary both had teams prior to the formation of Rushen United, many of the players in these teams also went to sea. Also, both clubs are overlooked by "Towers". Peel have Corrins Folly and Rushen have Milners Tower, which stands sentry to Port Erin Bay.

During 2002, and at the age of 50, club stalwart Eric Nelson played his 1000th game during a Division One fixture against Pulrose United at Croit Lowey, and was presented with a memento to mark the occasion. During the late 1970s and up to the late 1980s, the club won the First Division seven times in eleven seasons, including four years on the trot from 1977 to 1981. As of the 2008–09 season they are still in the top flight in Isle of Man football, which in 2007 was rebranded as the Sure Mobile Premier League.

On 5 May 2010, Rushen clinched its first Premier League title with a 2–0 victory over Michael United thanks to goals from Josh Kelly and Steve Riding. This brought a period of 22 years since winning Manx football's top prize to an end and ensured that the club will enter its centenary year as champions. In April 2011 a comprehensive victory over Laxey in the Isle of Man FA Cup final gave the 'Spaniards' their first FA Cup win for 21 years.

== Honours ==
=== First team ===
==== League ====
- Division One Champions (9): 1925–26, 1935–36, 1977–78, 1978–79, 1979–80, 1980–81, 1984–85, 1985–86, 1987–88
- Premier League Champions (1): 2009/10

==== Cup ====
- Manx FA Cup (9): 1923–24, 1924–25, 1925–26, 1933–34, 1935–36, 1950–51, 1977–78, 1989–90, 2010–2011, 2023–2024
- Hospital Cup (15): 1925–26, 1927–28, 1930–31, 1934–35, 1938–39, 1950–51, 1963–64, 1974–75, 1975–76, 1980–81, 1982–83, 1985–86, 1988–89, 1992–93, 2000–01, 2021–22
- Railway Cup (16): 1921–22, 1922–23, 1947–48, 1962–63, 1963–64, 1974–75, 1975–76, 1977–78, 1978–79, 1979–80, 1981–82, 1982–83, 1983–84, 1987–88, 2001–02, 2008–09
- Cowell Cup(13):1953–54, 1955–56, 1963–64, 1966–67, 1967–68, 1969–70, 1971–72, 1972–73, 1973–74, 1982–83, 1991–92, 2003–04, 2013–14, 2022/23

=== Reserve team ===
==== Cup ====
- Junior Cup (17): 1929–30, 1935–36, 1936–37, 1966–67, 1967–68, 1971–72, 1973–74, 1975–76, 1983–84, 1984–85, 1988–89, 1993–94, 1995–96, 1996–97, 2001–02, 2013–14, 2015–16, 2020–21, 2022–23
- Combination League (12): 1973–74, 1982–83, 1984–85, 1991–92, 1993–94, 1996–97, 1997–98, 2001–02, 2008–09, 2017–18, 2021–22, 2022/23
