= St Johns United A.F.C. =

Association football club on the Isle of Man

Coordinates: 54.200006°N 4.640535°W

- Full name: St Johns United Association Football Club
- Nickname: The Johners
- Founded: 1947
- Ground: St John's Football Ground; Mullen-e-Cloie; St John's, Isle of Man
- Chairman: Nick Ingham
- Manager: William Brown
- League: Isle of Man Football League Canada Life Premier League
- 2025-26: Canada Life Premier League, 4th
- Website: www.stjohnsfootballclub.com
Home colours	Away colours

St Johns United A.F.C. is a football club from St John's on the Isle of Man. It competes in the Isle of Man Football League. It plays in a royal blue and yellow striped kit and plays their home games at Mullen-y-Cloie in St John's.

== History ==
The club was founded in 1947 and played their home matches at Mullen y Cloie. Originally, St John's used the old courthouse across the road as a changing room, but when the floor boards started rotting away, they finally decided to build a small changing room on the Mullen y Cloie site. In the late 90's and early 00's the club began to raise money to fund the building of a state-of-the-art AstroTurf pitch, replacing the old carpet and sand training area. They played in a yellow and blue striped home Jersey, with blue socks and shorts. The first team was sponsored by A.V Craine and the combination side was sponsored by Roger Chadwick.

Their local rivals have been Peel, Foxdale and Marown. St John's and Marown annually contested both the Mushroom Cup and Shield in the pre-season.

St John's won their first trophy in the 1950–51 season, with the combination (reserves) winning the Junior Cup, defeating Northern Youth Center 4–3 in the final.

St John's reached the final of the Hospital Cup in the 1952–53 season, losing 6–2 to Braddan. The first trophy the St John's first team won was the Hospital Cup in the 1954–55 season, beating St Mary's 7–1 in the second replay, after the two sides had played out two 2-2 draws. They also lost in the 1959-60 Hospital Cup final 3–0 against Corinthians.

St John's have won the Captain George Woods Memorial Cup on three occasions, with the first coming in the 1965–66 season. They would have to wait until the 1983–84 season to taste success in the Woods Cup again. The 2010–11 season brought St John's there most recent win beating Colby in the final.

St John's United have won the Isle of Man FA Cup twice, in 1971–72 and 1975–76, with club legend Ernie Quayle playing a pivotal role in both finals.

In 1997–98 it won the Paul Henry Gold Cup, beating Ramsey 2–1 in the final. They were also promoted to the First Divisions as runners-up in Division Two. However, they lasted only one season in the top flight and were relegated to last place in 1998–99, winning only one league game that season.

In the 1999–2000 season St John's won their second Paul Henry Gold Cup. However they were losing finalists in 2002–03 in the Paul Henry Gold Cup and missed out on promotion by one point finishing in third place in Division Two. In 2004–05 they were promoted as Division Two champions and were again losing finalists in the Paul Henry Gold Cup. The following season they finished in 5th place in the First Division. In 2007–08 they finished in 12th place in the Premier League and were relegated to Division Two.

The next few seasons the club picked up two more Division Two league titles in 2008-09 and 2010–11. As the club regularly bounced between the Premier League and Division Two. The 2010–11 season also seen St John's first team have there most successful season, as they added the Woods Cup and Gold Cup to there Division Two Championship.

They will play in the Premier League in 2022–23 after being promoted as champions of JCK Division Two in the 2021–22 season. The 2021–22 season also seen St John's win the Paul Henry Gold Cup, beating Foxdale 1–0 in the final, as well as finishing runner up to Malew, losing 5–4 on penalties in the Woods Cup Final. The club's reserve side also won the Combination Division Two league title in the 2021–22 season.

In July 2022 Isaac Allen became the first player from St John's United to sign a professional contract, with the sixteen year old goalkeeper signing a two-year deal with League One side Lincoln City.

== Facilities ==
The club have a clubhouse at their football ground. The club also have a 112 pitch campsite and motor home berths, with internet and bathroom facilities, which is open from April to September. The club also has an astro turf football pitch.

St John's United also provides football training sessions to all children between the ages of 6 and 17. The club is represented in most age groups in the Isle of Man youth leagues.

== Honours ==
=== League ===
- Division Two Champions (5):

1949–50, 2004–05, 2008–09, 2010–11 2021–22

- Combination Division Two Champions (1):

2021–22

=== Cup ===
- Junior Cup (2): 1950–51, 2024-25
- Hospital Cup (1): 1954–55
- Captain George Woods Memorial Cup (3): 1965–66, 1983–84, 2010–11
- Manx FA Cup (2): 1971–72, 1975–76
- Paul Henry Gold Cup (4): 1997–98, 1999–00, 2010–11, 2021-22
