= Marown A.F.C. =

Association football club on the Isle of Man

- Full name: Marown Association Football Club
- Nickname: The Farmers
- Founded: 1950
- Ground: Memorial Playing Fields; Crosby; Marown, Isle of Man
- Chairman: Neil Withers
- Manager: David Brew/Colin Gilbert
- League: Isle of Man Football League Premier League
- 2021–22: Canada Life Premier League, 13th.
Home colours	Away colours

Marown A.F.C. are a football club from Crosby in the parish of Marown in the Isle of Man. They compete in the Premier League of the Isle of Man Football League and wear a maroon and gold strip. Home games are played at the Marown Memorial Playing Fields at Old Church Road, Crosby. The club was formed in 1950, and run teams ranging from Under 6s to Under 16s and seniors.

== History ==
The club was formed in 1950, and have won many honours and been a successful team throughout their existence.

In 1970-71 Marown won the Woods Cup, Combination 2 and the Cowell Cup.

In 1984–85, Marown were promoted from Division Two to the First Division, but they were relegated three seasons later in 1987–88. They were again promoted in the 1990–91 season as runners-up to St Marys, but relegated again the following season. They were promoted again in 1997–98 as Division Two champions.

In both 1999–2000 and 2000–01 they finished in third place in the First Division, and in 2001–02 finished as runners-up to Peel and were losing finalists in the Railway Cup. They again finished as runners-up the following two seasons.

The reserve team won the Junior Cup in 2003–04. In the 2005–06 season, they escaped relegation by one point finishing with 24 points. However, the following season they were relegated, finishing bottom on just nine points.

The club has a reserve team that play in the Isle of Man Football Combination. They also have a Junior department, Marown Juniors, with teams from Under-7 to Under-16. In May 2017 the Under-16 side reached the final of the Under-16s cup, but lost 2–0 to a dominant Ayre United side. On 11 August 2008, the Under-10 team represented the Isle of Man at the English FA's National Football Festival held at Wembley Stadium in London.

In 2012–13 season the club won club of the year.

The club won Division Two in 2014–15 and gained promotion to the Premier Division.

The club were relegated the season after, but in 2017–18 they won Division 2 and were promoted back to the Premier League.

Since promotion in 2017–18 the club have had a long stay in the Isle of Man's top division. Despite being relegated on the final day of the 2023–24 season, the Isle of Man FA offered the club a chance to stay in the top flight of Manx football as Douglas Royal opted for voluntary relegation. Marown AFC took that opportunity and played their football in the top flight throughout the 2024–25 campaign, but despite their best efforts, made history as the first team in Manx football to be relegated from the first division twice in two consecutive seasons. The club had their fate sealed in early March 2025 and were officially relegated to the second division. They will now regroup in the second division for the 2025–26 season.

== Ground ==
Home games are played at the fortress which is Marown Memorial Playing Fields, which was established 4 years before the football club, in 1946. The land was donated by Harley Cunningham and is dedicated to those who served their country during two world wars.

== Colours and badge ==
Marown AFC currently play in a maroon and gold strip and have done throughout their history.

== Team honours ==
=== Club ===
- IOMFA Club of the year
  - Winners 2012–13
- Fred Faragher fair play trophy
  - Winners 1970, 1971, 1972, 1973, 1975, 1976, 1980, 1985, 1986, 1987, 1988, 1992, 1993, 1994, 1997, 1998, 2009

=== First team ===
==== League ====
- Division One (0)
  - Runners-up 2001–02, 2002–03, 2003–04
- Division Two (3)
  - Champions 1997–98, 2014–15, 2017–18
  - Runners-up 1954–55, 1958–59, 1971–71, 1975–76, 1976–77, 1984–85, 1990-91, 2011–12

==== Cup ====
- Railway Cup (0)
  - Runners-up 2001–02, 2005–06
- Woods Cup (3)
  - Winners 1970–71, 1984–85, 1997–98
  - Runners-up 2013–14, 2017–18
- Hospital Cup (1)
  - Winners 1953–54
  - Runners-up 1952–53
- Gold Cup (0)
  - Runners-up 1993–94, 2011–12

=== Reserve team ===
==== League ====
- Combination One (1)
  - Winners 2001–02
- Combination Two (8)
  - Winners 1970–71, 1975–76, 1980–81, 1981–82, 1983–84, 1990–91, 2008–09, 2011–12

==== Cup ====
- Junior Cup (1)
  - Winners 2003–04
  - Runners-up 1965–66

=== Over 35s Masters ===
==== Masters ====
- FA Cup (1)
  - Winners 2013–14

=== Juniors ===
==== League ====
- Under 16's B League (2)
  - Winners 2017–18, 2024-25
- Under 14's B League (1)
  - Winners 2014–15
- Under 13's A League (1)
  - Winners 2013–14
- Under 11's B League (1)
  - Winners 2012–13

==== Cup ====
- Cowell Cup (1)
  - Winners 1970–71
- U16 Reg Lunt Plate (1)
  - Winners 2017–18
- U12 Office World Cup (1)
  - Winners 2015–16
- U11 Oxford cup (1)
  - Winners 2010–11

==== Women ====
- Division 2(1)
  - Winners 2003–04

== Individual honours ==
- Division 1 Player of the year
  - Anthony Halsall 2001–02
- Silver boot
  - Juan Killip 1997–98, 2011–12
- Women's Division 2 leading goalscorer
  - Jackie Ashman 2000–01, 2003–04

Combination 1 Golden Boot

  - Joe Kneale 2022–23
