= Braddan A.F.C. =

Association football club on the Isle of Man

- Full name: Braddan Association Football Club
- Nickname: The Swans
- Founded: 1923
- Ground: Cronkbourne Football Ground; Cronkbourne, Victoria Road, Douglas Isle of Man
- Chairman: Dave Goldsmith
- Manager: Will Smith
- League: Isle of Man Football League Premier League
Home colours	Away colours

Braddan A.F.C. is a football club in Douglas on the Isle of Man, competing in the Isle of Man Football League. The team wears royal blue strips and plays home games at Cronkbourne Football Ground, Victoria Road, Douglas.

== History 1923 to 1930 ==
Braddan is one of the 17 historic parishes of the Isle of Man.

Braddan Association Football Club was founded in 1923 under the chairmanship of Mr Frederick Clucas (later Sir Frederick), and was admitted to play in the Second League for their inaugural season. A playing pitch was established on land owned by Clucas' Laundry at Cronkbourne, Tromode (a suburb of Douglas) which was to be the club's home until 1995. Owing to the close links with the company which were to last for several decades, the club was soon nicknamed ‘The Laundrymen’. Blue was chosen as the club colour.

Braddan's first competitive match was played on 20 October 1923 and resulted in a 6–2 victory at home to Ramsey-based club St Olave's. The team never looked back, and won the Second League title by a convincing margin in that first season. The club received great praise in the local press during the season, not only for the quality of the football played by the team but also for the standard of the pitch and surroundings at Cronkbourne.

In that era of Manx football there was no automatic promotion and relegation, but Braddan's application to play in the First League was duly accepted for the 1924–25 season, with the reserve team playing in the Second League. Several years of consolidation in the top flight of Manx football followed, and Braddan's progress attracted a steady stream of quality footballers to the club. Prominent players in the club's early years were Alan Doig, a Scotsman who was a prolific goal scorer, and goalkeeper Leslie Evans - a renowned figure in Manx sport.

In the 1929–30 season Braddan secured their first major trophy, being crowned First League champions after their campaign. The team remained unbeaten until the last two games of the campaign - by which time they had already secured the title. After such a victory, Braddan became part of what was dubbed by the press as ‘The Eternal Triangle’ of trophy winners alongside Peel and Rushen United.

== History 1930 to 1939 ==
The First League title was retained in the 1930–31 season, when Braddan also won their first cup with a 2–0 triumph over local rivals Gymns in the Railway Cup Final played at Port St Mary. Both goals were scored by team captain Wally Noble. The Railway Cup was retained the following year when four goals from legendary centre-forward Tim Tickle gave Braddan a 4-2 success over Ramsey at Peel.

Tim Tickle was probably the finest player ever to pull on the blue shirt of Braddan, and such was his ability that in 1935 he left the island to play a season as a professional for Coleraine in Northern Ireland. Despite playing in a struggling team he scored 25 goals, and he was asked to stay on the following season. However he opted to return home, and resumed his career with Braddan having relinquished his professional status. In all it was estimated that he scored around 500 goals for his only local club during a career that lasted into the 1950s. He could score goals from all angles and was a superb header of the ball. His trademark was to receive the ball on the halfway line with his back to goal, turn his marker, surge forward and crack the ball into the net with power and accuracy from the edge of the penalty area.

Braddan won the Hospital Cup for the first time in 1936 with a 4–1 win over St George's at Tromode Park, helped by a hat-trick from another of Braddan best-ever players, outside left Henry Charlier. With Tim Tickle restored to the ranks for the 1936–37 season Braddan retained the Hospital Cup with a 5-1 thumping of Ramsey at Tromode Park (Tickle scoring twice), and were also crowned First League champions for the third time following a controversial and stormy victory at Peel in the final game. A decision to award Braddan a decisive penalty late in the game resulted in the referee and Braddan's FA Executive member needing a police escort from the ground to protect them from an angry mob.

The 1937–38 season was the greatest in Braddan's history, and at the end of it three major trophies adorned the Clucas’ Laundry boardroom. Playing highly skilful football they won their fourth First League title, and regained the Railway Cup with a magnificent 3–0 win over their greatest rivals Peel at Port St Mary. Two goals from Charlier and one from Tickle sealed Braddan's success on New Year's Day in front of a crowd of around 3,000. For the only time in the club's history Braddan secured the FA Cup, again beating Peel in the final which was played at Tromode Park. A penalty save by goalkeeper Bernard Fick was the catalyst for Braddan to surge into a 3–0 lead, with two goals from Tickle and a penalty from skipper George Bridson. Peel's late rally brought the score to 3–2, but Braddan held on to complete their greatest triumph. Only a narrow defeat in the Hospital Cup final – yet again Peel were the opponents – prevented Braddan from achieving the grand slam.

The 1938–39 season ended in disappointment and controversy. Braddan played arguably their best ever football during this campaign, and were unbeaten in the league with one match to play. That match was against their only challengers Peel, with Braddan needing just a draw to be crowned champions for the fifth time. The clubs failed to agree a suitable date for the game, which was eventually set to be played before the start of the 1939–40 season. Following the outbreak of War the match was never played, and the title was not awarded – denying Braddan a potential hat-trick of league titles.

During a decade plagued by regular controversy and bitterness in Manx football – usually involving Peel - Braddan was consistently acknowledged as a club that displayed great sportsmanship as well as footballing talent. Many Braddan players were regulars in the senior Isle of Man team throughout the 1930s. Mr Thomas ‘Tossie’ Clucas, a leading figure in establishing Braddan as a top club in Manx football, was also a highly respected representative for the club at the Isle of Man Football Association, where he served as vice president for many years and was later elevated to president.

== History 1945 to 1960 ==
The club closed down for the duration of the war, but was re-established in 1945. Many of the successful pre-War players returned, and Braddan reached the finals of both Cup competitions played that season. The FA Cup Final against Peel at KGV Park in Douglas resulted in a 1–1 draw, before Peel won the replay 2–1 at the same venue. The attendances for the two matches were 4,300 and 4,290 – the two highest attendances ever recorded for matches between two local clubs. It was Braddan's day in the Hospital Cup Final though, when they gained revenge on Peel with a 3–2 win at KGV Park, the goals coming from three pre-War heroes Percy Beedon, Alf Craine (penalty) and Tim Tickle.

Over the next few years the team gradually declined as age caught up with many of the great players from the 1930s. A brief return to former glories came with another FA Cup Final in 1951. Braddan put up a great fight against Rushen in front of 3,600 spectators at KGV Park, but a last-minute goal gave the southerners a 2–1 victory.

Braddan's first relegation followed in 1952, but by then the club was building for the future with a strong youth policy which was rewarded by winning the Cowell Cup that same season. They won the Division 2 title at the first attempt, and also secured the Hospital Cup which was contested by Division 2 clubs that season. The leading scorers were two of the stars of the previous season's Cowell Cup triumph, Brian Simpson and George ‘Jinx’ Caine. The latter, a speedy and skilful outside right, had already been selected for the senior IOM team at just 17 years of age, and the following season he was signed by Stockport County where he played for the next two seasons.

The first team made a wonderful start to the 1953–54 season on their return to Division 1. They won five of their opening seven league matches, scoring 40 goals, and received great acclaim for the quality of their attacking play. They finished in 6th place, and over the next few years they steadily consolidated their top flight status. In 1955 it was the turn of the Combination team to take the limelight as they brought the Junior Cup to Cronkbourne for the first time. They beat Ramsey 1–0 in the final which was played at Onchan Stadium.

The latter half of the 1950s was dominated by problems and tragedy off the field. In May 1956 the club pavilion, which dated back to pre-War days when cricket was also played on the ground, was destroyed by fire along with much of the club's property. A loan from the Isle of Man Football Association enabled the club to purchase a second-hand sectional building, which was assembled by club members and made ready for use as a clubhouse late in 1957. It served as the club's headquarters until 1988.

A dark day in the history of Braddan Football Club, and of the Isle of Man, came on 27 February 1958. Four club members – Tom Callow, Louis Cowin, Arthur Gleave and Arthur Tonkin – died in the Winter Hill air disaster which claimed a total of 35 Manx lives. The charter aircraft was taking local businessmen, mainly from the motor trade but also some from Clucas’ Laundry, on a day trip to Manchester to visit the Exide Battery Factory. A tragic navigational error in thick mist led to the aircraft crashing close to the summit of Winter Hill above Horwich, Lancashire. A memorial plaque to the four lost members is on permanent display in Braddan's clubhouse.

== History 1960 to 1970 ==
The 1960s was a decade of optimism, innovation and a new identity. In 1962 a club badge was designed and this was displayed on the team's shirts from the start of the 1962–63 season. It featured a motif of a swan and a football, inspired by the family of swans that inhabited the dam and river adjacent to the home pitch at Cronkbourne. A match report in the local press dubbed Braddan ‘The Swans’, and the new nickname was adopted and has been used ever since.

In the early part of the decade it was the Combination team who provided the excitement. During that era and up until 1967, the Combination teams were split into two regional leagues, with the champions of the North and South divisions playing a decider – effectively a Cup Final - for the Combination league title. Braddan reached the decider three consecutive seasons as ‘southern’ champions. In 1961–62 they lost to Peel, but gained revenge on the westerners with a 3–2 victory after extra time to clinch the title in 1962–63. That season was doubly successful as Braddan landed the Junior Cup for the second time, beating Laxey 4–0 in the final played at the Bowl. The following year they drew 3–3 with Ramsey after extra time in the league decider, so the title was shared.

The 1st Team made a steady start to the decade, but in 1963–64 they enjoyed their best league season since the halcyon days of the 1930s. They finished in fourth place in Division 1, indeed challenging for the title for much of the season. The following four seasons were something of an anti-climax as the team returned to the lower reaches of the table, but in 1968 Braddan became one of the first clubs in Manx football to engage a manager to take charge of football matters. Wilf Southern was appointed to the position, and the effect was immediate. The 1st Team, fitter and better organised, rose to a fifth-place finish in the 1968/69 season, and club stalwart Artie Kewley was named IOM Footballer of the Year – the only Braddan player to date to receive this honour.

The 1969–70 season was magnificent as Braddan suggested that they could finally recapture some of the glories of the 1930s. The 1st team finished third in Division 1, the highest position attained since the War, while the Combination team won both the Combination 1 league title and the Junior Cup, the latter with a 3–1 victory over St George's in the final at Castletown.

== History 1970 to 1980 ==
There was real optimism that the 1970s could be the decade when Braddan returned to the top of Manx football, but it was not to be. The decade in fact proved to be the most turbulent in Braddan's history with three relegations, three promotions, a sponsorship deal, and some shock news from Clucas’ Laundry over the club's future tenancy of the Cronkbourne pitch.

By this stage of Braddan's history the very close links between the club and the laundry had diminished, and in 1972 the club was first informed that the football field had been assigned by the company for future industrial development. At any stage from then onwards, the club could be given three months’ notice to leave the site. This was the beginning of what were to be 23 years of uncertainty and frustration before the club finally vacated the pitch and became established at a new venue.

It was a difficult time on the pitch too as the first team dropped from third place to bottom in two seasons, and were relegated in 1972. The Combination team won the Combination 2 title the following season as the 1st Team narrowly missed promotion, but Braddan bounced back to the top flight in style in 1974 as convincing Division 2 champions after a wonderful season.

After returning to the top division, another relegation followed in 1975–76. That season also saw Braddan record a 4–3 home win over Peel in the quarter-final of the FA Cup. Peel had been among the dominant sides in Manx football for several years prior to the match.

There was another revival in 1976–77 as a fine league season saw Braddan promoted once again. The highlight of that season however was the club's first success in the Woods Cup. A superb individual goal from 16-year-old Stewart Cain near the end sealed a sweet 2–0 triumph over local rivals Gymns in the final played at the Bowl.

The following season brought bitter disappointment as Braddan were relegated again on goal difference despite picking up 14 points from 20 games under the two points for a win system. Just one point separated the five teams fighting to avoid the second relegation spot, and the battle went to the last kick of the season.

A further promotion followed in the 1978–79 season when club captain Neil Mackie was named Division 2 Player of the Year. The reserves were runaway winners of the Combination 2 title, and Braddan's crop of promising teenagers reached the Cowell Cup Final. That match, played at Peel, was ultimately won 4–3 by St George's – but Braddan played a full part in what was hailed as one of the best and most exciting games seen in Manx football for years. During that season the club also secured its first sponsorship deal with Howstrake & Highlander Hotels, and following a relaxation of IOMFA rules the company's logo was allowed to be displayed on the club's shirts and on an advertising banner at the pitch.

Several players joined Braddan during the summer of 1979. Under the management of Malcolm Macdonald, the first team finished third in Division 1 during the 1979–80 season and qualified for the Railway Cup semi-finals, the club's first appearance at that stage of the competition since 1963. The team also reached the Hospital Cup semi-finals and finished fifth in Division 1, while the Combination team finished fourth. Goalkeeper Peter Corris, centre-back Neil Mackie, midfielder Keith Kermeen, and striker Chris Bass were selected for the senior Isle of Man squad.

== History 1980 to 1990 ==
The 1980s was a tough decade for the club, during which footballing matters were to become secondary to the problems of developing and funding a new ground. Clucas’ Laundry continued to allow the club the use of the Cronkbourne pitch on a season-by-season basis through the decade as an economic downturn had stalled their plans to develop the site. The club had taken out a lease on land owned by IOM Sports Council between Glencrutchery Road and Victoria Road in Douglas, but this land needed much work to be made ready for use as a football pitch and a clubhouse was still to be built. The many difficulties encountered with the development and funding of the new site were to threaten the very existence of the club over the following 15 years.

On the field, the great promise of the 1979–80 season was sadly not sustained and relegation followed in 1982. The Combination 2 title was secured for the third time in the 1982–83 season, but the 1st team missed out on promotion. The club bounced back in fine style in 1984–85, winning both the Division 2 and Combination 2 titles and returning to the top flight after a three-year absence.

A piece of history was made in 1985 as for the first time a junior Braddan team was established, entering the Under-14 league in the 1985–86 season. For the next three seasons the 1st team worked very hard to maintain their Division 1 status, and achieved a seventh-place finish in the 1986–87 season.

Following a decade of preparation, Braddan announced that the club would move to its new venue from the start of the 1988–89 season. The ground was named ‘Cronkbourne’ in order to preserve historical links with the original pitch, and a temporary changing facility was erected to be used until a clubhouse had been constructed.

The historic first match on the new ground was played against neighbours St George's on 17 September 1988, but it was already clear that the drainage system installed by a local contractor was inadequate. No further games could be played on the pitch, and Braddan spent two seasons as ‘nomads’ playing on pitches hired from Douglas Corporation. It was a very difficult and disappointing time for the club, compounded by financial problems through crippling loan repayments associated with the new ground. It was perhaps inevitable in such circumstances that the club suffered relegation at the end of the season after four seasons in the top division.

As a new decade dawned there was a welcome boost in the form of another Combination 2 title win in the 1989–––90 season, and later that summer Clucas’ Laundry agreed to the club making a short-term return to the Cronkbourne pitch. By that stage the clubhouse on the site had been destroyed, and portable units were installed on site to provide essential facilities. The pitch, vacant for over two years, was soon restored to good condition, and the club was to play there for five more seasons.

== History 1990 to 2000 ==
The 1990s was a decade of two contrasting halves for Braddan. For the first five years the club was based back at the Cronkbourne pitch and there was a steady improvement on the field with promotion, consolidation in Division 1, a thriving junior set-up and several trophies won. The second half of the decade saw the club finally complete the long-awaited permanent move to the new ground but also a decline in playing fortunes.

Having completed the return to the Cronkbourne ground, the highlight of the 1990–91 season was a Woods Cup Final appearance, but this ended in cruel disappointment. Braddan led for most of the match, only for Colby to snatch two goals in added time. There was more frustration the following season when the 1st Team missed promotion with a defeat to Ramsey in the last game, but under the management of Iain Laing the team were improving all the time. They reached the FA Cup semi-final, narrowly losing to St George's after a replay. The Combination team meanwhile brought silverware to the club by winning the Combination 2 title.

The 1992–93 season saw Braddan made it back to the big time, emulating the achievement of 1984–85 by winning both the Division 2 and Combination 2 titles. The 1st team remained unbeaten in the league until the very last match of the season, and were beaten finalists in the Gold Cup. The Combination team were Combination 2 champions for the third time in four seasons, and the recently established 14-16 and under-14 teams were both doing well.

The club was competitive in Division 1 for the next two seasons, achieving victories over top sides of the day such as Pulrose United, Rushen United and DHS Old Boys. The strength in depth of the squad was reflected in a strong Combination team for the 1994–95 season. They finished second in Combination 1 and won the Junior Cup for the fourth time in the club's history, beating the league champions DHS Old Boys 1-0 through a Brian Crook penalty in a final at the Bowl.

After so many years of frustration, the permanent move to the new ground off Victoria Road in Douglas was finally completed in the summer of 1995. The Isle of Man Sports Council had provided funding for a specialist contractor from the UK to be brought in to instal an effective drainage system, and a clubhouse was built overlooking the pitch at the Glencrutchery Road end of the ground. The enclosed nature of the pitch and surroundings provides character and a degree of shelter from the weather.

1995–96 was the first season in which three points were awarded for a win in Manx Football, and the Combination Team were the first Braddan team to score three points on the new pitch when they beat Foxdale 5-3 early in the season. The First Team had to wait until their fourth attempt for the first victory at their new home which came with a 2–1 win over Laxey. Despite some heavy defeats the team rallied to maintain their position in the top division, and over the next two seasons Braddan became known as the Houdini club for some seemingly impossible relegation escapes.

In 1996–97 only one club was relegated in order to even the numbers in the two divisions, and it was Braddan who finished next to bottom. However the highlight of that season was the performance of the Cowell Cup team. FA rules allowed Braddan to recruit players from other clubs who did not have a team in the competition, and they assembled a formidable squad that scored goals by the bagful in the group games. After a 4–1 away win over Ramsey in the semi-final, the team went through to the final against Castletown at the Bowl. Despite being billed as favourites to lift the trophy it was not quite to be. A 3–3 draw was followed by an agonising 3–2 defeat in the replay two days later – but the bonus was that some of the loan players were to join Braddan permanently soon afterwards.

The following season the 1st Team pulled off an even more unlikely escape when, having won only two league games all season, they went into the last two matches needing to win both to survive. A 2–0 win at Colby was followed by a dramatic 2–1 home win against Laxey in the last game to achieve another great escape. Their luck finally ran out in 1998–99 when despite a points tally of 17 – the highest since three points for a win were introduced in 1995 – relegation after six years in the top flight was confirmed after a defeat at Peel. The Combination Team had enjoyed more success during this period, and amassed an impressive 51 points in Combination 1 during 1998–99.

Hopes were high that the return to Division 2 would be short-lived, but after a good start to the 1999–2000 season the team finished the season in fifth place as the new millennium began.

== Honours ==
=== League ===
- First League champions (4): 1929–30, 1930–31, 1936–37, 1937–38
- Second League champions (1): 1923–24
- Division Two champions (5): 1952–53, 1973–74, 1984–85, 1992–93, 2016–17, 2024-2025

=== Cup ===
- IOM FA Cup (1): 1937–38
- Railway Cup (3): 1930–31, 1931–32, 1937–38
- Hospital Cup (4): 1935–36, 1936–37, 1945–46, 1952–53 (in 1952–53 the Hospital Cup was contested by clubs in Division 2)
- Woods Cup (3): 1976–77, 2016–17, 2024-2025
- Paul Henry Gold Cup (3): 2003–04, 2016–17, 2024-2025

=== Individual honours ===
- Footballer of the Year (1): Artie Kewley (1968–69)
- Division 2 Footballer of the Year (2): Neil Mackie (1978–79), Andy Glover (2016–17)
- Silver Boot (2): David Kinrade (2005–06), Andy Glover (2016–17)

=== League ===
- Combination League champions (2): 1962–63, 1963–64 (shared)
- Combination One champions (1): 1969–70
- Combination Two champions (9): 1972–73, 1978–79, 1982–83, 1984–85, 1989–90, 1991–92, 1992–93, 2015–16, 2016–17

==== Cup ====
- Junior Cup (4): 1954–55, 1962–63, 1969–70, 1994–95

=== Under 18 Team ===
- Cowell Cup (1): 1951–52

== Braddan AFC Timeline ==
- 1923: – Club founded, admitted to Second League. Pitch established on Clucas’ Laundry estate at Cronkbourne. Club nicknamed ‘Laundrymen’
- 1923–24: – Second League champions
- 1924: – Admitted to First League
- 1929–30: – First League champions
- 1930–31: – First League champions, Railway Cup winners
- 1931–32: – Railway Cup winners
- 1935–36: – Hospital Cup winners
- 1936–37: – First League champions, Hospital Cup winners
- 1937–38: – Braddan's greatest season. First League champions, FA Cup winners, Railway Cup winners
- 1938–39: – Led First League by one point from Peel with one game to play – against Peel. Clubs failed to agree on date for the deciding game. FA ruled game held over and played before start of 1939–40 season. World War 2 broke out, game was never played.
- 1939: – Club closed down for duration of World War 2
- 1945: – Club re-established following end of World War 2
- 1945–46: – Hospital Cup winners
- 1951–52: – Relegated to Division 2, Cowell Cup winners
- 1952–53: – Division 2 champions, Hospital Cup winners
- 1954–55: – Junior Cup winners
- 1956: – Club pavilion and property destroyed by fire
- 1957: – New clubhouse built by club members
- 1958: – Four members of the club died in the Winter Hill air disaster on 27 February
- 1962: – Swan and football motif designed as club emblem. Nickname ‘Swans’ adopted
- 1962–63: – Combination League champions, Junior Cup winners
- 1963–64: – Combination League champions (shared with Ramsey)
- 1968–69: – Artie Kewley named Footballer of the Year
- 1969–70: – Combination 1 champions, Junior Cup winners
- 1971–72: – Relegated to Division 2
- 1972–73: – Combination 2 champions
- 1973–74: – Division 2 champions
- 1975–76: – Relegated to Division 2
- 1976–77: – Promoted to Division 1, Woods Cup winners
- 1977–78: – Relegated to Division 2
- 1978–79: – Promoted to Division 1, Combination 2 champions, Neil Mackie named Division 2 Player of the Year
- 1981–82: – Relegated to Division 2
- 1982–83: – Combination 2 champions
- 1984–85: – Division 2 champions, Combination 2 champions
- 1988: – Moved to new pitch at Victoria Road. Drainage problems put pitch out of use after one game. Played two seasons on Douglas Corporation pitches
- 1988–89 – Relegated to Division 2
- 1989–90: – Combination 2 champions
- 1990: – Moved back to original pitch at Cronkbourne
- 1991–92: - Combination 2 champions
- 1992–93: - Division 2 champions, Combination 2 champions
- 1994–95: – Junior Cup winners
- 1995: – Established at Victoria Road pitch, clubhouse completed
- 1998–99: – Relegated to Division 2
- 2003–04: – Gold Cup winners
- 2005–06: – Promoted to Division 1. David Kinrade won Silver Boot
- 2006–07: – Relegated to Division 2
- 2015–16: – Combination 2 champions
- 2016–17: – Division 2 champions, Woods Cup winners, Gold Cup winners, Combination 2 champions. Andy Glover won Silver Boot and named Division 2 Player of the Year
- 2018–19: - 1st Team withdrew from Premier League due to lack of players. Combination team continued to play in Combination 1
- 2019–20: - Influx of players allowed the club to compete in both Division 2 and Combination 2
- 2022-23: - Promoted to Premier League
- 2023-24: - Centenary season
