= Ayre United A.F.C. =

Association football club on the Isle of Man

Coordinates: 54.367534°N 4.442149°W

- Full name: Ayre United Association Football Club
- Nicknames: The Tanges, Tangerines
- Founded: 1967
- Ground: Andreas Playing Fields aka The Fortress; Kirk Andreas, Andreas parish, Isle of Man
- Capacity: 150
- Chairman: Nigel Kermeen
- League: Isle of Man Football League Division One
- 2020–21: Premier League, 5th (Dec, 2020)
Home colours	Away colours

Ayre United A.F.C. are a football club based in the village of Kirk Andreas, Andreas parish, Ayre in the Isle of Man. They compete in the Isle of Man Football League Canada Life Premier League. They wear tangerine and black strips, and play home games at the Andreas Playing Fields in Andreas village.

They are coached by Steven Jauncey, Liam Christian and Elliott Cureton, as well as Eddie Cleator and Dan Fargher for the 2nd team.

The Ayre United Captain is Jamie Callister.

== History ==
The club was formed on 10 April 1967, and applied to play in the Isle of Man Football League Division Two for the 1967–68 season. They finished their first season on just four points. However, within two season they had their first trophy when they won the Woods Cup and the Fred Faragher Cup. The club have been Division Two champions four times. They were first promoted in 1976–77. After being promoted in 1986–87 they stayed in Division One and achieved the club's highest league placing in 1988–89 when they were Division One runners-up. In the 1995–96 season they finished as runners-up to the Police in Division Two and won both the Woods Cup and the Paul Henry Gold Cup. The club's highest achievement came in the 2002–03 season when they won the Manx FA Cup at The Bowl stadium in Douglas, beating St Georges 2–1. In the 2004–05 season they finished third in Division One.

As 2019 draws to an end, the last decade for Ayre United, to say the least can be classed as turbulent. The club started the decade in strong form winning the Woods Cup in 12/13 season, however that turned out to be the high point of the clubs recent history. As the midpoint of the decade arrived the Ayre United was arguably at the lowest point in the club's lucrative 50+ year history. As the legendary FA cup winning players came to the end of their careers, Ayre struggled fielding teams often having to forfeit game after game. The true extent of the struggle to field a team became apparent when even cult hero, Liam "Lugsy" Lord racked up some appearances. Despite this in the past two years, "the Tangerines" have begun their ascend from darkness. A combination of players returning to the club, upcoming exciting youth players, and top of the range management has given the club a new feeling of hope. The inside view is that the next decade will see a new group of players put their names into the history books. They currently aspire to compete in the Premier League next season.

== 2020–21 Season ==
As a result of COVID-19 pandemic, the 2019–20 season was unfortunately voided, meaning all the Tangerines hard work to get into a very promising position was about to go unrewarded. However, justice was done when Pulrose pulled out of the first division for 202-–21 season, meaning the FA were forced to promote the best team from Division 2. Ayre United were promoted.

== Facilities ==
The first clubhouse was an old RAF hut transported from Jurby airfield and opened in 1968. This was replaced and a new clubhouse opened at Easter, 1999. Ayre United were the first club on the Isle of Man to have floodlights, which were installed in 1972. A new club bar was opened on 28 May 2006. The club hope to build new changing facilities. The clubhouse is nicknamed the "Fortress".

== Teams ==
As well as the first team Ayre United also have reserves team that plays in the Isle of Man Football Combination.

== Honours ==
=== League ===
- Division Two champions (4): 1976–77, 1982–83, 1986–87, 2001–02
- Division Two runners-up (1): 1995–96
- Division One runners-up (1): 1989

=== Cup ===
- Manx FA Cup (2): 2002–03, 2021–22
- Woods Cup (8): 1969–70, 1970–71, 1976–77, 1983–84, 1987–88, 1995–96, 2001–02, 2012–13
- Paul Henry Gold Cup (1): 1995–96
- Fred Faragher Cup (3): 1969–70, 1978–79, 1979–80
- Manx Railway Cup (2): 2021–22, 2023–24
