= Douglas Royal F.C. =

Football club on the Isle of Man

- Full name: Douglas Royal Football Club
- Founded: 1981
- Ground: Ballafletcher; Douglas, Isle of Man
- Capacity: not known
- League: Canada Life Premier League
- 2018–19: Position 11/13
Home colours	Away colours

Douglas Royal F.C. are a football club from Douglas on the Isle of Man. They compete in the Canada Life Premier League and wear a white and navy kit. They play their home games at the Ballafletcher Sports Fields in Douglas at the site of the new Nobles Hospital.

== History ==
Formed as Pot Black F.C., the original club was formed in 1981 by a group of snooker-playing football enthusiasts, led by Pot Black Snooker Centre proprietor Peter Locke, who used to arrange friendly matches against business teams, such as KPMG and the IOM Police. After a series of friendly matches the players asked Locke to try to gain entry to the Manx FA. The application was placed and was successful. The team, named Pot Black, entered the 2nd division in 1982. When the snooker club was sold, Locke asked the new owners for sponsorship. When none was forthcoming, the club held a meeting in the Theatre Royal Hotel, Wellington Street, Douglas, and voted to change the name of the club to Douglas Royal. In 1986 the club was in some financial difficulties and looked like it may have to fold. A group of like-minded young men were looking for a new club and made the offer to help. Fresh sponsorship was available and the club added the number "87" to its name to celebrate the new start. The original colours were red shirts, with black shorts and socks but the new committee voted to change to the colours worn today. Since those early days, they have won the Hospital Cup once in 2004–05 when they beat St Georges, 3–2, in the final. Their first season in the First Division was 1989–90 when they finished sixth. They were relegated to Division Two in the 2002–03 season, but were promoted back to the top flight the next season as Division Two champions. They were again relegated in the 2007–08 season and currently play in Division Two

They have a reserve team that play in the Isle of Man Football Combination as well as junior and ladies teams.

Their main rivals are considered to be Gymnasium.

== Honours ==
=== Cup ===
- Hospital Cup (1): 2004–05
