= Castletown Metropolitan F.C. =

Association football club on the Isle of Man

Coordinates: 54.08126°N 4.65678°W

- Full name: Castletown Metropolitan Football Club
- Nickname: Town/Mets
- Founded: 1904
- Ground: Castletown Football Stadium, Malew Road; Castletown, Isle of Man
- Capacity: 2500 (Highest)
- Chairman: Mr P Quinney
- Manager: Mr R Mulligan
- League: Isle of Man Football League Division Two
- 2025–26: Division Two, 3/10
Home colours	Away colours

Castletown Metropolitan F.C. are a football club from Castletown on the Isle of Man. They compete in the Isle of Man Football League and wear a red-and-white kit. They play their home games at Malew Road in Castletown.

== History ==
Formed in 1904, the club is one of the most successful on the Isle of Man. They have been champions of the Isle of Man League eight times, including three consecutive seasons from 1922–23 to 1924–25 and won the Manx FA Cup six times.

They have spent most of their history in the top flight as Castletown FC, last winning the league in 1999. Since then, they have not been as successful, including relegation in 2005–06 on just five points, with one win, two draws, and 21 defeats; they scored 19 goals in 24 games and conceded 99. Town were promoted back to the top flight in 2009. After five years in the top flight, the "Town" were relegated again in 2014.

The club has a reserve team that plays in the Isle of Man Football Combination as well as a youth team, junior sides.

== Castletown Football Stadium ==
The club plays at Castletown Football Stadium on Malew Road in Castletown, which has a small covered terrace stand. The record attendance is over 2,500 for the first game played at the ground, against Liverpool Collegiate, in 1950. A club bar is located in the main stand.

== Honours ==
=== First team ===
==== League ====
- Division One champions (8): 1913–14, 1922–23, 1923–24, 1924–25, 1949–50, 1950–51, 1981–82, 1998–99
- Second League champions (1): 1913–14

==== Cup ====
- FA Cup (6): 1913–14, 1922–23, 1949–50, 1961–62, 1984–85, 1992–93
- Hospital Cup (3): 1923–24, 1968–69, 1978–79
- Railway Cup (7): 1911–12, 1920–21, 1923–24, 1949–50, 1959–60, 1976–77, 1984–85
- Woods Cup (1): 1960–61
- Cap Final (2): 1922–23, 1923–24
- Paul Henry Gold Cup (2): 2008–09, 2017–18

=== Reserve team ===
==== League ====
- Combination League One champions (5): 1957–58, 1970–71, 1972–73, 1990–91, 1998–99

==== Cup ====
- Junior Cup (4): 1951–52, 1953–54, 1970–71, 1978–79
- Cowell Cup (U18) (6): 1948–49(shared), 1975–76, 1987–88, 1996–97, 2008–09, 2009–10

=== Other teams ===
- 14/16 League champions (1): 1985–86
- 14/16 B League champions (2): 1998–99, 1999–00
- 15/17 B League champions (1): 2008–09
- 15/17 Plate (1): 2005–06
- 15/17 B Cup (1): 2008–09
- Women's Division Two champions (2): 2006–07, 2008–09
