= Douglas High School Old Boys A.F.C. =

Football club on the Isle of Man

Coordinates: 54.169582°N 4.463392°W

Douglas High School Old Boys A.F.C. (DHSOB AFC)
- Full name: Douglas High School Old Boys Association Football Club
- Nickname: Old Boys
- Founded: 1926
- Ground: DHSOB Football Ground, Blackberry Lane; Onchan, Isle of Man
- Capacity: 800 (Standing only)
- Chairman: Colin Purvis
- Manager: Karl Gartland
- League: Isle of Man Football League Division 2
- 2016–17: Premier League, 6/13
Home colours	Away colours

Douglas High School Old Boys A.F.C. (DHSOB AFC) are a football club from Onchan on the Isle of Man. They compete in the Isle of Man Football League and wear a blue and white kit. They play their home games at Blackberry Lane in Onchan.

== History ==
Formed in 1926, they have been Isle of Man Football League champions six times and won the Manx FA Cup ten times, including four consecutive FA Cup triumphs from 1964–65 to 1967–68.

They have a reserve team that play in the Isle of Man Football Combination.

== Facilities ==
DHSOB have a clubhouse and operate a campsite each year during the annual Isle of Man TT motorcycle racing.

== Records ==
- Best FA Vase performance: First round, 1989–90 (replay)

== Honours ==
=== League ===
- Division One champions (6): 1966–67, 1982–83, 1988–89, 1989–90, 1990–91, 1996–97

Division one combination champions:2011–12 2014–15, 2016–17

=== Cup ===
- Manx FA Cup (10): 1964–65, 1965–66, 1966–67, 1967–68, 1969–70, 1982–83, 1988–89, 1990–91, 1991–92, 1995–96
- Hospital Cup (3): 1987–88, 1994–95, 2008–09, 2013–14
- Railway Cup (5): 1988–89, 1991–92, 1993–94, 1995–96, 1999–2000
- Woods Cup (2): 2006–07, 2023-24
- Paul Henry Gold Cup (1): 2006–07
