= Peel A.F.C. =

Association football club on the Isle of Man

Coordinates: 54.217111°N 4.68696°W

- Full name: Peel Association Football Club
- Founded: 1888
- Ground: Peel A.F.C. Football Ground; Douglas Road; Peel Isle of Man
- Manager: Peter Kennaugh
- League: Isle of Man Football League Premier League
- 2023–24: Premier League, 2/13
Home colours	Away colours

Peel Association Football Club is a football club from Peel on the Isle of Man. The team competes in the Isle of Man Football League and the players wear red, white and black kits. The Peel A.F.C. plays its home games at the Peel A.F.C. Football Ground, on Douglas Road in Peel.

== History ==
Formed on 1 October 1888, they are the most successful club on the island with 31 league titles and 32 victories in the Manx FA Cup. They were the first winners of the Isle of Man Football League in 1897.

The club has a reserve team that plays in the Isle of Man Football Combination. They also have a ladies team and a Masters' team.

Amongst the many players who have appeared for the club, the two most famous are Tony Williams and Rick Holden. Williams scored 24 goals for the first team in 1958 in only ten appearances prior to compiling the Rothmans Football Yearbook and the Football League Club Directory. Holden, who appeared for Oldham Athletic and Manchester City amongst his professional clubs, scored 47 goals for Peel's first team in 48 appearances (1996–97) and later had two spells as manager. He resigned in August 2010 and was replaced by Peter Kennaugh. Daniel Bell took over as Director of Football during September 2020 to steady the ship.

== Stadium ==
Peel's ground is located on Douglas Road at the eastern edge of Peel. The ground has a small covered terrace.

== Honours ==
=== League ===
- First Division champions (31): 1896–97, 1906–07, 1921–22, 1931–32, 1932–33, 1933–34, 1934–35 1947–48, 1948–49, 1952–53, 1953–54, 1954–55, 1957–58, 1958–59, 1959–60, 1962–63, 1963–64, 1964–65, 1965–66, 1971–72, 1972–73, 1973–74, 1974–75, 1975–76, 1976–77, 1983–84, 1999–00, 2000–01, 2001–02, 2022–23, 2024-25
- Manx FA Cup (32): 1890–91, 1891–92 (Shared), 1908–09, 1926–27, 1929–30, 1932–33, 1934–35, 1936–37, 1938–39, 1945–46, 1947–48, 1948–49, 1952–53, 1953–54, 1957–58, 1958–59, 1959–60, 1960–61, 1962–63, 1963–64, 1968–69, 1972–73, 1973–74, 1974–75, 1976–77 1981–82 1983–84 1996–97 1998–99, 2006–07, 2015–16, 2018–19
- Hospital Cup (17): 1924–25, 1928–29, 1931–32, 1932–33, 1933–34, 1937–38, 1967–68, 1969–70, 1971–72, 1972–73, 1976–77, 1979–80, 1989–90, 1990–91, 1996–97, 1998–99, 2009–10
- Railway Cup (22): 1932–33, 1936–37, 1946–47, 1954–55, 1956–57, 1960–61, 1961–62, 1965–66, 1968–69, 1969–70, 1970–71, 1971–72, 1972–73, 1973–74, 1980–81, 1981–82, 1998–99, 2002–03, 2006–07, 2007–08, 2009–10, 2018–19
