= List of Manx people =

The Manx (Manx language: Ny Manninee) are an ethnic group from the Isle of Man in the Irish Sea in northern Europe. They are often described as a Celtic people on the basis of their recent Goidelic Celtic language, but their ethnic origins are mixed, including Germanic (Norse and English) and Norse-Gaelic lines.

== Actors ==
- Samantha Barks (born 1990), actor and musician
- Jamie Blackley (born 1991), actor
- Tom Holland (born 1996), actor of Manx ancestry
- Amy Jackson (born 1992), actress known for work in Indian films
- Evie Killip (born 1992), actor, BBC radio actor, voiceover
- Joe Locke (born 2003), actor
- Dursley McLinden (1965–1995) actor, dancer, and singer
- Anthony Quayle (1913–1989), actor of Manx ancestry

== Armed forces ==
- Robert Henry Cain (1909–1974), army major and Victoria Cross recipient
- Fletcher Christian (1764–1793), naval officer and mutineer on HMS Bounty
- William Garrett (1842–1916), Medal of Honor recipient in American Civil War
- Peter Heywood (1772–1831), naval officer and mutineer on HMS Bounty

== Artists ==
- Rayner Hoff (1894–1937), Manx-born Australian sculptor
- Bryan Kneale (1930-2025), sculptor
- Archibald Knox (1864–1933), designer
- Paul Lewthwaite (born 1969), sculptor
- Chris Killip (1946–2020), photographer and Harvard professor

== Musicians ==
- Dan Auerbach (born 1979), US musician of Manx descent
- Isla Callister, Manx folk musician and fiddle player
- Barry Gibb (born 1946), musician: Bee Gees
- Maurice Gibb (1949–2003), musician: Bee Gees
- Robin Gibb (1949–2012), musician: Bee Gees
- Ruth Keggin (born 1989), Manx Gaelic singer-songwriter
- Davy Knowles (born 1987), musician: Back Door Slam
- Harry Manx (born 1955), Manx-born Canadian musician

== Politicians ==
- Illiam Dhone (William Christian, 1608–1663), nationalist and politician
- Robert Quayle Kermode (1812–1870), Manx-born Tasmanian politician
- Dan Quayle (born 1947), Indiana Senator and Vice President of the United States, of Manx descent
- Sir Miles Walker (born 1940), politician: first Chief Minister of the Isle of Man

== Scholars ==
- Martin Bridson (born 1964), mathematician
- Jennifer Kewley Draskau (died 2024), historian, linguist, teacher and political candidate
- Edward Forbes (1815–1854), naturalist and botany professor
- John Kelly (1750–1809), lexicographer and Bible translator into Manx
- Sir Frank Kermode (1919–2010), professor of English
- Randolph Quirk (Lord Quirk, 1920–2017), linguistics professor and life peer

== Athletes ==
- Jonathan Bellis (born 1988), cyclist
- Mark Cavendish (born 1985), cyclist, winner of 35 Tour de France stages
- Mark Christian (born 1990), cyclist
- Aimee Cringle (born 1999), CrossFit athlete
- Conor Cummins (born 1986), motorcycle road racer
- Tara Donnelly (born 1998), gymnast
- Zoe Gillings (born 1985), snowboarder
- David Higgins (born 1972), rally car driver
- Mark Higgins (born 1971), rally car driver
- Darryl Hill (born 1996), snooker player
- Peter Kennaugh (born 1989), cyclist
- Tim Kennaugh (born 1991), cyclist
- Dan Kneen (1987–2018), motorcycle racer
- David Knight (born 1978), enduro motorcyclist
- David Lyon (born 1943), cricketer
- Keith McQuillan (1944–2022), footballer
- Dave Molyneux (born 1963), sidecar racer
- Millie Robinson (1924-1994), cyclist, winner of the first Tour de France Féminin in 1955
- Kieran Tierney (born 1997), Manx-born footballer, Scottish international

== Writers ==
- T. E. Brown (1830–1897), poet, scholar and theologian
- Hall Caine (1853–1931), novelist and playwright
- Cyril Clague (c. 1880–1946), poet and dramatist
- Mona Douglas (1898–1987), poet and folklorist
- Eliza S. Craven Green (1803–1866), poet
- Jane Holland (born 1966), poet, performer and novelist brought up on Man
- Sarah Holland (born 1961), writer, actress and singer
- Josephine Kermode (pseudonym Cushag, 1852–1937), poet and playwright
- Nigel Kneale (1922–2006), screenwriter
- Charlotte Lamb (Sheila Holland née Coates, 1937–2000), romantic novelist
- Sophia Morrison (1859–1917), folklorist
- Esther Nelson (1810–1843), poet
- Hilary Robinson (born 1972), children's author
- Christopher R. Shimmin (1870–1933), playwright and politician
- Thomas Shimmin (1800 – c. 1876–1879), poet and rag-gatherer
- Brian Stowell (1936–2019), writer, broadcaster and translator into Manx language
- George Waldron (1690 – c. 1730), topographer and poet

== Others ==
- George Q. Cannon (1827–1901), Mormon apostle
- Richard Costain (1839–1902), founder of Costain Group
- Colonel Routh Goshen (Arthur Caley, 1824–1889), giant and circus performer
- Nina Hunt (1932–1995), Latin American dance coach and choreographer
- Abdullah Quilliam (1856–1932), Victorian Muslim brought up on Man

== See also ==
- List of residents of the Isle of Man
- Lists of people by nationality
- Manx people
