= Middlebush =

Middlebush may refer to:

== Places ==
- Middlebush, New Jersey, in Somerset County
- Middlebush Brook (New Jersey), a tributary of Six Mile Run in Somerset County

== Other ==
- Middlebush Reformed Church, in Middlebush, New Jersey
- Middlebush Village Historic District, listed on the National Register of Historic Places in Somerset County, New Jersey
- Frederick Middlebush, thirteenth president of the University of Missouri in Columbia, Missouri
- The Middlebush Giant, also known as Colonel Routh Goshen
