= Clague =

Clague is a surname of Manx origin. Notable people with the surname include:

- Arthur Clague (1915–1983), Archdeacon of Man (the Isle of Man)
- Charles Clague (1890–1962), British-born Hollywood art director
- Cyril Clague (1880-–1946), Manx poet
- Sir Douglas Clague (1917–1981), British entrepreneur in Hong Kong
- Ewan Clague (1896–1987), American government official and economist
- Frank Clague (1865–1952), American politician from Minnesota
- John Clague (1842–1908) Physician and collector of Manx music
- John J. Clague (born 1946), Canadian authority in Quaternary and environmental earth sciences
- John Clague (1928–2004), American artist and sculptor
- Joyce Clague (1938–2024), Australian political activist
- Kale Clague (born 1998), Canadian ice hockey player
- Richard Clague (1821–1873), American landscape artist

== Also ==
- Mount Clague, British Columbia, Canada
- Clague Ridge, Mac. Robertson Land, Antarctica
- Clague Garden Estate, a public housing estate in Tsuen Wan, Hong Kong
