= Shimmins =

Surname of Manx origin

Shimmins is a surname of Manx origin. The name is derived from the Manx Gaelic McSimeen, meaning "little Simon's son". Notable people with the surname include:

- Bill Shimmins, Scottish-born Manx politician
- Kirk Shimmins (born 1994), Irish field hockey player

== See also ==
- Shimmin
