= List of people from the Isle of Man =

The Isle of Man, in the Irish Sea between Great Britain and Ireland, has been home to various notable people, including the following who were either born or raised on the island or moved there at some point.

== Born on the island ==
=== Academics ===
- Martin Bridson, FRS (born 1964), Whitehead Professor of Pure Mathematics at Oxford University, Head of the Clay Mathematics Institute.
- Jennifer Kewley Draskau (died 2024), Manx historian, linguist, teacher and political candidate
- Edward Forbes, FRS (1815 - 1854), Manx naturalist, mentor to Thomas Henry Huxley, and first Manx Fellow of The Royal Society

=== Actors ===
- Samantha Barks (born 1990)
- Jamie Blackley (born 1991)
- Amy Jackson (born 1991)
- Harry Korris (1891–1971)
- Dursley McLinden (1965–1995)
- Geraldine Somerville (born 1967)
- Joe Locke (born 2003)

=== Artists ===
- Howard Grey (born 1942), Advertising Photographer. Known for his early Windrush photographs 1962
- Rayner Hoff (1894–1937), sculptor, known for his architectural sculptures of war memorials in Australia.
- William Hoggatt (1879–1961), artist who moved to the Isle of Man in 1907
- Bryan Kneale RA (1930-2025), sculptor, known for teaching art in London and his works are exhibited in many countries around the world.
- Archibald Knox (1864–1933), art nouveau designer, known for his Celtic art and Liberty of London work.
- Paul Lewthwaite (born 1969), sculptor, an elected Fellow of the Royal British Society of Sculptors.
- Toni Onley (1928–2004), painter, born on the Isle of Man and moved to Canada in 1948.
- Chris Killip (1946–2020), photographer, known for works exhibited around the world, including In Flagrante, Killingworth, Seacoal, The Station & The Last Ships.

=== Military ===
- Major Robert Henry Cain VC (1909–1974), soldier, awarded the Victoria Cross during Operation Market Garden of the Second World War.

=== Musicians ===
- Mel Collins (born 1947), saxophonist, known for his session work with acts such as King Crimson and Camel
- Christine Collister (born 1961), contemporary folk singer
- Beckii Cruel (born 1995), Japanese idol
- Barry Gibb (born 1946), of the Bee Gees
- Maurice Gibb (1949–2003), of the Bee Gees
- Robin Gibb (1949–2012), of the Bee Gees
- William Kinrade (1769–1854), writer of Manx carols
- Davy Knowles (born 1987), blues guitarist and singer
- Harry Manx (born 1955), musician who blends blues and Hindustani classical music

=== Rulers and Politicians ===
- Illiam Dhône (also known as William Christian), (1608–1663), Manx patriot executed in 1663, great grandfather of Fletcher Christian.
- Sir Charles Kerruish OBE LLD CP MLC (1917–2003), first non-gubernatorial head of the Manx executive.
- Mark Wilks (1759–1831), Speaker of the House of Keys, later Governor of St Helena.

=== Sportspersons ===
- Neil Bennett (born 1951), rugby union player, won 7 caps for the England rugby union team.
- Mark Cavendish MBE (born 1985), road and track racing cyclist, winner of all Grand Tours points classifications and the 2011 UCI Road Race World Championships.
- Conor Cummins (born 1986), motorcyclist, four Isle of Man TT podiums.
- Tara Donnelly (born 1998), World, European and Commonwealth gymnast, Northern European Champion, Multiple British and Irish Championship wins
- Zoe Gillings (born 1985), snowboarder, seven FIS Snowboard World Cup podiums and three-times British Olympian.
- Mark Higgins (born 1971), rally driver, three-times winner of the British Rally Championship.
- David Higgins (born 1972), rally driver, winner of the 2004 British Rally Championship.
- Steve Joughin (born 1959), road racing cyclist, two-times winner of the British National Road Race Championships.
- Peter Kennaugh MBE (born 1989), road and track racing cyclist, gold medallist at the 2012 Olympic Games and the 2012 UCI Track Cycling World Championships.
- David Knight OBE (born 1978), motorcyclist, three-times winner of the World Enduro Championship.
- Alex Lloyd (born 1984), motor racing driver, winner of the 2007 Indy Pro Series.
- Dave Molyneux,(Born 1963) (sidecar rider). 17 Isle of Man TT wins
- A.P. Penketh (1865–1932), rugby union player, took part in the 1888 British Lions tour to New Zealand and Australia.
- Kieran Tierney (born 1997), first-team footballer for Celtic FC

=== TV and radio personalities ===
- Dr. Brian Stowell (1936–2019), radio personality and author, instrumental in the revival of the Manx Gaelic language. Well known nuclear physicist.
- Kevin Woodford (born 1950), TV chef and celebrity, presented Can't Cook, Won't Cook.

=== Writers ===
- Thomas Edward Brown (1830–1897), poet, scholar, and theologian
- Jennifer Kewley Draskau (died 2024), historian, linguist, teacher and political candidate
- Frank Kermode (1919–2010), noted literary critic
- Nigel Kneale (1922–2006), screenwriter
- Randolph Quirk (1920–2017), Lord Quirk, an eminent linguist

=== Other notable people ===
- Ned Maddrell (1877–1974), last native speaker of the Manx language
- Elizabeth Holloway Marston (1893–1993), credited with the invention of superhero Wonder Woman
- Sarah Kerruish (born 1964), director, producer, writer, and tech entrepreneur; Primetime Emmy Award Nominee (Moon Shot), General Magic, Miss Rumphius, Sweet Story

== Moved to the island ==
- Trevor Baines (1939–2022), businessman, jailed in 2009, for money laundering.
- Lillian Beckwith (1916–2004), author.
- Charles Birkin (1907–1986), 5th baronet and author.
- Sir Thomas Henry Hall Caine (1853–1931), a British novelist and playwright.
- Lord Cockfield (1916–2007), was born at Horsham in Sussex, England; but in later life had a house on the Isle of Man.
- Cal Crutchlow (born 1985), motorbike racer
- George Daniels (1926–2011), noted horologist (watch-maker).
- Doug Davies (1899–1987), rugby player 24 caps for Scotland, died in Peel.
- Roly Drower (1953–2008), activist, broadcaster, musician and poet
- Noel Edmonds (born 1948),businessman, and former television presenter, radio DJ, writer and producer.
- Florrie Forde (1876–1940), known as The Queen of Music Hall.
- Clinton Ford (1931-2009), English singer.
- George MacDonald Fraser (1925–2008), journalist, author, and screenwriter.
- Caro Fraser (1953-2020), maritime lawyer and novelist.
- Gerald Gardner (1884–1964), Father of Modern Wicca owned Witches Mill in Castletown.
- Russell Grant (born 1951), a television personality, astrologer, writer.
- Albert Gubay (1928–2016), businessman, founder of supermarket chain Kwik Save.
- Trevor Hemmings (1935–2021), businessman, famously owned Blackpool Tower.
- John Hick MP, JP (1815–1894), engineer, industrialist, art collector, politician and a director of the London North Western Railway.
- William Hillary (1771–1847), founder of the Royal National Lifeboat Institution and also arranged for The Tower of Refuge to be built in Douglas Harbour.
- Neil Hodgson (born 1973), the 2003 Superbike World Champion.
- Rick Holden (born 1964), manager of Peel football club on the Isle of Man; player with Oldham Athletic (twice) and Manchester City.
- Sheila Holland (1937–2000), prolific and best-selling romantic novelist, best known as Charlotte Lamb.
- Colin Horsley (1920–2012), New Zealand-born classical pianist but with Manx roots
- Andy Kershaw (1959–2026), BBC Radio presenter.
- Rupert de Larrinaga (1928-??), British Olympic skier.
- Cynthia Lennon (1939–2015), artist, writer and celebrity, ex-wife of former Beatle John Lennon, moved to the island in 1983 with her then husband Jim Christie.
- Nigel Mansell (born 1953), British racing driver.
- Mitch Murray (born 1940), songwriter, record producer.
- Bill Naughton (1910–1992), novelist and screenwriter.
- Chris Norman (born 1950), songwriter, member of soft rock group Smokie.
- Andrew Pitt (born 1976), World Supersport champion and MotoGP rider.
- John Rhys-Davies (born 1944), Welsh actor.
- Ronnie Ronalde (1923–2015), Music Hall performer.
- Alan Ruddock (1944–2012), schoolteacher, 6th Dan Aikidoka, introduced that martial art to Ireland, Aiki no Michi founder.
- Robert Sangster (1936–2004), businessman, racehorse owner/breeder.
- Mark Shuttleworth (born 1973), businessman, Spaceflight participant, and sponsor of Ubuntu Linux.
- Roger W. Smith (born 1970), noted horologist (watch-maker)
- Mollie Sugden (1922–2009), actress.
- James Toseland (born 1980), the double Superbike World Champion and former MotoGP rider.
- Adam Wakeman (born 1974), musician and son of Rick Wakeman.
- Rick Wakeman (born 1949), keyboard player in Yes and The Strawbs.
- Alan Warner (born 1964), novelist and screenwriter.
- Thomas "Buck" Whaley (1765–1800), member of the Irish House of Commons.
- John Whittaker (born 1942), businessman and property mogul, is chairman of The Peel Group which owns various properties (including the Trafford Centre and Liverpool John Lennon Airport).
- Sir Norman Wisdom (1915–2010), comedian and actor.

== See also ==
List of Manx people
