= Kewish =

Kewish is a Celtic surname of Manx origin. It is a shortened form of Mac Uais, meaning "the noble's son". The surname was attested as Kewish in 1618, Kevish in 1653 and Kewesh in 1683. As of 2016, there were 31 British people with the surname, compared to 93 in 1881. As of 2010, there were 149 people surnamed Kewish in the United States. Notable people with the surname include:

- John Kewish (d. 1872), last person executed in the Isle of Man
- John T. Kewish, American firearm inventor
- Tori Kewish, Australian darts player

== See also ==
- Manx surnames
