= Corlett =

Corlett is a surname of Manx origin. The name is an Anglicisation of the Gaelic Mac Thorliot, derived from an Old Norse personal name composed of two elements: the name Þórr and ljótr meaning "bright". Another opinion is that the Old Norse Þorliótr may mean "Thor-people". The name appears earliest in records as Corlett in 1504 and MacCorleot in 1511.

== People ==
- Andrew Corlett, Deputy Deemster of the Isle of Man
- Ann Corlett, Manx politician
- Charles H. Corlett (1889–1971), American major general
- Claire Corlett (born 1999), Canadian actress, daughter of Ian
- E. C. B. Corlett, British author, naval architect and consultant
- George Milton Corlett, 25th Lieutenant Governor of Colorado
- Ian James Corlett (born 1962), Canadian animation voice artist, writer, and musician
- John Corlett (attorney general) (born 1950), Her Majesty's Attorney General for the Isle of Man and ex officio Member of the Legislative Council
- Marama Corlett, Maltese actor and dancer
- Sam Corlett, Australian actor, environmentalist and model
- Samuel Corlett (1852–1921), English cricketer
- Simon Corlett (born 1950), cricketer
- William Corlett (1938–2005), English children's writer
- William Wellington Corlett (1842–1890), Delegate from the Territory of Wyoming
