= Lewthwaite =

Lewthwaite is a surname. Notable people with the surname include:

- Jimmy Lewthwaite (1920–2006), English rugby league player
- John Lewthwaite (1816–1892), New Zealand politician
- Paul Lewthwaite (born 1969), British sculptor
- Samantha Lewthwaite (born 1983), British jihadist
- William Lewthwaite, British Baronet
