= Cubbon =

Cubbon is a rare patronymic Manx Gaelic (Gaelg) surname, of exclusive origin from the Isle of Man.

== Origins and meaning ==
Cubbon is one of the rare Manx surnames, of either Irish Gaelic or Scottish Gaelic ancient origin. The surname Cubbon is a Manx contraction of the Irish surname ‘Mac Ghiobúin’ or the Scottish variant ‘MacGhiobúin’ meaning ‘son of Ghiobúin’. Ghiobúin itself means "pledge", "hostage", "noble youth" and "bright", "famous".

The Cubbon surname originally possessed the variations of the Gaelic Mac prefixes (Mac/Mc or M’), which were universally used in surnames on the Isle of Man. By the 17th century the prefix had almost completely disappeared. When the Mac prefix fell out of use, the final consonant became the first sound of the surname. Because of this, many Manx names characteristically begin with the letters C, K, or Q.

Cubbon and its numerous variations are commonly associated in Ireland with the descendants of Gilbert Fitzgerald, a younger son of John Fitzgerald, ancestor of the houses of Kildare and Desmond, or as variations of the sept name of the highland Scottish clan Buchanan, after the clan chief Gilbert Buchanan.

== Variations ==
As an old Gaelic name that exists in the three branches of the Goidelic languages, Cubbon has had numerous variations: M’Cubbon (1430), MacCubbon/ McCubbon/ MacCubbin/ McCubbin (1511), Cubbon (1605), Cubon (1649) and Cubbin (1645)

== Notable people ==
- Brian Cubbon (1928–2015), British senior civil servant
- Francis Cubbon (1882–1917), aerial observer and flying ace
- John Cubbon (1911–1997), British Army officer
- Mark Cubbon (1775–1861), British army officer and commissioner
- Mark Cubbon (administrator), British healthcare official
- William Cubbon (1865–1955), Manx nationalist, antiquarian, author, businessman, and librarian
