= McCubbin =

McCubbin is a surname. Notable people with the surname include:

- Bobby McCubbin (1868–1950), Australian rules footballer
- Carlos Cortijo McCubbin (born 1969), Peruvian footballer and manager
- Carrol McCubbin (1915–2013), American politician from Missouri
- Frederick McCubbin (1855–1917), Australian painter
- George McCubbin (1898–1944), South African Royal Flying Corps pilot
- Henry McCubbin (1942–2023), Scottish politician
- James McCubbin (born 1998), Uruguayan rugby union player
- Louis McCubbin (1890–1952), Australian war artist, landscape painter and art gallery director
- Megan McCubbin (born 1995), English zoologist
- Robert McCubbin (1902–1975), Canadian politician
- Russ McCubbin (1935–2018), American actor
- Sandy McCubbin (1886-?), Scottish footballer
- Todd J. McCubbin, American military officer

== See also ==
- McCubbins, surname
- Deacon Maccubbin (born 1943) American LGBTQ activist
