= Kennaugh =

Kennaugh is a surname of Manx origin. Notable people with the surname include:

- Peter Kennaugh, (born 1989), Manx racing cyclist
- Hudson Kennaugh, (born 1981), South African motorcycle racer
- Tim Kennaugh, (born 1991), Manx racing cyclist
