= Fargher =

Fargher may refer to:

Places

- Fargher Lake, Washington, unincorporated community

Surname

- Doug Fargher (1926–1987), Manx language activist
- J. A. Fargher (1901–1977), railways engineer in South Australia

== See also ==
Faragher
