= Farragher =

Farragher is a surname that is primarily found in English-speaking countries. Notable people with the surname include:

- Clare Farragher (born 1941), American politician in New Jersey
- Ger Farragher (born 1983), Irish hurler
- James Farragher (1873–1949), American college football player and coach
- John Farragher (1957–2025), Australian rugby league footballer
- Martin Farragher, Irish Gaelic footballer
- Michael Farragher, Irish Gaelic footballer
- Mike Farragher (1871–1934), American welterweight boxer

== See also ==
- Faragher, a surname of Manx origin
