= Shimmin =

Surname of Manx origin

Shimmin is a surname of Manx origin. The name is derived from the Manx Gaelic McSimeen, meaning "little Simon's son". Early records of the name include, MacSimon in 1366, MacShemine in 1430, and Shimin in 1614. Notable people with the surname include:

- Beth Shimmin (born 1987), Australian netball player
- Dominic Shimmin (born 1987), English footballer
- John Shimmin, Manx politician
- Christopher R. Shimmin (1870–1933), Manx playwright
- Thomas Shimmin (1800–1879), Manx rag gatherer and poet

== Other ==
- Shimmin, a hall of residence at the University of Leeds.
