= Teare =

Teare is a surname of Manx origin. Notable people with the surname include:

- Abby Sargent (née Teare; born 1977), Australian netball player
- Anthony Teare, last person in the British Isles to be sentenced to death
- Billy Teare, Irish storyteller
- Brian Teare (born 1974), American poet
- Cooper Teare (born 1999), American distance runner
- Debra Teare (1955–2018), American artist
- Donald Teare (1911–1979), British pathologist
- Eddie Teare (born 1948), Manx politician
- Ethel Teare (1894–1959), American silent film actress
- James Teare (1872–1909), Manx merchant navy officer
- Keith Teare (born 1954), American technology entrepreneur
- Kevin Teare (born 1951), American artist
- Nigel Teare (born 1952), British judge
- Scott A. Teare (born 1951), American scout
