= Cedar Grove Cemetery (Franklin, Somerset County, New Jersey) =

Cemetery in New Jersey, US

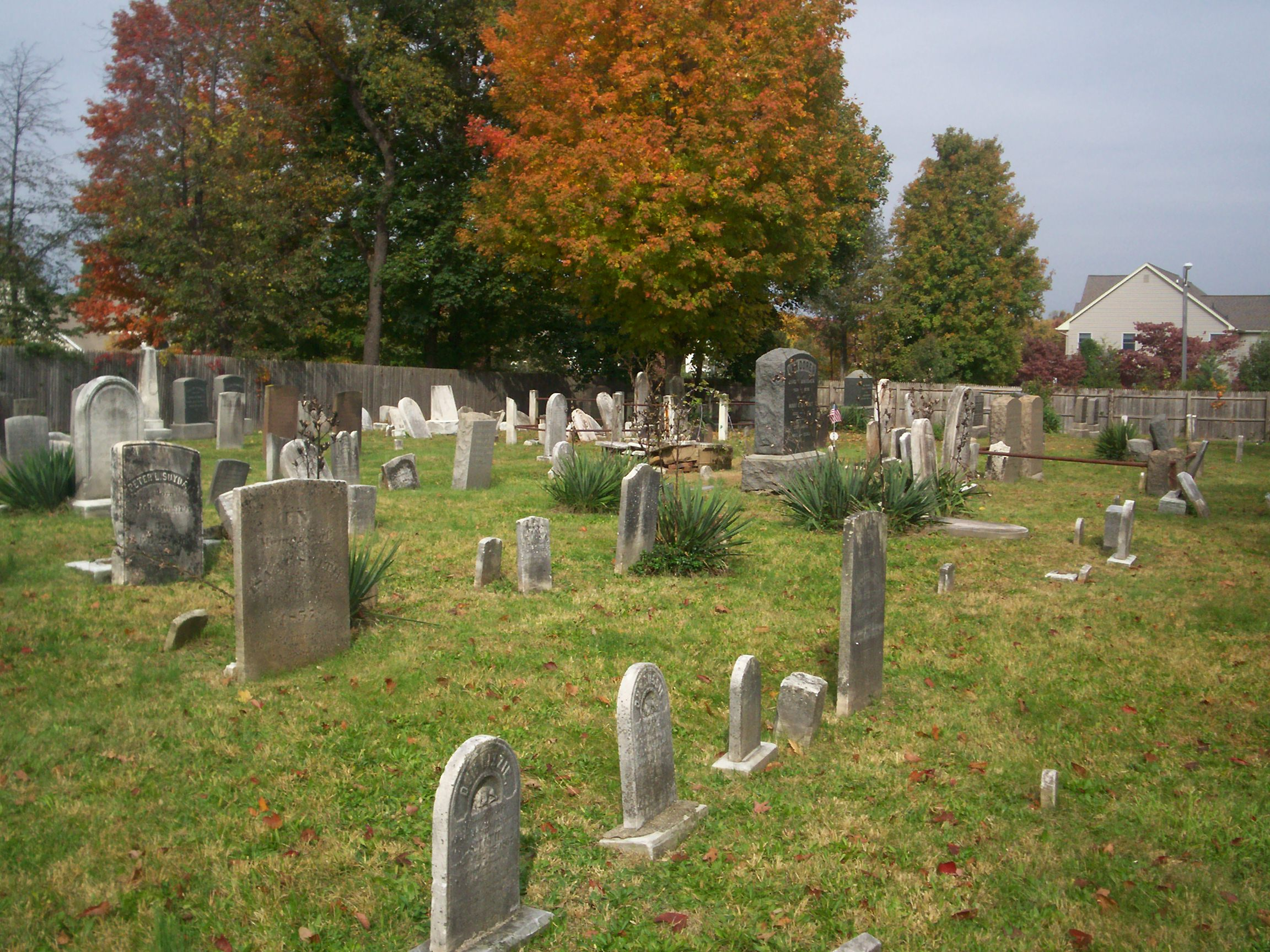
- Interactive map of Cedar Grove Cemetery

Details
- Location: Middlebush, New Jersey
- Country: United States
- Coordinates: 40°30′07″N 74°32′02″W
- Type: Public
- Find a Grave: Cedar Grove Cemetery

Cedar Grove Cemetery is in Middlebush, Franklin Township, Somerset County, New Jersey.

== History ==
In the 1940s the township of Franklin purchased and maintained 100 cemetery plots. The purpose was to create a Potter's Field. By 1975 the township only used 6 of the burial plots: they decided to sell the others.

== Burials ==
- Colonel Routh Goshen
- Welsh Family, said to have donated the land for this cemetery. The family lived on Welshs Lane in East Millstone, NJ.
