= Faragher =

Faragher is a surname of Manx origin. Notable people with the surname include:

- Danny Faragher (born 1947), American rock/soul musician
- Davey Faragher (born 1957), American bass guitarist
- Donna Faragher (born 1975), Australian, politician
- Edward Faragher (1831–1908), Manx poet, folklorist and cultural guardian
- Harold Faragher (1917–2006), English cricketer
- John Mack Faragher (born 1945), American historian
- Kathleen Faragher (1904–1974), Manx writer
- Ramsey Faragher (born 1981), British entrepreneur
- Tommy Faragher, American music composer and producer

== Other ==
- The Faragher Brothers, a musical group
- Faragher v. City of Boca Raton, 1998 United States Supreme Court case

== See also ==
- Farragher, people with this surname
- Fargher (disambiguation)
