= McCubbins =

McCubbins is a surname. Notables with the surname include:

- Chris McCubbins (1945–2009), American runner
- Mathew D. McCubbins (1956–2021), American political scientist

== See also ==
- Limberbutt McCubbins (born 2010), a cat registered as a candidate for the 2016 United States presidential election
- McCubbin
