= Colonel Routh Goshen =

American entertainer

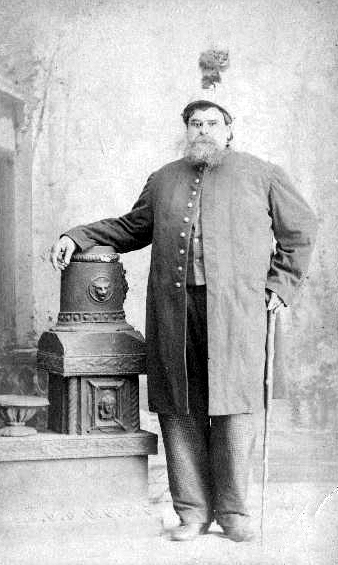
- Routh Goshen around 1900 in New Jersey
- Born: Arthur James Caley; 1824; Sulby, Isle of Man
- Died: February 12, 1889 (aged 64–65); Middlebush, New Jersey
- Resting place: Cedar Grove Cemetery
- Other names: Colonel Routh Goshon, Colonel Ruth Goshon, Derouth K. Goshon, The Middlebush Giant, The Arabian Giant, The Palestine Giant, The Sulby Giant, The Manx Giant, Arthur Crowley
- Occupation: entertainer
- Employer: P.T. Barnum
- Height: 7 ft 6 in (229 cm)

Routh Goshen, born Arthur James Caley (1824 – February 12, 1889), was most commonly known as Colonel Routh Goshen or the Arabian Giant or the Palestine Giant. He was billed as the tallest man in the world at 7 ft 11 in (2.41 m) and 620 pounds (280 kg) but was most likely no more than 7 ft 5 in (2.26 m) and 400 pounds (180 kg). His true origins were kept secret from the public during his performance years in the United States and were obscured by the many apocryphal biographies that were created to publicize him. His actual origins came out slowly after his death. His birth name was Arthur James Caley and he was born on the Isle of Man in 1824. His fictional biographies said he was born in Jerusalem on May 5, 1837. After his retirement in the 1880s, he settled in Middlebush, New Jersey, and gained the nickname the "Middlebush Giant".

== Early life ==
Routh Goshen was born Arthur James Caley in 1824 near Sulby, Isle of Man, to Arthur Caley and Anne Kewley. He was baptized on November 16, 1824, in Lezayre parish. He was one of twelve children the couple had. His sister Margaret Caley, moved to New York. In his teens, he began to grow very tall and continued to grow into his 20s. In May 1851, Caley visited friends at Liverpool and news articles were published about his size. At that time, Caley was described as being 7 ft 6 in (2.29 m). Shortly afterwards, Caley exhibited himself in Manchester, then in London and eventually in Paris, France. In February 1853, Caley's mother received a letter saying her son had died on February 1 in Paris, shortly after a life insurance policy had been taken out for him by his manager Etienne Lefevre. It is not known what happened for the next several years of Caley's life. He eventually moved to the United States and adopted the name Colonel Routh Goshen.

== Career ==
By at least 1859, Colonel Routh Goshen had already become known as the "Arabian Giant." By November 1863 he was being billed alongside Anna Swan, General Tom Thumb, and Commodore Nutt at Barnum's American Museum.

In 1876, he toured the United States with Commodore Nutt as part of the Lilliputian Comic Opera's performance of a version of the story of Jack the Giant Killer. In 1878, he toured the United States with P. T. Barnum's New and Greatest Show on Earth. He toured with Barnum's Circus again in 1879, 1880, and 1883. In Summer 1882, he performed at Atlantic City, New Jersey. In June 1884, Caley helped advertise clothing for a clothing house in Chicago, known for having a gigantic selection. In the following years, he exhibited himself at several dime museums. In July 1888, a fire occurred at Caley's farm near Middlebush that destroyed several buildings and his collection of memorabilia.

== Marketing and identity ==
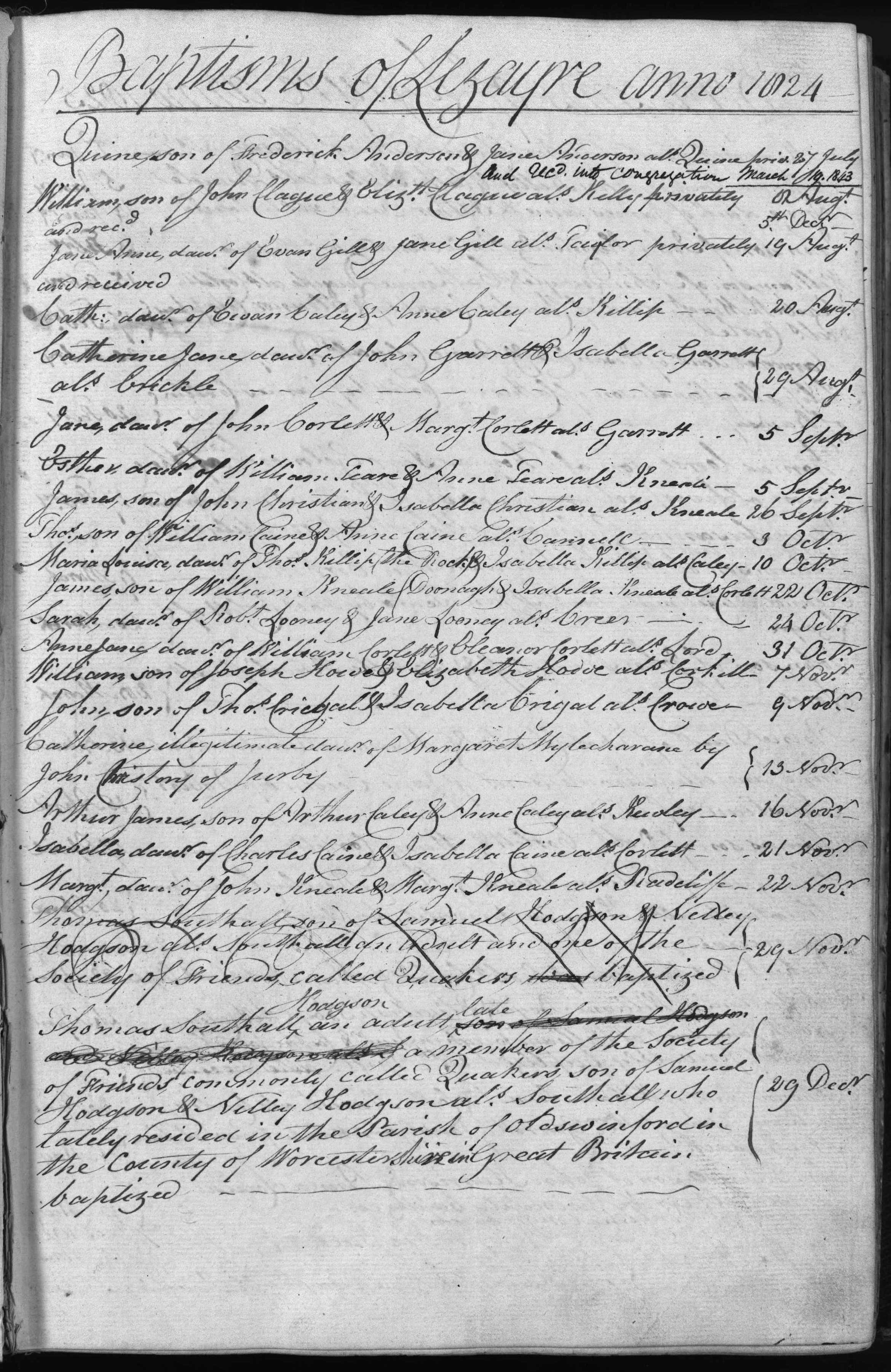
Caley's baptism record, dated 16 November 1824

Arthur James Caley performed under several names during his exhibition career. After arriving in the United States, he adopted the stage name Colonel Routh Goshen, although contemporary advertisements also spelled the name Colonel Ruth Goshen and Derouth K. Goshon. By 1859 he was being advertised as the Arabian Giant. When he appeared at P. T. Barnum's Barnum's American Museum in November 1863, he was promoted as a 27-year-old giant born in Jerusalem.

A promotional biography published in 1870 presented a fictional account of Caley's life. It claimed that he had been born on 5 May 1837 to a Hebrew mother and a Turkish father, stood 7 feet 11 inches (2.41 m), weighed 635 pounds (288 kg), had a 64-inch (160 cm) chest and a 58-inch (150 cm) waist, and had served in the Ottoman Army, the Crimean War, the Second Italian War of Independence, and under Maximilian I of Mexico. The biography also described his arms as "the thickness of saplings" and stated that his blows carried "the ponderosity of the hammer of Thor".

During his career, advertisements also billed Caley as the Palestine Giant and later the Middlebush Giant.

Routh Goshen in the Brooklyn Eagle in 1871

The connection between Caley and Colonel Routh Goshen remained largely unknown for many years after his death in 1889. During the last months of his life, he reportedly told others that his real name was Arthur Crowley, that he had been born on the Isle of Man, and that the stories previously told about his life were untrue.

In 1962, the Journal of the Manx Museum published "The Mystery of Arthur Caley, the Manx Giant", identifying Colonel Routh Goshen as Arthur James Caley. The New York Times published an article about Caley's life in 1965. In 1980, the Middlebush Reformed Church received a letter stating that Goshen's real name was Arthur James Caley, that he had been born in the village of Bride on the Isle of Man, and that his parents were John and Margaret Caley. The information was later supported by Isle of Man census records and parish registers, which matched the details given in the letter.

== Marriage and family ==
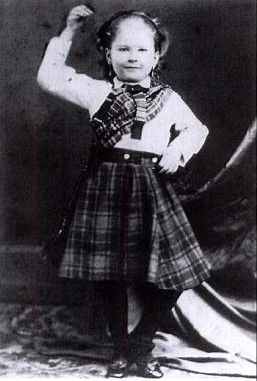
Frances Goshen Sylvester (1868-1949) the adopted daughter of Routh Goshen

Caley married at least three times and was divorced twice during his lifetime. In March 1859, at about 35 years of age, he married Clestina N. Townes of Montreal in Massachusetts.

About ten years later, around 1869, at about 45 years of age, Caley married Augusta White, a German snake charmer whom he had met while touring with his show. The couple settled on Caley's farm near Clyde, New Jersey. During their marriage, fellow circus performer John Sweet and his wife, bareback rider Elizabeth Sebastian, lived with the Caleys for a time. While Caley was away on tour, White left him with Sweet. The pair took $600 worth of silver, $70,000 worth of bonds, a goat, a horse, and a wagon from Caley's farm. After about ten years of marriage, Caley filed for divorce around January 1879.

About fifteen months later, on April 18, 1880, at about 56 years of age, Caley married Mary Louise Welch of Elgin, Illinois, in Manhattan. Welch had first met Caley several years earlier through her cousin, a woman who had toured with his show as a fat lady. After their marriage, the couple settled in Middlebush, New Jersey. About four years later, Caley filed for divorce, alleging that Welch had been unfaithful. Welch accused him of relationships with three other women, and the divorce was finalized in 1884. During the proceedings, it was reported that Caley was not Arabian but had been born in Lancaster, England, and that he claimed to be 65 years old.

Caley also adopted two daughters, Lillie Goshen, who later married clog dancer Martin Robert, and Frances Goshen Sylvester (1868–1949). Frances reportedly travelled with Caley in Europe and was said to have danced before Queen Victoria.

== Legal issues ==
Goshen later encountered Sweet again, the man who had robbed him. Goshen threatened to kill Sweet with a pistol he brandished, and then beat Sweet with a cane. At the time of the assault Sweet owned a farm in New Brunswick, New Jersey that Goshen had lost due to a mortgage, which Sweet had paid off. A warrant was issued for Goshen's arrest and he was ordered to appear before a court in September.

== Death and burial ==
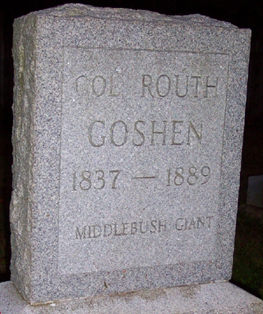
Colonel Routh Goshen tombstone

Caley died at his farm on Amwell Road in Middlebush, New Jersey on February 12, 1889. He had been living in Franklin Township for about 15 years. By the time of his death, he had accumulated a valuable estate. In his will he left everything to his adopted daughter Francis then the wife of Henry Sylvester. If she were to die without any heirs, Caley wanted his estate to go to his sister, Margaret Caley Gelling of Rochester, New York. His will was contested by his ex-wife Mary Welch who was living with family in Elgin, Illinois.

His funeral was described in the following manner:

The farm house of the dead giant was thronged with villagers long before the hour fixed for the funeral. The remains had been placed in a coffin eight feet long and three feet wide. It was covered with cloth and had been specially made for the deceased. After the funeral services were over the coffin was borne on the shoulder of eight sturdy farmers to a wagon which was standing in the road about 100 yards (91 m) from the house. Undertaker Van Duyn said he could not find a hearse large enough to hold the giant's coffin. The pall bearers had a hard struggle in carrying the remains down the incline leading from the house to the road and when they deposited the coffin in the wagon, beads of perspiration stood out on their foreheads. A large crowd followed the remains to the Middlebush cemetery, where the interment took place.

He was originally buried without a tombstone for fear his body would be dug up and put on display. The cemetery is the Cedar Grove Cemetery in Middlebush, New Jersey. His tombstone reads "Col. Routh Goshen, Middlebush Giant, 1837-1889".

== Aliases ==
- Arthur James Caley
- Colonel Routh Goshen
- Colonel Routh Goshon
- Colonel Ruth Goshon
- Colonel Ruth Goshen
- Derouth K. Goshon
- The Middlebush Giant
- The Arabian Giant
- The Palestine Giant
- The Sulby Giant
- The Manx Giant
- Arthur Crowley
