= William Kinrade =

William Kinrade (1769-1854) was a writer of Manx carols who lived at Ballachrink, Maughold, in the Isle of Man.

Kinrade is one of the most significant writers of Manx carols (or ‘carvels’), in an era when these are now considered to be the only surviving source of literature in Manx. To him have been attributed a number of carvels, including the following:

- Lhig da’n slane seihll cur clashtyn / Let the whole world harken
- O uss vriw bioee as merriu / Thou judge of living and dead
- The Question-and-Answer carol.
- The Carol of Warning and Example to Young Men
- She corrym rish yn earish shoh
- Cre'n stayd va dooinney hoshiaght
- Carval Noah / Noah's Carol
- Carval Susannah / Susannah's Carol

The majority of these carvels were most notably published in Carvalyn Gailkagh (Manx Carols) by A. W. Moore in 1891. However, ‘Lhig da’n slane seihll cur clashtyn‘ (‘Let the whole world harken’) had been published earlier, in 1870. It is believed that this carvel was sung to the tune of ‘Mish ta’n Billey Roauyr,’ as the tune's title appears to be a corruption of the first line of the second verse: ‘T’eh mysh ny biljyn reurey‘ (‘He is digging about the trees’).

A translation of Kinrade's poetry has most recently appeared in Manannan’s Cloak: An Anthology of Manx Literature by Robert Corteen Carswell:

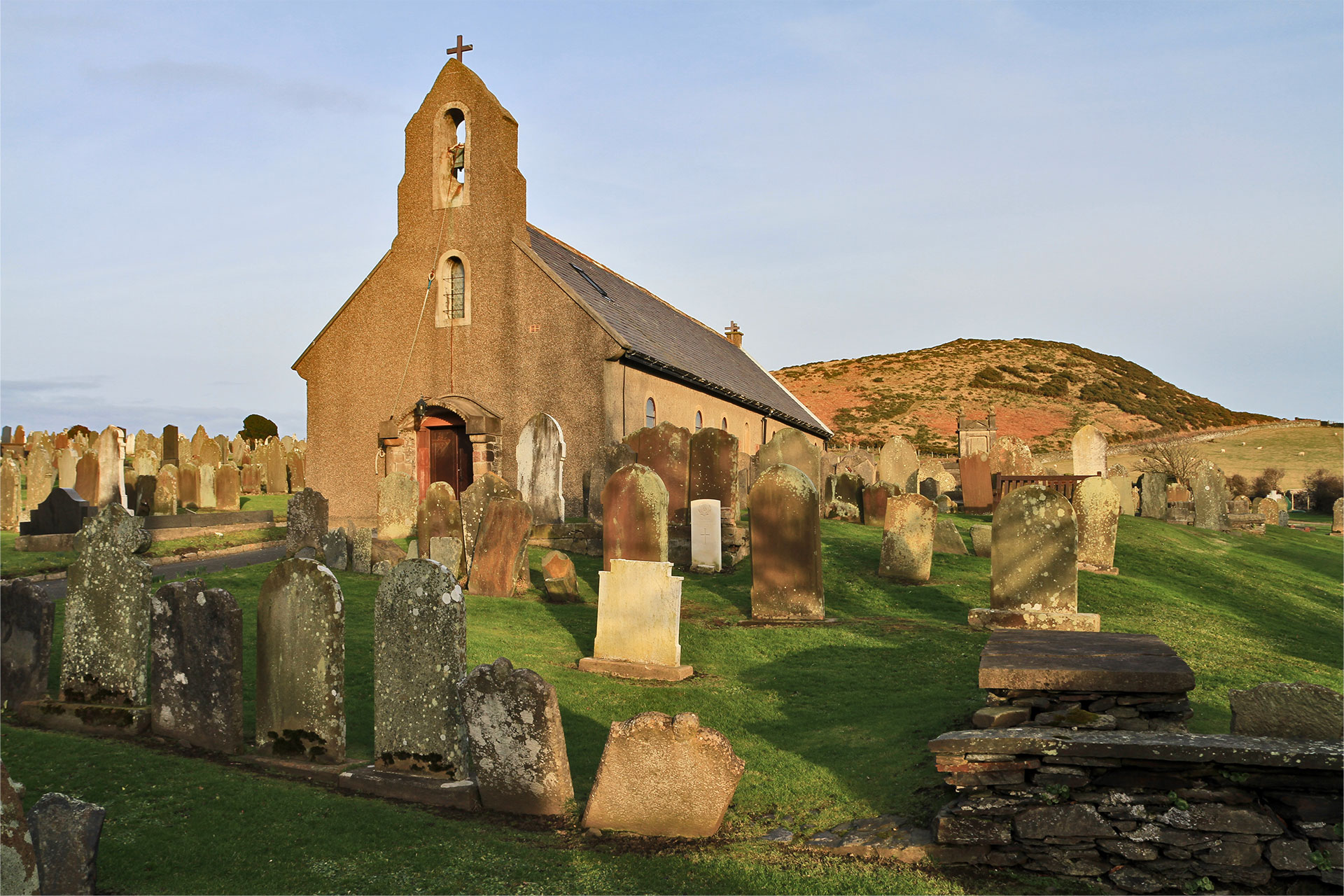
Kirk Maughold, where it is likely that Kinrade's carvels were first sung

Lhig da’n slane seihll cur clashtyn / Let the whole world give hearing [extract]
Shiuish king lheeah, chyndaa-Jee Bee’n traa eu leah ec kione Ny kirp eu ta gaase appee Dy hyndaa reesht gys joan Nagh bee shiu lhiggey shaghey Ta’n tra dy siragh roie Yn noid ta still er arrey As kiarit shiu y stroie.	You grey-headed ones, turn Your time will soon be at an end Your bodies are growing ripe To turn again to dust Don’t be procrastinating Time is running hurriedly The enemy is still on watch And intent on destroying you.
