= Manx surnames =

Location of the Isle of Man.

Surnames originating on the Isle of Man reflect the recorded history of the island, which can be divided into three different eras — Gaelic, Norse, and English. In consequence most Manx surnames are derived from the Gaelic or Norse languages.

== Origins and sources ==
During the first period of recorded history the island was occupied by Celtic speaking peoples and later Christianised by Irish missionaries.

By the 9th century Vikings, generally from Norway, ruled the island: Old Norse speaking settlers intermarried with the Gaelic speaking native population, and Norse personal names found their way into common Manx usage.

By the 13th century the island became a Scottish possession, but passed back and forth between Scotland and England for a hundred years before finally coming under British rule, resulting in open immigration from the occupying country.

Under the English many surnames introduced to the island were translated into Manx, while many indigenous Manx surnames became Anglicised. Immigration from Ireland brought Hiberno-Norman surnames to the island as well.

Very few Manx surnames are recorded prior to the arrival of the Stanleys in 1405. The majority of early surnames are recorded in the Manorial Rolls dating from 1510 to 1513. More recent sources of surnames are Parish records from the beginning of the 17th century.

Arthur William Moore analysed the origin of Manx surnames in use at the beginning of the 19th century: of 170 surnames, about 100 (65 percent) are of Celtic origin while about 30 (17.5 percent) were of Norse-Gaelic origin.

== Patronymics and the loss of the prefix Mac ==
Patronymic names were formed by the use of the Gaelic prefix Mac to the father's name. The "Irish" O (Ó) never took root among Manx names.

In the early 16th century, the Mac prefix was almost universally used on the island but by the 17th century, it had almost completely disappeared. The pronunciation of the prefix Mac was unstressed, so that the final consonant became first consonant in the second element of the name (the father's personal name). When the Mac prefix fell out of use, the final consonant became the first sound of the surname. Because of this, many Manx names characteristically begin with the letters C, K, or Q, for example Cubbon, Kelly and Quayle.

Patronymic forms of personal names beginning with element Giolla "servant of" (for instance, MacGillchrist) underwent a transformation of their own; the prefix Mac and the element Giolla were contracted into Myley. For example, MacGillchrist became Mylechreest or Mylchreest.

== Matrilineal Ine ==
Prior to the mid-17th century there were many instances of female surnames using the prefix Ine, a Gaelic contraction meaning "daughter," cognate to the Irish prefixes Ní and Nic and Scottish Gaelic Nic, derived from iníon "daughter". From the mid-17th century onwards the prefix generally fell out of use. According to J. J. Kneen, there are several instances of feminine surnames using IIne as late as the early 19th century,

== The use of "Alias" ==
During the 18th century, formal documents in English (for example parish registers and probate records) made use of the Latin "Alias" to incorporate the maiden name of a married woman or widow, for example "Mr. Robert Kelly of the Rock in the parish of Marown and his wife Isabel Kelly als Clucas".

== Surname comparisons tables ==
=== 1986 surname rank by occurrences ===
The following table shows the top ten surnames found in the 1986 telephone directory on the Isle of Man. The ten names are compared to the 1881 their census ranking.

1986	Surname	1881
1	Kelly	1
2	Corlett	4
3	Quayle	2
4	Moore	7
5	Cain (Caine was 47)	3
6	Christian	5
7	Kneale	18
7	Teare	14
9	Clague	6
10	Shimmin	16
11	Stevenson	18

=== 1881 surname rank by occurrences ===
The following table ranks Manx surnames by occurrences in the 1881 census. See footnote for the legend to the table. (Note: The Total column represents the total number of people with the surname. The Frequency column represents the percentage of people on the Isle of Man with this surname. The Index column represents the probability of finding the surname in Man, compared to the probability of finding it in the rest of Great Britain. A number 1 in this column shows that there is the same chance of finding this surname at random on the Isle of Man as there is in whole of Great Britain (a 2 would show twice as much, and a 10 shows ten times as much).)

Surname	Total	Frequency	Index
Kelly	2118	3.9041	35.6479
Quayle	1349	2.4866	375.7242
Corlett	1139	2.0995	368.3342
Moore	944	1.7401	8.7017
Clague	882	1.6258	456.7345
Christian	873	1.6092	162.2616
Cain	790	1.4562	70.1231
Quirk	637	1.1742	246.7653
Watterson	632	1.1650	359.6836
Cannell	612	1.1281	260.8807

=== 1881 rank by population index ===
This table lists the surnames of the 1881 census which have the highest percentage of appearing on the Isle of Man. The important column in this table is the Index column. This table shows the most "Manx" surnames in Great Britain. See the previous footnote for the legend to the table.

Surname	Total	Frequency	Index
Carine	78	0.1438	538.3023
Kewish	89	0.1641	528.5036
Comish	108	0.1991	497.0087
Clague	882	1.6258	456.7345
Costain	304	0.5604	448.7085
Corkill	611	1.1262	444.9785
Kennaugh	243	0.4479	442.7036
Faragher	295	0.5438	424.0943
Kissack	323	0.5954	423.5510
Shimmin	609	1.1226	421.2784

== See also ==
- Family name, description of family names
- History of the Isle of Man, Manx history
- "Has Anybody Here Seen Kelly?"
