= Keith McQuillan =

Manx footballer (1944–2022)

Personal information
- Full name: Keith John McQuillan
- Date of birth: 16 December 1944
- Place of birth: Isle of Man
- Date of death: 30 April 2022 (aged 77)
- Place of death: Isle of Man
- Position: Forward

Senior career*
Years	Team	Apps	(Gls)
1960–1965	Michael United	86	(91)
1965–1981	Peel A.F.C.	225	(332)
Total		311	(423)

International career
1965–1974	Isle of Man	12	(14)
- * Club domestic league appearances and goals

Keith McQuillan (16 December 1944 - 30 April 2022) was a Manx footballer who played as a forward. He played for Michael United and Peel A.F.C.. Internationally, he represented the Isle of Man national team, scoring 14 goals in 12 appearances from 1964 to 1975.

He was active until 1981, and made one final appearance in 1988 for Peel A.F.C.'s centenary.

== Club career ==
=== Michael United ===
McQuillan is first mentioned as playing for Michael United in the 1960–61 season. United had been demoted in the prior season and managed to place 5th in their initial year back in Division Two. Nonetheless, they performed better in the Hospital Cup Final, which was a Second Division trophy at the time, and the 16-year-old McQuillan netted his first of many crucial goals in finals as Michael triumphed over Malew with a score of 2–1 at Castletown.

Two seasons later, he began consistently scoring, achieving at least 25 goals while also assisting M. Craine for the sole goal in the 1963 Hospital Cup final against Ronaldsway. Since United did not participate in the Cowell Cup, McQuillan played for Ramsey, earning another winners' medal after the Northerners beat Corinthians 2–0 at Onchan.

=== 1960s ===
On September 6, 1965, the club's Committee reviewed and approved his request to join Peel. Nineteen days later, he made his first appearance, overshadowed on that occasion by Harold Crellin, who netted five times (with McQuillan contributing two) in an 11–1 thrashing of the team formerly known as Ronaldsway Aircraft Company. This was the beginning of numerous achievements from McQuillan, that helped Peel maintain the Division One championship for a fourth consecutive year, and his goal from a mistake by D.H.S.O.B.'s goalkeeper Ian Prentice secured the Railway Cup with a 2–0 victory on New Year's Day at Castletown.

The 1966–67 season was not fruitful for Peel, even with McQuillan scoring 25 goals by December's end. This included an impressive five-goal performance at Rushen United during a 7–5 victory on November 5, 1966, and throughout the 1970s, he would accumulate over 50 goals against Peel's fierce competitors. With McQuillan contributing around 50 goals for the first time, the team had to wait until their final match of the 1967–68 season to secure another trophy. Goals from McQuillan and Wilfred Lowey, without any response from D.H.S.O.B., brought the Hospital Cup Final back to Peel after a 30-year absence.

In the 1968–69 season, although McQuillan was absent for 11 matches, he still scored during all three Cup finals against Pulrose United, D.H.S.O.B. (with two goals), and Castletown. In the latter Hospital Cup final, he was again in Michael United's kit due to a shirt issue with Peel, leading to the borrowing of Michael's attire; however, the green uniforms did not bring good fortune, as Castletown triumphed 5–2. His worth is highlighted by the Association Cup first round match against Second Division Union Mills that year; after two consecutive draws while he was away, he returned to score five goals in the 7-0 second replay and added another five the following week in the next round at Onchan, totaling 15 goals in the tournament. As the decade shifted, much remained consistent.

=== 1970s ===
On New Year's Day, he started the scoring unexpectedly in the Railway Cup final against D.H.S.O.B., and he netted both goals in the end-of-season Hospital Cup Final against Pulrose United. In the 1970–71 season, McQuillan contributed 26 goals by the end of November, surpassing a total of 50 for the entire season. Pulrose was on track to secure their fourth consecutive League championship, finishing with Peel as runners-up, and the two teams faced each other in all three senior Cup finals. In April of that year, McQuillan fractured his forearm during a 1–1 draw between the teams, but managed to recover sufficiently to participate in the Hospital Cup final replay six weeks later. His two goals helped give Peel an early 3–0 advantage, although Pulrose ultimately overcame them to win 5–3.

During the season of 1971–72, Peel successfully ended Pulrose United's dominance in Division One, claiming the first of what would be six consecutive titles. On New Year's Day, they also retained the Railway Cup, marking the fourth of six consecutive victories, with McQuillan scoring the third goal in a 4–0 win against Castletown. That season, he achieved his best performance for the Island team, scoring five times in a 9–1 rout of R.A.F. London. In the next two years, McQuillan reached his peak performance. In the 1972–73 season, he set a record with 69 goals (70 if we count his goal for the Senior Island team against Old Holts on Good Friday 1973), finding the net in all but one Division One match, which was Peel's only loss of the season in a 3-2 match against the competitive Pulrose United. The Railway Cup Final is fondly remembered by spectators who saw Peel triumph 6–4 against their southern rivals Rushen United, where McQuillan hat-trick was outshone by Gareth Jones, who netted all four goals for the losing side. In the Association Cup final, Keith scored once, while Tony Scambler completed a hat-trick, leading Peel to a decisive 6–0 victory. On May 27, 1973, he recorded his thirteenth hat-trick of the season as Peel claimed a 4–2 victory over Laxey, achieving the 'Grand slam' for the second time, exactly 40 years after they had gone unbeaten throughout the 1932–33 season.

Peel continued to establish club records in the 1973–74 season. They won every match during the calendar year 1973 and maintained this streak to a total of 46 consecutive victories, and eventually 52 matches without defeat, by the time they faced Malew for the Hospital Cup Final. It was anticipated that they would secure another trophy However, even though McQuillan started the scoring with a well-executed goal, it turned out to be the southern team's day, with Gordon and Alfie Lowey each finding the net in a 5–2 win. It had been an excellent year for both McQuillan and the club. He netted more than 50 goals for the third time within four seasons, which earned him the title of the Island's 'Footballer of the Year.' He was absent during the closely contested Railway Cup final victory against D.H.S.O.B., but returned just four days later to score six goals at St. George's during the preliminary round of the Association Cup. In the final of that same tournament, McQuillan powered home a volley, as Peel managed to fend off the increasing threat from Rushen United, winning the match 3–2.

During the initial nine matches of the 1974–75 season, he netted twenty-three goals, significantly contributing to Peel's journey toward another unbeaten League season. However, it was his young teammate David Craine who garnered attention in the Association Cup Final, achieving a hat-trick in a triumphant 6–1 victory over Pulrose United. Throughout the next two seasons, McQuillan maintained an impressive average of 1.5 goals per game, although the 1976 Railway Cup Final hinted at a shift in circumstances. He netted two goals that had initially put Peel ahead 2–1 with under 10 minutes to go, yet Rushen United mounted a remarkable comeback, ultimately winning 5–2 in extra time, with Neil Shimmin scoring a hat-trick and accumulating a similar tally of goals for the southerners during his remarkable career. The 1976–77 season would mark his twelfth successive year as Peel's top scorer. Peel captured three out of the four senior trophies in the 1976-77 campaign; however, at the start of the next season, McQuillan suffered an injury, and with Robert Teare opting to participate in the Combination ranks, the team lost its former dominance. On January 21, 1978, he was declared fit to play again and scored six goals (with Robert Teare adding three) as Ayre United was overwhelmed, losing 10–1 at Andreas. By the end of that season, both players had led the team to a second consecutive Combination and Junior Cup double.

== International career ==
McQuillan played 12 games and scored 14 goals for the Isle of Man national football team, in a career lasting from 1964 to 1975.

== Career statistics ==
=== Club ===
Appearances and goals by club, season, and competition. Only official games are included in this table.
Club	Season	League		FA Cup		Hospital Cup		Railway Cup		Total	
Club	Season	Apps	Goals	Apps	Goals	Apps	Goals	Apps	Goals	Apps	Goals
Michael United	1960–61	18	5	2	0	2	1	0	0	22	6
Michael United	1961–62	18	8	1	0	0	0	0	0	19	8
Michael United	1962–63	15	22	3	3	1	0	0	0	19	25
Michael United	1963–64	16	36	1	0	0	0	1	0	18	36
Michael United	1964–65	19	20	1	1	0	0	0	0	20	21
Total		86	91	8	4	3	1	1	0	98	96
Peel	1965–66	20	30	4	6	1	0	3	3	28	39
Peel	1966–67	18	30	1	1	0	0	2	1	21	32
Peel	1967–68	19	38	5	8	5	1	2	0	31	47
Peel	1968–69	14	17	5	15	1	1	1	1	21	34
Peel	1969–70	15	15	4	1	3	5	1	1	23	22
Peel	1970–71	19	41	6	6	2	3	2	1	29	51
Peel	1971–72	19	23	1	0	3	0	2	3	25	26
Peel	1972–73	20	34	5	14	4	6	2	4	31	58
Peel	1973–74	19	23	4	11	6	6	1	0	30	40
Peel	1974–75	18	25	3	1	4	2	3	1	28	29
Peel	1975–76	19	23	3	5	3	5	2	2	27	35
Peel	1976–77	17	28	4	5	5	5	1	0	27	38
Peel	1977–78	0	0	0	0	1	0	0	0	1	0
Peel	1978–79	4	4	0	0	0	0	0	0	4	4
Peel	1979–80	1	0	0	0	0	0	0	0	1	0
Peel	1980–81	3	1	0	0	0	0	0	0	3	1
Total		225	332	45	73	38	34	22	17	330	456
Total		311	423	53	77	41	35	23	17	428	552

== Honours ==
=== Michael United ===
- Hospital Cup (2): 1960–61, 1962–63

=== Ramsey ===
- Cowell Cup (1): 1962–63

=== Peel ===
- First Division champions (7): 1965–66, 1971–72, 1972–73, 1973–74, 1974–75, 1975–76, 1976–77
- Manx FA Cup (5): 1968–69, 1972–73, 1973–74, 1974–75, 1976–77
- Hospital Cup (5): 1967–68, 1969–70, 1971–72, 1972–73, 1976–77
- Railway Cup (6): 1968–69, 1969–70, 1970–71, 1971–72, 1972–73, 1973–74
