= Richard Clague =

American painter

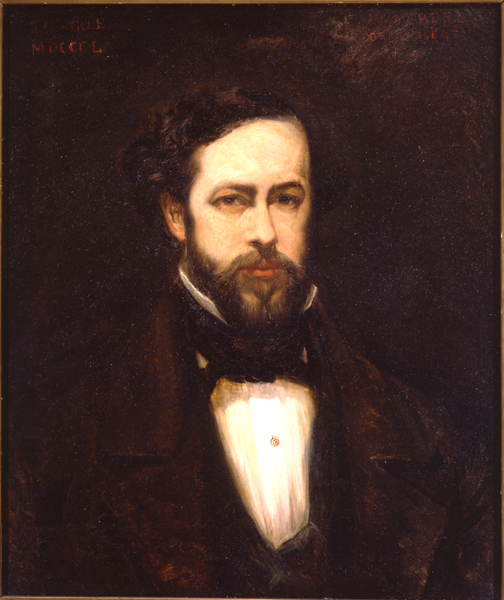
- Richard Clague Jnr, Self-portrait
- Born: 11 May 1821; Paris, France
- Died: 1873 (aged 51–52); North Carolina, US
- Education: Leon D. Pomarède; Horace Vernet; Antoine Auguste Ernest Herbert; Jean-Auguste-Dominique Ingres; École des Beaux-Arts, Paris
- Known for: Painter
- Style: Bayou School

Richard Clague, Jr. (1821–1873) was an American landscape artist.

== Life and career ==
Richard Clague Jr was born on 11 May 1821 in Paris, France to Richard Clague Sr. and Justine de la Roche. His parents were descended from wealthy New Orleans families and kept an apartment in Paris, where Richard Jr was born. The family returned to Louisiana when Richard was very young. However, when his parents separated, Richard and his brothers, Charles and Eduoard, went to live in Paris with their mother.

In 1836, along with his brother, Eduoard, Richard was sent to school in Geneva to study painting with Jean-Charles Ferdinand Humbert (1813-1881) where Richard developed a preference for landscape painting. Following his father's death in December, 1836, he received a substantial inheritance which allowed him to continue his studies. He and his brother returned to Paris and began studying with Leon D. Pomarède. Later, Richard studied with Horace Vernet, Antoine Auguste Ernest Herbert and Jean-Auguste-Dominique Ingres who recommended him to the École des Beaux-Arts in Paris.

After completing his studies, he travelled to Morocco, Algiers and other destinations in the Middle East where he kept a sketchbook (now in the New Orleans Museum of Art, Louisiana) and developed an interest in Oriental subject matter.

Although he was largely trained in Europe, he settled in Louisiana, becoming part of the "Bayou School". He regularly painted with William Buck, Marshall Smith and their contemporaries, who often chose to paint similar scenes. Clague's home on Bayou Street, near the Spanish Fort, was a popular retreat for artists.

Clague opened a studio in New Orleans in 1862, influencing artists such as William Aiken Walker and his pupil, William H. Buck.

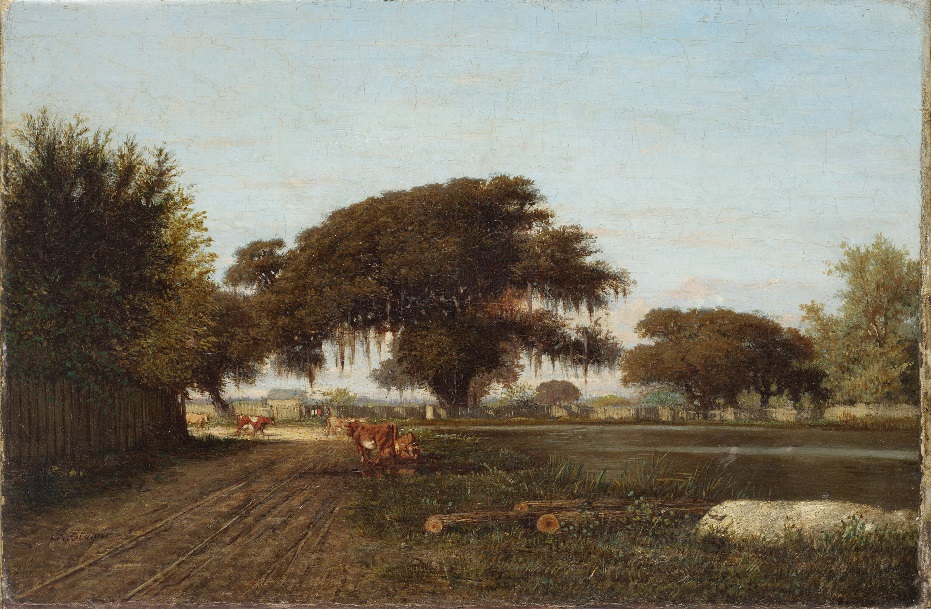
Farm in St.Tammany

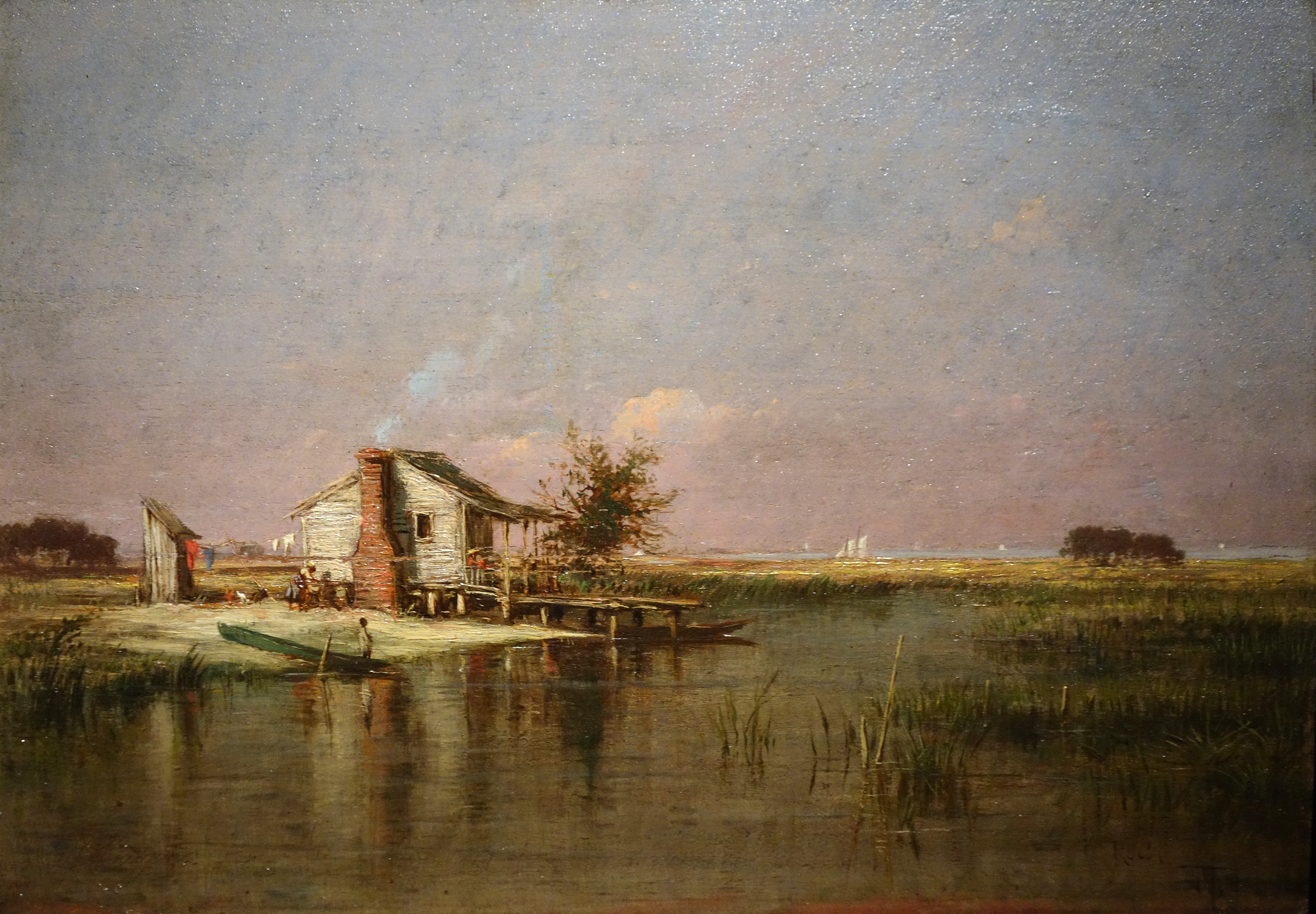
Fisherman's Camp

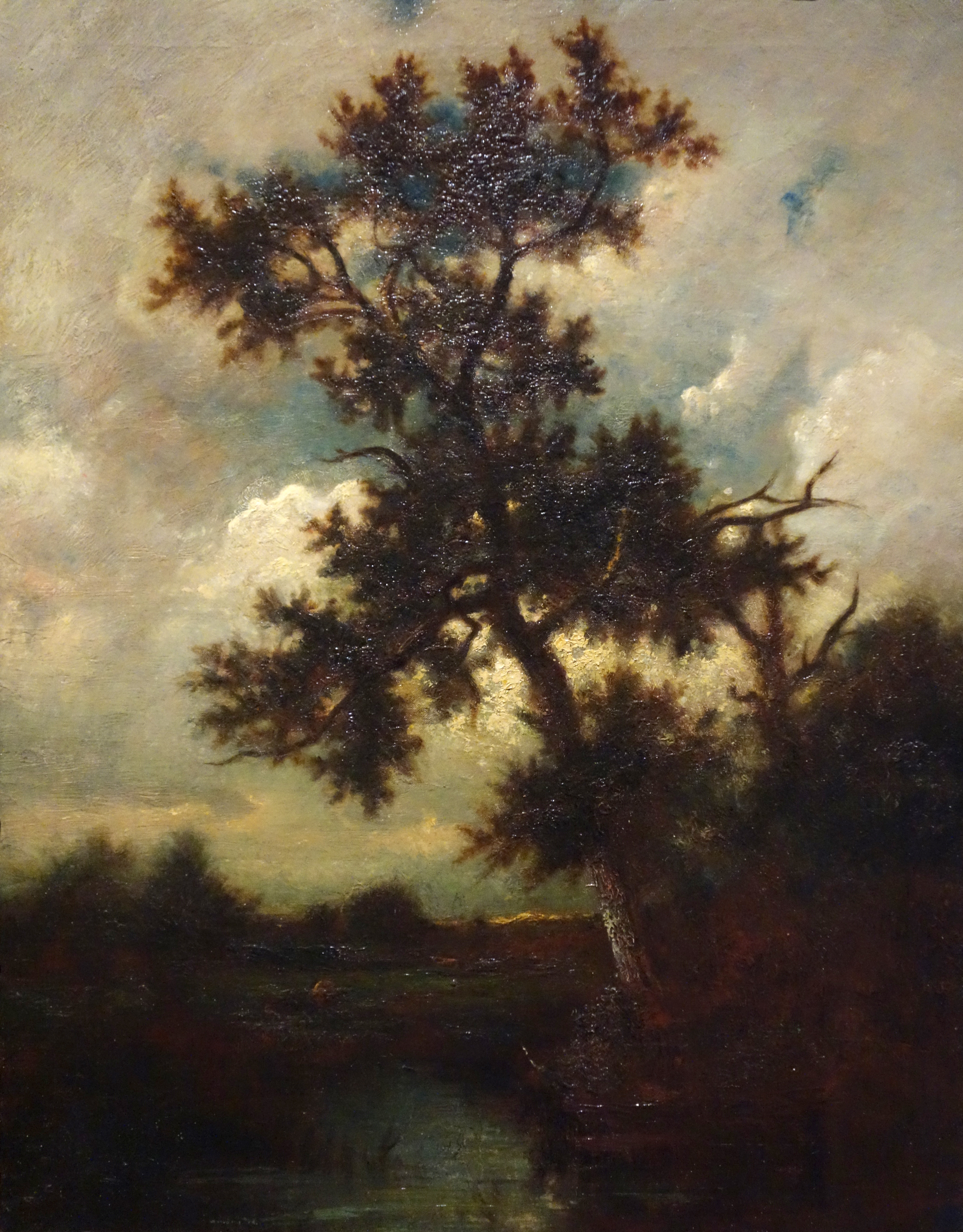
Portrait of a Twisted Tree

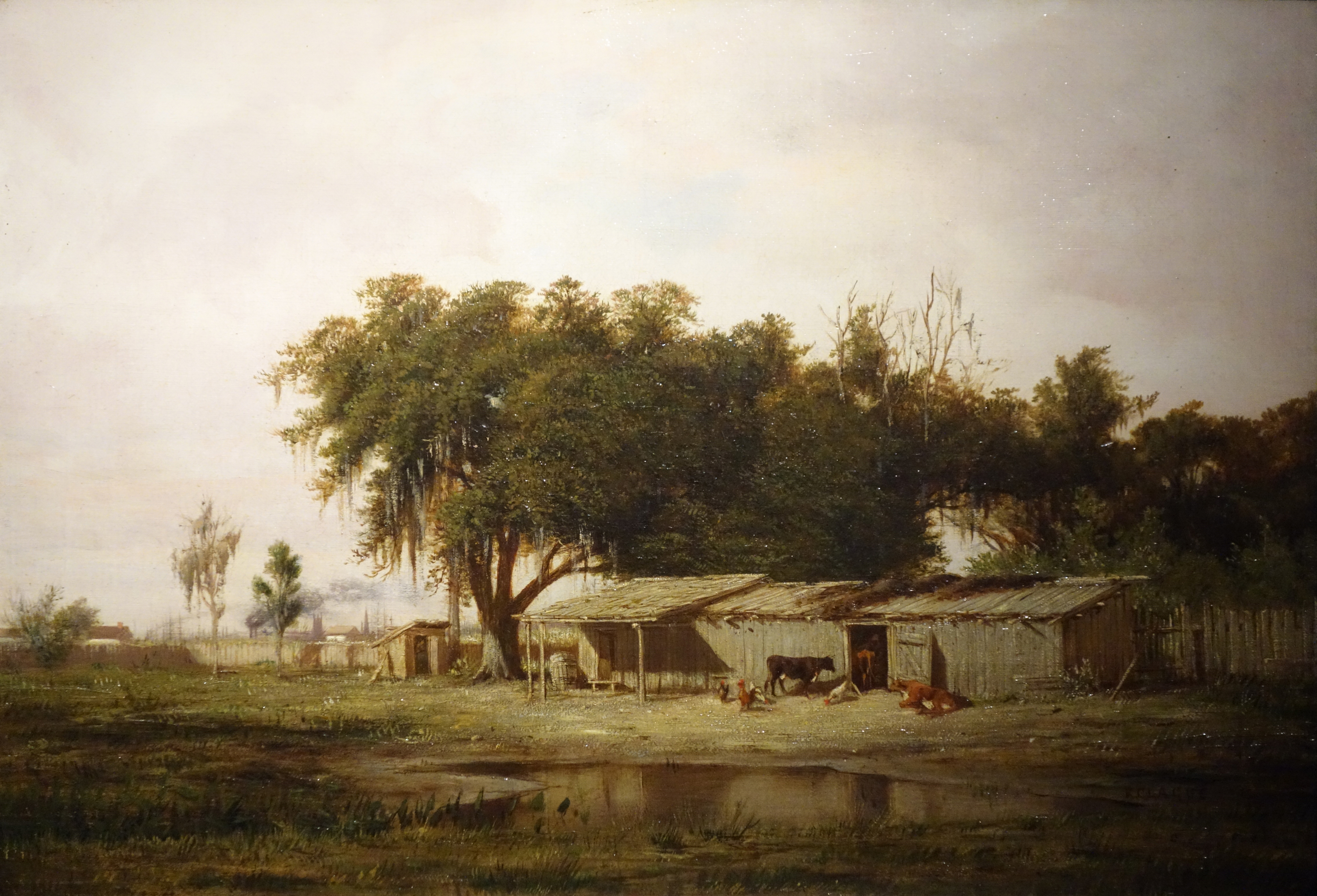
Back of Algiers

== Books ==
- Roulhac Toledano (1974), Richard Clague, 1821-1873, New Orleans Museum of Art
- Ackerman, G.M., American Orientalists, ACR, 1994; especially p. 272

== See also ==
- List of Orientalist artists
- Orientalism
