= Middlebush, New Jersey =

Populated place in Somerset County, New Jersey, US

- Census-designated place
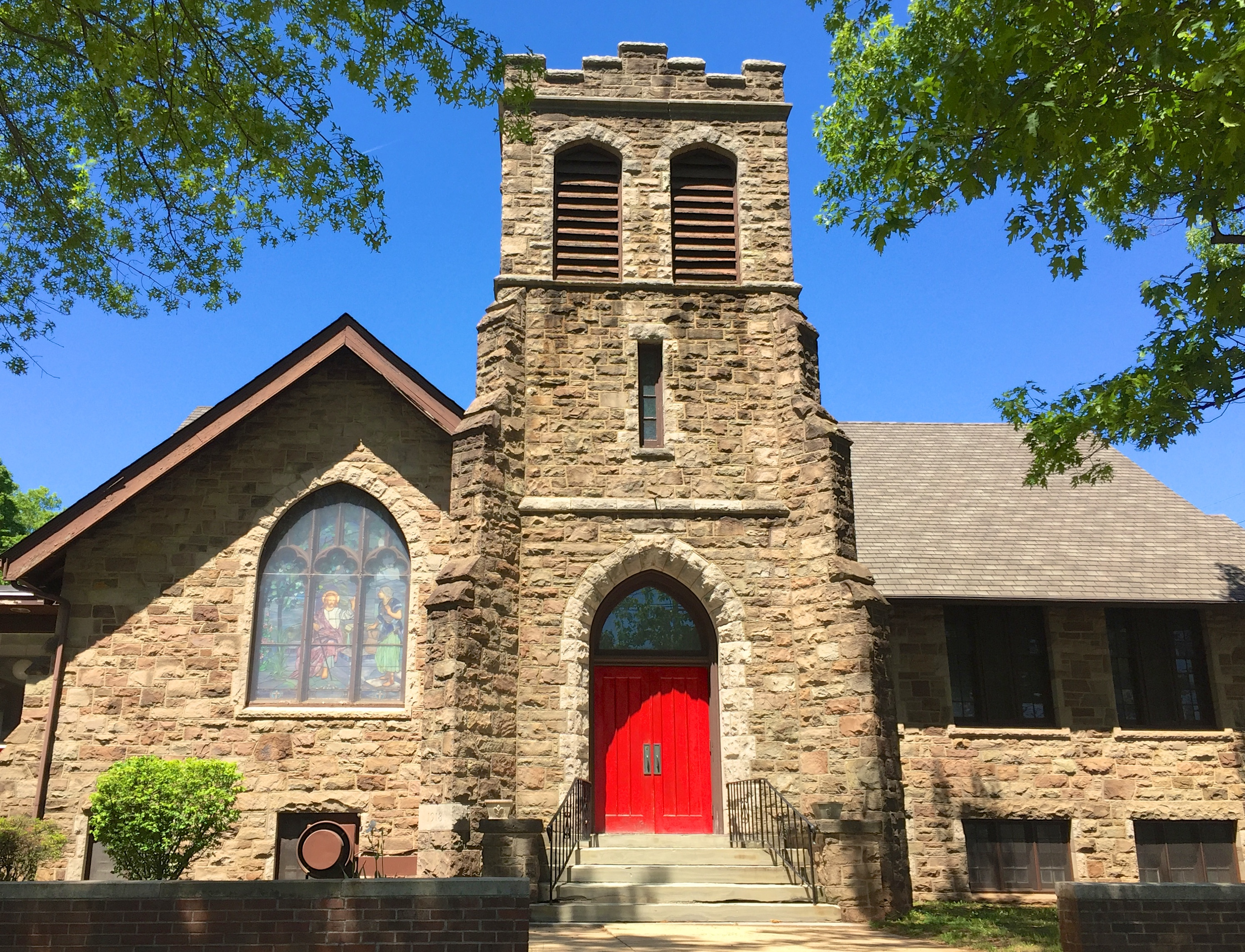
- Middlebush Reformed Church, part of the Middlebush Village Historic District

- Location in Somerset County Location in New Jersey Location in the United States
- Coordinates: 40.505696°N 74.53337°W
- Country: United States
- State: New Jersey
- County: Somerset
- Township: Franklin

Area
  - Total: 1.99 sq mi (5.16 km^{2})
  - Land: 1.99 sq mi (5.15 km^{2})
  - Water: 0 sq mi (0.00 km^{2}) 0.07%
- Elevation: 138 ft (42 m)

Population (2020)
  - Total: 2,368
  - Density: 1,190.1/sq mi (459.51/km^{2})
- Time zone: UTC−05:00 (Eastern (EST))
  - Summer (DST): UTC−04:00 (Eastern (EDT))
- ZIP Code: 08873 - Somerset
- Area codes: 609/640 and 732/848
- FIPS code: 34-45870
- GNIS feature ID: 02584011

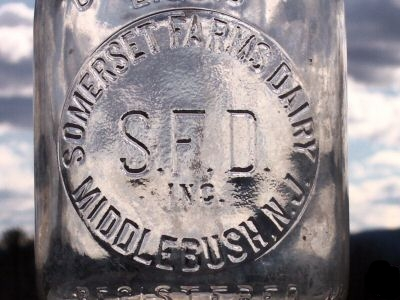
Milk bottle from Somerset Farms in Middlebush

Middlebush is an unincorporated community and census-designated place (CDP) located in Franklin Township, in Somerset County, in the U.S. state of New Jersey. As of the 2020 census, Middlebush had a population of 2,368. It is perhaps most distinguished as being the host section for Franklin Township's municipal complex.

Middlebush still has a rural feel with 19th-century homes and tree-lined streets. Middlebush was once a stop on the Millstone and New Brunswick Railroad, and this legacy is evident in the street named Railroad Avenue that presently has no railroad tracks in sight.

== Geography ==
According to the United States Census Bureau, Middlebush had a total area of 1.990 square miles (5.155 km^{2}), including 1.989 square miles (5.151 km^{2}) of land and 0.001 square miles (0.004 km^{2}) of water (0.07%).

== Demographics ==
Historical population
Census	Pop.	Note	%±
2010	2,326		—
2020	2,368		1.8%
Population sources: 2010 2020

Middlebush first appeared as a census designated place in the 2010 U.S. census.

=== Racial and ethnic composition ===
Middlebush CDP, New Jersey – Racial and ethnic composition Note: the US Census treats Hispanic/Latino as an ethnic category. This table excludes Latinos from the racial categories and assigns them to a separate category. Hispanics/Latinos may be of any race.
Race / Ethnicity (NH = Non-Hispanic)	Pop 2010	Pop 2020	% 2010	% 2020
White alone (NH)	1,357	1,153	58.34%	48.69%
Black or African American alone (NH)	286	279	12.30%	11.78%
Native American or Alaska Native alone (NH)	4	4	0.17%	0.17%
Asian alone (NH)	462	577	19.86%	24.37%
Native Hawaiian or Pacific Islander alone (NH)	0	0	0.00%	0.00%
Other race alone (NH)	10	17	0.43%	0.72%
Mixed race or Multiracial (NH)	46	112	1.98%	4.73%
Hispanic or Latino (any race)	161	226	6.92%	9.54%
Total	2,326	2,368	100.00%	100.00%

=== 2020 census ===
As of the 2020 census, Middlebush had a population of 2,368. The median age was 45.1 years. 19.4% of residents were under the age of 18 and 20.8% of residents were 65 years of age or older. For every 100 females there were 98.8 males, and for every 100 females age 18 and over there were 93.2 males age 18 and over.

100.0% of residents lived in urban areas, while 0.0% lived in rural areas.

There were 851 households in Middlebush, of which 26.2% had children under the age of 18 living in them. Of all households, 61.1% were married-couple households, 8.8% were households with a male householder and no spouse or partner present, and 24.9% were households with a female householder and no spouse or partner present. About 20.9% of all households were made up of individuals and 14.7% had someone living alone who was 65 years of age or older.

There were 884 housing units, of which 3.7% were vacant. The homeowner vacancy rate was 0.0% and the rental vacancy rate was 12.1%.

=== 2010 census ===
The 2010 United States census counted 2,326 people, 834 households, and 592 families in the CDP. The population density was 1,169.6 per square mile (451.6/km^{2}). There were 868 housing units at an average density of 436.4 per square mile (168.5/km^{2}). The racial makeup was 62.81% (1,461) White, 12.64% (294) Black or African American, 0.17% (4) Native American, 20.03% (466) Asian, 0.00% (0) Pacific Islander, 1.72% (40) from other races, and 2.62% (61) from two or more races. Hispanic or Latino of any race were 6.92% (161) of the population.

Of the 834 households, 34.3% had children under the age of 18; 63.2% were married couples living together; 5.5% had a female householder with no husband present and 29.0% were non-families. Of all households, 25.5% were made up of individuals and 17.5% had someone living alone who was 65 years of age or older. The average household size was 2.77 and the average family size was 3.40.

24.6% of the population were under the age of 18, 6.0% from 18 to 24, 23.9% from 25 to 44, 30.4% from 45 to 64, and 15.1% who were 65 years of age or older. The median age was 42.6 years. For every 100 females, the population had 97.3 males. For every 100 females ages 18 and older there were 92.0 males.

== Points of interest ==
- Middlebush Reformed Church
- Middlebush Park is Franklin Township's newest municipal park. Located in Middlebush, off DeMott Lane, the park hosts ballfields and a children's playground.
- Stage House Tavern was Colonial Farms, which now houses the restaurant.
- Middlebush Giant was a circus performer and sideshow attraction who retired to a farm in Middlebush.
- Cedar Grove Cemetery, Franklin is located off Amwell Avenue and contains the body of the Middlebush Giant.
- Middlebush Volunteer Fire Department

== Historic district ==
The Middlebush Village Historic District was added to the National Register of Historic Places on April 24, 2007.
