= Middlebush Reformed Church =

Coordinates: 40.4972°N 74.5284°W

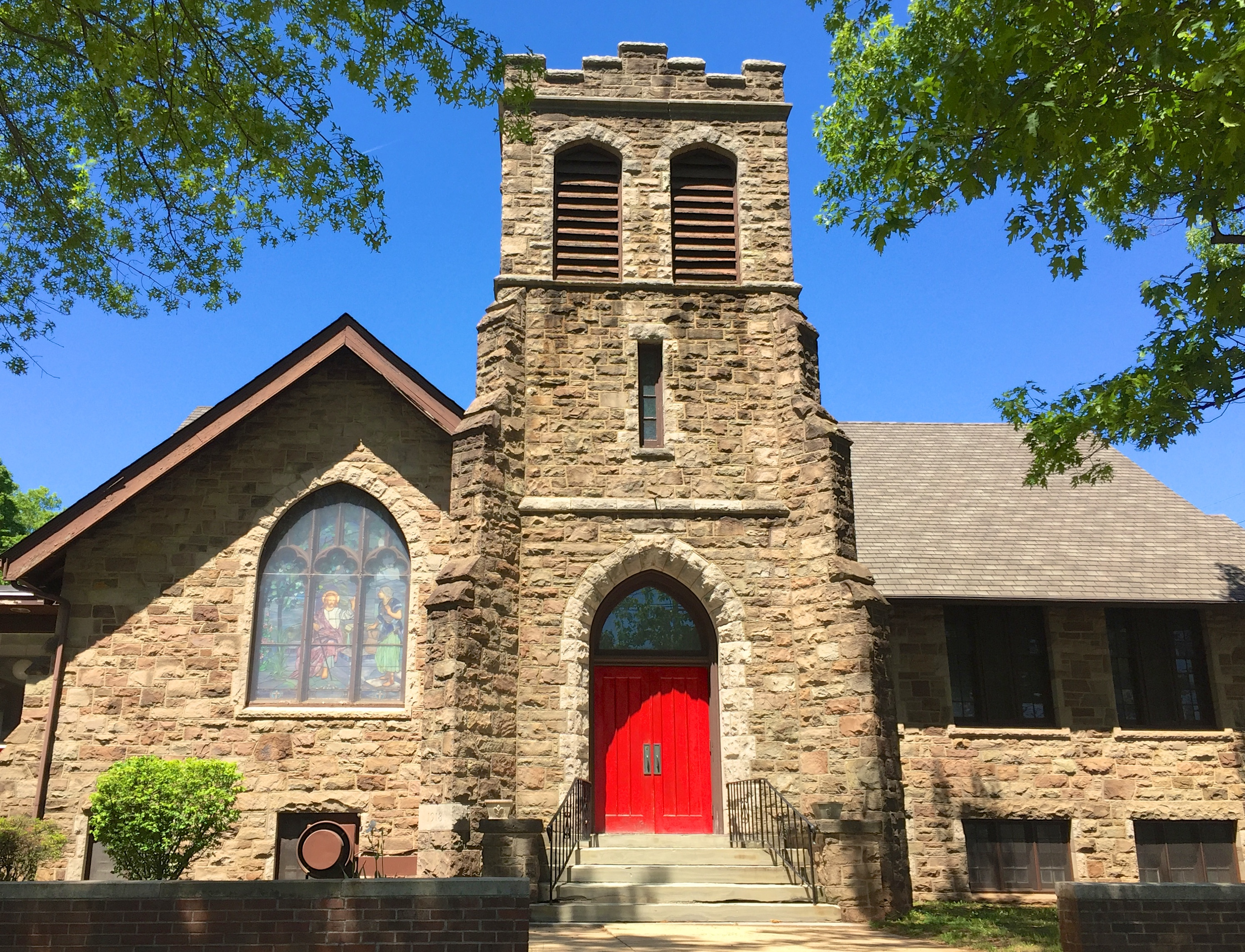

- Location within Somerset County, New Jersey
- Country: United States
- Denomination: Reformed Church in America
- Website: MiddlebushReformedChurch.com

History
- Founded: March 19, 1834
- Middlebush Reformed Church
- U.S. Historic district – Contributing property
- Location within Somerset County, New Jersey Location within New Jersey Location within the United States
- Location: 1 South Middlebush Road, Middlebush, New Jersey
- Built: 1919
- Part of: Middlebush Village Historic District (ID07000354)
- Designated CP: April 24, 2007

Middlebush Reformed Church, known as "the church with the red doors", is located at 1 South Middlebush Road at the corner of Amwell Road in the Middlebush section of Franklin Township in Somerset County, New Jersey, United States. It is the fourth oldest church in Franklin Township. It was organized in 1834, and the New York Times noted their first church was built in Colonial times and was one of the landmarks of the region. The church is a contributing property of the Middlebush Village Historic District that was added to the National Register of Historic Places on April 24, 2007.

The church is a part of the Reformed Church in America.

== History ==
It was organized by Dutch settlers on March 19, 1834 in the Colonial Farms area of what is now Franklin Township, Somerset County, New Jersey. The initial three member committee included the first Reverend of the church Jacob Schultz. The settlers had "migrated from Manhattan Island seeking more tillable land". Residents were previously traveling to Reformed churches in Hillsborough, New Jersey; Franklin Park, New Jersey; or New Brunswick. The few Dutch families initially met in a barn "in what is now O'Connor's Beef 'N Chowder House on Amwell Road" owned by the Voorhees family. One descendant, Mary Amanda Voorhees, "Miss Amanda", later served as the church's organist for forty-five years. "[S]ervices continued there until 1835, when the white frame church was completed". Jacob I. Schultz (1792-1852), the pastor at Whitehouse Station, New Jersey and Lebanon, New Jersey was contacted. The new church building was dedicated on February 19, 1835. The final cost was $3,989. Schultz was formally installed as pastor on December 30, 1835.

Lightning destroyed the church building on July 2, 1917, the New York Times noted part of the furniture was saved and the loss was estimated at $50,000. Congregation members who lived nearby rescued furniture and the church membership book. A kerosene lamp was saved, and is currently hanging in the church. Planning for the new building at the same site started immediately but construction was delayed by World War I. The Gothic Revival building was rebuilt using stone from the Martinsville, New Jersey quarry. The church was rededicated in 1919.

In 1972 the church set up a "mini" school.

In 2003 the church started a living nativity which includes four readings from the Bible and ends with the adoration of the magi. The annual Christmastime event includes "costumed characters, live animals and carollers".

The church celebrated their 175th anniversary in 2009. They buried and sealed a time capsule to be opened at the congregation's 200th anniversary in 2034, 25 years later.

== Pastors ==
Pastors have included the following:

- Jacob I. Schultz (1792-1852), 1834-1837
- John Addison Van Doren, 1838-1865
- George Swain (pastor), 1866-1868
- Stephen L. Mershon, 1869–1874
- James Le Fevre, 1875-1902
- John A. Thomson (pastor), 1902-1920
- Frank A. Langwith, 1921-1926
- Harold W. Nelson, 1926-1928
- Russell W. Shepherd, 1928-1930
- Marinus Den Herder, 1931-1932
- Cornelius Van Leeuwen, 1934-1937
- Frank A. Langwith, 1937–1948
- David W. Jenks, student, 1949-1952
- Vernon L. Dethmers, 1952-1960
- Charles B. Bridgman, 1961-1973
- Ronald L. VanderBeek, 1974-1986
- John J. Arnone, assistant, 1981–1982
- Gerald L. Vermilye, interim, 1986
- Taylor Holbrook, 1986-1998
- Ross Rettig, 1999-2001
- George Montanari, 2002-current
