= Colonial Farms =

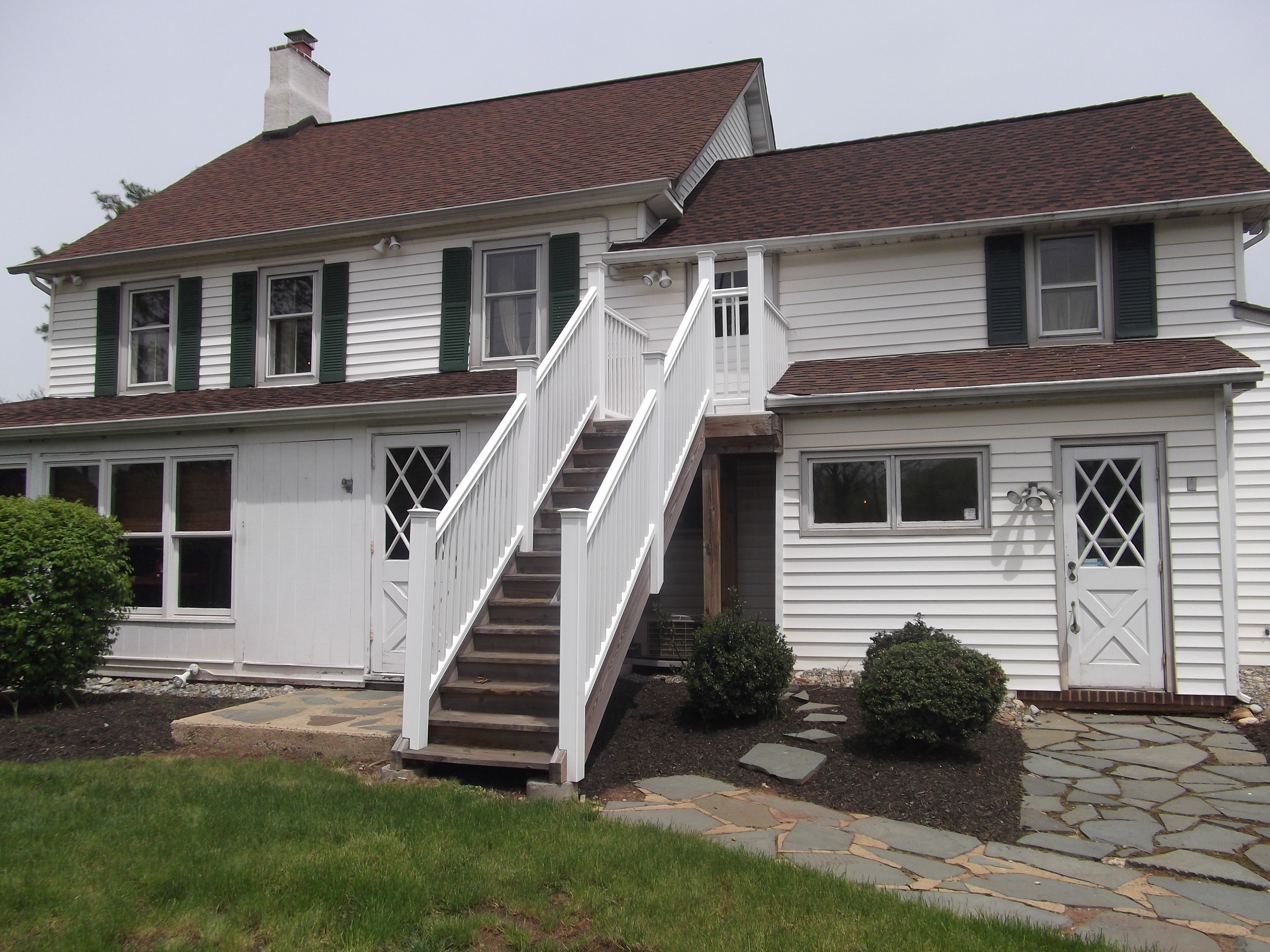
- The Stage House Tavern
- Alternative names: Voorhees House; Stage House Tavern

General information
- Architectural style: Georgian
- Address: 1719 Amwell Road
- Town or city: Middlebush, New Jersey
- Country: United States
- Coordinates: 40.496565°N 74.526787°W
- Year(s) built: 1793

Website
- stagehousetavern.com/somerset

Colonial Farms, also known as the Voorhees House, is located at 1719 Amwell Road in the Middlebush section of Franklin Township, Somerset County, New Jersey, United States. It was built in 1793 by P. Metz in a Georgian style. It is part of the Middlebush Village Historic District. The oldest building in the district, it was used in 1834 to organize the Middlebush Reformed Church. The location also includes a contributing large, red shingle, 19th-century Dutch barn. It is now the Stage House Tavern.

== History ==
Denyse Teunissen from the Netherlands moved from Long Island when he purchased the property in 1703. In 1723, Christian VanDoren purchased 357 acres (1.44 km^{2}) from Teunissens. Later the property was divided into seven smaller farms, one was bought by Garrett Voorhees I for his home. His son, Garrett Voorhees II, inherited the property after his father's death. On June 19, 1777, their home was burned by General Cornwallis during his retreat from the Somerset County Courthouse. Using the money he received from the British as compensation for his loss, he re-built what is now Colonial Farms, which housed O'Connor's Beef 'N Chowder House. In 2011 the building became the Stage House Tavern when it was sold to a new owner.
