= John T. Kewish =

J. T. Kewish, US patent 1472126.

John T. Kewish (1867-1945) was an American inventor and firearms designer.

Kewish was the principal creator of a primer-actuated blowback machine gun in 1918, which is covered by U.S. patent no. 1,472,126. John C. Garand was assigned 25% as a co-inventor. Kewish was a contributor to several later automatic firearm developments, though he never developed a truly successful production small arm.

Kewish was devoutly religious, and in the 1920s held a series of prayer meetings in the streets of New York City that brought him into conflict with police authorities.

In 1940, he unsuccessfully attempted to assert legal claims to the patent for the gas-operated US M1 rifle.

Kewish died on March 1, 1945, aged 78 in Smithtown, Long Island, New York.

== Patents ==
Patents include:

US1472126 - Filed Jul 09, 1918 - Issued Oct 30, 1923 "Machine Gun"
US1502676 - Filed Sep 14, 1920 - Issued Jul 29, 1924 "Automatic Rifle"
US1587003 - Filed Sep 07, 1921 - Issued Jun 01, 1926 "Automatic Firearm"
US1563751 - Filed May 31, 1924 - Issued Dec 01, 1925 "Automatic Firearm"
US1696537 - Filed Apr 13, 1927 - Issued Dec 25, 1928 "Automatic Firearm"
US1993887 - Filed Apr 16, 1932 - Issued Mar 12, 1935 "Automatic Firearm"

== See also ==
- Blowback (firearms)
