= Samuel Corlett =

English cricketer (1852–1921)

Samuel Corlett (8 May 1852 – 2 January 1921) was an English cricketer. He was a right-handed batsman and a right-arm medium-fast bowler who played for Lancashire. He was born in Withington and died in Rusholme, Manchester.

Corlett's first-class debut, against Kent in 1871, saw him score 4 and 2 from his two innings. Corlett's second and final first-class appearance came four years later, against Derbyshire, though in an innings victory, he failed to score a run.

Corlett's club career saw him play for the Colts, followed by Rusholme.
