= Middlebush Village Historic District =

Historic district in New Jersey, United States

- U.S. National Register of Historic Places
- U.S. Historic district
- New Jersey Register of Historic Places
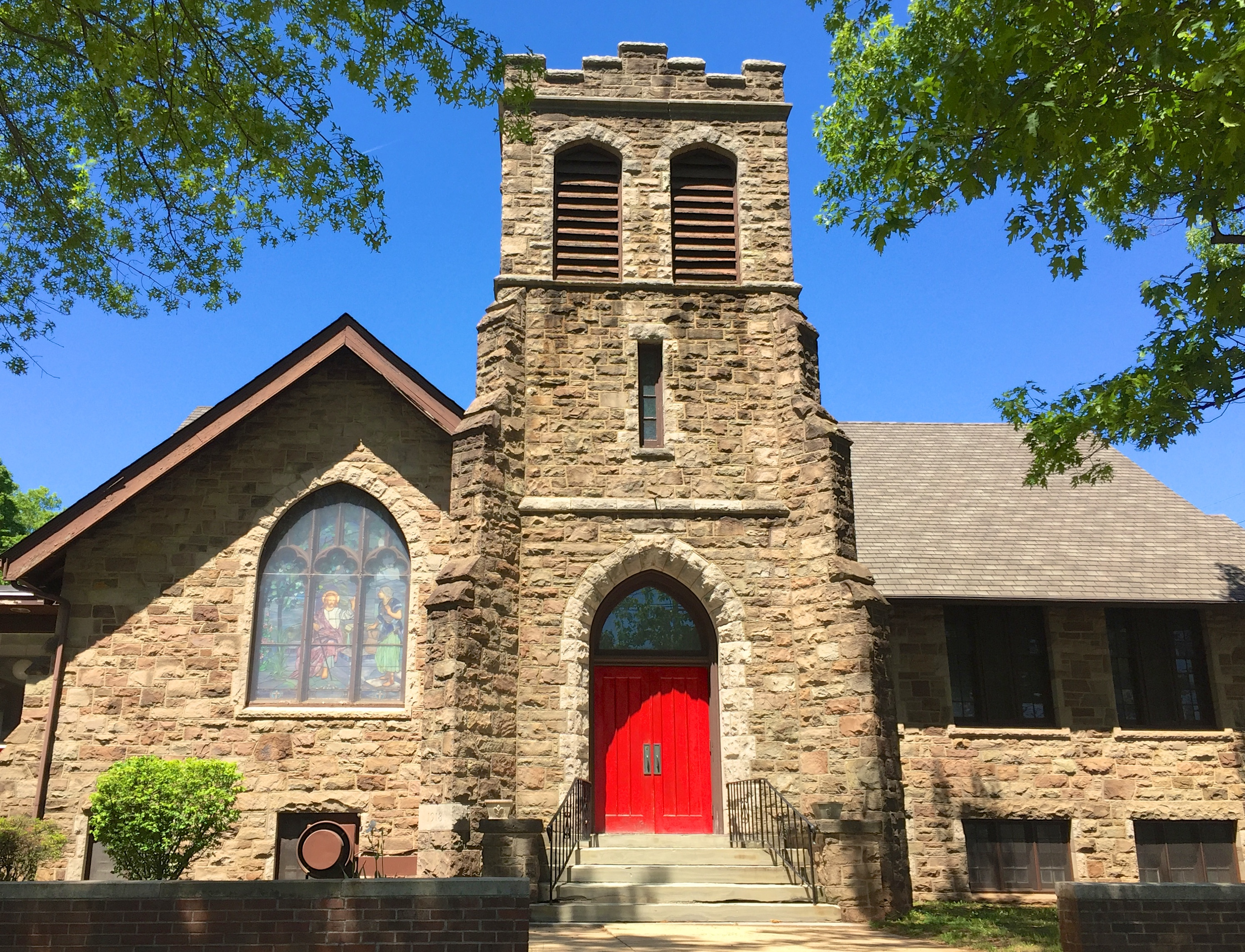
- Middlebush Reformed Church

- Location within Somerset County, New Jersey Location within New Jersey Location within the United States
- Location: Amwell Road, South Middlebush Road, Railroad Avenue, Olcott Street, and Debow Street, Franklin Township, Somerset County, New Jersey
- Coordinates: 40°29′44″N 74°31′44″W
- Built: 1834
- Architectural style: Colonial Revival, Greek Revival
- NRHP reference No.: 07000354
- NJRHP No.: 4704

Significant dates
- Added to NRHP: April 24, 2007
- Designated NJRHP: February 7, 2007

The Middlebush Village Historic District is a historic district located in the Village of Middlebush, an unincorporated community within Franklin Township, Somerset County, New Jersey. The district was added to the National Register of Historic Places on April 24, 2007. It includes 37 contributing buildings and three contributing sites.

== Architectural styles ==
The architectural styles of the district include Colonial Revival, Craftsman, Federal, Georgian, Gothic Revival, Greek Revival, and Italianate.

== History ==
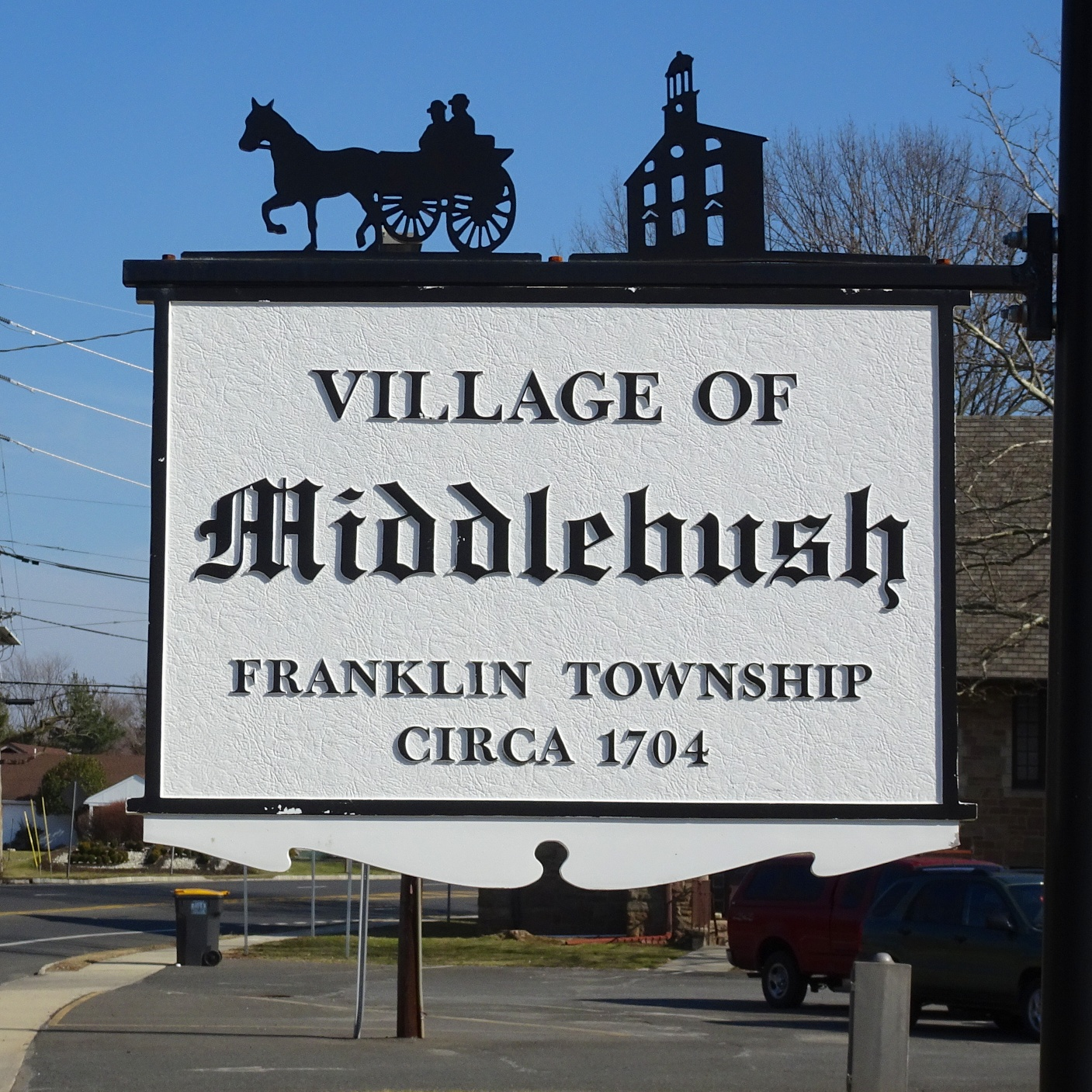
Village of Middlebush

In 1701, a group of eight people bought a tract of 10,000 acres from John Harrison in what is now Franklin Township. They divided this Harrison Tract into eight plots and then into sixteen by drawing a north-south dividing line. This line eventually became a road, the Middle Line, now called South Middlebush Road. The other main road in the district is the east-west Amwell Road, which historically connected New Brunswick to Millstone, which was then the county seat of Somerset County. By 1704, two of the sons, John and Peter, of Cornelius Wyckoff, one of the original eight buyers, had settled in the Middlebush area.

== Contributing properties ==
The Middlebush Reformed Church, located at the intersection of South Middlebush Road and Amwell Road, was built in 1919 to replace the original 1834 church. It is a mix of Gothic Revival and Craftsman styles.

The Voorhees House, located at 1719 Amwell Road, was built in 1793 by P. Metz in a Georgian style. It is now the Stage House Tavern. The oldest building in the district, it was used in 1834 to organized the Middlebush Reformed Church. The location also includes a contributing large, red shingle, 19th-century Dutch barn.

The Middlebush School, located at 1755 Amwell Road, was built in 1926 as an elementary school. It is now known as the Franklin Township Board of Education Building.

The house at 17 South Middlebush Road was built c. 1842–43 by John Wyckoff in a style between Greek Revival and Italianate.

The house at 53 South Middlebush Road was built c. 1850 and was owned by Peter Brokaw.

The railroad station site on Railroad Avenue for the former Millstone and New Brunswick Railroad. The station was built in 1860 and torn down in 1948.

== Gallery ==
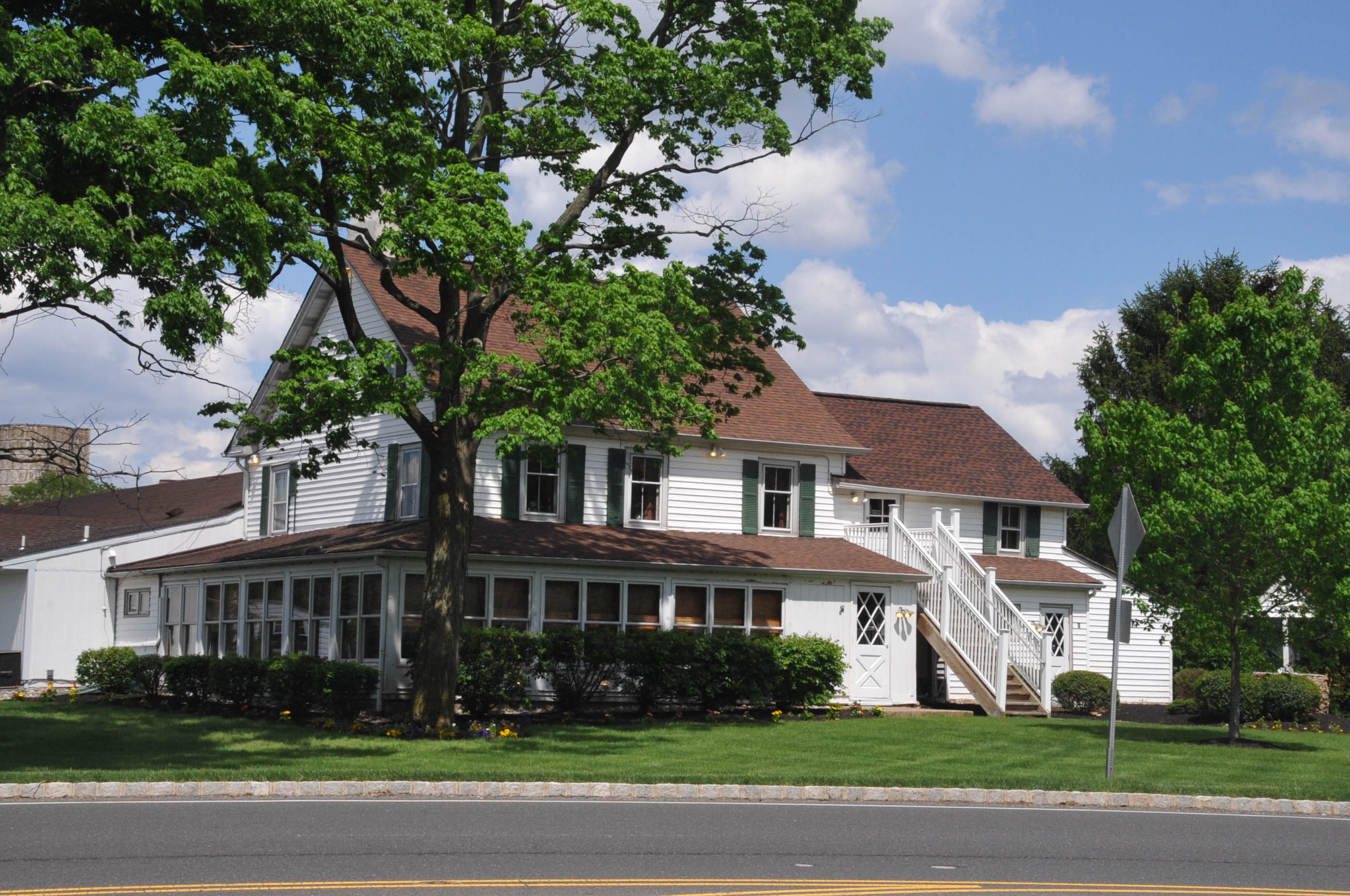
Voorhees House

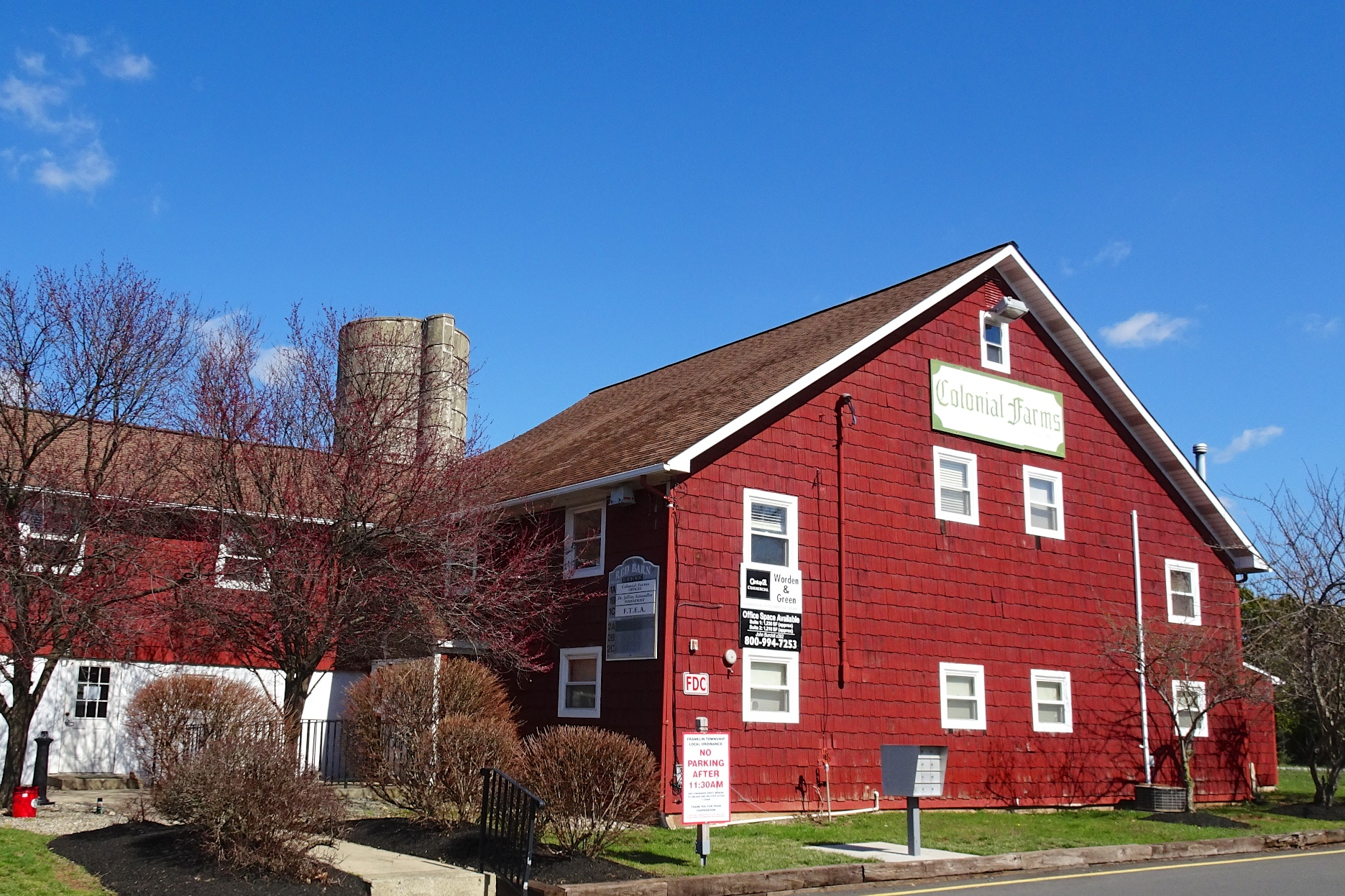
Dutch barn at the Voorhees House
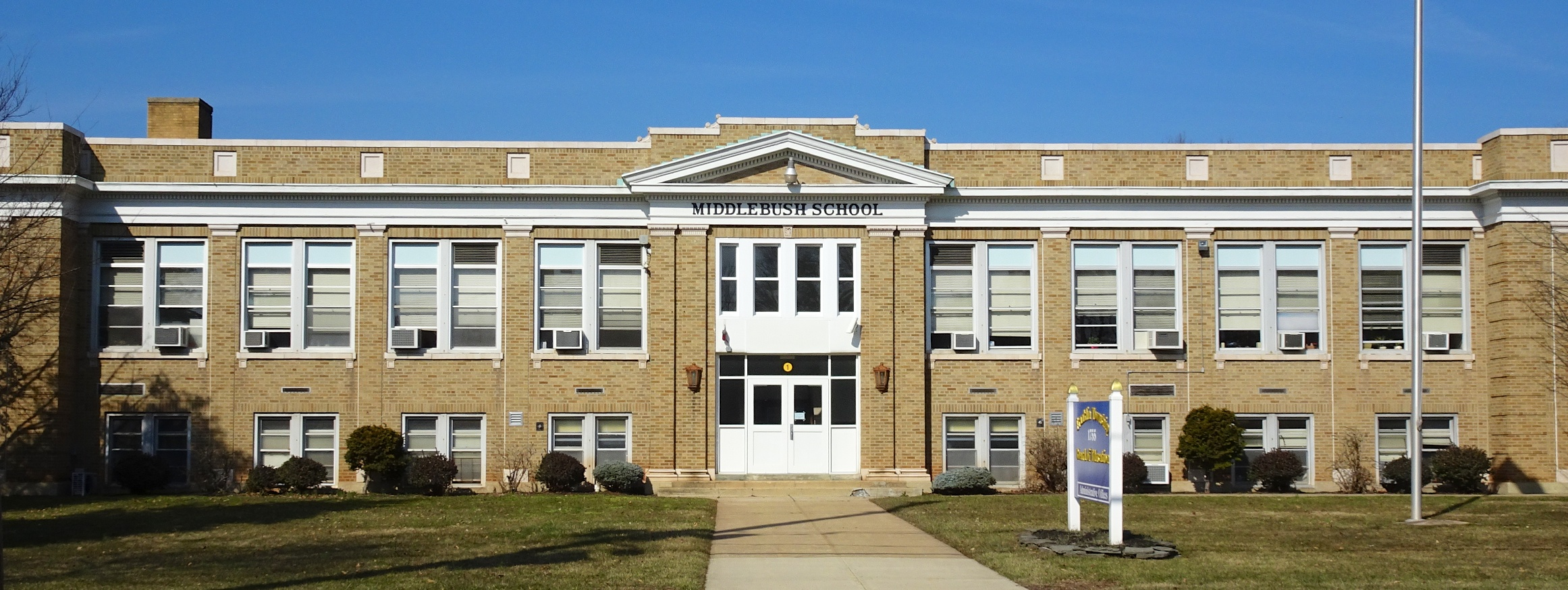
Middlebush School
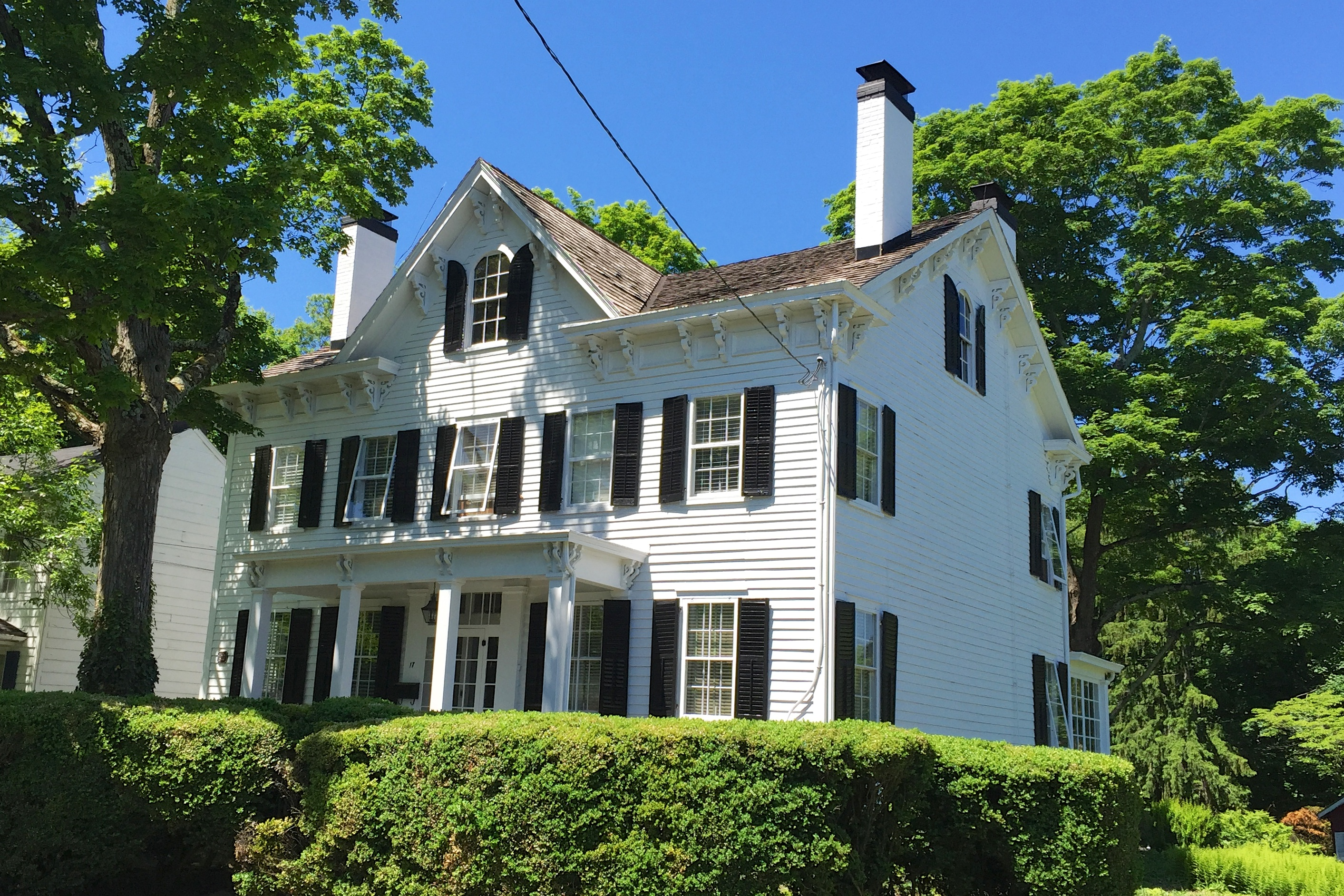
17 South Middlebush Road

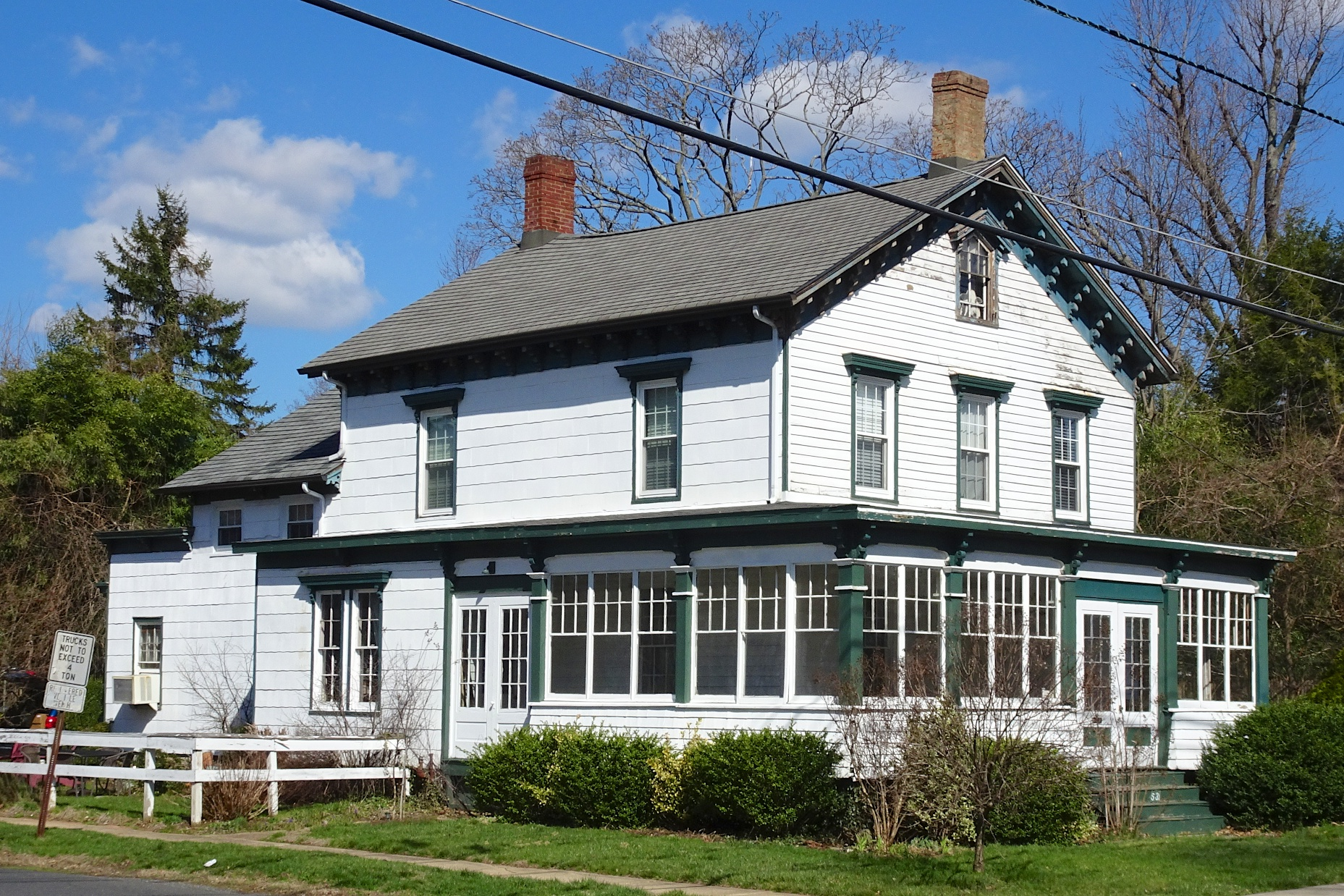
53 South Middlebush Road

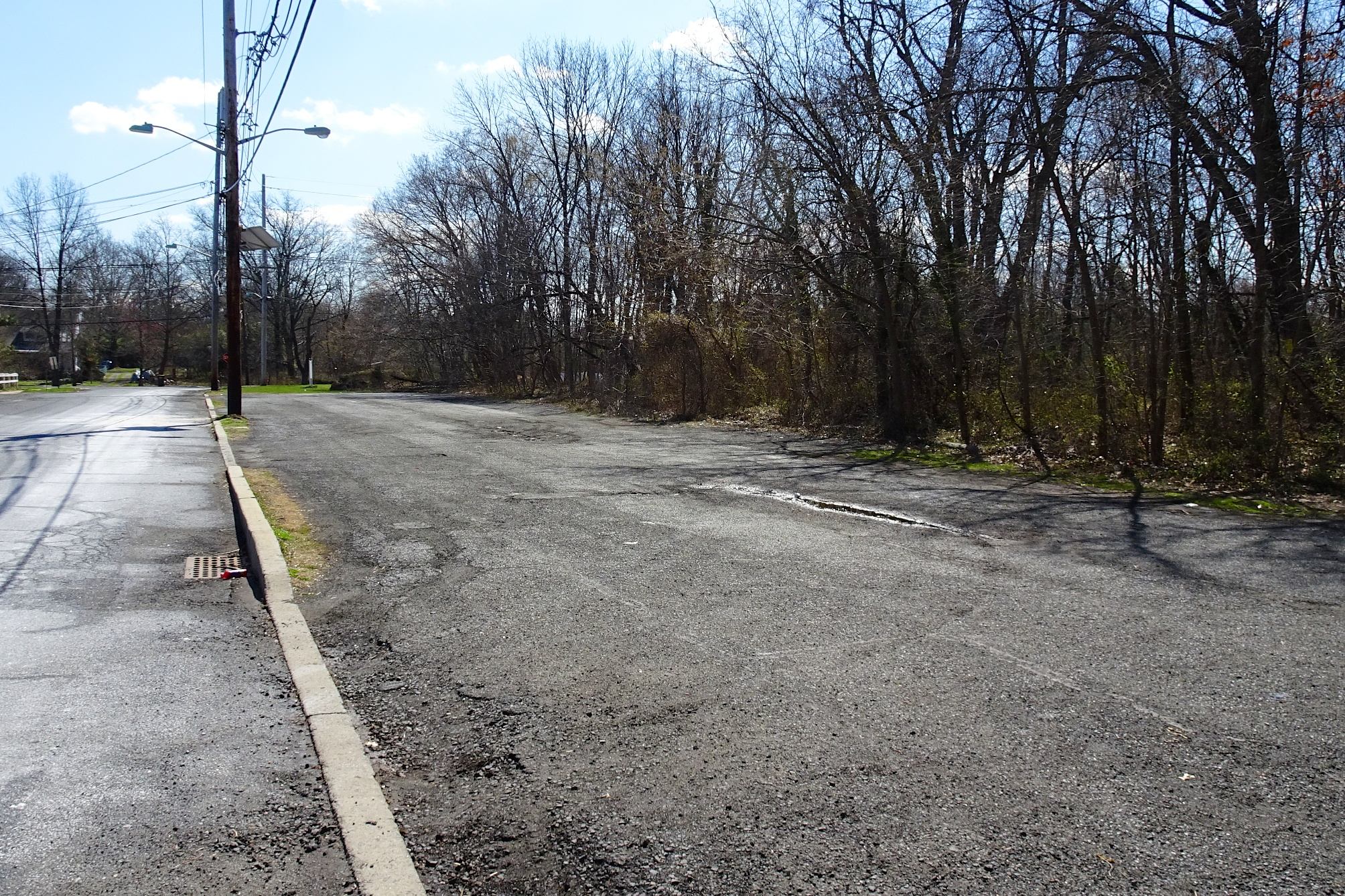
Railroad Avenue site of former M&NB station

== See also ==
- Wyckoff-Garretson House

== Bibliography ==
- Snell, James P. (1881). History of Hunterdon and Somerset Counties, New Jersey. Everts & Peck. p. 1.
