= Carrol McCubbin =

American politician (1915–2013)

Member of the U.S. House of Representatives from Missouri's 118th district
- Incumbent
- Assumed office 1965

Missouri House of Representatives

Personal details
- Born: 1915 Brumley, Missouri
- Died: 2013 (aged 97–98)
- Party: Republican
- Spouse(s): Sarah Watkins, Betty Gayle
- Children: 5
- Occupation: Educator

Carrol McCubbin (September 1, 1915 – April 4, 2013) was an American Republican politician who served in the Missouri House of Representatives. He was born near Brumley, Missouri, and was educated at schools in Miller County, Brumley High School, Central Missouri State University, and the University of Missouri-Columbia. During World War II, he was commissioned as an ensign in the United States Navy and served as a staff officer for Admiral Thomas Kincaid. He participated in the invasion of the Philippines and served 20 years in the Naval Reserve.
