= Thomas Shimmin =

British poet

Thomas Shimmin (1800 – c. 1876–1879) was a rag gatherer and poet nicknamed "Tom the Dipper" who lived in the Isle of Man.

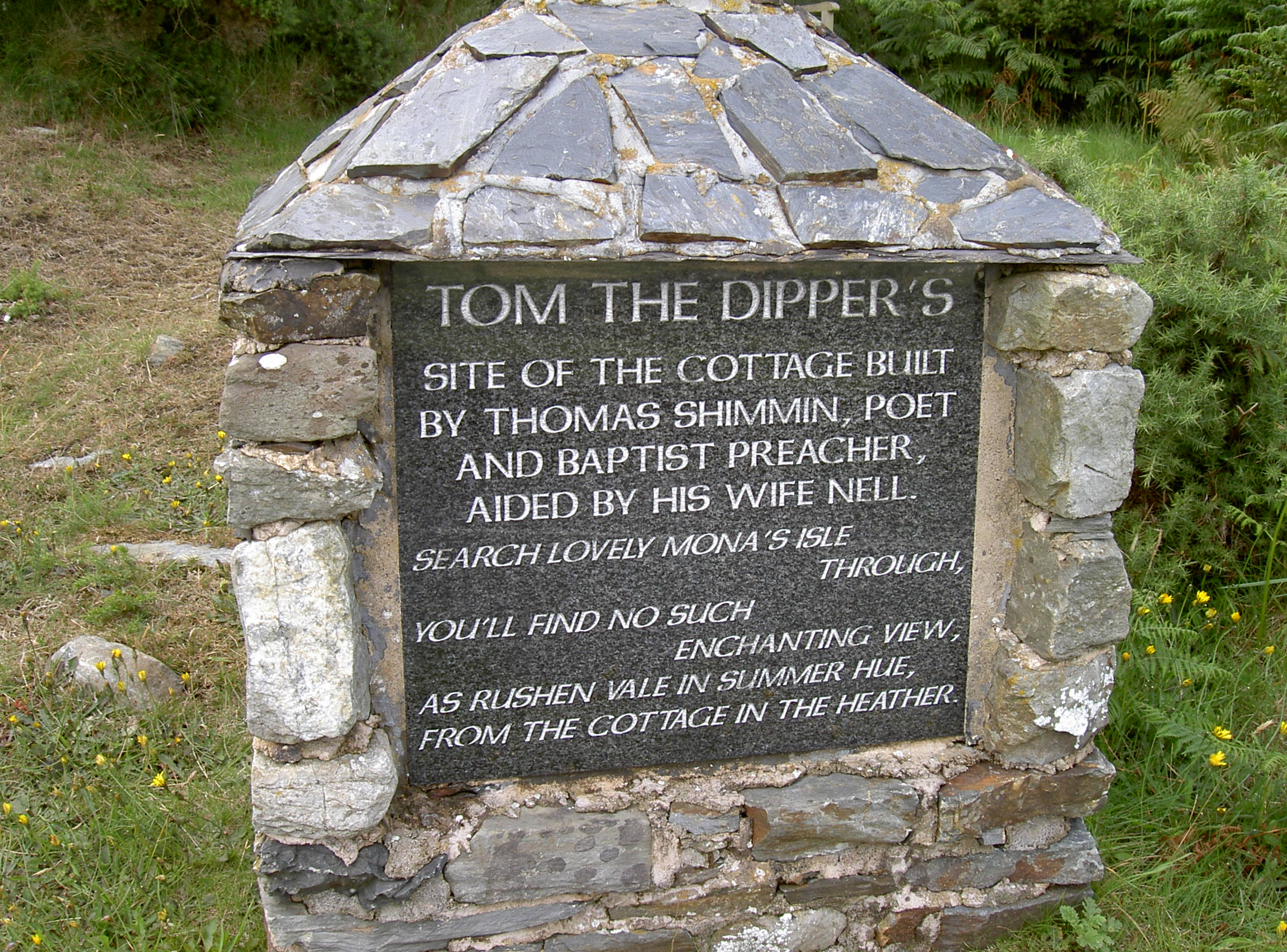
Commemorative plaque for Tom the Dipper

He sang and wrote poetry in the Manx language and in English. His poems include, Yn Coayl jeh'n Lillee (The Loss of the Lily), Happy Marriage of the Prince of Wales, and The Royal Manx Railway, or £5 of wit for a penny.

He was twice sentenced for robbery, first in 1843 and second in 1851. In 1843, he was sentenced to transportation to Australia, but was pardoned and released in July 1847. He also preached. He may have died in 1876 or 1879.

== Happy Marriage of the Prince of Wales ==
But the despised metropolis,
I call it Castletown,
Although the Governor were amiss,
In honour did abound;
'Twas not alone the poor were fed,
But tradesmen and there spouse,
To the Town Hall were freely led,
And quickly filled the house.
