= Cyril Clague =

Manx author

Cyril Clague (c.1880 – 28 July 1946) was the author of the popular Manx dialect poem, The Peel Manx Tay Party.

== Life ==
Clague was born in c.1880, the son of Henry Clague, a Douglas draper. After leaving the Douglas Higher Grade School (later the Douglas High School), Clague entered the main Douglas Post Office as a probationer, where he served until transferring to Liverpool at the opening of the new General Post Office there. After about 11 years in Liverpool, he returned to the Isle of Man in 1910, when he entered the controlling staff on the Main Post Office in Douglas. He remained in this position until retiring in October 1939, having reached the retiring age limit.

Whilst in Liverpool, Clague became a qualified signaller attached to the Liverpool Scottish Territorial Battalion. Upon returning to Douglas, he became honorary instructor of signalling to the Isle of Man Volunteer Battalion. At the outbreak of the First World War, Clague was called up and attached to the Royal Engineers, but was soon brought back to the Isle of Man after protestations by the Island's Head Postmaster. Throughout the rest of the war Clague was in charge of the post office at Knockaloe Internment Camp.

At the outbreak of the Second World War Clague became employed by the Military Service Division of Government Office but later joined the Food Control Division. He came to be Food Controller before falling ill in around June 1946. He died about a month later, at his home, 30 Alexandra Drive, Douglas, on Sunday 28 July 1946.

== Manx dialect ==
From at least 1922 Clague was performing in Manx dialect theatre, being commended for his part in a play by W. B. Meyrick for his having 'provided many humorous incidents.' As well his performances, Clague also wrote a number of poems in Manx dialect. One of these, The Peel Manx Tea Party, became popular as a performance piece during his lifetime, including among Manx emigrants to North America. The poem continues to be performed today, despite never having been published in either the Manx newspapers or in book form. because it today has no single written source, the poem is known by a number of titles, including 'The Peel Tay Fight' and 'The Tay Fight at Peel.' The poem can also be heard in a number of small variants, but one version of its opening stanza is as follows:

Have thou aver been to a tay fight in the counthry of oul Mona’s Isle?
Thou haven’t! – well then jus’ listen a minute, sit down and res’ a while,
And I’ll do me bes’ to tell yer, of a do that was given in Peel,
Aw, them Peel gals are the boys, they’re sayin’, to provide a tremenjous good meal.
