= Paul Lewthwaite =

Paul Lewthwaite (born 1969 in Douglas, Isle of Man) is a sculptor working internationally, based in the UK. He produces sculptures for exhibition and public commission. His work is exhibited widely across the UK, Europe and the US. Lewthwaite is a Fellow of the Royal British Society of Sculptors.

== Recent Commissions and Exhibitions ==
- On Show at 108. One year display. Royal British Society of Sculptors, London, UK.
- USF Verftet. “B-Open”, Bergen, Norway.
- 'A Collection of Fragments', Geldards LLP, The Arc, Nottingham, UK.
- 'Transforming and Enabling', Wrightington Hospital, Wigan, UK. The John Charnley Trust.
- 'Montserrat Drawings' Espai Serrat, Barcelona, Spain, - solo exhibition.
- Portico Gallery. “Amongst Forgotten Treasures”, Manchester, UK.
- 'RBS Centenary Exhibition', Harold Martin Botanic Gardens, Leicester, UK - group exhibition.
- 'A System of Support and Balance', Chesterfield Magistrates' Court, Derbyshire, UK.
- 'Mere Jelly at on the Wall', Olympia Grand Hall, London, UK - group exhibition.

== Academic ==
Lewthwaite was an expert panelist at the "Nordic Material Playground" conference, at the Norwegian Centre for Design and Architecture, Oslo, Norway. He is a visiting artist at the Bergen National Academy of Art in Norway, and the Thomas Danby College in the UK.

== Select bibliography ==
2007: "International Residency". Article. (a-n) Magazine, p. 21. February.
2002: Galeria Nela Alberca Publicity, Lapiz Revista Internacional de Arte, no 179/180, p. 193.
2002: 'Lines of Connection', review, InmAdrid, p. 4 'Las Lineas Y Formas de Paul Frank', review, Metro 20 minutos Feb 21, p. 24
2001: Front cover (a-n) Magazine, February, Review p. 7, Article p. 34.

Robert Clark. Art critic for The Guardian. Mere Jelly catalogue. 2004.

Paul Frank Lewthwaite makes sculptures that make a fragmented poetic rather than coherent practical sense. Timber boxes open to reveal spray-painted MDF flat packs for the construction of not domestic shelves or furniture but what the artist calls “motifs of fragmentation”. Ship for the Sinking is a steel kit for a sea-going suicide. A Place of Blindness is a steel model house spray painted black with plywood boarded-up windows. Three Diaries: Hopes, Dreams, Desires is a set of three steel diary-sized locked safes. The mystifying strength of Lewthwaite’s work lies in its half-resemblance to quite ordinary things. Often made from DIY materials, these constructions look like they should be of some use, yet like a DIY joke, their use escapes us. A recent series of even more mysterious plywood sculptures were based on a combination of drawings done at Madrid’s Museo Arqueologico Nacional and reproductions taken from The War Illustrated publications 1940-1946. These are plywood semi-abstracts but again take on the significance of skeletal relics or fossilised remains. Then again they could be bits of furniture gone weird, furnishings from a DIY nightmare. Lewthwaite’s mock-domestic sculptures bring home the fact that an artwork is an immaculately crafted object that is of absolutely no use to anyone other than being its own deeply suggestive self.
