= Port Grenaugh =

Bay in the Isle of Man

Coordinates: 54°06′01″N 4°34′29″W

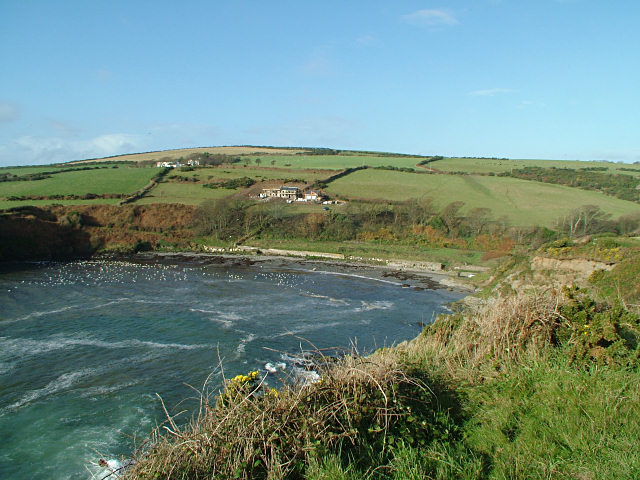
Port Grenaugh seen from the nearby Promontory Fort

Port Grenaugh is a cove in the south-east of the Isle of Man at the foot of Glen Grenaugh, in the parish of Santon, and the mouth of Grace's stream which originates in the Newtown area of the parish by Ballakissack farm.

Close by is Cronk ny Merriu - the remains of one of the island's promontory forts which date back almost 2000 years.
