= Crogga River =

River in the Isle of Man

Coordinates: 54.1317°N 4.5533°W

The Crogga River is a river in the Isle of Man.

Crogga River issues close to the Mount Murray Hotel and Country Club and meanders slowly downhill into the lake in front of the hotel (across which the 18th and later the 9th hole used to be played) and then drops to Murray's Lake before becoming the impassable Crogga River Glen on its way down towards Crogga Glen and Port Soderick and its Manx National Glens.

The Crogga River forms, for the greater part of its course, the boundary between not only Braddan and Santon but also the boundary between the Central Valley and the South Island.

The Crogga Mill, apparently on the east side of the river in Braddan parish, is one of the Isle of Man's officially Registered Buildings.
