= Fairy Bridge (Isle of Man) =

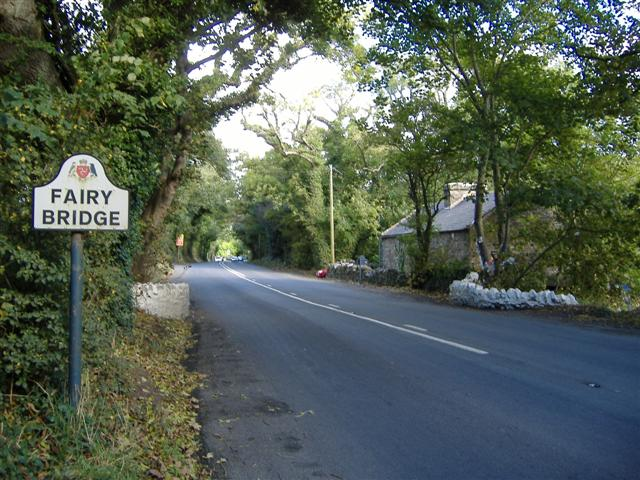
- Fairy Bridge on the A5 road.

- Location within Isle of Man
- 54°06′52″N 4°35′43″W
- Location: A5 road, Isle of Man

Fairy Bridge, Isle of Man (Manx: Ballalona - Glen Farm) is a small bridge over the Santon Burn in the Isle of Man, located on the primary A5 Port Erin to Douglas road, at grid reference 305720, on the parish boundary between Santon and Malew (and also the boundary between the sheadings of Middle and Rushen). A superstition associated with the Fairy Bridge is that passers-by must greet the fairies as they cross it; it is considered bad luck not to greet them.

== Superstitions ==
A superstition is to greet the fairies (an English term for the Mooinjer Veggey ("Little People"); historically never called fairies or ferrish by the Manx and not of similar disposition to the English fairies) when crossing the Fairy Bridge; it is considered unlucky not to greet them.

From the 1950s, it was reportedly the custom to advise a visitor of the myth on the journey south from Douglas or north from the airport. This was timed so that one was required to say "Good morning Fairies!" just as the teller and his guest(s) crossed the Fairy Bridge. This would subsequently be repeated by the same or other tellers, leaving visitors perplexed as to the tellers' beliefs.

Buses passing the Fairy Bridge make an automatic announcement before passing the bridge saying: "Please observe the Manx tradition by saying "Hello Fairies" as we cross the Fairy Bridge".

Like many local superstitions on the Isle of Man, the Fairy Bridge myth is changing with the influx of new residents. It has always been a whimsical practice, never taken too seriously by residents, despite food writer A.A. Gill's repetition in London newspaper "The Times" of an urban myth that taxi drivers will stop if the passenger does not greet the fairies.

Motorcycle racers and spectators at the annual TT and Manx Grand Prix races tend to take the ritual seriously, in most cases making a point of visiting the bridge before setting up for practice and the races. In an example of confirmation bias, mishaps and crashes are readily attributed to the fairies' displeasure; likewise lucky escapes.

It has been suggested that the location was on the boundaries of the land of the nearby Rushen Abbey, and the greeting is a folk memory of crossing oneself at the sight of the crucifix marking the boundary of the monastery's land. This superstition may possibly have arisen at this location during the 19th century in response to the large number of tourists visiting the Island.

== Alternative Fairy Bridge ==
'Real Fairy Bridge' near Kewaigue

The now commonly known '"Real" Fairy Bridge', shown as the "Fairy Bridge" on old Ordnance Survey maps, is located in the parish of Braddan across the Middle River near the footpath from Oakhill to Kewaigue.54°08′15″N 4°31′19″W
