= Lists of hillforts =

Hillforts are fortified settlements that were built across Europe in the Bronze Age, Iron Age, and, to a lesser extent, the Early Middle Ages. The following pages are lists of hillforts:

- Great Britain
  - List of hillforts in Wales
    - List of hillforts in Monmouthshire
  - List of hillforts on the Isle of Man
  - List of hillforts in Northern Ireland
  - List of hillforts in Scotland
  - List of hillforts in England
    - List of hillforts in the Peak District
    - List of hillforts and ancient settlements in Somerset
- Other
  - List of Estonian fortresses contains a common list of castles, fortresses, forts, an hillforts.
  - List of hillforts in Ireland
  - List of hillforts in Latvia
  - List of hillforts in Lithuania
