= Bayr ny Skeddan =

Long distance footpath on the Isle of Man

Bayr ny Skeddan (Manx Gaelic for "Herring Road") is a walking route in the Isle of Man between the towns of Castletown (Balley Chashtal) and Peel (Purt ny h-Inshey). It is about 14 miles (23 km) long, and reaches a maximum height of about 310 metres (1,020 ft) at the Round Table below the South Barrule.

From Castletown, about the first 3 miles (5 km) of the route coincides with that of the Millennium Way, in a northerly direction through Ballasalla and Silverdale Glen. At GR274725 the route turns northwest in the direction of the South Barrule, reaching the Round Table after about another 3 miles (5 km). The path continues north downhill through Glen Rushen to the hamlet of Glenmaye and along the cliff top to Peel.

== See also ==
- The Millennium Way, a 28-mile (45 km) walk between Castletown and Ramsey
- Raad ny Foillan (English: The Way of the Gull), a 95-mile (153 km) circular walk which starts and finishes at the Millennium Bridge over Douglas Harbour
