= Silver Burn =

River on the Isle of Man

Coordinates: 54°04′23″N 4°39′00″W

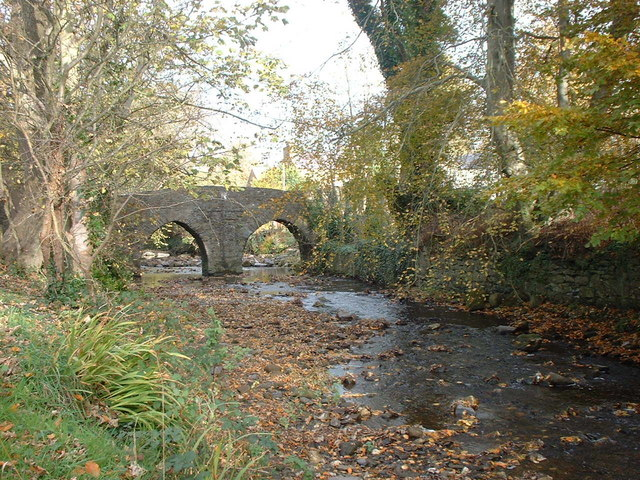
Monks' Bridge across Silver Burn at Rushen Abbey

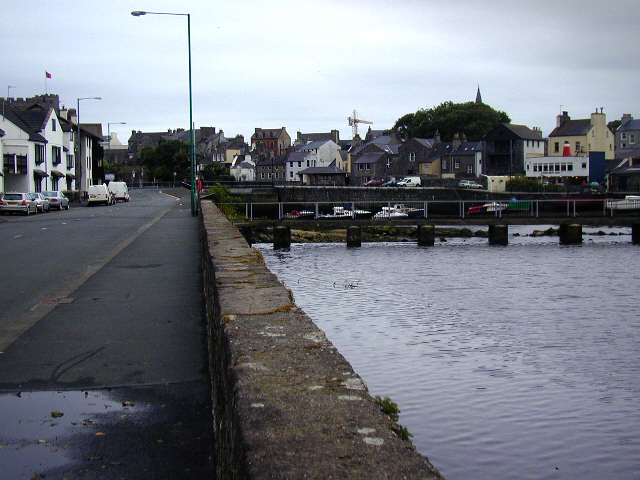
Silver Burn near Castletown harbour

The Silver Burn or Silverburn River (Manx: Awin Rosien) is a small river, about five miles (8 km) long, on the Isle of Man which rises near the South Barrule and flows south. It passes St Mark's and in its lower reaches it flows under the Monks' Bridge at Ballasalla, and reaches the sea at Castletown harbour. Just above Ballasalla, the burn runs through wooded Silverdale Glen, a site which the Manx National Trust acquired in 1966.

The section from the A3 south to the A7 in Ballasalla makes up the Silverdale Conservation Area, a conservation area, and includes Silverdale Glen Cafe, Monk's Bridge, and Rushen Abbey's ruins.

The Silver Burn is joined by the Awin Ruy, a small left-bank tributary, immediately north of Ballasalla. Between Ballasalla and Castletown, the Isle of Man Railway runs parallel and close to the river, and the southernmost part of the Millennium Way also follows the river here.

== See also ==
- List of rivers of the Isle of Man
