= Embury =

Embury is a surname. Notable people with the surname include:

- Alexander Thomas Embury (1874–1956), Conservative member of the Canadian House of Commons
- Aymar Embury II (1880–1966), American architect
- David A. Embury (1886–1960), attorney and author of The Fine Art of Mixing Drinks (1948)
- Emma Catherine Embury (1806–1863), American author and poet
- Philip Embury (born 1729), Methodist preacher, a leader of one of the earliest Methodist congregations in the United States
- Shane Embury (born 1967), British musician
- Rich Embury (born 1970), Canadian international internet radio pioneer
- Sheila Embury (1931–2005), former nurse and provincial level politician from Alberta, Canada

== See also ==
- Embury Beacon, the site of an Iron Age Hill fort on the West of the Hartland Peninsula in North Devon, England
