= Silverdale Glen =

National Glen and recreational area on the Isle of Man

- Location within Isle of Man
- Length: 2.2 km (1.4 mi)

Naming
- Native name: Glion yn Awin Argid (Manx)

Geography
- Location: Ballasalla
- Country: Isle of Man
- State/Province: Sheading of Rushen
- Coordinates: 54.11°N 4.64°W
- River: Silver Burn
- Interactive map of Silverdale Glen

Silverdale Glen is a National Glen, and recreational area. It is situated near the village of Ballasalla, in the parish of Malew, on the Isle of Man. The recreation site consists of a small boating lake, café, playing fields, and a playground with a Victorian water-powered carousel.

The glen follows the Silverburn river for about half a mile, and can be accessed either from Ballasalla or from a car park off the A3 (Foxdale Road). The path through the glen forms part of the Millennium Way.

== History ==
The buildings, which now house the restaurant and craft centre, were once in the hands of the Quayle family who owned Ballasalla Cregg Mill. It was then bought by William Quine MHK, an amateur arborist who planted the area with trees and used the Silver Burn to mill flour. The glen was developed as a tourist attraction for day trips from Douglas at the end of the 19th century. After Quine's death in 1907, his son Thomas (also an MHK) took over the mill, restored the monks' well, and further developed the area. By 1910, the mill had been repurposed as a café for mass tourism in the Isle of Man and had become known as the Silverdale Tea Rooms. In 1938, the mill was sold to Cecil Joseph Mitchell who continued to promote the glen as a tourist destination.

The amusements and recreation area were bought by the Forestry, Mines & Lands Board in 1960, and the mill and café in 1962. The lower part of the glen was donated to the Manx National Trust in 1966.

== Attractions ==
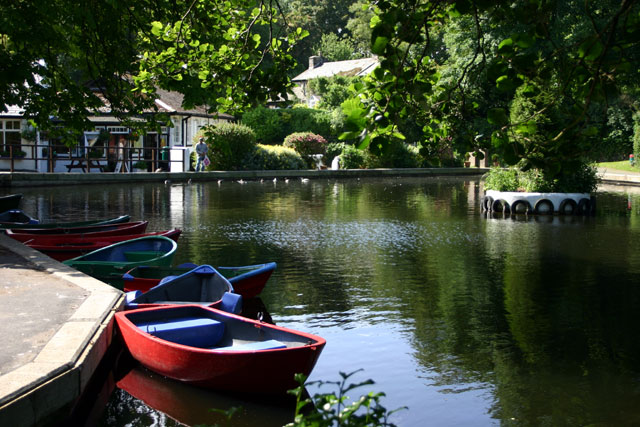
The boating lake at Silverdale Glen.

=== Boating lake ===
A small lake was created when the Silverburn river was dammed for the mill. It was then repurposed as a boating lake when the glen was developed as a tourist attraction. Pedalo boats are available for hire. The Manx Model Boat Club meets regularly at the lake.

=== Mill ===
The mill was repurposed with an extension as a café for tourists in 1910. In recent years a gift shop, crafts studio, and crafts stalls have been housed in the mill building. The water-wheel attached to the mill has been restored and is now capable of producing electricity for the mill. There is a small playground close to the mill.

=== Carousel and water-wheel ===
The Victorian carousel is powered by a water-wheel that is driven by the Silverburn river. The water-wheel originally came from the Foxdale mines where it was once a washing floor wheel. Although the carousel horses were installed in 1911, they are still in operation, with frequent refurbishments. When the carousel was first installed, an adult was needed to hold open the sluice to divert water from the river that would allow the carousel to turn.

== Walks ==
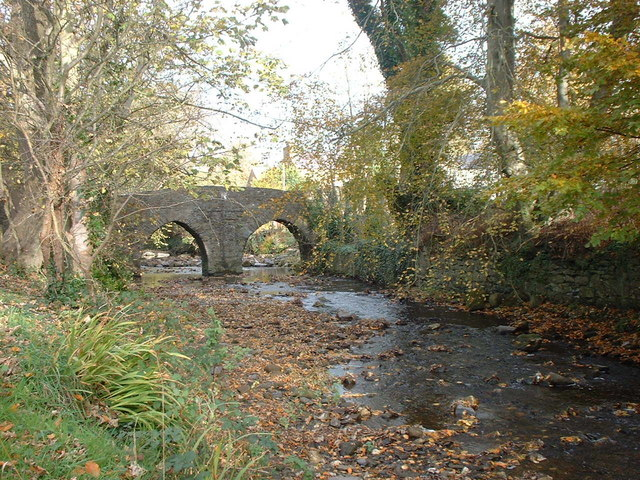
The medieval Monks Bridge over the Silverburn.

Silverdale Glen has a number of walks along the Silverburn river. A short walk goes from nearby Rushen Abbey, along the river and to Silverdale Glen. A medieval bridge dating to the 12th century built by Cistercian monks spans the river close to Rushen Abbey. A longer walk is from Rushen Abbey, along the river, and to Poulsom Park beside Castletown railway station. Walkers will also pass the Monks Well which was a popular wishing well during the height of mass tourism to the area.
