= List of hillforts in Northern Ireland =

Northern Ireland, like the rest of the British Isles, is dotted with hillforts. The Atlas of Hillforts of Britain and Ireland lists thirty-two such forts. These are classically defined as small hilltop settlements fortified with earthworks, but many are not located on hills, and probably did not function as forts. Their function is unclear; although conventionally interpreted as defensive fortifications and centres of economic political power, there is little evidence that they were ever attacked, and more recent scholarship has suggested that they may be better interpreted as monuments.

== County Antrim ==
- Ballygill North (Rathlin Island) (55.31127°N 6.24084°W), promontory fort
- Carncoagh (54.93428°N 6.22736°W), contour fort
- Carnduff (55.22109°N 6.27308°W), promontory fort
- Carravindoon (Rathlin Island) (55.2719°N 6.17919°W), promontory fort
- Carrickagile (Rathlin Island) (55.28865°N 6.17494°W), promontory fort
- Derrynaseer (54.50874°N 6.29293°W), contour fort
- Dooninish (55.23671°N 6.42553°W), promontory fort
- Dunineny Castle (55.2116°N 6.25103°W), promontory fort
- Dunmull (55.1731°N 6.605°W), partial contour fort
- Galboly Lower (55.0459°N 5.96539°W), promontory fort
- Knockdhu (54.88949°N 5.90961°W), promontory fort
- Larrybane (55.24176°N 6.35254°W), promontory fort
- Lurigethan (55.06209°N 6.08029°W), promontory fort
- Lyles Hill (54.67882°N 6.06636°W), partial contour fort
- McArt's Fort (54.64715°N 5.94815°W), promontory fort

== County Armagh ==
- Forkill (54.07717°N 6.4366°W), contour fort
- Haughey's Fort (54.34955°N 6.71625°W), multiple enclosure hillfort
- Lisbanoe (54.32265°N 6.68643°W), multiple enclosure hillfort

== County Down ==
- Coolnacran in Whyte's Estate, Loughbrickland.
- Downpatrick (54.32743°N 5.72263°W), contour fort
- Dromorebrague (54.31084°N 6.2578°W), contour fort
- Lisnagade (54.333712°N 6.330055°W), earthen ringfort
- Magheraknock (54.433881°N 5.929°W), contour fort

== County Fermanagh ==
- Doagh Glebe (54.41069°N 7.89138°W), promontory fort

== County Londonderry ==
- Dungannon Fort (55.1567°N 6.80913°W), promontory fort
- Tintagh (54.71306°N 6.71651°W), promontory fort

== County Tyrone ==
- Aghnahoo (54.66934°N 7.65978°W), multiple enclosure hillfort
- Cabragh Fort (54.4581°N 7.58521°W), contour fort
- Clogher (54.4075°N 7.17146°W), contour fort
- Clogher Demesne (54.40017°N 7.15729°W), contour fort
- Freughmore (54.55369°N 7.28132°W), contour fort
- Lisbancarney (54.4345°N 6.77071°W), multiple enclosure hillfort
- Mallabeny (54.433°N 7.21811°W), contour fort
- Tycanny (54.46773°N 7.13385°W), partial contour fort
