= Dùn Uragaig =

Coordinates: 56.10528°N 6.21264°W

Dùn Uragaig is a clifftop promontory fort located on the Inner Hebridean island of Colonsay, Scotland. The site is located at grid reference NR38169826.

The fort overlooks the inlet of Port nam Fliuchan.
