= Dùn Galláin =

Coordinates: 56.05753°N 6.26019°W

Dùn Galláin (English: Fort of the Strangers) is a promontory fort located on the Inner Hebridean island of Colonsay, Scotland. The site is located at grid reference NR34869314.

The fort overlooks the natural harbours of Tobar Fuar and Port Lobh. A battle between the islands inhabitants and invaders at Traigh an Tobair Fhuair took place to the north of Dùn Galláin.
