= Dùn Tealtaig =

Coordinates: 56.10703°N 6.20139°W

Dùn Tealtaig is a promontory fort located on the Inner Hebridean island of Colonsay, Scotland. The site is located at grid reference NR38909839.

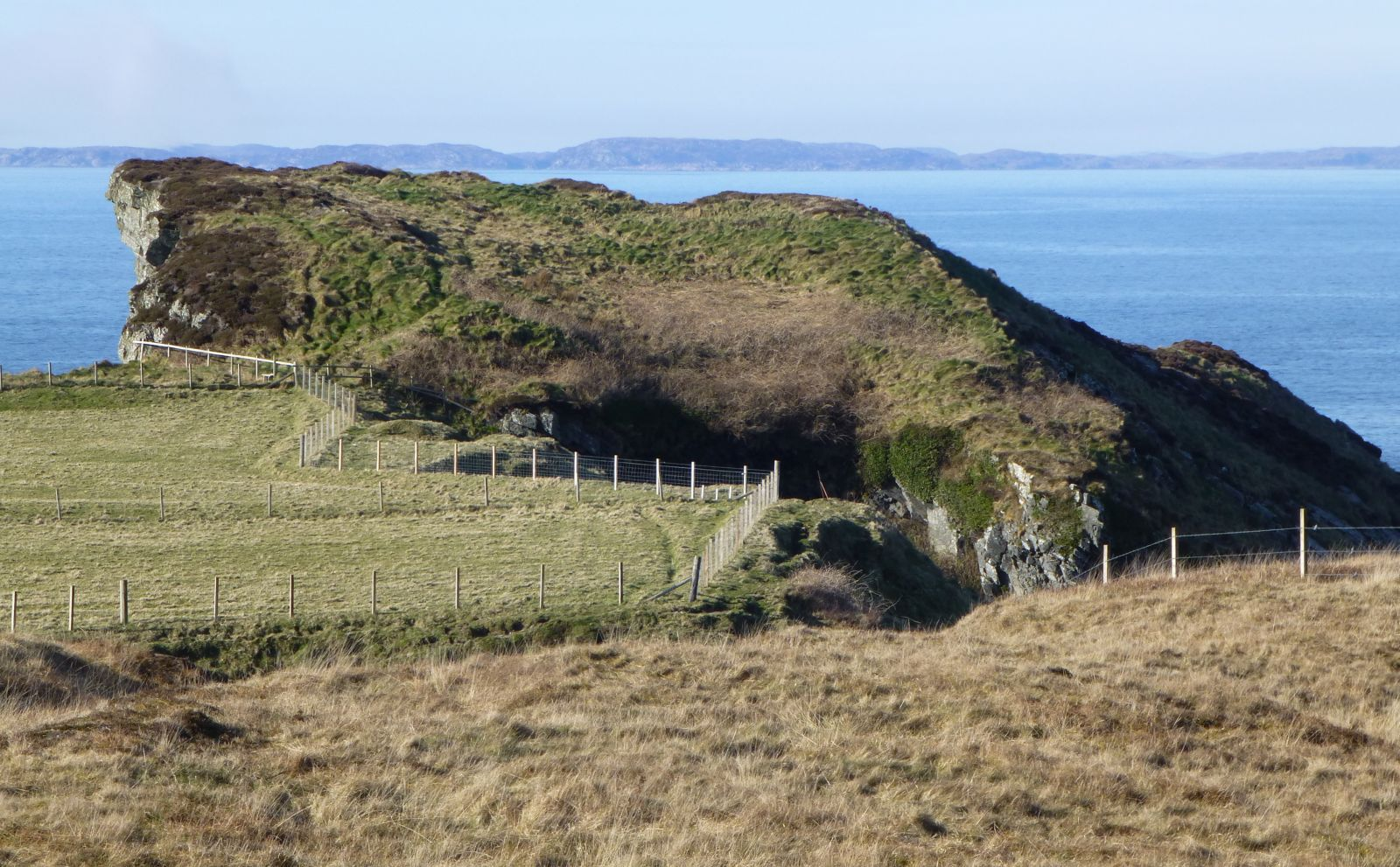
Dùn Tealtaig

The fort is located north east of Duntealtaig and overlooks Port an Tighe Mhòir and Kiloran Bay.

It was designated as a scheduled monument in 1991.
