= List of hillforts on the Isle of Man =

This is a list of hillforts on the Isle of Man. Found across Europe and the British Isles, hillforts are a type of prehistoric archaeological site dating to the Bronze Age and Iron Age, and to a lesser extent the post-Roman period. They are classically defined as small hilltop settlements fortified with earthworks, but many are not located on hills, and probably did not function as forts. Their function is unclear; although conventionally interpreted as defensive fortifications and centres of economic political power, there is little evidence that they were ever attacked, and more recent scholarship has suggested that they may be better interpreted as monuments.

According to the Atlas of Hillforts of Britain and Ireland, there are up to twenty eight extant hillforts on Mann itself, and possibly two on the Calf of Man. All but two are on the coast.

== Ayre ==
- Cashtal Ree Gorree, also known as Balyhamig, a promontory fort located on the northwestern shore of the island. The site was first reported by German archaeologist Gerhard Bersu, who surveyed the island whilst being held there as a prisoner of war, in 1949. P. J. Fowler of the RCHME revisited the site in 1984 and suggested it may in fact be a natural feature. 54.391°N 4.4793°W
- Cronk Sumark 54.3171°N 4.4736°W
- Vowlan 54.334°N 4.3846°W

== Garff ==
- Ballure 54.3159°N 4.3734°W
- The Cashtal 54.2067°N 4.4133°W
- Gob ny Garvain 54.282°N 4.3235°W
- Maughold Head 54.2983°N 4.3124°W

== Glenfaba ==
- Borrane Ballelby 54.1749°N 4.7359°W
- Borrane Creglea 54.1667°N 4.741°W
- Buggane Mooar 54.2459°N 4.6488°W
- Cronk Mooar ny Traagh 54.182°N 4.7238°W
- Niarbyl 54.1623°N 4.7396°W
- Peel Castle 54.2265°N 4.6987°W
- Port y Candas 54.2035°N 4.629°W

== Middle ==
- Cass ny Hawin 54.0909°N 4.6043°W
- Cronk ny Merriu 54.1026°N 4.5752°W
- Little Switzerland 54.1643°N 4.4706°W
- Meary Veg 54.1034°N 4.5459°W
- Purt ny Ceebagh 54.1013°N 4.5716°W
- Santon Burn 54.0931°N 4.6051°W

== Rushen ==
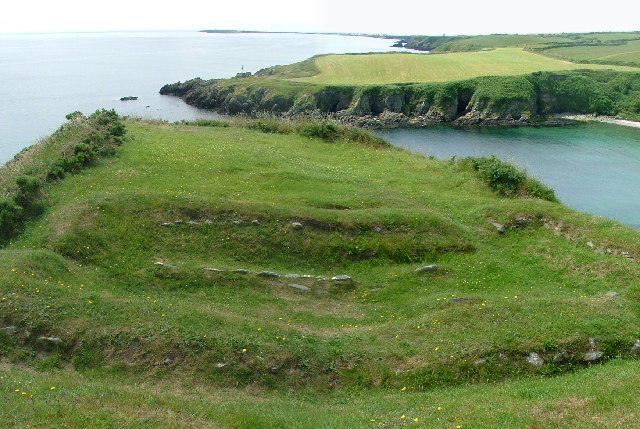
- Cronk ny Merriu
  Buroo 54.0444°N 4.8138°W
- Burroo Ned 54.0616°N 4.7877°W
- Caigher Point 54.054°N 4.8237°W
- Chapel Hill 54.0795°N 4.6819°W
- Close ny Chollagh 54.0699°N 4.6824°W
- Hango Broogh 54.0717°N 4.6081°W
- The Parade 54.0638°N 4.7932°W
- Towlfoggy 54.068°N 4.7417°W
- Langness Point 54.0549°N 4.6314°W
- South Barrule 54.1493°N 4.6688°W
