= Doonshean =

Townland in County Kerry, Ireland

Coordinates: 52°7′36″N 10°13′36″W

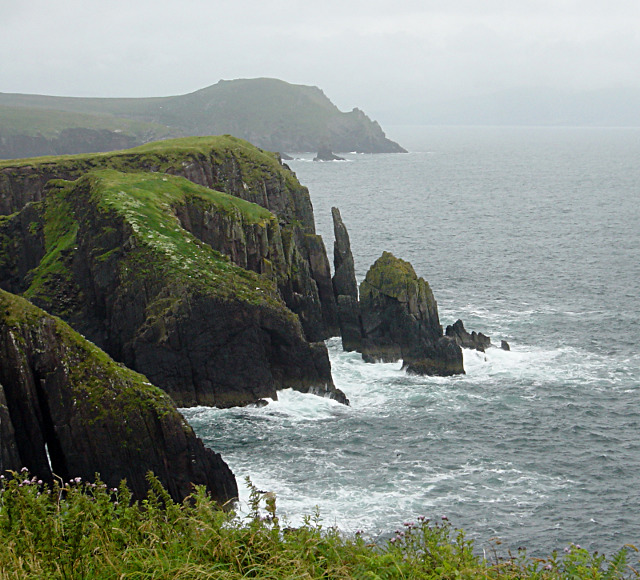
Sea stacks at Doonsheane Head

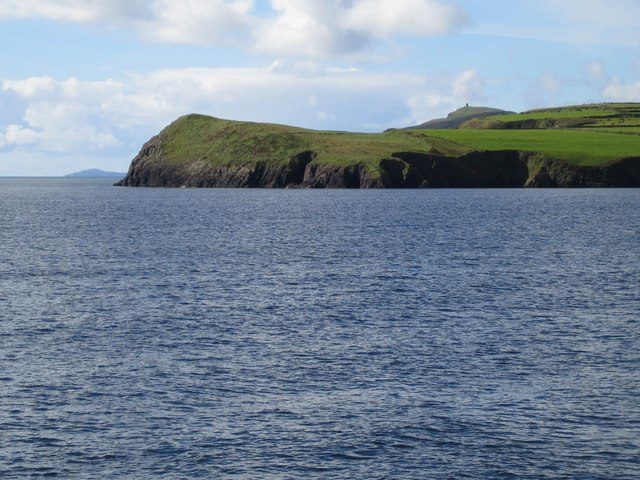
Doonsheane promontory fort

Doonshean or Doonsheane (Irish: Dún Síon or Dún Séann) is a townland in western County Kerry in Ireland. It is located about 3.8 km east from the neighbouring town of Dingle.

The area gets its name from the nearby Doonmore fort, with dún (fort) transliterated to doon, and síon deriving from the word síneadh meaning a stretch of land. The promontory fort is accessible by walking through the fields. There are also a number of other ring forts, enclosures and related archaeological sites in the area.

Dún Síon's beach has views of the village Kinard in the neighbouring parish of Lispole. The Siorrach, meaning "foal", is a sea stack which can be seen from the beach and is said to resemble a foal. The Trá Bheag, meaning "small beach", runs along the beach until it meets the sea.

== Notable people ==
The sports commentator Mícheál Ó Muircheartaigh was born in Dún Síon, and wrote a book titled From Dún Síon to Croke Park.
