= Raad ny Foillan =

Long-distance footpath in the Isle of Man

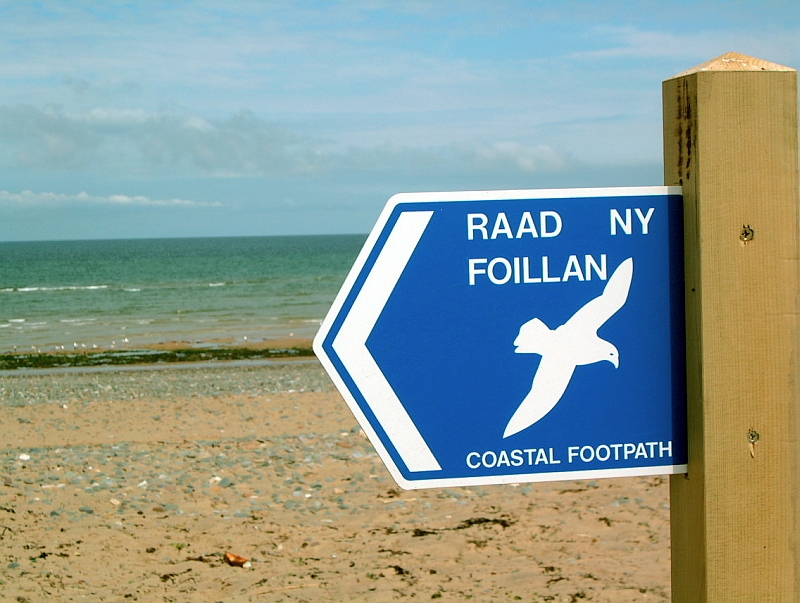
- Raad ny Foillan sign
- Length: 102 mi (164 km)
- Location: Isle of Man
- Designation: National Trail
- Trailheads: Circular: Douglas
- Use: Hiking

Raad ny Foillan (Manx for 'The Way of the Gull') is a coastal long-distance footpath in the Isle of Man. Because it is a closed loop around the coast, it can be walked in either a clockwise or an anti-clockwise direction.

== Route and history ==
The Raad ny Foillan starts and finishes at the Millennium Bridge over Douglas Harbour. The path, which is 102 miles (164 km) in length, forms a complete loop around the Manx coast, waymarked with signs showing a gull on a blue background.

The walk was created to mark the Island's "Heritage Year" celebrations in 1986 and generally follows the coast, passing through terrain varying from shingle beaches at the Ayres to over 1,400-foot-high (430 m) hills and cliffs.

The route comprises the following sections:

Isle of Man

- Douglas to Castletown, including the Langness peninsula, 19.75 miles (31.78 km)
- Castletown to Port St Mary, 6 miles (9.7 km)
- Port St Mary to Port Erin, 7 miles (11 km)
- Port Erin to Peel, 15 miles (24 km) (this section can be shortened by leaving out Bradda Head and the Niarbyl)
- Peel to Kirk Michael, 7.5 miles (12 km)
- Kirk Michael to Jurby, 7 miles (11 km)
- Jurby to Point of Ayre, 8.5 miles (14 km)
- Point of Ayre to Ramsey, 7.5 miles (12.1 km)
- Ramsey to Maughold, 5 miles (8 km)
- Maughold to Laxey, 8 miles (13 km)
- Laxey to Douglas, 10 miles (16 km)

The Fastest Known Time (FKT) for the Raad ny Foillan is 21 hours, 21 minutes and 25 seconds, set by Orran Smith (self-supported) in October 2020.

== Flora and fauna ==
The coastal sections may provide sightings of seabirds such as kittiwakes, Manx shearwaters, puffins, guillemots and sea gulls together with grey seals, and at points inland the rare Manx Loaghtan sheep on areas protected by Manx National Heritage.

== See also ==
- Bayr ny Skeddan (English: Herring Road) - a 14-mile (23 km) walk between Castletown and Peel based on the route once used by Manx fishermen.
- IOM Heritage Trail - a 10.5-mile (16.9 km) walk along disused Isle of Man Railway lines from Douglas to Peel.
- King Charles III England Coast Path
- Millennium Way - a 28-mile (45 km) walk between Castletown and Ramsey.
- Scottish Coastal Way
- Wales Coast Path
