= Saint Sanctan =

6th century bishop on the Isle of Man

Sanctain or Sanctan was a 6th-century bishop from Northern Britain, venerated as a saint in the Catholic Church and the Church of England.

Sanctan was the son of Samuel Cennísel, a king in Northern Britain. His mother was Deichter, daughter of Muiredach Muinderg, an early Dál Fiatach overking of Ulaid. He had a brother, Matócc, and was half-brother to Cybi of Holyhead.

Sanctan was an active missionary in Cumbria. The Liber Hymnorum confirms that both Sanctan and Matóc came to Ireland from Britain. Sanctán spent most of his days on the island, and is included in the list of bishops in the Book of Leinster. He was bishop of the unidentified Cell da les ("church of the two enclosures"), which could be Kilnasantan in Glenasmole in the Dublin Mountains.

He is commemorated in the Felire of Oengus. On the Isle of Man, the civil parish of Santon is named after him. His feast day is on 20 May.
