= The Braaid =

Isle of Man archaeological site

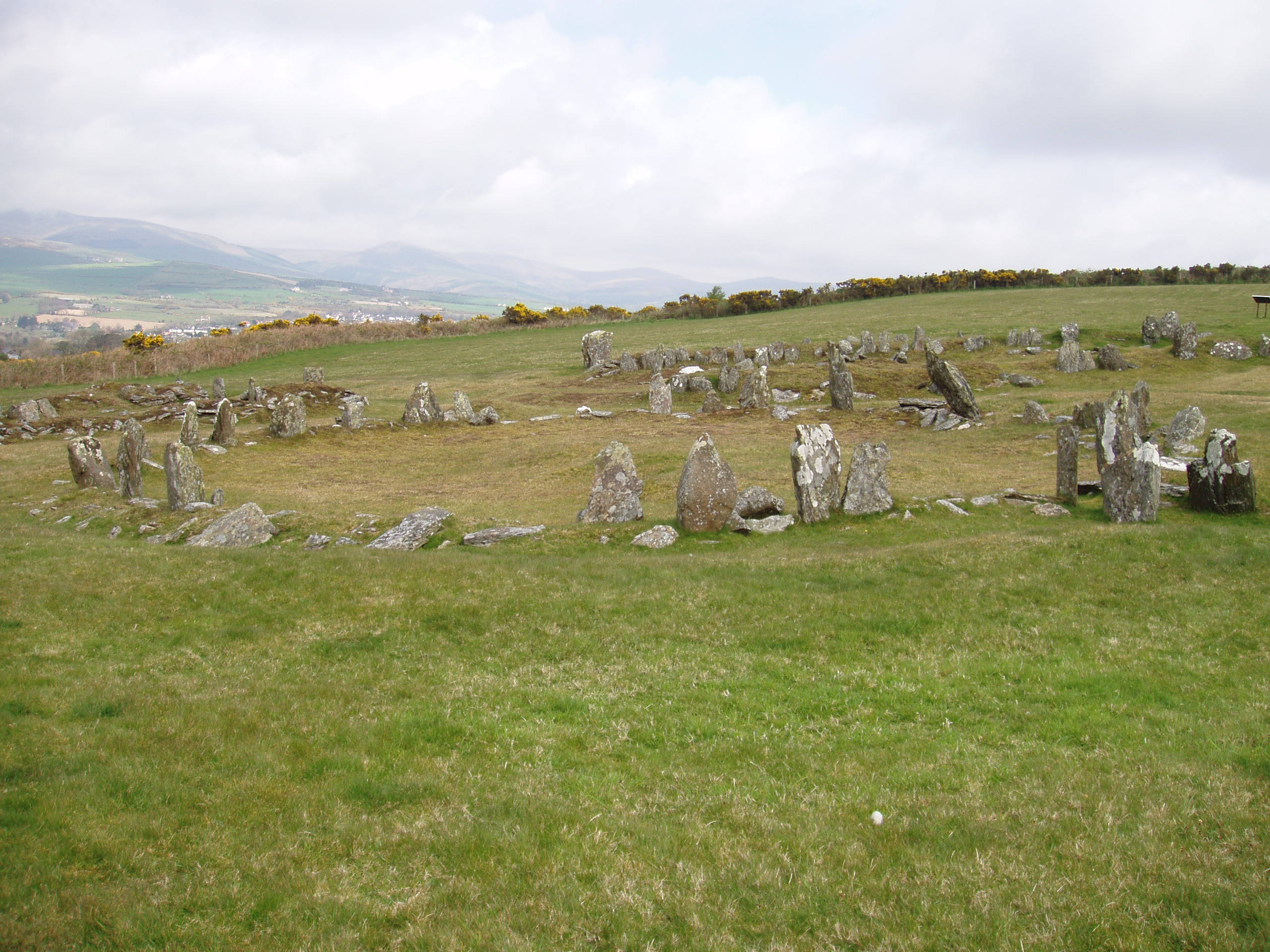
The Braaid with remnants of a roundhouse in the foreground, c. 650 A.D. In background are the remnants of two longhouses, c. 950 A.D.

The Braaid is an Iron Age roundhouse and two Norse long houses on this site represent its occupation until the 11th or 12th century AD in the parish of Marown in the Isle of Man.

Literally meaning The Gorge, the site uniquely brings together buildings of Iron Age and Viking styles that were used together and survive down to the present.

The site lies between Braaid hamlet and Mount Murray at which reference an area map can be viewed.

Also nearby is The Broogh Fort (54°08′09″N 4°34′39″W).
