= Ronaldsway A.F.C. =

Association football club on the Isle of Man

- Full name: Ronaldsway Association Football Club
- Founded: 1958
- Ground: Ronaldsway Football Ground; Ronaldsway Aircraft Company; Ballasalla; Isle of Man
- Capacity: not known
- League: Isle of Man Football League Division Two
- 2012–13: Division Two, 12th
Home colours	Away colours

Ronaldsway A.F.C. was a football club from Ronaldsway in the Isle of Man. They competed in the Isle of Man Football League and wore a royal blue kit. They played their home games at the Ronaldsway Aircraft Factory Fields in Ballasalla.

== History ==
Formed in 1958 as an extension to the Ronaldsway Aircraft Company, the club was supported by the company until 2014. The club failed to find a new playing area, and finally folded in 2015.

The club were losing finalists in the Woods Cup in 1962–64 and 1964–65.

Ronaldsway were promoted to the First Division in 1983–84 but lasted just one season there; they finished the 1984–85 season in last place, winning just one league game all season. They were promoted again in 1988–89, this time lasting until the 1991–92 season when they again finished in last place, again winning just one league game. The only trophy in the club's history came in the 1993–94 season when they won the Woods Cup, beating Laxey 1–0 in the final. The following season they were losing finalists in the Paul Henry Gold Cup.

In 1994–95 they were promoted again but finished in last place in the First Division once more the following season.

The club has a reserve team that play in the Isle of Man Football Combination.

== Facilities ==
Ronaldsway have some of the best facilities on the island with a clubhouse, spacious changing rooms and an outdoor floodlit training pitch.

== Roll Of Honours ==
- Woods Cup (1): 1993–94
  - finalists (2): 1962–63, 1964–65
