= Doonmore =

Promontory fort and national monument

- An Dún Mór (Irish)
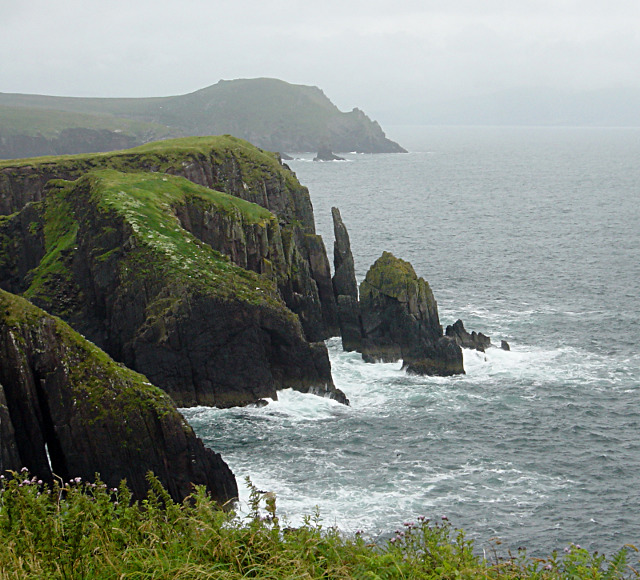
- View of the fort

- Location within Ireland
- 52.118803°N 10.221626°W
- Type: promontory fort
- Etymology: great fort
- Location: Doonsheane, Dingle Peninsula, County Kerry

History
- Built: 5th–8th centuries

Site notes
- Area: 2.93 ha (7.2 acres)
- Owner: state

National monument of Ireland
- Official name: Doonmore Promontory Fort
- Reference no.: 221.45

Doonmore is a promontory fort and National Monument located in County Kerry, Ireland.

== Location ==
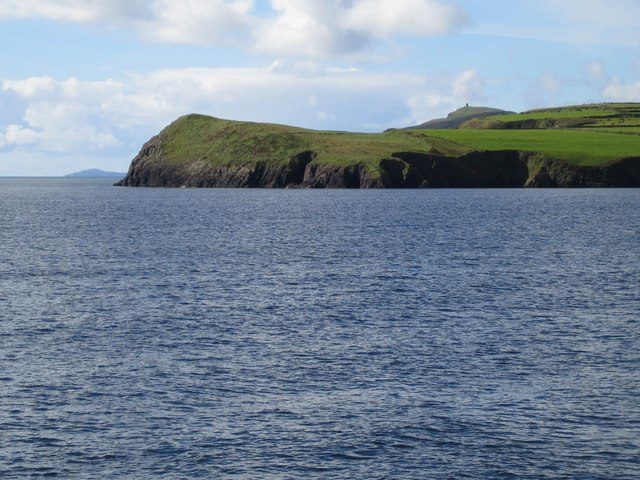
Doonmore from the water

Doonmore lies on a headland reaching into Dingle Bay, 4 km (2.5 mi) southeast of Dingle town.

== History ==
Traditionally viewed as being built by the Iron Age Veneti, promontory forts are now associated with a later date, the early Middle Ages. (5th–8th centuries AD).

== Structure ==
A headland of 2.93 ha (7.2 acres), cut off from the mainland by an artificial ditch, with complex multiple vallations and stone ramparts.
