= Katie King (curator) =

Manx curator

Katie King is a Manx curator who has served as the curator of art and social history for Manx National Heritage since 2021.

Born on the Isle of Man, King studied history at the University of Liverpool before later graduating from the University of Leicester with a Master's in museum studies.
