= Newtown, Isle of Man =

Newtown: Manx: Balley Noa
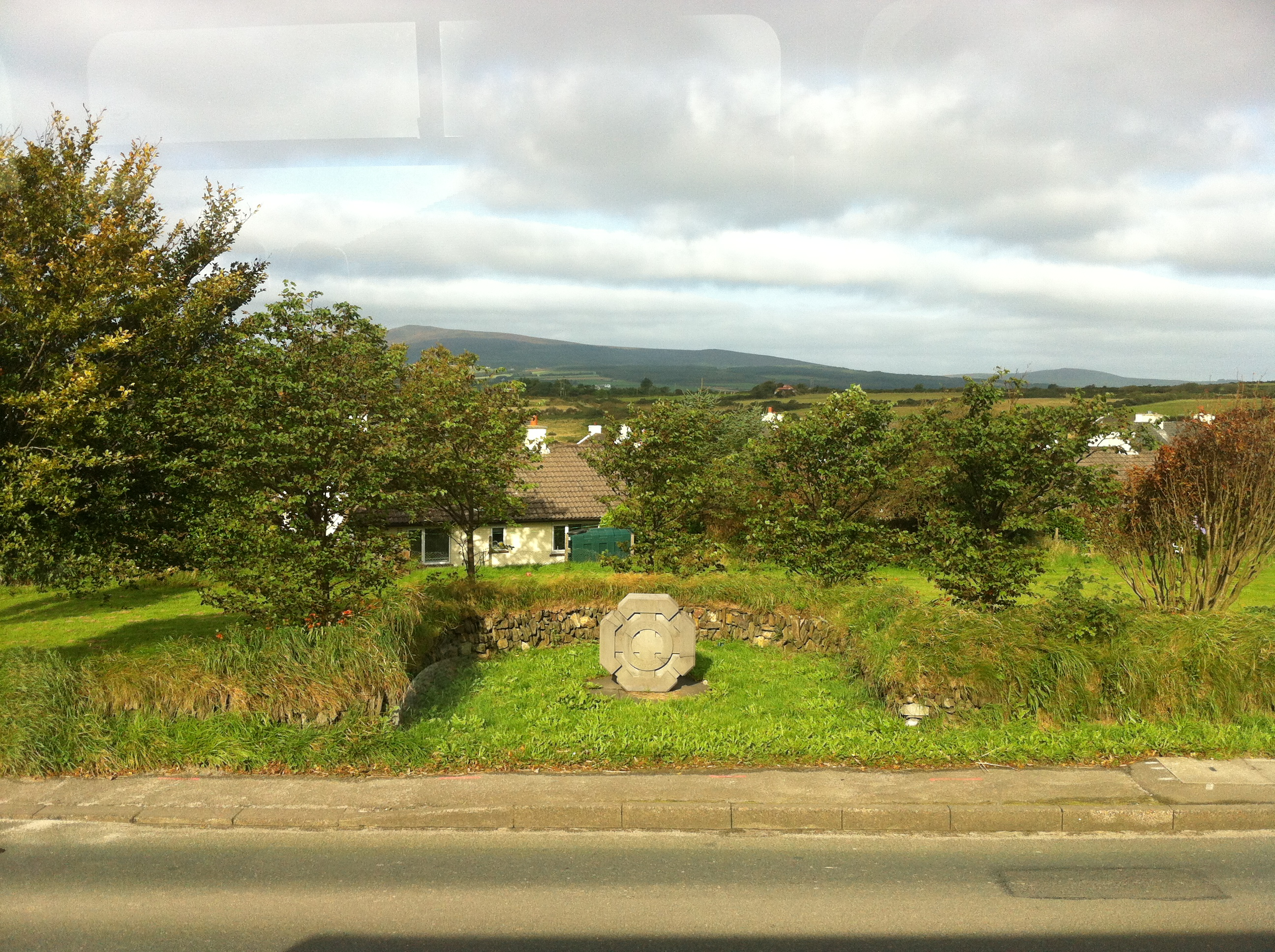
- Parish marker in Newtown

- Location within the Isle of Man
- Population: (2006 Census)
- OS grid reference: SC324736
- Parish: Santon
- Sheading: Middle
- Crown dependency: Isle of Man
- Post town: ISLE OF MAN
- Postcode district: IM4
- Dialling code: 01624
- Police: Isle of Man
- Fire: Isle of Man
- Ambulance: Isle of Man
- House of Keys: Middle

Newtown (Manx: Balley Noa) is a community within the parish of Santon, Isle of Man, 4 miles (6.4 km) west of Douglas. To the northern part of the community lies Mount Murray and to the north-west the Broogh Fort (54°08′09″N 4°34′39″W) - an Iron Age fort dating from the 13th century.

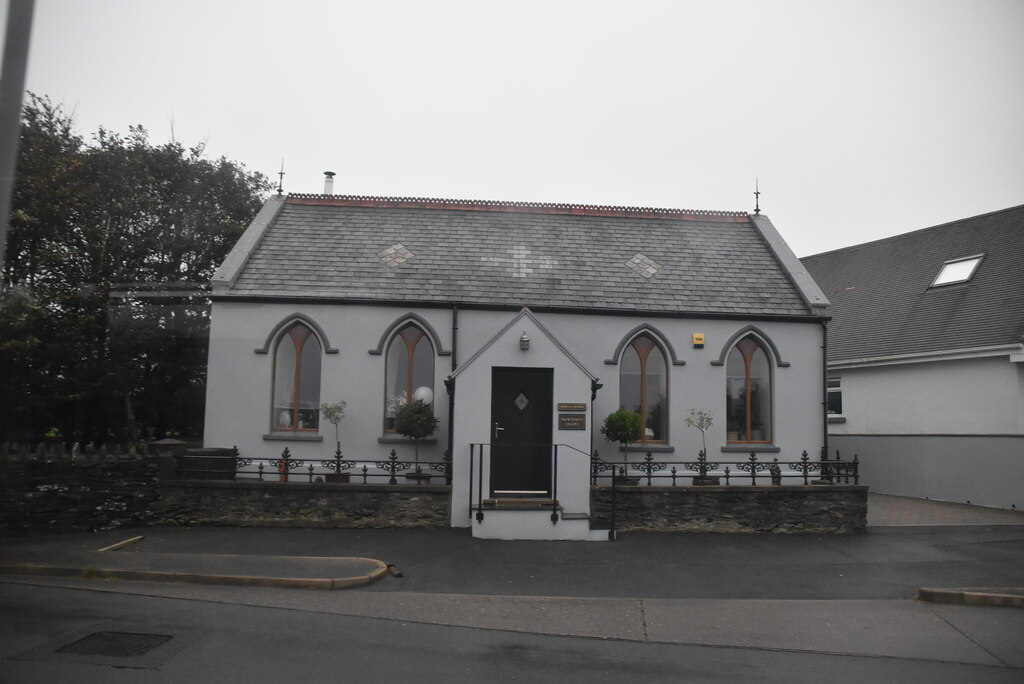
Newtown Chapel
