= Middle River (Isle of Man) =

River on the Isle of Man

Coordinates: 54.1383°N 4.5252°W

The Middle River is a river in the parish of Braddan in the Isle of Man. It runs from the Colooneys Farm area on the Marown parish border down under the original Fairy Bridge to Oakhill. The river then turns north-eastwards to run past the Pulrose Golf Club to join the River Douglas near The Nunnery.

Middle River has a length of approximately 2.5km (1.55 mi).
