= Santon Burn =

River on the Isle of Man

Coordinates: 54.1331°N 4.5906°W

Santon Burn is a watercourse in the Isle of Man.

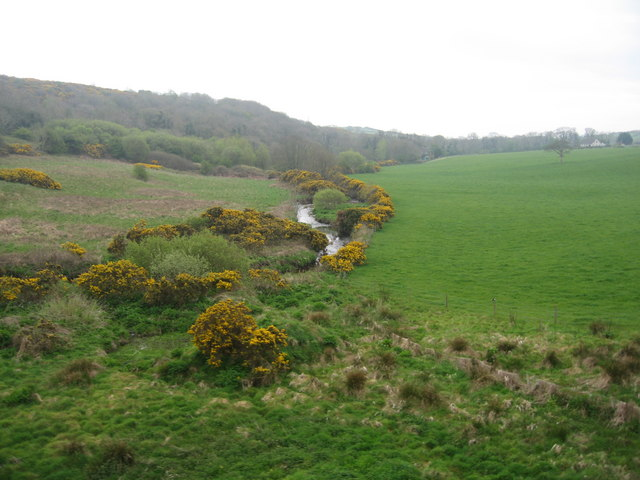
Santon Burn near Ballaglonney

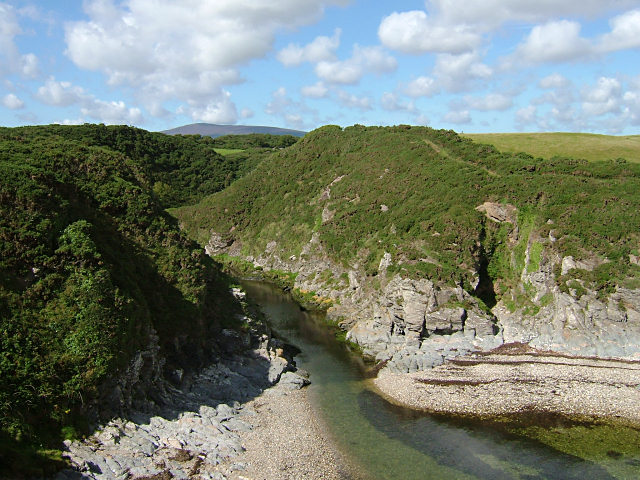
Santon Burn flowing into the Irish Sea

This small river, or burn, has its origins in the waters of Eairy in the parish of Marown (Ordnance Survey Landranger SC296779) and enters the Irish Sea at Santon Gorge close to Cass-ny-Hawin Head, just south from the bay of Port Soderick and north of Ronaldsway Airport.

The course of Santon Burn runs between the pastoral mid-island village of St. Mark's, in the parish of Malew and later via Ballalonna Glen and Fairy Bridge. The Santon Burn never enters Santon, being a border to that parish. Salmon have been recorded as far up the burn as Ballalonna Bridge (The original Fairy Bridge). In Ballalonna Glen, there is a mill race which forms part of a 15th-century flour mill, now converted into a house. Downstream is the farm house, Arragon Moar, which has been converted into the home of Dr John Taylor, the inventor, horologist and founder of Strix.
