= Mícheál Ó Muircheartaigh =

Irish Gaelic games commentator (1930–2024)

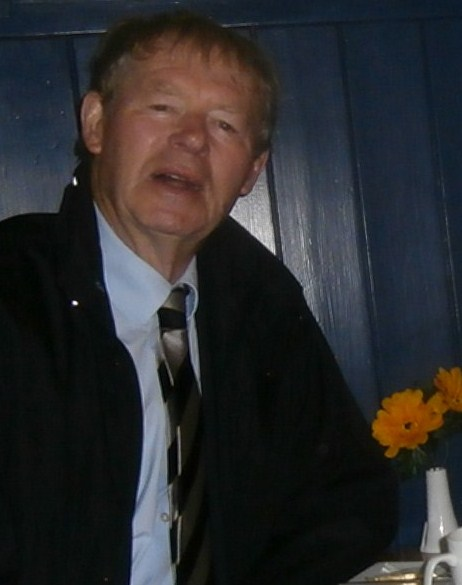
- Ó Muircheartaigh in the commentary box at the 2007 Senior Hurling Championship Final. Semple Stadium - Thurles, Tipperary
- Born: 20 August 1930; Dún Síon, County Kerry, Ireland
- Died: 25 June 2024 (aged 93); Dublin, Ireland
- Education: St Patrick's College, Dublin; University College Dublin
- Occupation: Gaelic games commentator
- Employer: RTÉ
- Predecessor: Michael O'Hehir

Mícheál Ó Muircheartaigh (Irish pronunciation: [ˈmʲiːçaːl̪ˠ oː ˈmˠɪɾʲəçəɾˠt̪ˠiː]; 20 August 1930 – 25 June 2024) was an Irish Gaelic games commentator for the Irish national radio and television, RTÉ. In a career that has spanned six decades he came to be regarded as the "voice of Gaelic games." He has been described as a national treasure. His prolific career earned him a place in Guinness World Records. Mícheál Ó Muircheartaigh Memorial Cup was named in his honour and Kerry became the first team to win division one league in March 2025 and receive the cup.

== Early life ==
Mícheál Ó Muircheartaigh was born in Dún Síon just outside Dingle, County Kerry on 20 August 1930. Ó Muircheartaigh grew up on the family farm and was educated locally in Dingle. In September 1945 he began studying at Coláiste Íosagáin in Baile Bhúirne in the County Cork Gaeltacht where he was in training to be a teacher. It was at this all-Irish school that his name changed from Michael Moriarty to the Irish version Mícheál Ó Muircheartaigh. He has said that Irish is his stronger language. In September 1948 he began the final year of his teacher training at St Patrick's College of Education in Drumcondra, Dublin.

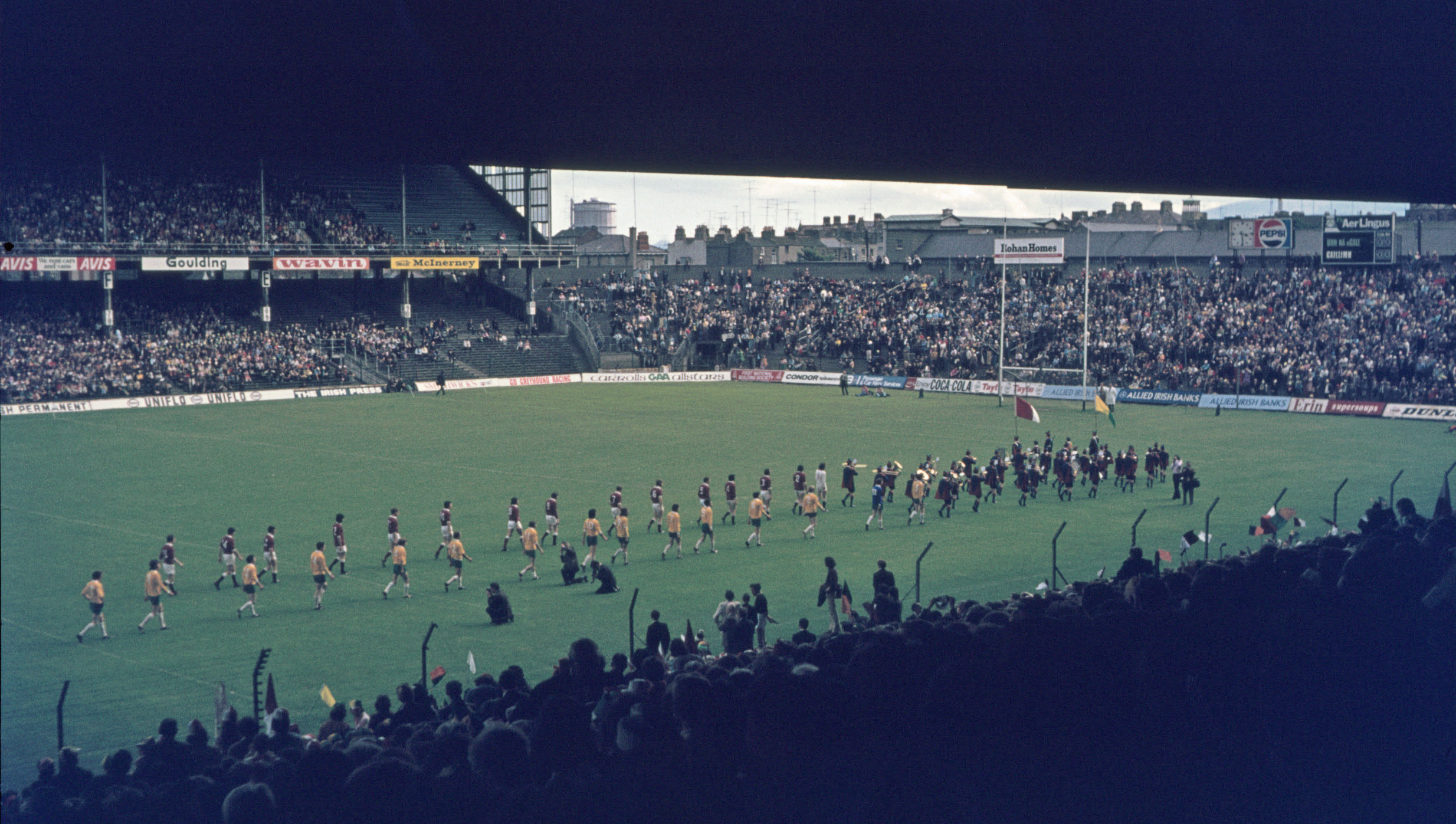
Croke Park Stadium 1974

== Broadcasting career ==
In early March 1949, Ó Muircheartaigh, along with ten other students from the college, and several from other colleges, did a test commentary on a hurling game at Croke Park. Each student had to commentate for five minutes in Irish and the most successful would be selected for further commentary work. Ó Muircheartaigh had never seen a game of hurling before in his life. But he knew that those adjudicators judging his commentary were not able to see the game:

'Twas a new game to me. But I knew one person. He was in goal for UCD and his name was Tadhg Hurley. He went to school in Dingle and he had hurling because his father was a bank manager and had spent time in Tipperary or Cork. The moment my minute started, he was saving a fantastic shot. And he cleared it away out, I can still see it, out over the sideline, Cusack Stand side of the field, eighty yards out. But it was deflected out by a member of the opposition. The adjudicators couldn't see that that didn't happen. Who was called out to take the line-ball? The only person I knew, Tadhg Hurley. And he took a beautiful line-ball—Christy Ring never took better. He landed it down in front of the Railway goal, there was a dreadful foul on the full-forward, and there was a penalty. And who was called up to take the penalty? Tadhg Hurley. 'Twas the best individual display ever seen in Croke Park. It took him at least a minute to come from the Canal goal up. And while he was coming up I spoke about his brother Bob, who was in Donal's class, and his sister who used to come out to Dún Síon strand during the summer. So eventually he took the penalty. I've seen DJ Carey, I've seen Nicky Rackard, I've seen Christy Ring. None of them could ever equal the display he gave that day... Sin mar a thosaigh sé!

Ó Muircheartaigh was the one selected and his first assignment was to provide an all-Irish commentary on the 1949 Railway Cup final on St Patrick's Day.

He graduated from St Patrick's College a little later and also completed a Bachelor of Arts degree (1952) from University College Dublin. He also completed a Higher Diploma in Education (1953). He taught economics, accountancy and Irish in both primary and secondary schools throughout Dublin, the majority of which were run by the Christian Brothers. He continued teaching up until the 1980s, when he became a full-time broadcaster with RTÉ.

For the early part of his broadcasting career Ó Muircheartaigh commentated on Minor GAA matches, in the Irish language. He also replaced the legendary Micheál O'Hehir when he was not available to commentate. Eventually when O'Hehir was forced to retire in the mid-1980s Ó Muircheartaigh took over as the station's premier radio commentator. He developed his own inimitable style of commentary and his accent was unmistakably that of a native Irish speaker. He was a true lover of Gaelic Athletic Association and it was reflected in the enthusiasm he brought to matches. His unusual turn of phrase made him a much loved broadcaster and often imitated character. He became particularly famous in Ireland for his unusual turns of phrase in the heat of the moment while commentating. Towards the end of his life he commentated on RTÉ Radio 1. In 2004 he published his autobiography, 'From Dún Sion to Croke Park'.

On 5 March 1988, he presented the Saturday Live show on RTÉ 1.

In 1990, Ó Muircheartaigh held an impromptu interview with Britain's Prince Edward, as his greyhound had won at the English Derby qualifier that he was commentating at.

Ó Muircheartaigh's commentaries for RTÉ Radio 1's Sunday Sport show won him a Jacob's Award in 1992. He was also the Parade Grand Marshal for the 2007 St Patrick's Festival, having been given the honour by the chairman of the Festival in recognition and appreciation of his unique contribution to Irish culture. He was the Parade Grand Marshal for the 2011 St Patrick's Parade in Toronto, Ontario, Canada, also in recognition and appreciation of his unique contribution to Irish culture.

On 16 September 2010, he announced his retirement from broadcasting. The last All-Ireland he commentated on was the 2010 All-Ireland Senior Football Championship Final on 19 September 2010.

On 29 October 2010, it was announced that the 2nd International Rules test at Croke Park would be Ó Muircheartaigh's final broadcast as commentator on RTÉ Radio 1.

On 30 October 2010, Ó Muircheartaigh commentated his final commentary alongside RTÉ's pundit and former Meath footballer Bernard Flynn.

He was contracted to officiate at the 2011–12 Volvo Ocean Race finish in Galway where he commentated on the finish to the round-the-world race, to give it a uniquely Irish conclusion. Sailing was a longtime hobby of Ó Muircheartaigh.

Ó Muircheartaigh wrote a weekly sports column for Foinse, the Irish-language newspaper free with the Irish Independent each Wednesday.

Ó Muircheartaigh was invited to read out a piece in Irish and in English at an event called "Laochra" in Croke Park on 24 April 2016 to commemorate the 100th anniversary of the Easter Rising.

Ó Muircheartaigh's nephew by marriage, John McGuire, has presented several programmes on RTÉ.

In 2007, Ó Muircheartaigh was awarded the UCD Foundation Day Medal.

== Death ==
Ó Muircheartaigh died at a hospital on 25 June 2024, at the age of 93.

== Other media ==
Ó Muircheartaigh is the main commentator in the 2005 video game Gaelic Games: Football for the PlayStation 2 and its 2007 sequel.

He was featured in the video "Mícheál Ó Muircheartaigh - Making a ham sandwich" which was posted on a Reddit forum, noting his "relaxing" voice.

== Honours ==
Ó Muircheartaigh was awarded an honorary doctorate by NUI Galway in 1999 for his lifetime service to broadcasting.

Shortly after his 90th birthday, Ó Muircheartaigh was awarded the only All Star of 2020. No further All Stars could be awarded as competition was suspended due to the COVID-19 pandemic and only completed that December.

== Bibliography ==
- From Dún Síon to Croke Park - The Autobiography Micheál Ó Muircheartaigh ISBN 978-1-84488-045-4
