= Santon, Isle of Man =

Parish on the Isle of Man

Coordinates: 54.121°N 4.581°W

Santon: Manx: Stondane
- Parish of Santon, Isle of Man
- Population: 749
- OS grid reference: SC313726
- Sheading: Middle
- Crown dependency: Isle of Man
- Post town: ISLE OF MAN
- Postcode district: IM5
- House of Keys: Middle

Santon (Manx: Stondane), historically Santan, is one of the seventeen historic parishes of the Isle of Man.

It is located in the south-east of the island (part of the traditional South Side division) in the sheading of Middle.

Settlements in the parish include Newtown.

== Local government ==
For the purposes of local government, the whole of the historic parish forms a single parish district with commissioners.

The Captain of the Parish (since 2003) is Donald James Gelling, CBE.

== Politics ==
Santon parish is part of the Middle constituency, which elects two members to the House of Keys. From 1986 until 2016 it was in the Malew and Santon constituency.

== Geography ==
It has an area of approximately 8 square miles (21 km^{2}) and is the island's smallest parish. The parish is now popularly known as Santon instead of the older Santan. Currently the Captain of the Parish is Mr Donald Gelling.

To the north of the parish is Newtown and the recently built estate of Mount Murray where the northern border along the Crogga River Glen is to be found. The western boundary is slightly east of Ballalonna Glen and the modern Fairy Bridge. The coastal extremities stretch from the mouth of the Crogga River at Port Soderick over Santon Head, Port Grenaugh and Port Soldrick to the mouth of the Santon Burn which rarely encroaches on Santon territory but forms the northwestern (inland) boundary for much of its course.

While the parish lacks size and good soil, it does have some high cliffs, ancient monuments, ruins, and various other scenery.

All along the Manx coastline, and particularly on the rocky slate headlands of the south, are the remains of promontory forts which date back almost 2,000 years. Four out of more than twenty have been excavated and several, especially in Santon, can be visited using the coastal footpath. All have a rampart on their vulnerable landward side, and excavations at Cronk ny Merriu have shown that access to the fort was by a strongly built gate.

The Scandinavians who arrived in Mann in the 8th and 9th centuries sometimes re-used these Iron Age promontory forts, often obliterating the old domestic quarters with their characteristic rectangular houses; the fine example at Cronk ny Merriu has been used as the basis of the reconstruction in the House of Manannan.

== Demographics ==
The Isle of Man census of 2016 returned a parish population of 700, an increase of 1.3% from the figure of 691 in 2011.

Santon (census)
Year	1996	2001	2006	2011	2016	2021
Pop.	422	580	680	691	700	749
±%	—	+37.4%	+17.2%	+1.6%	+1.3%	+7.0%

== Ecclesiastical parish ==
The ecclesiastical parish of Santon no longer exists as a separate area. Until 1 November 2012 it was coterminous with the civil parish (see below), but on that date part of the ecclesiastical parish of Braddan between Mount Murray and Port Walberry, including part of the Mount Murray estate, Port Soderick and Quine's Hill, was transferred to the parish of Santon. On 1 February 2013 the parish of Santon and the parish of Malew (except a detached part of the latter to the west of Castletown) were united to form a new ecclesiastical parish of Malew and Santon. The parish church of the former parish of Santon, which is now one of the four parish churches of the united parish, is St Sanctain. St Sanctain's stands on the site of an ancient 1500-year-old chapel Keeill - well before St. Augustine came from Rome to Canterbury. The name St Sanctain is of Irish origin and according to legend, the saint was a disciple of St Patrick and Bishop of Cell da Les (Church of Two Forts). Occasioned by an error, the church was referred to as St Ann (or Anne) during the 17th century and this lasted until it was officially corrected in 1891.

The living of Santon was in the patronage of the Crown, in the person of Her Majesty the Queen, the Lord of Mann. Before the dissolution of the monasteries, it was in the hands of the Abbot of Rushen Abbey. The united benefice of Malew and Santon is also in the patronage of the Crown. When the Queen appoints a new vicar, the Lieutenant Governor receives presentment documents signed by the Queen. At the Service of Institution and induction of a new vicar, these documents, together with the new vicar, are presented by the Lieutenant Governor to the Bishop of Sodor and Man with the request that the Bishop institute the nominee of the Crown. This duty is always carried out by the Governor in person.
