= Atlas of Hillforts of Britain and Ireland =

Online database of hillforts

The Atlas of Hillforts of Britain and Ireland was an online database of hillforts―fortified settlements built in the Bronze Age and Iron Age―in the British Isles. It was compiled by researchers from the University of Edinburgh, the University of Oxford and University College Cork, led by Ian Ralston and Gary Lock. On its launch in 2017, the atlas had 4,147 entries, which the researchers believe to be all of the extant hillforts in Britain and Ireland. A printed atlas is also planned.

The data was collated from existing catalogues of archaeological sites such as the National Monuments Records and county historic environment records. Around 100 volunteers, described as "citizen scientists", also visited sites and contributed information and photographs to the atlas. The researchers noted that despite the conventional name "hillforts", under their definition, many are "not on hills and are not really forts". They included sites that are now only visible through cropmarks.

The online atlas was hosted by the Arts and Humanities Research Council, which funded the project, and makes use of Esri's ArcGIS web map application platform. The project also collaborated with Wikimedia UK to make the information in the atlas available to Wikipedia.

== See also ==
- List of hillforts
- Hillforts in Britain
- Hillforts in Scotland
