= National Monuments Record =

National Monuments Record (NMR) may refer to one or more of the following:

- the former National Monuments Record (England): then English Heritage Archive (EHA), now Historic England Archive (HEA)
- National Monuments Record of Scotland (NMRS)
- National Monuments Record of Wales (NMRW)

== See also ==
- List of national archives
- National monument
- Sites and Monuments Record
- Site of Special Scientific Interest (SSSI)
