= List of hillforts in the Peak District =

Hillforts in the English Peak District

This is a partial list of hillforts in the Peak District of England, arranged alphabetically. Most lie within the Peak District National Park. The sites are typically protected Scheduled Monuments.

Name	Image	Location	County	Notes	Refs
Ball Cross		Near Bakewell SK 2278 6912	Derbyshire	Small promontory fort on a spur of Calton Hill (south of Ballcross Farm). Findings date from the Iron Age and Bronze Age.	
Burr Tor		Great Hucklow SK 1799 7832	Derbyshire	Oval prehistoric enclosure. About 400m by 170m. It is now Camphill Airfield, home of Derbyshire and Lancashire Gliding Club.	
Carl Wark		Near Hathersage SK 2595 8143	Derbyshire	Fortified outcrop of Millstone Grit on Hathersage Moor. About 180m by 60m. Considered to date back to the Iron Age with evidence of use in Roman times.	
Castle Dike		Langsett SE 2063 0081	South Yorkshire	Earthwork bank and ditch of an Iron Age univallate hillfort or enclosure. About 90m by 50m, on the flat top of Gilbert Hill.	
Castle Naze		Near Chapel-en-le-Frith SK 0533 7843	Derbyshire	Iron Age promontory hillfort on Combs Moss. Triangular in shape with sides of about 200m.	
Castle RIng		Near Youlgreave SK 2207 6284	Derbyshire	It now consists of an oval earthwork ditch (about 5m wide and 100m across) with inner and outer banks, up to 2m high. It hasn't been excavated but it is considered to be an integral part of the Bronze Age landscape of Harthill Moor.	
Fin Cop		Near Ashford in the Water SK 1743 7089	Derbyshire	An Iron Age hillfort in Monsal Dale, constructed between 440BC and 390BC.	
Mam Tor		Near Castleton SK 1277 8361	Derbyshire	A univallate fort on the summit of the hill. About 400m by 300m. Nearby bowl barrows date from the Neolithic period and Bronze Age.	

== See also ==
- List of hillforts in England
- Scheduled monuments in Derbyshire
