= Cronk ny Merriu =

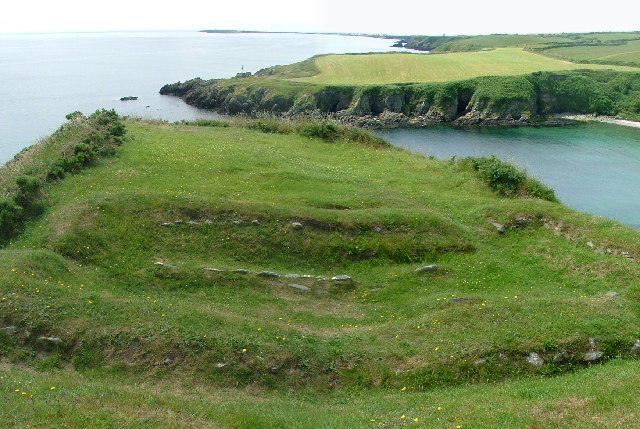
- Interactive map of Cronk ny Merriu
- 54.1026°N 4.5750°W
- Location: Parish of Santon, Isle of Man

History
- Built: Iron Age

Site notes
- Architectural style: Promontory fort
- Owner: Manx National Heritage

Cronk ny Merriu (Manx for 'hill of the dead'), located close to Port Grenaugh, is one of the remains of promontory forts in the Isle of Man. Cronk ny Merriu was previously considered by historians to be a prehistoric burial place due to its large grass-covered bank and name, literally translating to "Hill of the Dead". The bank and ditch created a defensive promontory fort at Cronk ny Merriu. Later, a rectangular building of Norse style and layout stood here, part of a system of coastal lookout posts used to protect the coastline and to police beach markets. Excavations of Cronk ny Merriu show that there was very little domestic activity, and that the Norse building likely didn't have permanent residency. It's suggested that the longhouse was primarily a building for those at nearby forts to shelter from harsh weather, rather than a place of defence itself. Although no scientific dating has been done, due to the similarities with fortified headlands throughout the British Isles, archeologists strongly believe that this site dates back to the Iron Age.

Several of the lookout posts, especially in Santon, where Cronk ny Merriu is situated, can be visited using the coastal footpath. The posts were protected with a deep ditch and a rampart strengthened by large stones on their vulnerable landward side. There'd also be a heavily protected gateway, with ramparts built up on either side, for those seeking shelter in the fort.

The Scandinavians who arrived in Mann in the eighth and ninth centuries sometimes re-used these Iron Age promontory forts, often obliterating the old domestic quarters with their characteristic rectangular houses; the example at Cronk ny Merriu has been used as the basis of the reconstruction of the House of Manannan museum in Peel.

== Etymology ==
In the Manx language Cronk (hill) ny Merriu ('the dead') means literally 'hill of the dead'.
