= Kewaigue =

Kewaigue is an area, hill and school near White Hoe in the parish of Braddan, near to Douglas, Isle of Man

== Photographs ==
- White Hoe, Kewaigue, Braddan - The famous Okells Brewery
- White Hoe (at Ellenbrook), Kewaigue- The new bridge and old "Snotty Bridge".
