= Braddan =

Parish on the Isle of Man

Coordinates: 54.181°N 4.489°W

Braddan: Manx: Braddan
- Parish of Braddan, Isle of Man
- Population: 3,586
- OS grid reference: SC3758779015
- Sheading: Middle
- Crown dependency: Isle of Man
- Post town: ISLE OF MAN
- Postcode district: IM4
- House of Keys: Middle

Braddan (Manx: Braddan) is one of the seventeen parishes of the Isle of Man.

It is located on the east of the island (part of the traditional South Side division) in the sheading of Middle.

Administratively, a small part of the historic parish of Braddan is now covered by part of the borough of Douglas, the capital and largest town of the Isle of Man.

Other settlements in the parish include Port Soderick, Strang, Tromode and Union Mills.

== Local government ==
For the purposes of local government, the majority of the historic parish forms a single parish district with five elected Commissioners:

Party	Seats
Independent	4
Green	1

In 1896, a small area in the south-east of the historic parish of Braddan became part of the borough of Douglas, since when it has been governed by a municipal corporation with 18 councillors and an elected mayor.

The Captain of the Parish (since 1996) is Thomas Philip Caley.

== Politics ==
Braddan parish district is part of the Middle constituency, which elects two Members to the House of Keys.

The part of the historic parish which falls under the Borough of Douglas elects MHKs to the separate Douglas constituencies.

== Geography ==
Braddan is an elongated parish, stretching from Druidale in the north to Port Soderick in the south. It is nearly 10 miles (16 km) from north to south, but less than 1 km (0.6 mi) wide in two places. It borders the parishes of Michael and Lezayre in the north, German, Marown and Onchan in the middle and Santon in the south. The name Braddan is another form of Brendan, an Irish saint and patron of voyagers.

The northern end of the parish is mountainous and uninhabited. The southern end is flatter and includes the village of Union Mills and nearby residential areas bordering Douglas to the west and north-west.

The Middle River runs through the parish in the Kewaigue - Oakhill area in the south, where the original Fairy Bridge can be found.

The parish church (Kirk Braddan, 1876) is by John Loughborough Pearson. The former parish church (Old Kirk Braddan, 1777) contains some ancient crosses.

Hampton Court House, near Port Soderick, was built c. 1800 by Thomas Stowell, a leading Manx advocate who became acting Attorney General in 1796 and Clerk of Rolls in 1804.

== Demographics ==
The Isle of Man census of 2016 returned a parish population of 3,621, an increase of 1% from the figure of 3,586 in 2011. However, there has been a decline in population since then, as evidenced by the Isle of Man census of 2021, which recorded a population of 3,404.

Braddan (census)
Year	1996	2001	2006	2011	2016	2021
Pop.	2,527	2,665	3,151	3,586	3,621	3,404
±%	—	+5.5%	+18.2%	+13.8%	+1.0%	−6.0%

== Eccesiastical parish ==
The ecclesiastical parish of Braddan formerly comprised the parish district of Braddan (above) and almost the whole of the present borough of Douglas. The ecclesiastical parishes of St George, St Barnabas (now merged with St George), St Matthew, St Thomas and St Ninian, Douglas were established in the 19th and early 20th centuries, and the only parts of the borough now remaining in the ecclesiastical parish are the Anagh Coar, Ballaughton and Farmhill suburbs. The Baldwin area, with the chapel of St Luke's, was transferred in 1978 to the ecclesiastical parish of Marown (now Marown, Foxdale and Baldwin). On 1 November 2012 an area between the Middle River and Douglas Head was transferred to the parish of St Matthew, and an area between Mount Murray and Port Walberry, including part of the Mount Murray estate, Port Soderick and Quine's Hill, was transferred to the parish of Santan (now Malew and Santan).
