= Mount Murray =

Hill on the Isle of Man

- y Cronk Glass
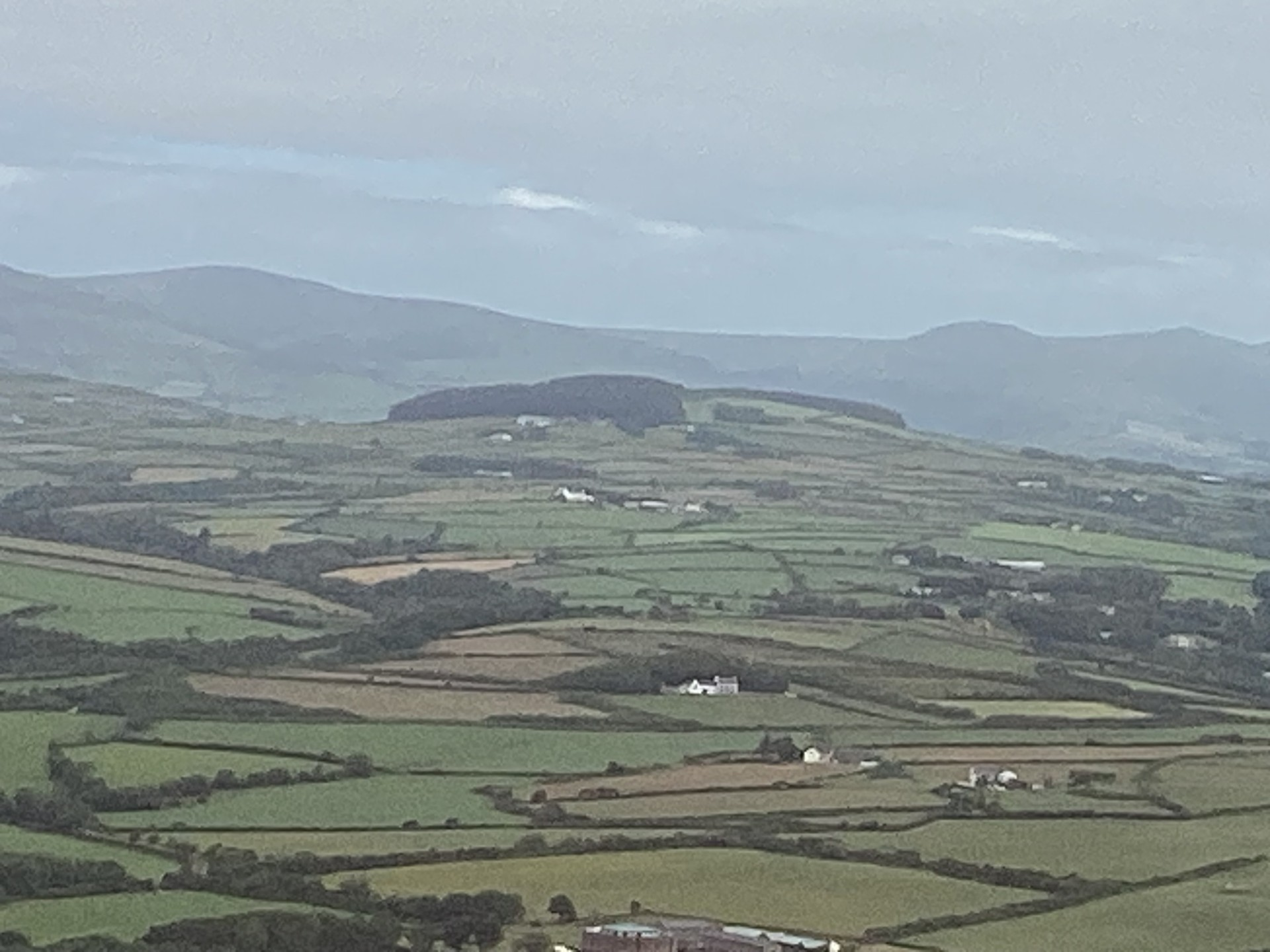
- Mount Murray in the near ground

Highest point
- Elevation: 222 m (728 ft)
- Coordinates: 54°08′21″N 4°33′39″W

Geography
- Location within Isle of Man
- Location: Santon, Isle of Man

Mount Murray is a hill 222 metres (728 ft) above sea level on the Isle of Man located at the northern end of Santon, near the boundaries with Marown and Braddan parishes. It is named after Lord Henry Murray, 4th Lieutenant Governor of the Isle of Man. Often referred to simply as The Mount and formerly as Cronk Glass (green hill), Mount Murray is home to the Chibbanagh Plantation and nine of the eighteen holes of the Mount Murray Golf Club.

== History ==
The hill was originally known as Ais Hólt, meaning Holt's Hill, and giving rise to derivations of the name: Ash hole (1703), Ashold (1734) and Ashole (1739). Several families of the latter name lived in the Castletown area in the 16th century. It was a Norse surname and is still found in Kildare and Wicklow, Ireland.

=== Mount Murray Estate ===
In the early part of the 18th Century the hill and surrounding area was acquired by a Dublin merchant, Richard McGwire, who applied to enclose an area of common land. The estate was subsequently sold, changing hands to various people during which time it was rented to Sir Wadsworth Busk before being acquired by Lord Henry Murray in 1793, following which it formed part of the Mount Murray Estate. Situated approximately 4 miles (6.4 km) from Douglas, it was the home of the Murray family when the Rt Honourable Lord Henry Murray, the fourth son of the John Murray, 3rd Duke of Atholl was the Lieutenant Governor of the Isle of Man.

A stone which was inserted into the walls of the mansion recorded that: "This estate, by ye Hon. Worthy Governor Murray, was called Moor Hall."

==== Mount Murray Hotel ====
Following Murray's ownership the hall went through various changes, until by 1885 it was suffering from damp and neglect. It was then purchased by a Mr S. Marsden who set about restoring it to its former grandeur, and converting it into a hotel. Although significantly altering its external appearance, part of Marsden's alterations saw the construction of a tower which was added to the front portion of the building and afforded wide views across the estate.

The original Mount Murray Hotel was acquired by Alec O'Brien in 1958 following which it underwent significant redevelopment work and reopened as the Alex Inn. The Alex Inn finally closed during the late 1960s or early 1970s following which most of the buildings were demolished.

==== Mount Murray Resort ====
On 17 January 1991 an application for planning approval in principle dated 16 January 1991 was received in the Planning Committee Secretary's Office in the Department of Local Government and the Environment for the Isle of Man. The applicant was Radcon Village Resorts Limited of 1 Mount Pleasant, Douglas, Isle of Man. The description of the site to be developed was given as Alex Inn, Mount Murray, Santon, Isle of Man. The proposed use of the site was given as “Resort Village". It was built under a 'tourism' approval and formed the center of several investigations into why people were purchasing and living in the houses.

In August 2000 Professor Stephen Crow, an experienced and respected figure in the planning field, was appointed by the Chief Minister and Council of Ministers to conduct an Inquiry into some matters concerning the development at Mount Murray. His precise terms of reference were: “To review the planning and development history of the Mount Murray site, and to report on the residential aspects of that development having regard particularly to: a) the nature of the title of those who have purchased residential property; b) whether all parts of the development have sufficient planning and building regulation approvals; c) whether the infrastructure for the development is sufficient and in accordance with planning approvals; d) whether all conditions imposed as part of any approval for the site have been fully met.” Some £1 million was spent on the investigations which failed to prove any wrongdoing.

In November 2013 a fire broke out at the Mount Murray Hotel and Country Club whilst the venue was undergoing alterations. The fire resulted in significant damage to the main hotel area following which the venue closed.

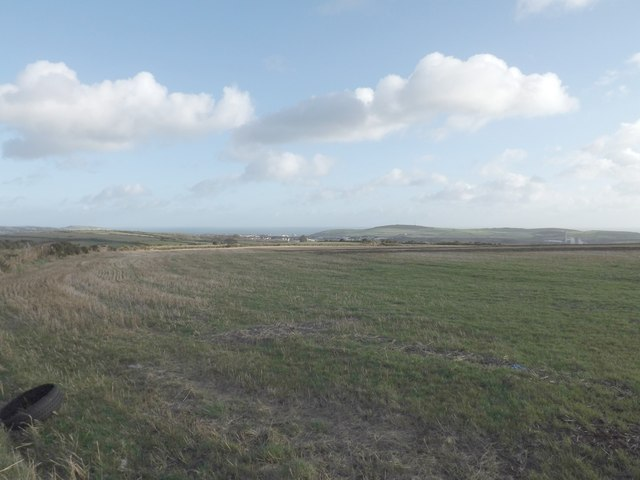
View from Mount Murray Back Road

In February 2016 the site was bought by Isle of Man based Comis Holdings who plan to reopen the Mount Murray as a sport and leisure complex.

== Landscape and archaeology ==
Close by are The Broogh Fort (54°08′09″N 4°34′39″W) and also The Braaid.

The Graveyard, the fifth fairway of the Mount Murray golf course, is on the site of a prehistoric burial ground. The burial ground became the site of a keeill built sometime after the 9th century, and the area later became known as Speke Farm. The keeill and some of the surrounding burials were excavated in 2006 by archaeological television programme Time Team. The first mention of the keeill at Speke, is on a Mount Murray Estate map (1800) which shows a small rectangular east–west aligned building in an enclosure marked as ‘old chapel’.
