= Millennium Way =

Long distance footpath on the Isle of Man

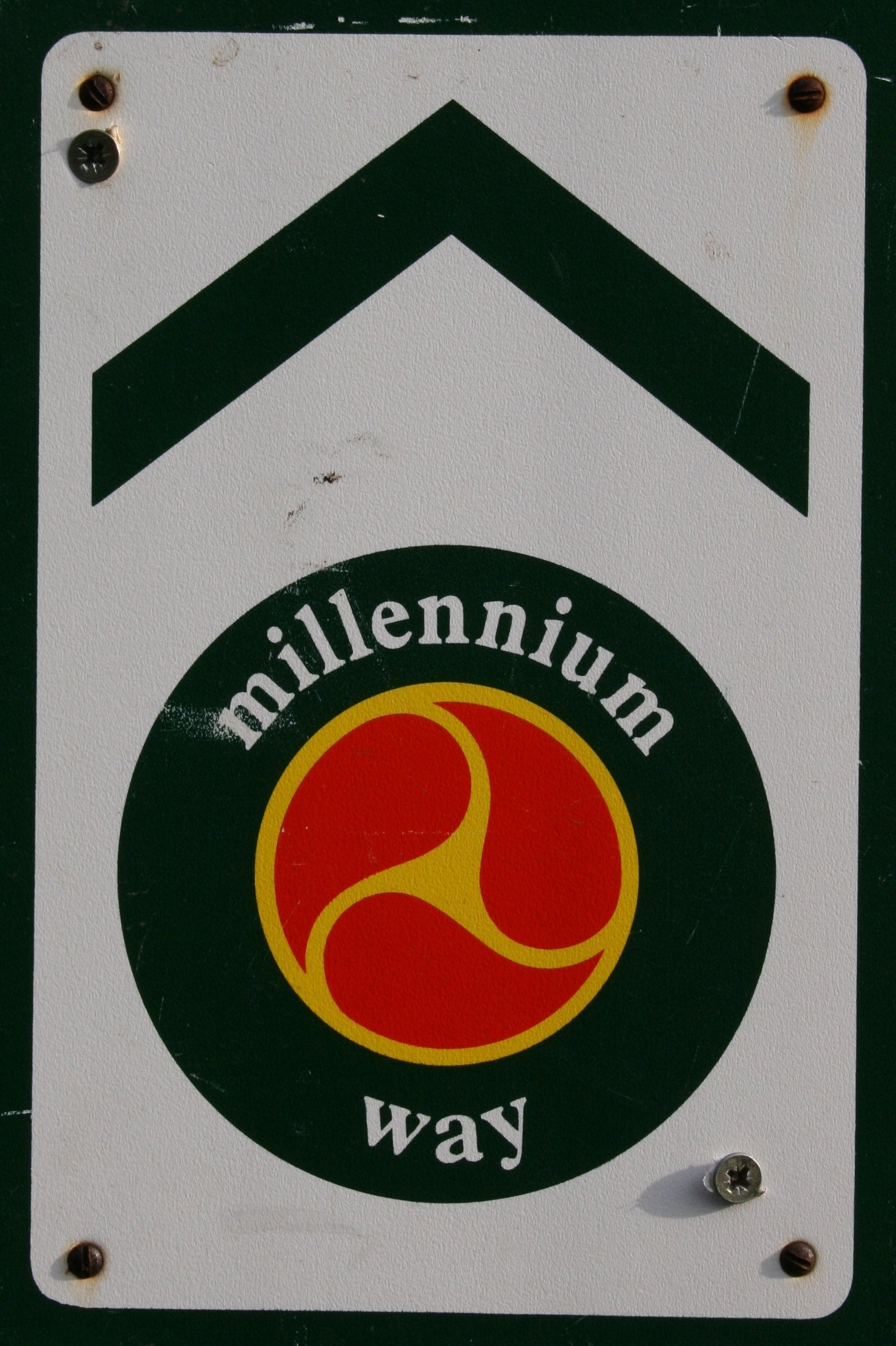
Millennium Way signpost

The Millennium Way is a long distance footpath on the Isle of Man. The path is approximately 28 miles (45 km) in length, stretching between Castletown and Ramsey.

The footpath was opened in 1979 to mark the thousandth year of the parliament of the Island, Tynwald.

From the southern end, the path leads northwards from Castletown along the Silver Burn, passing through Ballasalla with its Abbey and Monks' Bridge. The route then follows a number of minor roads as far as Crosby (a convenient place to break the walk into 2 days) where it crosses the main road from Douglas to Peel, leaves the road, and starts to climb. Skirting the eastern side of Slieau Ruy, it drops down slightly to the hamlet of West Baldwin and then ascends the ridge to reach its highest elevation of around 460 metres (1,510 ft) near Beinn-y-Phott. After crossing two roads, the path then skirts the western side of Snaefell and continues along a ridge to reach the road at Sky Hill, just short of Ramsey.

== See also ==
- Raad ny Foillan (English: The Way of the Gull) is a 95-mile (153-kilometre) circular walk which starts and finishes at the Millennium Bridge over Douglas Harbour.
- The Bayr ny Skeddan (English: Herring Road) – a 14-mile (23 km) walk between Castletown and Peel based on the route once used by Manx fishermen.
- The IOM Heritage Trail – a 10 1/2-mile (17 km) walk along disused Isle of Man Railway lines from Douglas to Peel.
