= Ballasalla =

Coordinates: 54.097°N 4.631°W

Ballasalla: Manx: Balley Sallagh
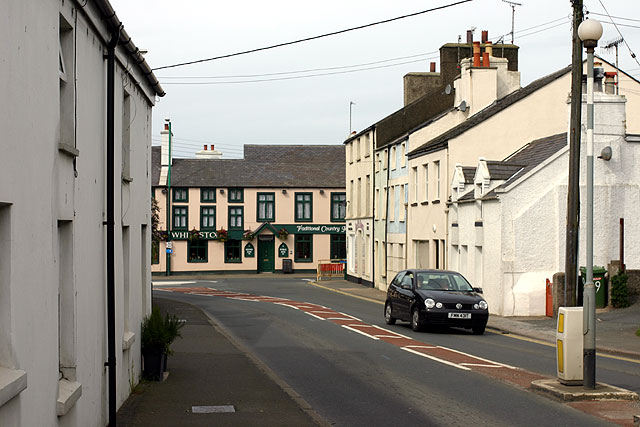
- Main Road, looking south

- Location within the Isle of Man
- OS grid reference: SC280699
- Parish: Malew
- Sheading: Rushen
- Crown dependency: Isle of Man
- Post town: ISLE OF MAN
- Postcode district: IM9
- Dialling code: 01624
- Police: Isle of Man
- Fire: Isle of Man
- Ambulance: Isle of Man
- House of Keys: Malew and Santon

Ballasalla (from Manx Balley Sallagh 'place of willows') is a village in the parish of Malew in the south-east of the Isle of Man. The village is situated close to the Isle of Man Airport and 2 miles (3 km) north-east of the town of Castletown.

== History ==
Ballasalla grew up around nearby Rushen Abbey. The abbey was originally for monks of the Congregation of Savigny, but later came under Cistercian control. The abbey was an important centre of knowledge and literacy on the Isle of Man and also of economic importance to the local area, as it was also the site of a major annual market. After the dissolution of the monasteries under King Henry VIII, the abbey was dissolved, fell into disrepair and was eventually ruined. Much of the stonework from the original abbey structures was used in the construction of new buildings in the village of Ballasalla in the following centuries.

Ballasalla was the site of a cotton mill in the late 18th century, whose ruins can still be seen today. The mill was built by Deemster Thomas Moore (1726–1794) on his estate for his business partners Abraham Delapryme (variously written de la Pryme and Dalrymple) and Francis Wheelhouse. The mill's success came to an end with the introduction of new import duties from the Isle of Man into Britain.

Pigot's Directory of the Isle of Man in 1837 described the village of Ballasalla at it was in the mid-19th century:

Ballasalla is a village of prepossing and respectable appearance, consisting of about one hundred houses; it is situate in the parish of Malew, nearly two miles north of Castletown, at the point where the Peel and Douglas roads separate. This is the largest and most English-looking village in their island; the roads in the vicinity are generally lined with neatly cut hedge-rows; and the country around being well sheltered with wood, and varied by gently-swelling eminences, the prospects, though not very extensive, are pleasing.

For much of the history of Ballasalla, the community was primarily based around agriculture. Many residents of the village now commute daily to Castletown or Douglas, or work at the nearby industrial estate at Balthane. Local businesses include Athol Garage, sellers of motor vehicles, and Pooil Vaaish, dealing in slate, marble and monumental masonry.

The aviation industry has become an important source of employment for the village and the surrounding communities. The headquarters of Citywing, the Isle of Man airline, was at Hangar 9 at Isle of Man Airport near Ballasalla. The former Manx Airlines also had its head office at the airport.

== Local government and representation ==
The lowest-level local authority is Malew Parish Commissioners who are based in Ballasalla. There are currently five commissioners. The day-to-day activities of the authority are run by the clerk, Mr Barry Powell. The commissioners' offices are located on the main road of the village close to the Whitestone Inn.

== Education ==
The village has its own primary school, Ballasalla School. After year six pupils generally attend Castle Rushen High School in Castletown.

== Transport ==
=== Roads ===
The A5 Douglas to Port Erin road runs through the village and this is the main route from Douglas to the south of the island.

=== Buses ===
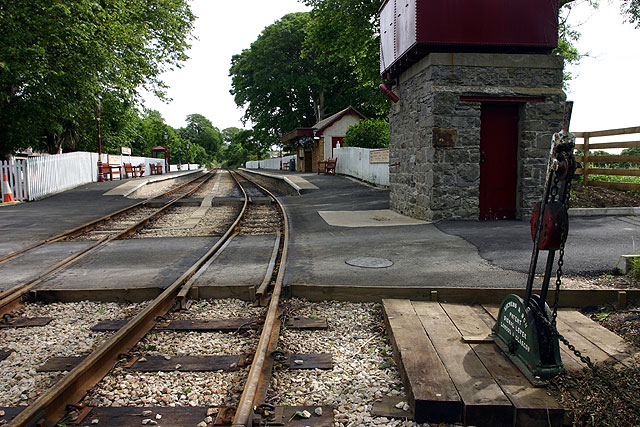
Railway Station

There are three buses an hour to Onchan, Douglas, Castletown, Port St Mary and Port Erin operated by Bus Vannin. There are also infrequent buses to Foxdale and Peel.

=== Railway ===
Ballasalla railway station, on the Isle of Man Railway, is on the eastern side of the village, and the railway operates seasonally between March and November. The station used to have its own cattle dock and goods sidings, seeing intensive use in the early to middle 20th century, but these were lost to office developments in 1985 when the station building was relocated. The Isle of Man Airport is at Ronaldsway just south of the village and also has a small request stop on the railway, a short distance from the terminal. Arriving air passengers sometimes catch trains for the novelty value of travelling by steam train.

== Churches ==
=== Church of England ===
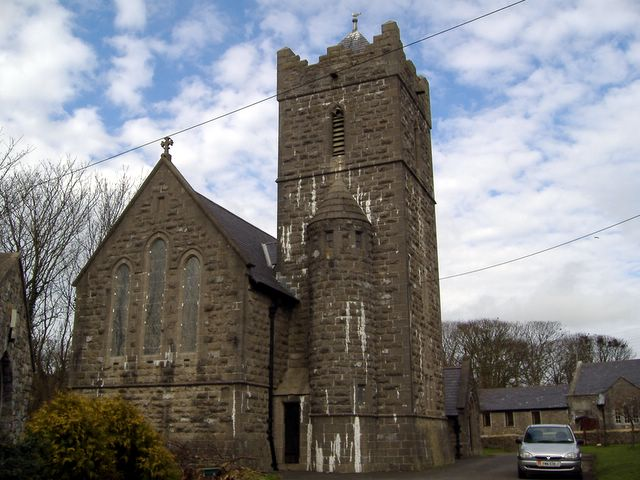
The Abbey Church

St Mark's Church is in St Mark's Road, some distance from the village. The foundation stone was laid in 1771 and it was consecrated in 1772 by the then Bishop of Sodor and Man, Mark Hildesley. It was intended to serve as a chapel of ease and a parish school more conveniently located for those from the outlying hill district than Kirk Malew Church. There was an ancient church near the site which is said to have been dedicated to St Mark.

St Mary the Virgin, Abbey Church was built from local limestone sourced from Scarlett Point south of Castletown, with the foundation stone being laid in 1895 by Lady Ridgeway, the wife of the then Lieutenant Governor of the Isle of Man, Sir Joseph West Ridgeway. The church was consecrated in 1896 and remains in regular use today, with its own substantial church hall within its grounds. Both churches are Church of England in the Diocese of Sodor and Man.

=== Methodist ===
Ballasalla has had three Methodist chapels in the past. The original Ballafesson Wesleyan Methodist Chapel dates from about 1798. It was restructured in 1846, although the original roof slate is still intact. It is now a scout hall. Ballasalla (Bridge Road) Primitive Methodist Chapel was built in 1833. It closed as a chapel in 1949, but continued to be used as a Sunday school until 1975. It was sold in 1980 and the seats, pulpit and choir pews were moved to Ballafesson Wesleyan Methodist Chapel. A second Wesleyan Methodist chapel was built in the village in 1893. It closed in 1980 and was demolished in 1981 as the building was unsafe.

== Amenities and events ==
The village has a pub, various shops, and a post office. A modern office development, Portland Court, occupies the former railway goods yard. This was sold off in 1985 for redevelopment, and the new station lies on the opposite side of the tracks.

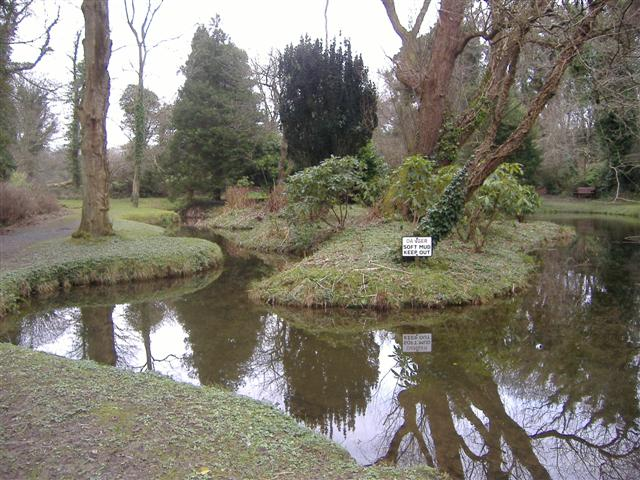
Silverdale Glen

Ballasalla is the site of the mediaeval Monks' Bridge over the Silverburn river, which leads to the Manx National Heritage site of Rushen Abbey. This forms part of the Story Of Mann set of attractions established in 1989 and now part of an island-wide series of attractions. The abbey was extensively redeveloped as a heritage site in 1996 and again as an interactive museum in 2000.

Also near the village is the Silverdale Glen, set amongst woodland. The recreation site consists of a small boating lake, café, sprawling playing fields and playground including a Victorian water-powered carousel. A wooded footpath alongside the Silverburn river runs between Rushen Abbey, the Monks' Bridge, and Silverdale Glen.

In a small hamlet above the village the eponymous St Mark's Fair is held annually on the third Saturday in July.

The Millennium Way long distance footpath, opened in 1979, which begins at Castle Rushen and heads north towards Ramsey, runs through the village alongside the banks of the river, leading to Poulsom Park in Castletown to the south, and to St. Mark's above the village to the north.

== Sport ==
Malew football club play their home games at the Malew Football Ground, Clagh Vane and Ronaldsway play their home games at the Ronaldsway Aircraft Factory Fields. Both clubs compete in the Isle of Man Football League.

== Residents' association ==
The village has an active residents' association, Ballasalla and District Residents Association (BADRA).

Since 2010, the village has had a Community Partnership set up with the involvement of the Isle of Man Government, outside agencies and local residents, with Graham Cregeen, a former Member of the House of Keys (MHK) for Arbory, Castletown & Malew, as Chairman.

== Notable people ==
- Sarah Kerruish, documentary filmmaker
- Edmund Lowey (1938–2024), politician
- John Quine (1857–1940), clergyman, scholar and writer
- Felix Ready (1872–1940), British Army officer
- Becky Storrie (born 1998), cyclist
- Norman Wisdom (4 February 1915 – 4 October 2010), British actor, was a resident of the village
