= Embury Beacon =

Iron Age fort in North Devon, England

Coordinates: 51.006°N 4.511°W

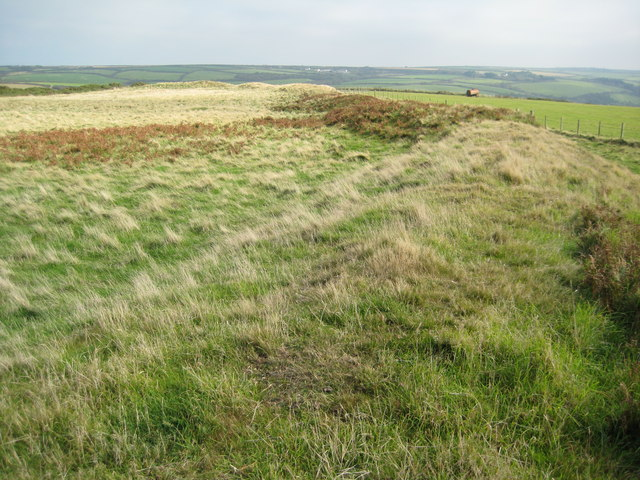
Embury Beacon

Embury Beacon is the site of an Iron Age promontory fort on the west of the Hartland Peninsula, north of Bude and west of Clovelly, in north Devon. The fort has almost entirely been lost to coastal erosion, but a fraction of the eastern ramparts still exist at approximately 150 metres (490 ft) above Sea Level. It is part of the National Trust property of Bideford Bay and Hartland, which also includes two other hill forts at Windbury Head and Bucks Mills earthworks. The site's name suggests it was the location of a beacon, possibly during the Elizabethan period, but there is no archaeological evidence of this.

== Description ==
The fort consists of two earthwork ramparts which create a triangular enclosed area with cliffs on its north and west sides. The earthworks were built on a summit and the surviving inland slopes both descend towards the south. At the time of construction, the area around the site would have been a mix of woodland and open landscape with heath and grassland.

The outer ramparts are a maximum of 190 metres (620 ft) in length and 1.5 metres (4.9 ft) high. Where the outer ditch survives unaffected by ploughing it is 0.9 metres (3.0 ft) deep. As measured from the bottom of the ditch, the outer rampart is 2.8 metres (9.2 ft) tall. An entrance gap splits the outer ramparts into a western and eastern section. It is highly unlikely that the two sections were ever connected. The western end of the rampart, formed of a bank and external ditch, is the longest surviving section of the rampart. A gap in this section is believed to date from the medieval period, possibly having been made to allow access to the enclosure for grazing sheep. The eastern rampart, formed of a linear north-south bank and external ditch, is less uniform than its western counterpart, which may be the result of weathering or a change in the layout of the earthworks during the Iron Age. The outer enclosure is an average of 50.5 metres (166 ft) wide and featureless except for a low, linear bank 20 metres (66 ft) long and 0.6 metres (2.0 ft) high.

The inner rampart has a maximum length of 30 metres (98 ft) and height of 2.2 metres (7.2 ft), and only survives on the cliff edge. Its v-shaped ditch is 3.3 metres (11 ft) deep and 7 metres (23 ft) wide. Flints found within and between the ramparts have been dated to the late Neolithic or early Bronze Age.

The fort has a 6m wide entrance at the north eastern end of the site which is enclosed by an outwork rampart. This outwork consists of a rampart 2.6 metres (8.5 ft) high with an associated ditch 0.3 metres (0.98 ft) deep which has been damaged by ploughing. The outwork would have provided a barrier preventing easy access to the entrance. Construction of the outwork around the entrance may have taken place during the late Iron Age, and the ditch is believed to have been infilled during the mid to late Roman period.

A possible circular feature in the north east of the site has been suggested to be a barrow. This possible barrow is a mound 25 metres (82 ft) long, 20 metres (66 ft) wide and 0.85 metres (2.8 ft) high. It has been suggested as the location of a beacon, however excavations in 1973 interpreted the mound as being part of a rampart and ditch.

The remains of the earthworks suggest that Embury Beacon was once a much larger hill fort. Much of the fort's ramparts have been lost to coastal erosion over thousands of years, meaning that little is known of the original size and shape of the enclosed area. Only a small section of the inner enclosure and part of the outer ramparts still survives. Historical maps and aerial photography show little more than what survives today. It is estimated that only one quarter of the site is left, the rest having been lost to coastal erosion. The north west cliff face is believed to have receded by a maximum of 200 metres (660 ft) in the last ninety years, based on evidence from historical maps. Since the 1970s excavations the final surviving parts of the inner enclosure have been lost. In July 1995 most of the area within the inner rampart was lost.

At the time the fort was built there may not have been an outcrop on the cliffs, and the coast may have experienced such a large degree of erosion that this site may once have been a headland large enough to accommodate a large multiple enclosure fort. Based on this, it has been suggested that the site may not represent a promontory fort, but that it is instead a contour fort.

== Excavations ==
In 1972-3 the site was partially excavated by the Department of the Environment in response to the threat of erosion, and much of the areas excavated at that time have now been lost. These excavations did not include a complete section of the outer rampart or ditch, and did not examine the entrance area. Excavation of the enclosure found only a low fragment of wall footings, suggesting that the site was used for enclosing livestock rather than as a settlement. However, postholes found in the interior of the site suggested the presence of structures, and findings of pottery, slingstones, spindle whorls, and whetstones in the area enclosed by the inner rampart suggest a domestic function. Some of the pottery has been identified as Late Iron Age Glastonbary Ware.

In 1997 The Royal Commission on the Historical Monuments of England conducted a large scale survey of Embury Beacon on behalf of the National Trust. This report suggested that the fort's location means its role may have been maritime, possibly involving signalling, as well as defensive. It may have been used, or later reused, as a signal station giving rise to its name.

Further excavations were carried out in 2012, including a magnetometry survey which found no clear evidence of internal occupation of the fort. These excavations examined the potential barrow, finding that although it had been heavily affected by ploughing, it retains a core 0.6 metres (2.0 ft) deep. Large, well spaced stones were found within, as well as a cremated deposit (which had been disturbed) and residual Bronze Age pottery. Although few pottery fragments were found, they have been dated to the early Bronze Age between 2000 and 1500 BC. Beach pebbles found throughout the site have been interpreted as slingstones, and the 2012 excavations found 40 potential slingstones: 22 in the entrance, 17 in the ditch, and 1 between the ramparts.

A 3D model of the site has been created using aerial photographs taken by drone.
