= Rushen Abbey =

Monastery on the Isle of Man, United Kingdom

Coordinates: 54°05′56″N 4°38′15″W

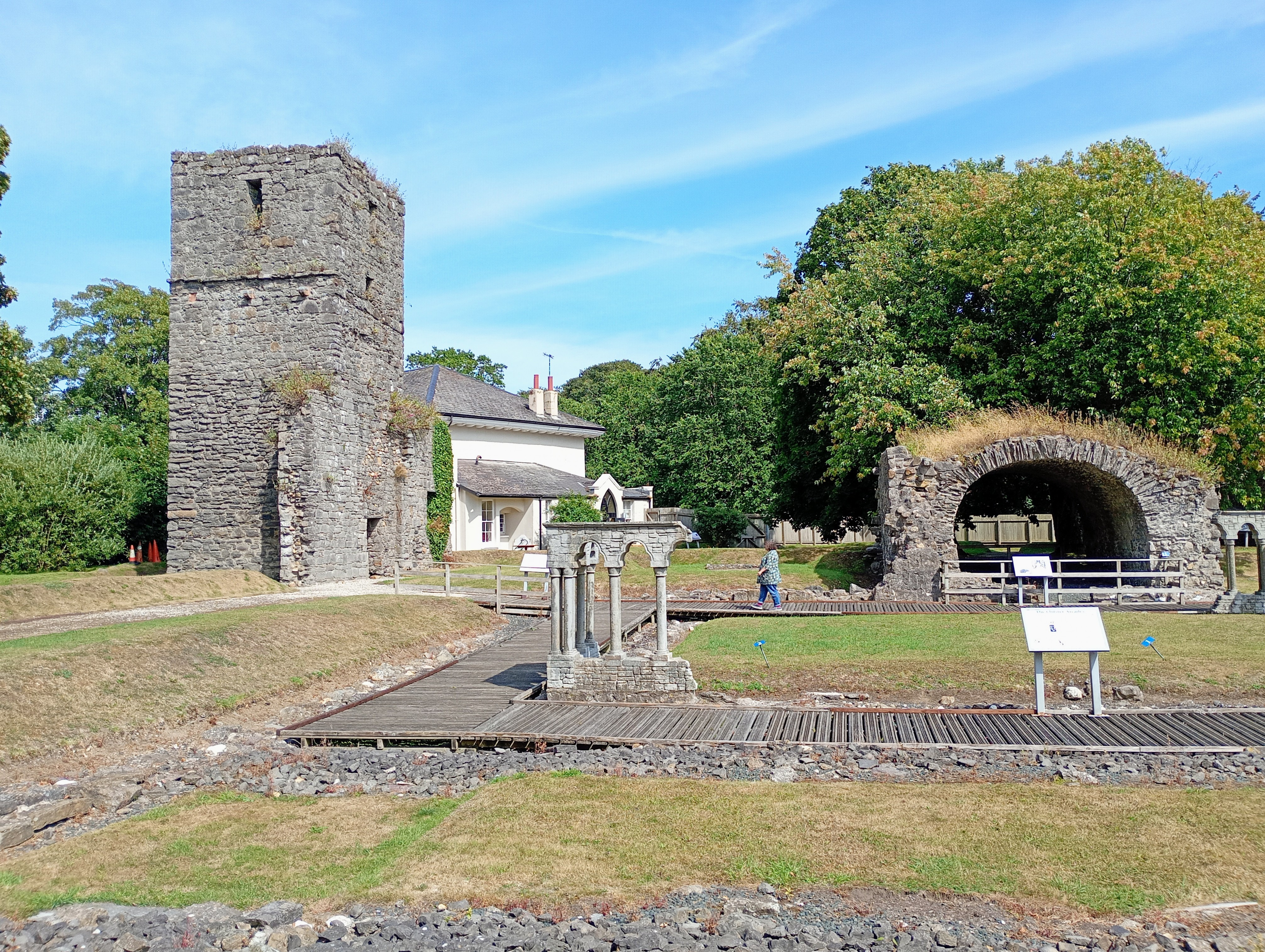
- Some of the remains

Religion
- Affiliation: Cistercian (dissolved in the 16th century)
- District: 13Ŀ
- Ecclesiastical or organisational status: museum
- Year consecrated: 1134

Location
- Location: Ballasalla, Isle of Man
- Interactive map of Rushen Abbey

Architecture
- Type: Abbey
- Completed: 1257
- Materials: stone

Rushen Abbey is a former abbey on the Isle of Man, located in Ballasalla. Originally home for monks of the Savignac order, it soon came under Cistercian control and remained so until its dissolution. The abbey is located two miles (three kilometres) from Castle Rushen, the politically most important site on the island in medieval times. Both these sites are on the Awin Rosien, a river now called the Silver Burn in English.

== History ==
The abbey was founded in 1134, under Óláfr Guðrøðarson's control. He granted the land to Savignac monks from Furness Abbey. In 1147 the abbey came under Cistercian rule following the merging of the Savignac and Cistercian orders. The abbey church dedicated to St Mary was completed in 1257. The abbey was dissolved in the 16th century.

In 1853 the Isle of Man Government bought Rushen Abbey with the intention of turning it into a lunatic asylum, but it was never used for such a purpose, and in 1864 an Act was passed revoking the sale.

In the early 1900s, the abbey ruins became a popular tourist destination, famous for the strawberries and cream served in its gardens. After falling into disrepair after World War II, the abbey was acquired by Manx National Heritage in May 1998, and restorations have now been made. Soon afterwards, excavations began, and archaeologists discovered more about the monks' way of life and practices.

The abbey is now a heritage centre (part of the "Story of Mann") with a building containing artefacts and telling the history of Rushen Abbey and the surrounding area. The remains of the original abbey have been restored and walkways constructed to allow visitors to get a close look. Between April and October the abbey is open to the public and an admission fee is payable. Before accessing the abbey gardens, visitors must walk through a museum that explains the role of the abbey. There is interactive, audio and video material available. At the end of the exhibition, there is an area designed for children, allowing them to build an arch and discover the monastery's history in a way that is more appealing to them. The centre is advertised to children with the phrase "Monky business".

The Chronicle of Mann was compiled at Rushen Abbey, as were many other important documents relating to the island. The abbey is significant in this respect, as it would have been the centre of knowledge and literacy on the island.

== Monks' Bridge ==
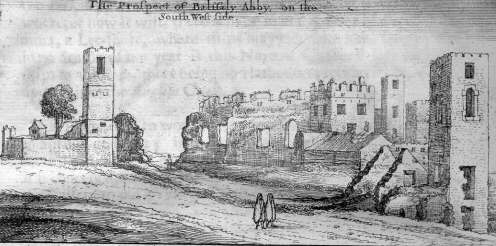
A drawing of the Abbey ruins from 1656

Monks from Rushen Abbey would sometimes have farms in the north of the island. A packhorse bridge was built in around 1350 to allow the monks to cross the nearby Silverburn River. Known today as The Monks' Bridge (or The Crossag), it is one of few surviving packhorse bridges in the British Isles.

== Burials ==
- Olaf the Black
- Magnús Óláfsson
- Rǫgnvaldr Óláfsson
