= Manx National Heritage =

National heritage organisation of the Isle of Man

- Founded: 1951
- Purpose: Heritage
- Region served: Isle of Man
- Key people: Connie Lovel, Executive Director
- Website: Manx National Heritage

Manx National Heritage (Manx: Eiraght Ashoonagh Vannin) is the national heritage organisation for the Isle of Man. The organisation manages a significant proportion of the Island’s physical heritage assets including over 2326.5 acres of coastline and landscape. It holds property, archives, artwork, library and museum collections in trust for the Manx nation. It is the Isle of Man's statutory heritage agency and an Isle of Man registered charity (№ 603).

== Overview ==
Manx National Heritage is a charitable trust, and a registered charity created by statute as (and still formally known as) the Manx Museum and National Trust. It is governed by a board of trustees.

Manx National Heritage's role is to lead the Isle of Man's community in recognising, understanding, valuing and promoting its cultural heritage and identity to a worldwide audience.

It is a designated body of the Isle of Man Government, linked via the Department of Economic Development. The Isle of Man Government provide funding for the trust's core activities and some capital projects

Manx National Heritage operates the Isle of Man's National Museum and Art Gallery, National Monuments Service, and the National Library and Archive.

== Museums ==
Manx National Heritage operates the following museums:

- Castle Rushen, Castletown
- Cregneash Folk Village, Cregneash
- Grove Museum, Ramsey
- House of Manannan, Peel
- The Great Laxey Wheel & Mines Trail, Laxey Wheel, Laxey
- Manx Museum, Douglas
- The Nautical Museum, Castletown
- The Old Grammar School, Castletown
- The Old House of Keys, Castletown
- Peel Castle, Peel
- Rushen Abbey, Ballasalla
- Sound Centre, Calf Sound, near Cregneash
- Niarbyl, Dalby Niarbyl

== Site and field monuments ==
The following monuments are under the protection of Manx National Heritage:

- Balladoole
- The Braaid
- Cashtal yn Ard
- Cronk ny Merriu
- The Manx Stone Cross Collection
- Meayll Hill
- St Michael's Isle

== Natural heritage assets ==
The following properties are under the protection of Manx National Heritage:

- The Ayres
- The Curraghs
- Eary Cushlin & Creggan Mooar
- The Dhoon and Bulgham Brooghs
- Killabrega
- Land seaward of the Marine Drive
- Lower Silverdale
- Maughold Head & Brooghs and Gob ny Rona
- Niarbyl
- The Sound and the Calf of Man
- Upper Ballaharry

== Notable people ==
- Katie King, curator of art and social history since 2021
