= Promontory fort =

Fortification, usually dating from the Iron Age

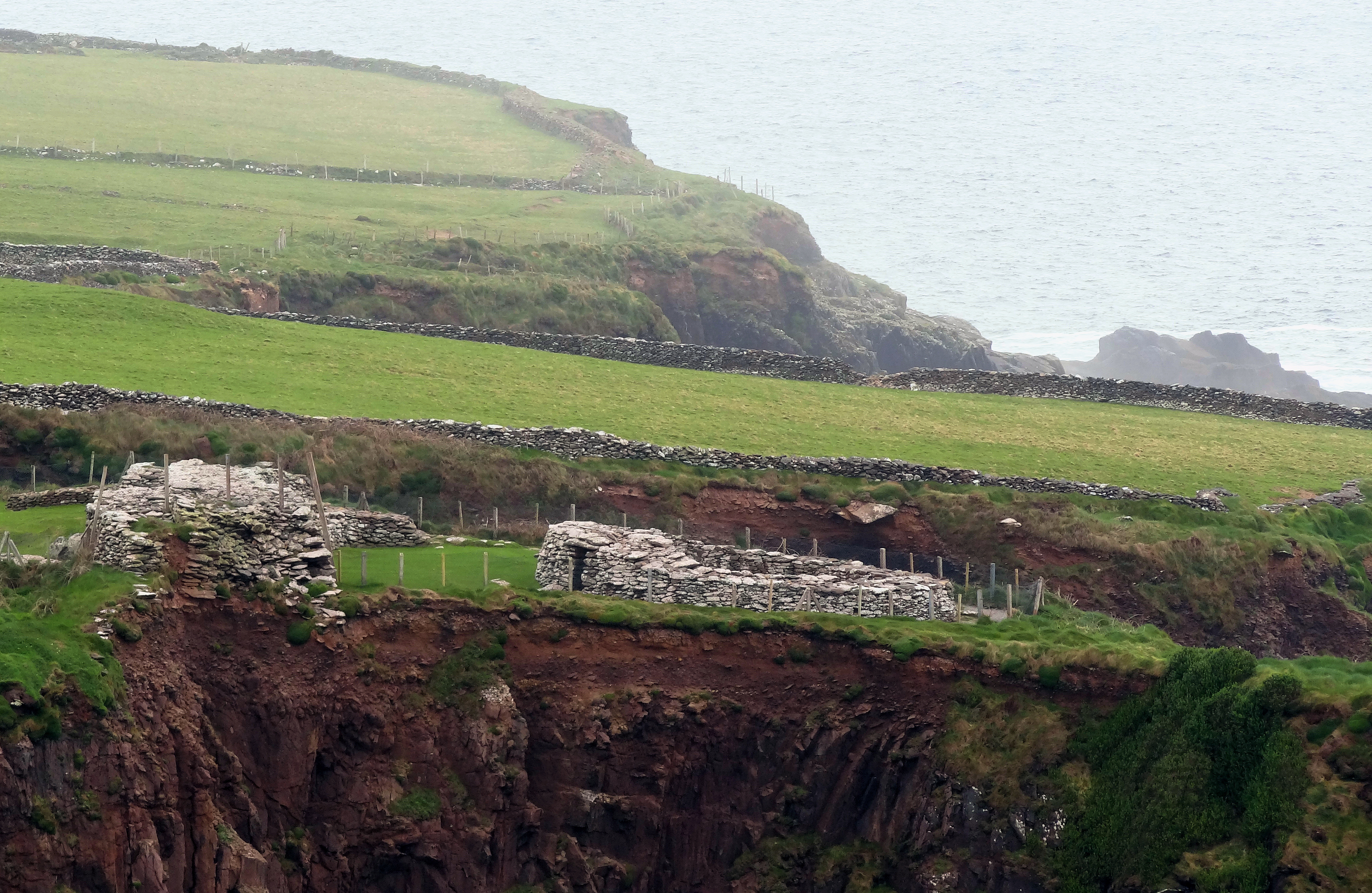
Dunbeg Fort, a promontory fort below Mount Eagle, Dingle Peninsula, County Kerry, Ireland

A promontory fort is a defensive structure located above a steep cliff, often only connected to the mainland by a small neck of land, thus using the topography to reduce the ramparts needed.

The oldest known promontory fort is Amnya I in Siberia which was established as a fortified site in the late 7th millennium BC. Although their dating is problematic, most seem to date to the Iron Age. They are mainly found in Ireland, Brittany, the Orkney Islands, the Isle of Man, Devon, the Channel Islands and Cornwall.

== Ireland ==
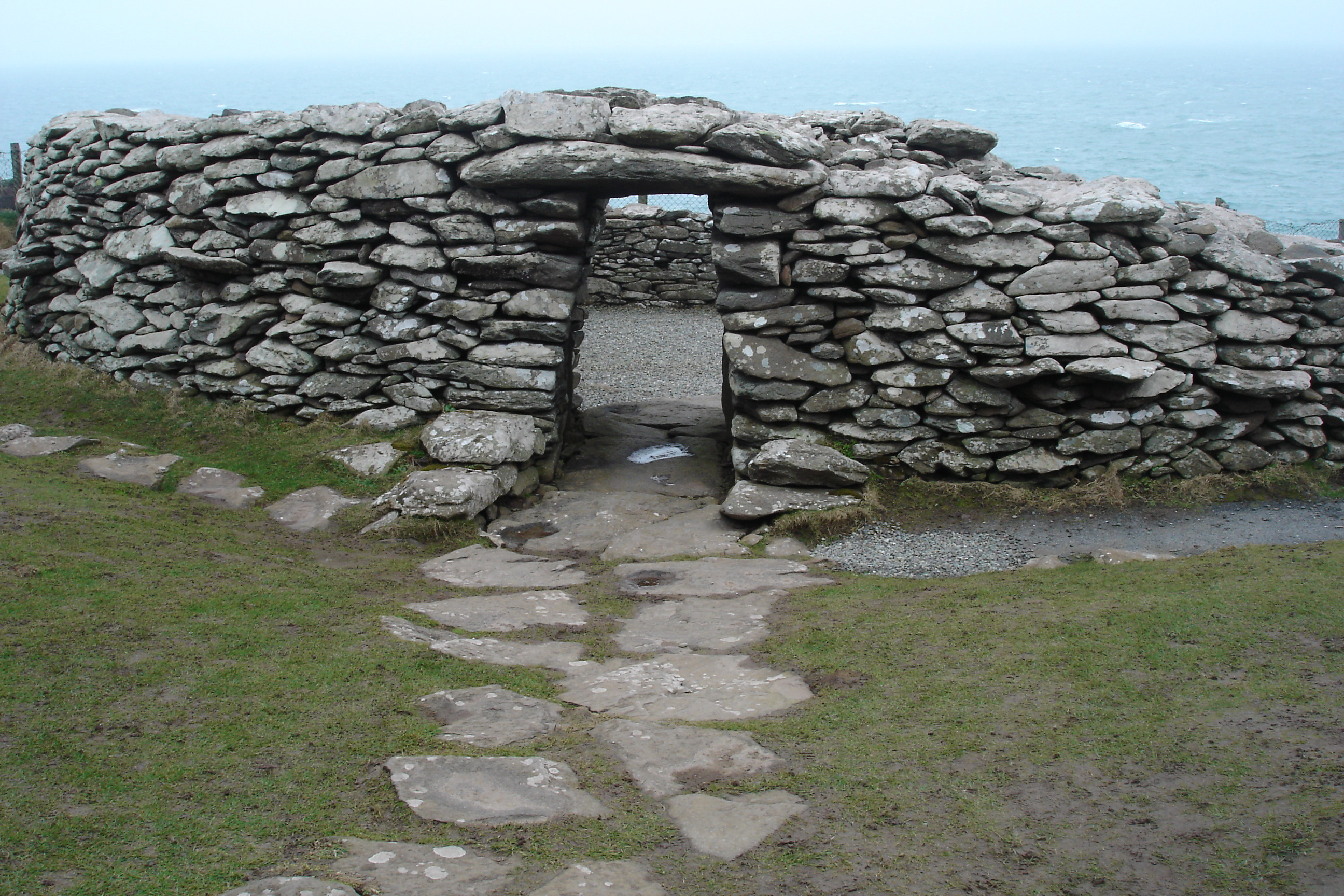
Entrance to Dunbeg Fort

Only a few Irish promontory forts have been excavated and most date to the Iron Age, though some, like Dunbeg Fort (County Kerry) might have originated in the Bronze Age. Others, like Dalkey Island (County Dublin) contain imported Eastern Mediterranean pottery and have been reoccupied and changed in the early medieval period. Some, like Doonmore (near Dingle, County Kerry) are associated with the Middle Ages. Dunbeg contains an early medieval corbelled stone hut (clochán).

== Isle of Man ==
On the Isle of Man, promontory forts are found particularly on the rocky slate headlands of the south. Four out of more than twenty have been excavated and several, especially in Santon, can be visited using the Raad ny Foillan coastal footpath. All have a rampart on their vulnerable landward side, and excavations at Cronk ny Merriu have shown that access to the fort was via a strongly built gate.

The Scandinavians who arrived in Mann in the eighth and ninth centuries AD sometimes re-used these Iron Age promontory forts, often obliterating the old domestic quarters with their characteristic rectangular houses; the fine example at Cronk ny Merriu has been used as the basis of the reconstruction in the House of Manannan museum in Peel.

== Devon and Cornwall ==
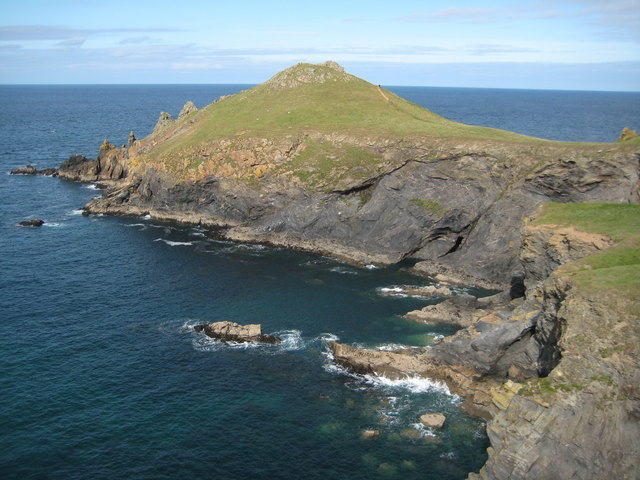
The Rumps in North Cornwall

Cornish promontory forts can be found all along the coast of Penwith. Maen Castle, near to Land's End is one of the oldest, having been dated to around 500 BC. They are also found in other districts, e.g. The Rumps near Padstow and Dodman Point on the southern Cornish coast as well as Rame Head close to Plymouth. In Devon, Burgh Island and Bolt Tail are located on the south coast and Embury Beacon and Hillsborough on the north coast. The famous site at Tintagel may be a rare example of promontory fort whose occupation continued into the post Roman and from there into later periods.

== Brittany ==
Caesar's Commentarii de bello Gallico describes the Veneti in southern Armorica – a powerful sea-faring people allied with the southern British during the war of 56 BC – as living in clifftop oppida. Their capital was Darioritum, on the Gulf of Morbihan, now modern Vannes/Gwened. The Veneti had close trade ties with southwestern Britain. When they were attacked by the Romans in Brittany, Julius Caesar reports that Cornwall sent them military aid.

== Channel Islands ==
There are a few examples of promontory forts on the Island of Jersey, which includes Le Pinacle, Le Câtel de Rozel, and Le Câtel de Lecq. All of these were located on headlands on the north and north-east of the Island, given the strong natural defences that exist on those parts of the Island. Remains of an Iron Age fort were located on the site of Mont Orgueil Castle to the east of the island as well as materials from the Neolithic and Bronze Age.

== See also ==
- Hillfort – Fortified refuge or defended settlement on a rise of elevation
- Pā – Village or fortified settlement in Māori culture, many of which were situated on peninsulas or promontories
- Promontory – Prominent mass of land that overlooks lower-lying land or a body of water
