= List of association football teams in lower divisions to have won three or more trophies in one season =

This is a list of association football clubs playing outside the top tier of their national league system that have won three or more trophies in a single season.

In association football, clubs in lower divisions typically compete in a league competition as well as domestic cup tournaments, and in some cases regional or secondary national competitions. While winning a double or treble is considered a significant achievement, accomplishing this feat outside the top division is comparatively rare due to limited resources and squad depth.

For the purposes of this list, a "lower division" refers to any level below the top tier of a national league system.

The terms treble, quadruple, and quintuple are used to describe clubs winning three, four, or five trophies respectively within a single season.

== Trebles in lower divisions ==
In many countries, knock-out competitions exclusive to clubs outside the top division(s) also exist. This gives lower ranked clubs a chance to win a treble. Examples include:

=== Men ===
Club	Country	Number won	Season(s) won	Titles won	Refs.
Canberra Croatia	Australia	9	1962, 1995, 2004, 2007, 2009, 2010, 2011, 2018	NPL Capital Football Premiership, NPL Capital Football Grand Final, Federation Cup	
Canberra Croatia	Australia	9	1977	ACT Division Two Premiership, ACT Division Two Grand Final, ACT Club Championship	
South Hobart	Australia	8	1919, 1921, 1946, 1948	Tasmanian Soccer Championship, Southern Premier League, Falkinder Cup	
South Hobart	Australia	8	2008, 2010, 2011	Tasmanian Soccer Championship, Southern Premier League, Milan Lakoseljac Cup	
South Hobart	Australia	8	2014	NPL Tasmania Premiership, NPL Tasmania Grand Final, Milan Lakoseljac Cup	
Perth Azzurri	Australia	6	1971, 1981	WA State League, D’Orsogna Cup, Night Series	
Perth Azzurri	Australia	6	1990, 2001	Top Four Cup, D’Orsogna Cup, Night Series	
Perth Azzurri	Australia	6	1993	WA Division One, Top Four Cup, D’Orsogna Cup	
Perth Azzurri	Australia	6	2002	WA Premier League, Top Four Cup, Night Series	
Cashmere Technical	New Zealand	6	2013, 2014	South Island Football Championship, Mainland Premier League, Chatham Cup	
Cashmere Technical	New Zealand	6	2015, 2018, 2020	South Island Football Championship, Mainland Premier League, English Cup	
Cashmere Technical	New Zealand	6	2021	Southern League, Chatham Cup, English Cup	
Sandy Bay	Australia	5	1925, 1927, 1933, 1936, 1939	Tasmanian Soccer Championship, Southern Premier League, Falkinder Cup	
Southport Warriors	Australia	5	1990	FQP League 3 (South Coast) Premiership, FQP League 3 (South Coast) Grand Final, BLK Pre-season Cup	
Southport Warriors	Australia	5	1992	FQP League 4 (South Coast) Premiership, FQP League 4 (South Coast) Grand Final, President's Cup	
Southport Warriors	Australia	5	1987, 1989, 1996	FQP League 3 (South Coast) Premiership, FQP League 3 (South Coast) Grand Final, President's Cup	
Lions FC	Australia	4	2002, 2003	Brisbane Premier League Premiership, Brisbane Premier League Grand Final, Brisbane Premier Cup	
Lions FC	Australia	4	2004	Brisbane Premier League Premiership, Brisbane Premier League Grand Final, Queensland State Cup	
Lions FC	Australia	4	2024	NPL Queensland Grand Final, Kappa Pro Series, Kappa Queensland Cup	
Western	New Zealand	3	1936, 1945, 1955	Hurley Shield, Chatham Cup, English Cup	
Broadbeach United	Australia	3	1976, 1991, 1995	FQP League 3 (South Coast) Premiership, FQP League 3 (South Coast) Grand Final, President's Cup	
Stirling Macedonia	Australia	3	1994, 1995	WA Division One, Top Four Cup, Night Series	
Stirling Macedonia	Australia	3	1996	D’Orsogna Cup Top Four Cup, Night Series	
Bayswater City	Australia	3	2013, 2014	NPL Western Australia Premiership, D’Orsogna Cup, Night Series	
Bayswater City	Australia	3	2017	NPL Western Australia Premiership, Top Four Cup, Night Series	
Cascades	Australia	2	1932, 1934	Tasmanian Soccer Championship, Southern Premier League, Falkinder Cup	
Gungahlin United	Australia	2	1965, 1968	ACT Division One Premiership, ACT Division One Grand Final, Federation Cup	
Olympia Warriors	Australia	2	1966, 1967	Tasmanian Soccer Championship, Southern Premier League, Falkinder Cup	
Glenorchy Knights	Australia	2	1970, 2005	Tasmanian Soccer Championship, Southern Premier League, Milan Lakoseljac Cup	
Hobart Zebras	Australia	2	1971, 1983	Tasmanian Soccer Championship, Southern Premier League, Milan Lakoseljac Cup	
Floreat Athena	Australia	2	1988	WA Super League, Top Four Cup, D’Orsogna Cup	
Floreat Athena	Australia	2	1997	WA Premier League, D’Orsogna Cup, Night Series	
Belconnen United	Australia	2	1990, 1998	NPL Capital Football Premiership, NPL Capital Football Grand Final, Federation Cup	
Christchurch United	New Zealand	2	1991	New Zealand National Soccer League, Chatham Cup, English Cup	
Christchurch United	New Zealand	2	2023	Southern League, Chatham Cup, English Cup	
Caernarfon Town	Wales	2	2000-01	Cymru Alliance, Cymru Alliance League Cup, NWCFA Challenge Cup	
Caernarfon Town	Wales	2	2012-13	Welsh Alliance League Division One, FAW Trophy, Cookson Cup	
Adelaide City	Australia	2	2006	FFSA Super League, Federation Cup, Errea Cup	
Adelaide City	Australia	2	2022	NPL South Australia Premiership, NPL South Australia Grand Final, Federation Cup	
Limavady United	Northern Ireland	2	2016-17	NIFL Premier Intermediate League, Irish Intermediate Cup, Craig Memorial Cup	
Limavady United	Northern Ireland	2	2023-24	NIFL Premier Intermediate League, North West Cup, Craig Memorial Cup	
Sunnyside	New Zealand	1	1926	Hurley Shield, Chatham Cup, English Cup	
Brantwood	Northern Ireland	1	1951-52	Irish Intermediate League, Irish Intermediate Cup, Steel & Sons Cup	
Bala Town	Wales	1	1958-59	Cambrian Coast Football League, Cambrian Coast League Cup, Mid Wales Cup	
Ballyclare Comrades	Northern Ireland	1	1960-61	Irish League B Division, Irish Intermediate Cup, Steel & Sons Cup	
Hakoah Sydney City East	Australia	1	1968	NSW First Division Premiership, NSW First Division Grand Final, Australia Cup	
Larne	Northern Ireland	1	1969-70	Irish League B Division, Irish Intermediate Cup, Steel & Sons Cup	
Monaro Panthers	Australia	1	1977	ACT Division One Premiership, ACT Division One Grand Final, Federation Cup	
Manurewa	New Zealand	1	1978	Northern League, Chatham Cup, Charity Cup	
Cockburn City	Australia	1	1982	WA State League, Top Four Cup, Night Series	
Wealdstone	England	1	1984-85	Alliance Premier League, FA Trophy, Middlesex Senior Cup	
New Town Eagles	Australia	1	1989	Tasmanian Soccer Championship, Southern Premier League, Milan Lakoseljac Cup	
Bonnyrigg White Eagles	Australia	1	1992	NSW Super League Premiership, NSW Super League Grand Final, Waratah Cup	
Barry Town United	Wales	1	1993-94	Welsh Football League Division One, FAW Trophy, Welsh League Cup	
Bankstown City	Australia	1	1994	NSW Super League Premiership, NSW Super League Grand Final, Waratah Cup	
Adelaide Blue Eagles	Australia	1	1995	SASF Premier League Minor Premiership, SASF Premier League Grand Final, Federation Cup	
Dundela	Northern Ireland	1	1999-00	Irish League Second Division, Irish Intermediate Cup, Steel & Sons Cup	
Loughgall	Northern Ireland	1	2003-04	Irish First Division, Bob Radcliffe Cup, Mid-Ulster Cup	
North Eastern MetroStars	Australia	1	2004	SASF Premier League Minor Premiership, SASF Premier League Grand Final, Federation Cup	
Selangor	Malaysia	1	2005	Liga Premier, Malaysia FA Cup, Malaysia Cup	
Spezia	Italy	1	2011-12	Lega Pro Prima Divisione, Coppa Italia Lega Pro, Supercoppa di Serie C	
Ferrymead Bays	New Zealand	1	2012	South Island Football Championship, Mainland Premier League, English Cup	
Carrick Rangers	Northern Ireland	1	2014-15	NIFL Championship, Irish Intermediate Cup, Steel & Sons Cup	
Canberra Olympic	Australia	1	2016	NPL Capital Football Premiership, NPL Capital Football Grand Final, Federation Cup	
Sydney United 58	Australia	1	2016	NPL New South Wales Premiership, National Premier Leagues, Waratah Cup	
Heidelberg United	Australia	1	2017	NPL Victoria Premiership, National Premier Leagues, Dockerty Cup	
Campbelltown City	Australia	1	2018	NPL South Australia Premiership, NPL South Australia Grand Final, National Premier Leagues	
Gold Coast Knights	Australia	1	2023	NPL Queensland Premiership, NPL Queensland Grand Final, Kappa Pro Series	
Wellington Olympic	New Zealand	1	2024	Central League, Chatham Cup, Charity Cup	

=== Women ===
Club	Country	Number won	Season(s) won	Titles won	Refs.
Belconnen United	Australia	7	2011, 2014, 2015, 2016, 2017, 2018, 2019	ACT Women's Premier League Premiership, ACT Women’s Premier League Grand Final, ACT Women's Federation Cup	
Lions FC	Australia	2	2021, 2022	Women's NPL Queensland Premiership, Women's NPL Queensland Grand Final, Kappa Women's Super Cup	
Southport Warriors	Australia	1	1990	Women’s FQP League 3 (South Coast) Premiership, Women’s FQP League 3 (South Coast) Grand Final, Women's President's Cup	
Glenfield Rovers	New Zealand	1	2011	NRFL Premiership, NRFL Premiership Cup, Kate Sheppard Cup	
The Gap FC	Australia	1	2014	South East Queensland Premier League Premiership, South East Queensland Premier League Grand Final, Elaine Watson Cup	
Broadbeach United	Australia	1	2021	Brisbane Women's Premier League Premiership Brisbane Women's Premier League Grand Final, Elaine Watson Cup	
Coastal Spirit	New Zealand	1	2022	South Island Championship, Mainland Women's Premier League, Reta Fitzpatrick Cup	
Canberra Olympic	Australia	1	2024	ACT Women's Premier League Premiership, ACT Women’s Premier League Grand Final, ACT Women's Charity Shield	
Cashmere Technical	New Zealand	1	2024	South Island League, South Island Qualifying League, Reta Fitzpatrick Cup	

== Minor Trebles ==
=== Lower Treble ===
Clubs that have won three significant competitions in a single season: the top-tier domestic league, the primary domestic cup, and a secondary or third-tier continental competition.

==== Men ====
Club	Country	Confederation	Number won	Season	Titles
Dynamo Kyiv	Soviet Union	UEFA	2	1974-75, 1985–86	Soviet Top League, Soviet Cup, UEFA Cup Winners' Cup
Porto	Portugal	UEFA	2	2002-03, 2010–11	Primeira Liga, Taça de Portugal, UEFA Cup
Barcelona	Spain	UEFA	1	1958-59	La Liga, Copa de Generalísimo, Inter-Cities Fairs Cup
IFK Göteborg	Sweden	UEFA	1	1981-82	Allsvenskan, Svenska Cupen, UEFA Cup
Al Ahly	Egypt	CAF	1	1984-85	Egyptian Premier League, Egypt Cup, African Cup Winners' Cup
Gor Mahia	Kenya	CAF	1	1987	Kenyan Premier League, Moi Golden Cup, African Cup Winners' Cup
Espérance de Tunis	Tunisia	CAF	1	1998-99	Tunisian Ligue Professionnelle 1, Tunisian Cup, African Cup Winners' Cup
Galatasaray	Turkey	UEFA	1	1999-00	Süper Lig, Turkish Cup, UEFA Cup
CSKA Moscow	Russia	UEFA	1	2004-05	Russian Premier League, Russian Cup, UEFA Cup
Dordoi	Kyrgyzstan	AFC	1	2006	Kyrgyz Premier League, Kyrgyzstan Cup, AFC President's Cup
Al-Muharraq	Bahrain	AFC	1	2008-09	Bahraini Premier League, King's Cup, AFC Champions League Two
Central Coast Mariners	Australia	AFC	1	2023-24	A-League Premiership, A-League Grand Final, AFC Champions League Two
Arkadag	Turkmenistan	AFC	1	2024-25	Ýokary Liga, Turkmenistan Cup, AFC Challenge League

=== Cup Treble ===
Clubs that have won three significant competitions in a single season: the primary domestic cup, a secondary domestic cup, and a continental competition.

==== Men ====
Club	Country	Confederation	Number won	Season	Titles
Liverpool	England	UEFA	1	2000-01	FA Cup, EFL Cup, UEFA Cup

=== Alternative Treble ===
Clubs that have won three significant competitions in a single season: the top-tier domestic league, a secondary domestic cup, and a continental competition.

==== Men ====
Club	Country	Confederation	Number won	Season	Titles
Liverpool	England	UEFA	1	1983-84	English Football League, Football League Cup, European Cup
Al-Ittihad	Saudi Arabia	AFC	1	1998–99	Saudi Pro League, Saudi Federation Cup, Asian Cup Winners' Cup
Bayern Munich	Germany	UEFA	1	2000-01	Bundesliga, DFB-Ligapokal, UEFA Champions League
Mamelodi Sundowns	South Africa	CAF	1	2015-16	South African Premiership, Telkom Knockout, CAF Champions League

== Four titles in lower divisions ==
Clubs in lower divisions that have won four competitions in a single season. This has sometimes been called a 'quadruple'.

=== Men ===
Club	Country	Confederation	Number won	Season	Titles won
Canberra Croatia	Australia	OFC	10	1962	NPL Capital Football Premiership, NPL Capital Football Grand Final, Federation Cup, Robertson Cup
Canberra Croatia	Australia	OFC	10	1986	NPL Capital Football Premiership, Federation Cup, ACT Club Championship, Croatia Cup
Canberra Croatia	Australia	OFC	10	1987, 1988	NPL Capital Football Premiership, NPL Capital Football Grand Final, ACT Ampol Cup, ACT Club Championship
Canberra Croatia	Australia	OFC	10	1995, 2004, 2011	NPL Capital Football Premiership, NPL Capital Football Grand Final, Federation Cup, ACT Club Championship
Canberra Croatia	Australia	OFC	10	2005	NPL Capital Football Premiership, NPL Capital Football Grand Final, ACT Club Championship, Croatia Cup
Canberra Croatia	Australia	OFC	10	2016, 2018	NPL Capital Football Premiership, NPL Capital Football Grand Final, Federation Cup, ACT Charity Shield
Cashmere Technical	New Zealand	OFC	4	2013, 2014	South Island Football Championship, Mainland Premier League, Chatham Cup, McFarlane Cup
Cashmere Technical	New Zealand	OFC	4	2018	Southern Football Championship, Mainland Premier League, English Cup, McFarlane Cup
Cashmere Technical	New Zealand	OFC	4	2020	South Island Football Championship, Mainland Premier League, McFarlane Cup, Hurley Shield
South Hobart	Australia	AFC	2	1946	Tasmanian Soccer Championship, Southern Premier League, Milan Lakoseljac Cup, Falkinder Cup
South Hobart	Australia	AFC	2	2008	Tasmanian Soccer Championship, Southern Premier League, Milan Lakoseljac Cup, Steve Hudson Cup
Olympia Warriors	Australia	AFC	2	1966, 1967	Tasmanian Soccer Championship, Southern Premier League, Falkinder Cup, Association Cup
Olympia Warriors	Australia	AFC	2	1984	Tasmanian Soccer Championship, Southern Premier League, Summer Cup, Cadbury Trophy
Southport Warriors	Australia	OFC	2	1987, 1996	FQP League 3 (South Coast) Premiership, FQP League 3 (South Coast) Grand Final, President's Cup, BLK Pre-season Cup
Cascades	Australia	AFC	1	1934	Tasmanian Soccer Championship, Southern Premier League, Falkinder Cup, Milan Lakoseljac Cup
Clyde	Scotland	UEFA	1	1951-52	Scottish Football League Division B, B Division Supplementary Cup, Glasgow Cup, Glasgow Merchants Charity Cup
Larne	Northern Ireland	UEFA	1	1958-59	Irish Intermediate Cup, Steel & Sons Cup, George Wilson Cup, Louis Moore Cup
Ballyclare Comrades	Northern Ireland	UEFA	1	1960-61	Irish League B Division, Irish Intermediate Cup, Steel & Sons Cup, George Wilson Cup
APIA Leichhardt	Australia	OFC	1	1966	NSW First Division Premiership, NSW Ampol Cup, Waratah Cup, Australia Cup
Hakoah Sydney City East	Australia	OFC	1	1968	NSW First Division Premiership, NSW First Division Grand Final, Australia Cup, NSW Ampol Cup
Hobart Zebras	Australia	AFC	1	1971	Tasmanian Soccer Championship, Southern Premier League, Milan Lakoseljac Cup, Summer Cup
Bonnyrigg White Eagles	Australia	OFC	1	1992	NSW Super League Premiership, NSW First Division Grand Final, Waratah Cup, Karadjordje Cup
Barry Town United	Wales	UEFA	1	1993-94	Welsh Football League Division One, Welsh Cup, FAW Trophy, Welsh League Cup
Al-Arabi SC	Kuwait	AFC	1	1999-00	Kuwaiti Division One, Kuwait Emir Cup, Kuwait Crown Prince Cup, Kuwait Federation Cup
Broadbeach United	Australia	OFC	1	1995	FQPL 3 - South Coast Premiership, FQPL 3 - South Coast Grand Final, President's Cup, BLK Pre-season Cup

=== Women ===
Club	Country	Confederation	Number won	Season(s) won	Titles won
Coastal Spirit	New Zealand	OFC	2	2017, 2021	Mainland Women's Premier League, Reta Fitzpatrick Cup, McFarlane Cup, Hawkey Shield
Cashmere Technical	New Zealand	OFC	1	2024	South Island League, South Island Qualifying League, Reta Fitzpatrick Cup, McFarlane Cup

== Five titles in lower divisions ==
Clubs in lower divisions that have won five competitions in a single season. This has sometimes been called a 'quintuple'.

=== Men ===
Club	Country	Confederation	Number won	Season	Titles won
Cashmere Technical	New Zealand	OFC	2	2015	South Island Football Championship, Mainland Premier League, English Cup, Hurley Shield, McFarlane Cup
Cashmere Technical	New Zealand	OFC	2	2021	Southern League, Mainland Premier League, Chatham Cup, English Cup, McFarlane Cup
Loughgall	Northern Ireland	UEFA	1	2007-08	Irish First Division, Irish Intermediate Cup, Carnegie League Cup, Bob Radcliffe Cup, Mid-Ulster Cup

=== Women ===
Club	Country	Confederation	Number won	Season(s) won	Titles won
Coastal Spirit	New Zealand	OFC	1	2022	South Island Championship, Mainland Women's Premier League, Reta Fitzpatrick Cup, Hawkey Shield, McFarlane Cup

== Unaffiliated combinations ==
Clubs in non-FIFA countries that have won four or more competitions in a single season.

=== Men ===
Club	Country	Confederation	Number won	Season	Titles won	Refs.
St. Georges	Isle of Man	IIGA	6	2004-05, 2013–14	Isle of Man Football League, Isle of Man FA Cup, Isle of Man Railway Cup, Charity Shield	
St. Georges	Isle of Man	IIGA	6	2010-11, 2012–13, 2015–16	Isle of Man Football League, Isle of Man Hospital Cup, Isle of Man Railway Cup, Charity Shield	
St. Georges	Isle of Man	IIGA	6	2016-17	Isle of Man Football League, Isle of Man FA Cup, Isle of Man Hospital Cup, Isle of Man Railway Cup	
Vale Recreation	Guernsey	IIGA	5	1972-73	Priaulx League, Stranger Charity Cup, Frederick Martinez Cup, Le Vallee Cup	
Vale Recreation	Guernsey	IIGA	5	1973-74	Priaulx League, Jeremie Cup, Stranger Charity Cup, Frederick Martinez Cup,	
Vale Recreation	Guernsey	IIGA	5	1975-76, 1976–77	Priaulx League, Upton Park Trophy, Stranger Charity Cup, Le Vallee Cup	
Vale Recreation	Guernsey	IIGA	5	1983-84	Priaulx League, Stranger Charity Cup, Frederick Martinez Cup, Le Vallee Cup	
Nadur Youngsters	Gozo	IIGA	4	1994-95	GFL First Division, Independence Cup, G.F.A. Cup, Air Malta Cup	
Nadur Youngsters	Gozo	IIGA	4	1995-96	GFL First Division, Independence Cup, G.F.A. Cup, GFA Super Cup	
Nadur Youngsters	Gozo	IIGA	4	2002-03	GFL First Division, GFA Super Cup, Freedom Day Cup, Noel Vasallo Cup	
Nadur Youngsters	Gozo	IIGA	4	2006-07, 2012–13	GFL First Division, Independence Cup, GFA Super Cup, Freedom Day Cup	
Northerners	Guernsey	IIGA	3	1926-27, 1927–28	Priaulx League, Upton Park Trophy, Frederick Martinez Cup, Stranger Charity Cup	
Northerners	Guernsey	IIGA	3	2015-16	Priaulx League, Guernsey FA Cup, Frederick Martinez cup, Rawlinson Cup	
Sylvans	Guernsey	IIGA	3	1994-95	Priaulx League, Frederick Martinez cup, Stranger Charity Cup, Berkley Cup	
Sylvans	Guernsey	IIGA	3	1996-97, 1997–98	Priaulx League, Upton Park Trophy, Frederick Martinez cup, Stranger Charity Cup	
Peel	Isle of Man	IIGA	2	1932-33, 1972–73	Isle of Man Football League, Isle of Man FA Cup, Isle of Man Hospital Cup, Isle of Man Railway Cup	
Sannat Lions	Gozo	IIGA	2	1977-78	GFL First Division, G.F.A. Cup, Farsons Tournament, Republic Cup	
Sannat Lions	Gozo	IIGA	2	1978-79	G.F.A. Cup, Jum il-Ħelsien Cup, Farsons Tournament, Republic Cup,	
St. Paul's	Jersey	CONIFA	2	1987-88	Jersey Football Combination, Upton Park Trophy, Le Riche Cup, Charity Cup	
St. Paul's	Jersey	CONIFA	2	2016-17	Jersey Football Combination, Upton Park Trophy, W.E. Guiton Memorial Trophy, Le Riche Cup	
St. Martins	Guernsey	IIGA	1	1966-67	Priaulx League, Upton Park Trophy, Frederick Martinez cup, Stranger Charity Cup	
Gymnasium	Isle of Man	IIGA	1	1986-87	Isle of Man Football League, Isle of Man FA Cup, Isle of Man Hospital Cup, Isle of Man Railway Cup	
Jersey Wanderers	Jersey	CONIFA	1	1989-90	Jersey Football Combination, Upton Park Trophy, Le Riche Cup, Lady Bingham Trophy	
Çetinkaya	Northern Cyprus	CONIFA	1	1996-97	Birinci Lig, Cypriot Cup, KTFF Presidential Cup, Dr. Fazıl Küçük Cup	
St. Marys	Isle of Man	IIGA	1	1997-98	Isle of Man Football League, Isle of Man FA Cup, Isle of Man Hospital Cup, Isle of Man Railway Cup	
Victoria Hotspurs	Gozo	IIGA	1	2009-10	GFL First Division, Independence Cup, GFA Super Cup, Freedom Day Cup	

=== Men ===
Club	Country	Confederation	Number won	Season	Titles won	Refs.
Vale Recreation	Guernsey	IIGA	3	1974-75	Priaulx League, Upton Park Trophy, Jeremie Cup, Stranger Charity Cup, Le Vallee Cup	
Vale Recreation	Guernsey	IIGA	3	1982-83	Priaulx League, Jeremie Cup, Stranger Charity Cup, Frederick Martinez Cup, Le Vallee Cup	
Vale Recreation	Guernsey	IIGA	3	1988-89	Priaulx League, Upton Park Trophy, Jeremie Cup, Frederick Martinez Cup, Le Vallee Cup	
St. Georges	Isle of Man	IIGA	3	2007-08, 2011–12, 2014–15	Isle of Man Football League, Isle of Man FA Cup, Isle of Man Hospital Cup, Isle of Man Railway Cup, Charity Shield	
First Tower United	Jersey	CONIFA	2	1972-73	Jersey Football League, Upton Park Trophy, Charity Cup, Lady Bingham Trophy, Touzel Cup	
First Tower United	Jersey	CONIFA	2	1977-78	Jersey Football Combination, Upton Park Trophy, Le Riche Cup, W.E. Guiton Memorial Trophy, Charity Cup, Lady Bingham Trophy	
St. Paul's	Jersey	CONIFA	2	2014-15	Jersey Football Combination, Upton Park Trophy, W.E. Guiton Memorial Trophy, Le Riche Cup, Charity Cup	
St. Paul's	Jersey	CONIFA	2	2015-16	Jersey Football Combination, Upton Park Trophy, Le Riche Cup, Wheway Cup, Charity Cup	
St. Peter	Jersey	CONIFA	1	2001-02	Jersey Football Combination, Upton Park Trophy, Le Riche Cup, Charity Cup, Wheway Cup	
Laxey	Isle of Man	IIGA	1	2006-07	Isle of Man Football League, Isle of Man FA Cup, Isle of Man Hospital Cup, Isle of Man Railway Cup, Charity Shield	
Xewkija Tigers	Gozo	IIGA	1	2011-12	GFL First Division, G.F.A. Cup, Independence Cup, GFA Super Cup, Freedom Day Cup	
Jersey Scottish	Jersey	CONIFA	1	2013-14	Jersey Football Combination, Upton Park Trophy, Le Riche Cup, Charity Cup, Wheway Cup	

=== Men ===
Club	Country	Confederation	Number won	Season	Titles won	Refs.
Vale Recreation	Guernsey	IIGA	1	1981-82	Priaulx League, Upton Park Trophy, Jeremie Cup, Stranger Charity Cup, Frederick Martinez Cup, Le Vallee Cup	

== See also ==
- Treble (association football)
- Double (association football)
- List of association football teams to have won four or more trophies in one season
