= Isle of Man Division 2 =

Second division of the Isle of Man Football League

The Isle of Man Division 2 is the second division of the Isle of Man Football League and the second highest in the Isle of Man Football League System. The winners and the runners-up of division 2 get promoted to the Isle of Man Premier League, with the two bottom football clubs from the Premier League relegated to division 2. The league is overseen by the Isle of Man Football Association.

Division 2 clubs are eligible of competing in the Isle of Man FA Cup and Hospital Cup. The second division also holds its own cup competitions, these are the Woods Memorial Cup and the Gold Cup.

== Current members ==
The following 12 clubs are competing in Division 2 during the 2023-24 season.

- Castletown
- Colby
- Douglas and District
- Foxdale
- Governors Athletic
- Gymnasium
- Malew
- Michael United
- Onchan
- Ramsey Youth Centre and Old Boys
- Douglas High School Old Boys A.F.C.
- Pulrose United

== See also ==
- List of association football competitions
- Football in the Isle of Man
- Isle of Man Football League
