= Isle of Man football league system =

The Isle of Man football league system comprises two connected leagues for football clubs in the Isle of Man, the Premier League and Division Two. The system has a hierarchical format with promotion and relegation between the two leagues. There are currently 25 clubs who are members of a league in the Isle of Man men's football league system, split into two divisions, one of 12 clubs and one of 13 clubs.

The league system for women's football in Isle of Man runs separately. There is currently only one league comprising six clubs.

== Cup eligibility ==
Being members of a league at a particular level affects eligibility for Cup, or single-elimination, competitions.

- Isle of Man FA Cup: Levels 1 and 2
- Isle of Man Hospital Cup: Levels 1 and 2
- Isle of Man Railway Cup: Level 1 only
- Paul Henry Gold Cup: Level 2 only
- Captain George Woods Memorial Cup: Level 2 only

== The system ==
Level	League(s)/Division(s)
1	Isle of Man Premier League (Canada Life Premier League) 12 clubs – 2 relegations
2	Isle of Man Division Two (JCK Division Two) 13 clubs – 2 promotions

== Women's system ==
The women's system currently has one step. The league comprises six clubs and there is no promotion or relegation.

Level	League(s)/Division(s)
1	Isle of Man Women's League (Regency Travel Women's League) 6 clubs – no promotion or relegation

== See also ==
- League system, for a list of similar systems in other countries
- Football in the Isle of Man
- Isle of Man Football Association
- Isle of Man Football League
