= Isle of Man Charity Shield =

The Isle of Man Charity Shield, also known as the Eric Fletcher Charity Shield for sponsorship reasons, is an association football competition in the Isle of Man. It is overseen by the Isle of Man Football Association and is a match held at the start of the domestic season between the winners of the Isle of Man Premier League and the Isle of Man FA Cup. If the winners of both competitions are held by the same club, they will play the runners-up of the FA Cup.

In 2018, Corinthians beat St George's 4-1 to win the shield.
