= 2018–19 Isle of Man Football League =

Isle of Man Football League
- Season: 2018–19

The 2018–19 Isle of Man League was the 110th season of the Isle of Man Football League on the Isle of Man. St Georges were the defending champions, having won the previous three championships.

== Promotion and relegation following the 2017–18 season ==
=== From the Premier League ===
Relegated to Division 2

- Ramsey
- Colby

=== From Division Two ===
Promoted to the Premier League

- Marown
- Castletown Metropolitan

== Premier League ==
Location of the clubs in the 2017–18 Isle of Man Premier League

=== Teams ===
| Team | Location | Stadium | Capacity |
|---|---|---|---|
| Braddan | Douglas | Cronkbourne Football Ground | |
| Castletown Metropolitan | Castletown | Castletown Football Stadium | |
| Corinthians | Douglas | Ballafletcher Sports Ground | |
| Douglas Athletic | Douglas | Groves Road | |
| Douglas HSOB | Onchan | Blackberry Lane | |
| Douglas Royal | Douglas | Ballafletcher Sports Ground | |
| Laxey | Laxey | Laxey Football Ground | 1,000 |
| Marown | Crosby | Memorial Playing Fields | |
| Peel | Peel | Peel A.F.C Football Ground | |
| Rushen United | Port Erin | Croit Lowey | 1,500 |
| St Georges | Douglas | The Campsite | |
| St Johns United | St John's | St John's Football Ground | |
| St Marys | Douglas | The Bowl | 3,000 |

=== League table ===
| Pos | Team | Pld | W | D | L | GF | GA | GD | Pts | Promotion or relegation |
|---|---|---|---|---|---|---|---|---|---|---|
| 1 | St Marys (C) | 22 | 19 | 2 | 1 | 109 | 19 | +90 | 59 | |
| 2 | St Georges | 22 | 16 | 4 | 2 | 97 | 28 | +69 | 52 | |
| 3 | Peel | 22 | 16 | 2 | 4 | 90 | 38 | +52 | 50 | |
| 4 | Corinthians | 22 | 13 | 5 | 4 | 95 | 37 | +58 | 44 | |
| 5 | Rushen United | 22 | 13 | 3 | 6 | 73 | 32 | +41 | 42 | |
| 6 | Douglas Athletic | 22 | 9 | 3 | 10 | 51 | 73 | −22 | 30 | |
| 7 | Douglas HSOB | 22 | 9 | 2 | 11 | 59 | 56 | +3 | 29 | |
| 8 | Marown | 22 | 6 | 1 | 15 | 38 | 87 | −49 | 19 | |
| 9 | Laxey | 22 | 5 | 0 | 17 | 46 | 96 | −50 | 15 | |
| 10 | Castletown Metropolitan | 22 | 5 | 0 | 17 | 32 | 114 | −82 | 15 | |
| 11 | Douglas Royal | 22 | 4 | 2 | 16 | 37 | 107 | −70 | 14 | |
| 12 | St Johns United (R) | 22 | 4 | 2 | 16 | 30 | 70 | −40 | 13 (Note: St Johns United were deducted 1 point.) | Relegation to Isle of Man Division Two |
| 13 | Braddan (R) | 0 | 0 | 0 | 0 | 0 | 0 | 0 | 0 | Resigned |

Updated to match(es) played on 30 March 2019. Source: FA Full-Time
Rules for classification: 1) Points; 2) Goal difference; 3) Number of goals scored; 4) Number of matches won; 5) Head-to-head results
(C) Champions; (R) Relegated

== Division Two ==
Location of the clubs in the 2017–18 Isle of Man Division Two

=== Teams ===
| Team | Location | Stadium | Capacity |
|---|---|---|---|
| Ayre United | Andreas | Andreas Playing Fields | |
| Colby | Colby | Station Road | |
| Douglas and District | Douglas | Nobles Park | |
| Foxdale | Foxdale | Billy Goat Park | |
| Governors Athletic | Douglas | Bemahague School 3G Pitch | |
| Gymnasium | Douglas | Tromode Park | |
| Malew | Ballasalla | Malew Football Ground | |
| Michael United | Kirk Michael | Lough Ny Magher | |
| Onchan | Onchan | Nivison Stadium | |
| Pulrose United | Douglas | Groves Road Stadium | |
| Ramsey | Ramsey | Ballacloan Stadium | 3,000 |
| Ramsey YCOB | Ramsey | Scoill Ree Gorree | |
| Union Mills | Union Mills | Garey Mooar | |

=== League table ===
| Pos | Team | Pld | W | D | L | GF | GA | GD | Pts | Promotion or relegation |
|---|---|---|---|---|---|---|---|---|---|---|
| 1 | Ramsey | 24 | 17 | 5 | 2 | 100 | 27 | +73 | 56 | Promotion to Isle of Man Premier League |
| 2 | Pulrose United | 24 | 17 | 4 | 3 | 100 | 25 | +75 | 55 | Promotion to Isle of Man Premier League |
| 3 | Ramsey YCOB | 24 | 16 | 6 | 2 | 88 | 35 | +53 | 54 | |
| 4 | Foxdale | 24 | 15 | 3 | 6 | 83 | 39 | +44 | 48 | |
| 5 | Malew | 24 | 15 | 3 | 6 | 76 | 45 | +31 | 48 | |
| 6 | Union Mills | 24 | 11 | 4 | 9 | 72 | 53 | +19 | 37 | |
| 7 | Onchan | 24 | 11 | 2 | 11 | 76 | 56 | +20 | 35 | |
| 8 | Colby | 24 | 11 | 1 | 12 | 62 | 60 | +2 | 34 | |
| 9 | Ayre United | 24 | 11 | 1 | 12 | 56 | 57 | −1 | 34 | |
| 10 | Douglas and District | 24 | 7 | 0 | 17 | 57 | 97 | −40 | 21 | |
| 11 | Gymnasium | 24 | 6 | 2 | 16 | 43 | 100 | −57 | 20 | |
| 12 | Michael United | 24 | 1 | 2 | 21 | 27 | 127 | −100 | 5 | |
| 13 | Governors Athletic | 24 | 1 | 1 | 22 | 30 | 149 | −119 | 4 | |

Updated to match(es) played on 30 March 2019. Source: FA Full-Time
Rules for classification: 1) Points; 2) Goal difference; 3) Number of goals scored; 4) Number of matches won; 5) Head-to-head results
