= Football in the Isle of Man =

- Country: Isle of Man
- Governing body: Isle of Man Football Association
- National team(s): Men's official national team Ellan Vannin football team

National competitions
- Isle of Man FA Cup; Isle of Man Hospital Cup; Isle of Man Railway Cup; Paul Henry Gold Cup; Captain George Woods Memorial Cup

Club competitions
- Isle of Man Premier League; Isle of Man Division Two

International competitions
- ConIFA World Cup; ConIFA European Cup; Island Games

Football has been played in the Isle of Man since the end of the 19th century. The national association was founded in 1890 and oversees all aspects of association football on the island. The association is responsible for organising all national cup competitions, most notably the Isle of Man FA Cup, and the management of the Isle of Man Football League.

Although, as a Crown Dependency, the Isle of Man is not a part of the United Kingdom, the local Isle of Man football association is affiliated with the English FA, and acts as a County Football Association. Due to their affiliation with the English FA, the Isle of Man are not members of FIFA or UEFA and are therefore not eligible to enter either the World Cup or European Championship. The Isle of Man therefore is limited to different forms of competition.

Since 2019 F.C. Isle of Man have competed within the English football league system, starting in the NWCFL Division One South – although due to COVID restrictions on the Isle of Man, did not take part in the 2020–21 season - their first full season was the 2021-22 season.

== League system ==
The Isle of Man Football League is the national football league for teams of the island. The league has two levels consisting of 13 teams each, the Premier League and Division Two. The league is organised by the Isle of Man Football Association but the winning team(s) cannot enter the UEFA Champions League or UEFA Europa League, due to the island's lack of membership.

== Cup competitions ==
As well as the league, there are also many domestic cups in the Isle of Man:

- Isle of Man FA Cup
- Isle of Man Hospital Cup
- Isle of Man Railway Cup (Premier League clubs only)
- Paul Henry Gold Cup (Division Two clubs only)
- Captain George Woods Memorial Cup (Division Two clubs only)

== International football ==
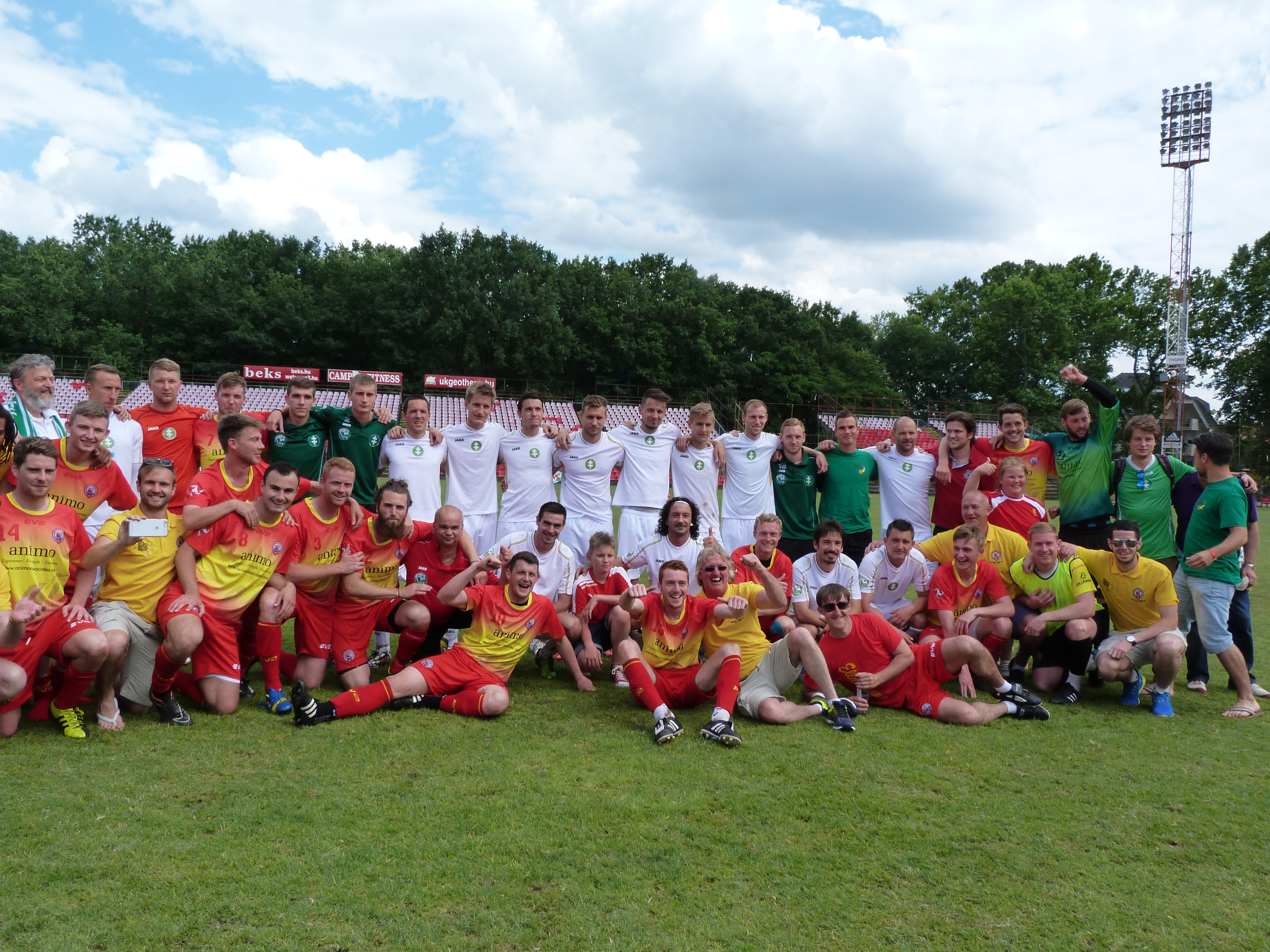
Ellan Vannin football team in Debrecen, Hungary in 2015

The Isle of Man is not a member of UEFA or FIFA so the national team cannot enter the European Football Championships qualifiers or the FIFA World Cup qualifiers. The island meets the criteria needed for membership to UEFA, but not much interest has ever been announced. As with the other Crown Dependencies, the Isle of Man Football Association has county status within The Football Association.

The Isle of Man official football team is a representative team of Isle of Man Football Association players and tends to play small-scale matches against other non-FIFA teams. They are also quite successful in the Island Games, winning silver on three occasions. The team play their home games at The Bowl in Douglas.

In 2013 an alternative national side, the Ellan Vannin football team, composed of Manx players only. The team was created to allow entry into the ConIFA World Cup.

== Football stadiums in the Isle of Man ==
Stadium	Capacity	City
King George V Bowl	3,327	Douglas

== See also ==
- Isle of Man official football team
- Isle of Man Football Association
- Isle of Man Football League
- List of football clubs in the Isle of Man
