= Women's League (Gozo) =

Association football league in Malta

- Organising body: Gozo Football Association
- Founded: 2007; 19 years ago
- Folded: 2009; 17 years ago
- Number of clubs: 4 (last edition)
- Level on pyramid: 1
- Domestic cup: Women's Cup
- Last champions: S.K. Victoria Wanderers (1st title)

The Gozitan Women's League was the highest division in Gozitan women league football that for a brief stint took place in Gozo, Malta. It was organised by the Gozo Football Association.

== History ==
The Gozitan Women's League, which was played on a seven-a-side basis, was organised during the 2007–2008 and 2008–2009 seasons. The first edition was contested by five teams whereas the second edition was contested by four teams.

== Structure ==
In the first edition, each club played each other three teams whereas during the 2008–2009 season, each club played each other four times. Three points were awarded for a win, one for a draw and zero for a loss. Being the only division in Gozitan women league football, the bottom club was not relegated.

== Clubs which participated ==
- S.K. Victoria Wanderers
- Kercem Ajax
- Xaghra United
- Nadur Youngsters
- Munxar Falcons (2007–2008 season only)

== List of winners by season ==
Season	Winner	Runners-up	Third place
2007–08	Kercem Ajax	S.K. Victoria Wanderers	Xaghra United
2008–09	S.K. Victoria Wanderers	Kercem Ajax	Xaghra United

== Wins by club ==
Club	Times
S.K. Victoria Wanderers	1
Kercem Ajax	1

== Women's Cup ==
Women's League
- Organiser(s): Gozo Football Association
- Founded: 2007; 19 years ago
- Abolished: 2009; 17 years ago
- Teams: 4 (last edition)
- Last champions: S.K. Victoria Wanderers (1st title)
- Most championships: S.K. Victoria Wanderers and Kercem Ajax (1 title each)

The Gozo Women's Cup was a football competition that took place in Gozo, Malta and that was organised by the Gozo Football Association.

This competition was contested on a knock-out basis by the clubs of the Gozitan Women's League. The first Women's Cup took place in the season 2007–2008 and the last edition was held during the subsequent season.

Kercem Ajax won the first edition whereas S.K. Victoria Wanderers won the second edition. In both instances, Xaghra United ended runners-up.
