= Isle of Man Premier League =

- Founded: 2007–present 1896–2007 (as Division One)
- Country: Isle of Man
- Number of clubs: 13
- Level on pyramid: 1
- Relegation to: Division Two
- Domestic cup: Isle of Man FA Cup
- Current champions: Corinthians (2020–21)
- Most championships: St Georges (9 titles)
- Current: 2024–25 Isle of Man Premier League

The Isle of Man Premier League (also known as the Canada Life Premier League for sponsorship reasons) is the highest division of the Isle of Man Football League and the highest overall in the Isle of Man football league system. The Premier League, which was introduced for the 2007–08 season, was previously known as the First Division. Each year, the top finishing club is crowned league champion, and the two lowest placed clubs are relegated to Division Two.

In 2018–19 season, St Marys were the division champions and St Georges were the runners-up. St Johns United and Braddan were relegated to Division Two, finishing 12th and 13th place respectively.

== History ==
The Isle of Man Premier League was introduced for the 2007–08 season.

== Structure of the league ==
=== Competition ===
The league comprises 13 clubs. Over the course of a season, which runs annually from August to the following May, a club plays each of the others in the same division twice (a double round-robin system), once at their home and once at that of their opponents. This makes for a total of 24 games played each season. Clubs gain three points for a win, one for a draw and none for a defeat. Clubs are ranked by total points, then goal difference, and then goals scored. At the end of the season, the first placed club in the league is crowned Premier League champions.

=== Promotion and relegation ===
A system of promotion and relegation exists between the Premier League and Division Two. At the end of each season the two lowest placed clubs in the Premier League are relegated to Division two, and the top two placed clubs from Division Two are promoted to the Premier League.

== Current members ==
Location of the clubs in the 2019–20 Isle of Man Premier League

The following 13 clubs are competing in the Premier League during the 2019–20 season.

Club	Finishing position last season	Location	Stadium	Capacity
Castletown Metropolitan	10th	Castletown	Castletown Football Stadium	
Corinthians	4th	Douglas	Nobles Park	
Douglas Athletic	6th	Douglas	Groves Road	
Douglas HSOB	7th	Onchan	DHSOB Football Ground	
Douglas Royal	11th	Douglas	Nobles Park	
Laxey	9th	Laxey	Laxey Football Ground	1,000
Marown	8th	Crosby	Memorial Playing Fields	
Peel	3rd	Peel	Peel A.F.C Football Ground	
Pulrose United	2nd in Division Two (Promoted)	Douglas	Groves Road Stadium	
Ramsey	1st in Division Two (Promoted)	Ramsey	Ballacloan Stadium	
Rushen United	5th	Port Erin	Croit Lowey	1,500
St Georges	2nd	Douglas	The Campsite	
St Marys	1st	Douglas	The Bowl	3,000

== Results ==
=== League champions and runners-up ===
Season	Champions	Runners-up
2007–08	Castletown 69	Peel 58
2008–09	St Georges 58	Peel 57
2009–10	Castletown 63	St Marys 58
2010–11	Castletown 68	Douglas High School Old Boys 60
2011–12	St Georges 70	Castletown 58
2012–13	Castletown 65	Laxey 52
2013–14	St Georges 70	St Marys 53
2014–15	St Georges 66	Peel 62
2015–16	St Georges 70	Peel 65
2016–17	St Georges 69	Corinthians 55
2017–18	St Georges 64	Peel 56
2018–19	St Marys 59	St Georges 52
2019–20	Cancelled due to COVID-19 pandemic.	
2020–21	Corinthians 70	Rushen United 56
2021–22	Ayre United 56	Rushen United 47

=== Relegated teams (from Premier League to Division Two) ===
Season	Clubs
2007–08	Douglas Royal (11), St Johns United (14)
2008–09	Ayre United (14), Colby (17)
2009–10	Union Mills (3), St Johns United (13)
2010–11	Douglas Royal (7), Michael United (13)
2011–12	Ayre United (3), Ramsey YCOB (11)
2012–13	Marown (7), Gymnasium (13)
2013–14	Castletown Metropolitan (8), Ramsey YCOB (9)
2014–15	Michael United (3), Gymnasium (9)
2015–16	Ramsey YCOB (5), Marown (15)
2016–17	Ayre United (-1), Union Mills (7)
2017–18	Ramsey (11), Colby (11)
2018–19	St Johns United (13), Braddan (0)
2019–20	cancelled due to COVID-19
2020–21	Douglas Athletic (15), St Johns United (12)

== Top scorers ==
Season	Top scorer	Club	Goals
2007–08	(Isle of Man) Callum Morrissey	St Georges	37
2008–09	(Isle of Man) Callum Morrissey	St Georges	30
2009–10	(Isle of Man) Steven Priestnal	St Marys	29
2010–11	(Isle of Man) Steven Priestnal	St Marys	28
2011–12	(Isle of Man) Josh Kelly	Rushen United	31
2012–13	(Isle of Man) Steven Priestnal	St Marys	37
2013–14	(Isle of Man) Ciaran McNulty	St Georges	30
2014–15	(Isle of Man) Josh Kelly	Peel	40
2015–16	(Isle of Man) Ciaran McNulty	St Georges	40
2016–17	(Isle of Man) Ashley Webster	Peel	36
2017–18	(Isle of Man) Ciaran McNulty	St Georges	45
2018–19	(Isle of Man) Sean Doyle	Corinthians	39

== See also ==
- List of association football competitions
- Isle of Man Football League
- Football in the Isle of Man
