= Foxdale A.F.C. =

Association football club on the Isle of Man

- Full name: Foxdale A.F.C.
- Nickname: The Miners
- Founded: 1991 (1992)
- Ground: Billy Goat Park
- League: Isle of Man Football League Division Two
- 2020/21: 5th
Home colours	Away colours

Foxdale A.F.C. is a football club based in Foxdale on the Isle of Man. They compete in the second tier of the Isle of Man Football League.

== History ==
In 1897, a group of rugby-playing miners turned their attention away from the game to focus on football. Foxdale Football Club recorded their first ever game against Castletown, losing the game 10–0 in 1898. A year later, during the 1899–1900 season, Foxdale entered the Isle of Man Football League. After narrowly missing out on becoming champions of the Second Division in 1900–01, Foxdale went on to only play one more season before folding at the end of the 1901–02 season.

It was not until 90 years later that Foxdale was able to place their name to a footballing side. However, they were not able to find a home within the village as Foxdale had to play and train at Jurby for the first three seasons of their establishment. Foxdale's first game came against St. Johns United on 5 September 1992 which they lost 5–2. For this game, Foxdale's kit had not arrived in time and they had to rely on the generosity of Douglas Royals; who lent Foxdale a red, away kit for the game.

After three years of ground-sharing with Jurby, Foxdale were able to move to their own ground, and current location, Billy Goat Park. The ground was purchased with funds that were raised through special events, supported by local business owners such as James Cubbon, David Crowe and a large contribution from Alan Lemaire, who went on the play for, then manage, the club.

Since being established in 1991, Foxdale have won a total of three competitions, the Paul Henry Gold Cup, which they won in the 1993–94 season after beating Marown A.F.C. 7–2. That same season they were promoted to the First Division as Division Two champions but were relegated in the 1995/96 season.

Foxdale narrowly missed out on the Woods Cup in 2000–01 after being beaten 3–0 by Ayre United A.F.C. in the final of the competition. They did, however, return the following season to win the same competition, defeating Colby 2–1 in the final.

In the 2009–10 season, Foxdale entered the Kirby Estates Cowell Cup for the first and, currently, only time. They were placed in Group 4 alongside Castletown, Colby and DHSOB. They narrowly missed out on progression to the next round. Foxdale started their inaugural game well, beating DHSOB 5–0 at Blackberry Lane. However, the next game at home was less convincing, losing 4–1. They finished on a high however, beating Colby 4–2 away, but never progressed to the next round with Castletown beating them.

Foxdale held their 20th anniversary on 5 August 2011 at the Palace Hotel. There was a dinner and a charity auction with 50% of the profit going to Wish Upon A Dream and 50% going to the football club itself. Guest speakers included: Richard Keys, Ronnie Irani and comedian Lester Crabtree. Former Scotland, Wolves and Everton F.C. striker Andy Gray was also due to attend but has had to withdraw because of a family commitment.

During the summer of 2016, Foxdale AFC were fortunate enough to be able to purchase new landcare machinery and equipment. The money was raised from fundraisers, selling previous equipment and, in part, a grant from the Isle of Man Football Association.

On 16 July 2016, The Claremont Hotel in Douglas, played host to Foxdale AFC's annual awards for the first time. The venue and night would prove a success, leading to repeat events in the following years on 20 May 2017 and 21 July 2018.

In July 2018, the club regained the Miners Cup for the first time in 21 years. The Miners Cup is a friendly competition between Foxdale A.F.C. and Laxey A.F.C. as both clubs are nicknamed "The Miners". The cup has not been contested since 1997 and Foxdale emerged the victors in a 5–0 win over Laxey at Billy Goat Park. A hat-trick from Jay Chatwood and a goal a piece from new signings Liam Parker and Andy Williamson sealed the trophy.

Foxdale made history in the 2018–19 season by fielding its first ever U18 side in the IOMFA Under 18 League. The idea to set up the side came from Scott Kermeen and was met with overwhelming support from the club, locals and players alike, attaining a total of 27 players by the start of the league season. The team's first ever game was on Wednesday 26 September 2018 at The Bowl versus Laxey A.F.C. The management team consisted of three current Foxdale first team players; Craig Lemaire, Scott Kermeen and Stephen Bettridge. The game was unfortunately lost 8-2 but a historic goal from Philip Plaatjies and a penalty conversion from Michael Sloan meant that Foxdale had something to celebrate. The team (squad #) was as follows: Barton Beaumont (1), Frank Quaye (2), William Quaye (3), Toby Gadsby (4), Tyler Cain (5), Jake Dillon (6), Alfie Quaye (7), Philip Plaatjies (8), Jack Noon (9), Joseph Spencer (10), Jason Charmer (11), Lucas Winchester (12), Walid Anwar (14) and Michael Sloan (15). The game was also a historic event as, for the first time ever in Foxdale's history, the back four was consisted of three triplets in the Quaye brothers (a suspected but non-confirmed first in Manx football also). The team's first victory came in their second game on Wednesday 10 November 2018, beating rivals Marown A.F.C. 6–1; goals from: Jason Charmer, Toby Gadsby, Colm Garrity, Philip Plaatjies, Michael Sloan and a Marown own goal.

The 2019–20 season saw unprecedented situations arise across the world with the COVID-19 pandemic. The FA were forced to 'null and void' all grassroots football including the Isle of Man's football leagues. From the beginning of March 2020 to the start of June 2020, no football was allowed to be played. However, with the Isle of Man's infection rate down to 0 for several weeks, the Isle of Man allowed the resumption of training (with social distancing rules adhered to). Once the Island had dropped social distancing rules completely, football was allowed to proceed as usual with the IOMFA announcing there would be play-offs for promotion to the Premier League. This was due to the fact that Castletown Metropolitan F.C. and Pulrose United A.F.C. (who were previously in the Premier League) had written to the FA stating their desires to be relegated for the 2020–21 season having played the 2019–20 season with only one team each. With the 2019–20 season having been written off, it was agreed that the top 6 teams would be involved in the play-offs with the top two clubs automatically making it to the semi-finals (winning the semi-final would have sealed promotion as two teams were required to be promoted). The IOMFA later changed this decision and automatically promoted Ayre United A.F.C. and St Johns United A.F.C. on current points.

The 2020–21 season was back after the COVID-19 pandemic and the Island's football resumed. John Roberts stepped down as manager and was replaced by club veteran centre-back Antony Corkill; assisted by Mark Smith and Stuart Fayle. An underwhelming season for the club saw them finish 5th in the league, missing out on the Paul Henry Gold Cup spots by 4 points. The effects of COVID still loomed over Manx football and the Woods Cup was scrapped with Foxdale playing only 2 cup games (FA Cup) in the season; a 13–4 win and a 5–1 loss against Michael United and Gymnasium, respectively. The silver lining of the season was that Foxdale's number 10, Jay Chatwood, once again won the league's top goalscorer and made club history by becoming Division 2 Player of the Season. An Island Team call-up followed soon after making Jay the first Foxdale player to be called up to the national side whilst playing in Division 2.

== League Positions ==
Season	Position	Points	Win %	GF	GA
2007–08	12	18	19.23%	36	89
2008–09	11	19	19.23%	58	99
2009–10	7	39	45.83%	54	50
2010–11	11	17	20.83%	41	80
2011–12	4	44	58.83%	76	42
2012–13	9	26	33.33%	64	73
2013–14	13	6	7.69%	28	110
2014–15	11	10	16.67%	28	94
2015–16	9	24	29.17%	52	88
2016–17	3	51	66.67%	121	49
2017–18	3	54	70.83%	102	33
2018–19	4	48	62.50%	39	16
2019–20	N/A	N/A	N/A	N/A	N/A
2020–21	5	44	58.33%	105	53

=== Cup Runs ===
==== 2016–17 ====
In the 2016–17 season, Foxdale found themselves in the FA Cup semi-finals against top flight league contenders, Peel A.F.C. They had reached this position by spectacularly beating Colby A.F.C. 3–2 at home in the final minutes of the Round of 16 with goals from Aaron Costain, Andrew Berry and Jay Chatwood. They then went on to play Douglas and District F.C. at The Bowl which they won 2–1 with goals from Charlie Harrison and Jay Chatwood once again.

The semi-final vs Peel was played on 25 March 2017 and a large crowd turned out to watch the underdogs compete against their western rivals. Foxdale battled throughout and held their own against the most successful club in Manx Football, however, a fortunate punted clearance goal from Scott Kermeen was not enough to keep Peel from winning 2–1.

Foxdale finished the season in third position meaning that they had qualified for the Paul Henry Gold Cup for the first time in five years. Unfortunately, this was short-lived and they were beaten on penalties by Onchan A.F.C. in the semi-finals.

==== 2017–18 ====
A disappointing season in terms of cup-runs, Foxdale found themselves unable to advance further than the first round of games in both the 'FP FA Cup' and the 'G H Woods Cup', losing to Premier League side Braddan A.F.C. and Division 2 challengers Marown A.F.C. respectively.

Little more success came from the 'Keystone Lawyers Hospital Cup'. Whilst they advanced into the second round by defeating Pulrose United A.F.C. 3–1 by goals from Andrew Berry, Stephen Bettridge and Kevin Pulman, it was Marown A.F.C. again who knocked Foxdale from the competition in the next round.

A successive third-place finish in the league sealed qualification for the Paul Henry Gold Cup once more. With the cup being Foxdale's last chance of silverware for the season, it was Pulrose United A.F.C. who was drawn to be played. An 11-goal thriller was ultimately Foxdale's demise with the game going into extra time and Foxdale conceding a late 6th goal to lose the game 6–5; goals from Ricky Newsham, Jay Chatwood, Andrew Berry, Charlie Harrison and Kevin Pulman.

==== 2018–19 ====
A bye in the first round of the GH Corlett Woods Cup meant that Foxdale were drawn against Malew A.F.C. in the Round of 16 on 19 January 2019. A hard-fought game at Clagh Vane saw Foxdale edge the game 1–0 with the ball dropping fortunately to Scott Kermeen inside the box who struck the ball into the bottom corner.

A disappointing game away at Colby A.F.C. saw Foxdale bomb out of the FA Cup in the first round of games.

After defeating Malew several weeks earlier, the quarter-finals of the Woods Cup saw Foxdale come up against Union Mills F.C. away from home. A game with gale-force winds and torrential rain complimented Foxdale, who were accompanied with the conditions in the first half, taking a 2–0 lead at half time with a lobbed effort from Ricky Newsham and a close-range goal from Scott Kermeen. A tricky second half saw the weather get worse but a resilient Foxdale side continued to protect their lead, with the game finishing 2–0; seeing the side into the semi-finals. The semi-finals of the Woods Cup is where Foxdale would see the end of their Woods Cup campaign against favourites, Pulrose United A.F.C. A single goal from opposing player-manager Steven Priestnal without response was enough to knock Foxdale out.

It would be an exciting season for Foxdale in the Hospital Cup. Their first game came on 6 April 2019 against Castletown in the preliminary round; a team promoted to the top division the season earlier. A first-half hat-trick from Jay Chatwood (1, & [https://www.youtube.com/watch?v=T62ckopicu8 3) saw Foxdale sitting comfortably at half-time. Unfortunately, the advantage was levelled in the second half as Castletown mounted a surprising comeback. However, as the game looked destined for extra-time, it was Antony Corkill who scored the winner from a corner with practically the last move of the game.

This saw Foxdale through to the Last-16 of the competition against another Division 1 side and local rivals, St Johns United A.F.C. This time, Foxdale were on the right side of the comeback after going into the break 1–0, a goal-a-piece from Andy Williamson and Jay Chatwood saw Foxdale win 2-1 and progress to the quarter-finals.

The quarter-finals draw was not dissimilar to the previous round which again saw Foxdale playing against a team from the division above who were also local rivals. It was Marown A.F.C. this time; with both teams fielding weakened sides, the game was a hard-fought affair with clear chances few and far between. It was Foxdale once again, however, who came out the victors and, once again, Antony Corkill was the man to score the only goal of the game, headed in from a corner kick. The 'giant-killers' were now onto the semi-finals of the Hospital Cup. The giant-killing name Foxdale had earned for themselves over the course of the season would finally come to an end when the semi-final draw saw them play against Division 1 champions St Marys A.F.C. Large portions of the game saw Foxdale hold their own against the Douglas powerhouses but goals early and late in both halves saw them crash out. With only one more cup competition available; The Paul Henry Gold Cup.

It was another disappointing year in the Paul Henry Gold Cup with the side playing eventual Division 2 champions, Ramsey A.F.C. at the national stadium, The Bowl. An early goal from Antony Corkill gave the Miners hope going in at half-time. But the Northern club were clinical in the second half and scored 3 goals in the second half to ensure their place in the final against local rivals, RYCOB.

== Colours and Badge ==
Foxdale players wear a royal blue and maroon striped home kit and the away kit is a yellow jersey with yellow shorts and socks.

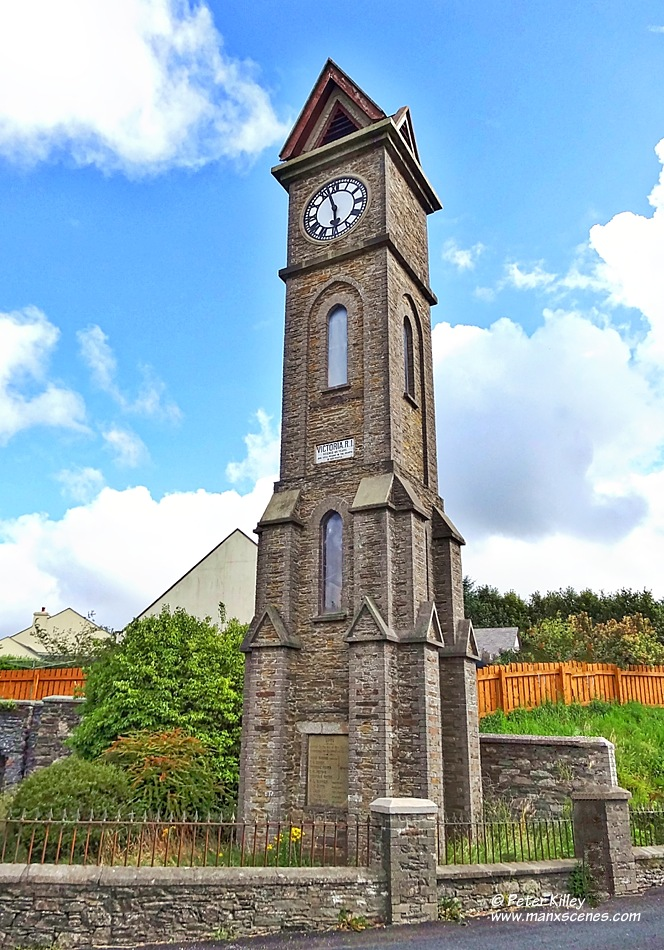

Foxdale's motto "Moyrn Y Valley Veg" is displayed in Manx underneath the emblem of the famous Foxdale Clock Tower (showed right) and can be translated into "Pride Of The Village" in English.

=== Shirt Sponsors & Makes ===
Home Kit Sponsor (First Team): Bettridge Motors

Home Kit Make (First Team): Joma

Away Kit Sponsor (All Squads): DC Skips

Away Kit Make (All Squads): Joma

Home Kit Sponsor (Combination): Mannmade Group

Home Kit Make (Combination): Joma

U18 Kit Sponsor: JCK Limited

U18 Kit Make: Lotto

== Sponsors ==
Bettridges Motors are a long and loyal sponsor to the football club and have been the first team kit sponsor for several years. The Combination kit is sponsored by Mannmade Group. The away kit is sponsored by DC Skips. Starting from the 2015/2016 season, Foxdale A.F.C. training tops and jackets have been sponsored by the Mann Made Group 'The Mann Made Group') and Bettridge Motors. JCK Limited supplied the kit for the inaugural Foxdale U18 side.

== Ground ==
Foxdale play their home games at Billy Goat Park, Stoney Mountain Road in Foxdale.

In 2004, Momentum Pictures used Billy Goat Park in some of the filming of Things to Do Before You're 30. It was released in the UK on 2 June 2006 and was directed by BAFTA Award winner, Simon Shore. The film is a remake of 1997 Dutch film All Stars and stars the likes of Billie Piper, Jimi Mistry, Dougray Scott, Emilia Fox and Shaun Parkes.

In 2011, after receiving funds from the IOMFA, Foxdale built new changing facilities designed by Mark Kinley who was also a Foxdale goalkeeper at the time. The facilities' water supply was heated by solar panels on the roof of the clubhouse. As well as new changing rooms, the club also bought new goalposts and corner flags with the funds. Two sets of goals were purchased, one full-sized set on wheels and one small training set. Money went towards attempts to set up drainage around the pitch, although this was to no avail as the boggy conditions still return after wet conditions. The volunteer work of various sponsors helped ensure that the costs were cut to a minimum with the advantage of Billy Goat Park being situated directly beside DCS Limited so machinery could be used at will. As well as the above, the money went towards a new lawnmower for the club's groundsman, and two brick huts to the right of the pitch.

May 2019 saw the erection of a new storage facility on the club's ground.

== TT Camping ==
As of the summer of 2014, Billy Goat Park will be used to accommodate campers over the period of the Isle of Man TT Races. The camping equipment was supplied by Isle of Man TT Breaks – The Lazy Camper and will accommodate around 100 tourists with members of Foxdale Football Club providing staff and services.

Since then, Foxdale have run the campsite themselves supplying tents, changing and entertainment facilities in the form of communal televisions and wifi provisions for the guests, who can catch up on the previous day's racing highlights within the marquee placed beside the changing rooms every year. From 2015, the campsite has been run and supervised by Paul and Maria Marsden.

With the cancellation of the 2019 and 2020 TT Races, the campsite was temporarily suspended until the 2022 season.

== Staff ==
- First Team Manager - Antony Corkill
- First Team Assistant Managers - Luke Stewart, Mark Smith & Stuart Fayle
- Combination Team Managers - Craig Lemaire
- President - Paul Lemaire
- Chairman - Andy McKeown
- Treasurer - Pam Lemaire
- Secretary - Scott Kermeen
- FA Representative - Alan Lemaire
- Child Welfare Officers - Pam Lemaire & Stephen Bettridge
- Committee Members -
- Fundraising Committee -
- Players Representative - Robbie Casey
- Social Secretaries - Ricky Newsham & Barton Beaumont
- Dinner Committee - Stephen Bettridge, Scott Kermeen, Craig Lemaire, Ricky Newsham & Filipe Santos
- Groundsmen - Alan Lemaire & Stephen Bettridge

== Honours ==
=== League ===
- Division Two
  - Champions 1993–94

=== Cup ===
- Paul Henry Gold Cup
  - Winners 1993–94
- Woods Cup
  - Winners 2001–02
- Miners Cup
  - Winners 1993
  - Winners 1995
  - Winners 1996
  - Winners 1997
  - Winners 2018
  - Winners 2022

=== Personal Achievements ===
- Silver Boot
  - 1992–93 - Martin Costain (29 goals)
  - 1997–98 - Martin Costain (37 goals)
  - 2017–18 - Jay Chatwood (43 goals)
  - 2020–21 - Jay Chatwood (60 goals)
- Division 2 Player of the Year
  - 2020–21 - Jay Chatwood
