= Brisbane Women's Premier League Reserves =

Brisbane Women's Premier League (BPL)
- Country: Australia
- Number of clubs: 12
- Current champions: -
- Current premiers: -
- Website: www.FootballBrisbane.com.au

Introduced in the 2016 Season, as a reserve side for the Brisbane Women's Premier League, BWPL, it operates as a part of the first tier of women's senior Football (Association Football) in Brisbane, Queensland and third overall in Australia.

== Current clubs ==
The teams for 2016 Season are shown in the table below.

Team	Home Ground	Location
Capalaba	John Frederick Park	Albany Creek
The Gap	Walton Bridge Reserve	The Gap
Peninsula Power	A.J. Kelly Park	Redcliffe
Olympic F.C.	Goodwin Park	Yeronga
Annerley	Elder Oval	Greenslopes
Mitchelton	Teralba Park	Mitchelton
Souths United	Wakerley Park	Runcorn
Pine Hills	James Drysdale Reserve	Bunya
Eastern Suburbs	Heath Park	East Brisbane
Logan Lightning	Cornubia Park	Shailer Park
UQ FC	University of Queensland	St Lucia
Toowong	Dunmore Park	Auchenflower
