= Independence Cup (Gozo) =

- Organiser(s): Gozo Football Association
- Founded: 1964; 62 years ago
- Abolished: 2013; 13 years ago
- Teams: 7 (last edition)
- Last champions: Nadur Youngsters (11th title)
- Most championships: Nadur Youngsters (11 titles)

The Independence Cup was a football competition that took place in Gozo, Malta, and that was organised by the Gozo Football Association.

This competition was played on a knock-out basis between the clubs of the First Division. The first Independence Cup took place in the season 1964–1965 — that is the same year that Malta gained its independence and the last edition was held during the 2012–2013 season. Generally the final was held on the Independence Day – that is 21 September.

== Format ==
Six teams of the First Division were chosen by lot to participate in the preliminary round. The winning three teams would join the remaining team and would participate in the semi-finals of the competition.

== Cup Winners ==
Here is a complete list of the past champions of the Independence Cup.

- 2012–2013 Nadur Youngsters
- 2011–2012 Xewkija Tigers
- 2010–2011 SK Victoria Wanderers
- 2009–2010 Victoria Hotspurs
- 2008–2009 Victoria Hotspurs
- 2007–2008 Nadur Youngsters
- 2006–2007 Nadur Youngsters
- 2005–2006 Nadur Youngsters
- 2004–2005 Nadur Youngsters
- 2003–2004 Xewkija Tigers
- 2002–2003 Ghajnsielem
- 2001–2002 Nadur Youngsters
- 2000–2001 Xewkija Tigers
- 1999–2000 Żebbuġ Rovers
- 1998–1999 Sannat Lions
- 1997–1998 Victoria Hotspurs
- 1996–1997 Sannat Lions
- 1995–1996 Nadur Youngsters
- 1994–1995 Nadur Youngsters
- 1993–1994 Nadur Youngsters
- 1992–1993 Xewkija Tigers
- 1991–1992 Xagħra United
- 1990–1991 Xagħra United
- 1989–1990 Nadur Youngsters
- 1988–1989 Xagħra United
- 1987–1988 Ghajnsielem
- 1986–1987 was not held
- 1985–1986 was not held
- 1984–1985 was not held
- 1983–1984 was not held
- 1982–1983 was not held
- 1981–1982 was not held
- 1980–1981 was not held
- 1979–1980 was not held
- 1978–1979 was not held
- 1977–1978 was not held
- 1976–1977 was not held
- 1975–1976 was not held
- 1974–1975 was not held
- 1973–1974 was not held
- 1972–1973 was not held
- 1971–1972 Ghajnsielem
- 1970–1971 Ghajnsielem
- 1969–1970 Ghajnsielem
- 1968–1969 was not held
- 1967–1968 Nadur Youngsters
- 1966–1967 was not held
- 1965–1966 Ghajnsielem
- 1964–1965 Victoria Hotspurs

Club	Times
Nadur Youngsters	11
Ghajnsielem	6
Victoria Hotspurs	4
Xewkija Tigers	4
Xagħra United	3
Sannat Lions	2
Żebbuġ Rovers	1
SK Victoria Wanderers	1
