= G.F.A. Cup =

- Organiser(s): Gozo Football Association
- Founded: 1972; 54 years ago
- Region: Gozo
- Teams: 14 (2022–23)
- Domestic cup: GFA Super Cup
- Current champions: Xewkija Tigers (12th title)
- Most championships: Xewkija Tigers (12 titles)
- 2025-26 G.F.A. Cup

The GFA Cup, currently known as the BOV GFA Cup for sponsorship reasons, is a knockout football cup competition in Gozo, run by and named after the Gozo Football Association. The competition is played between the clubs of the Gozitan First Division and Second Division. The usual format adopted is that all teams from the Second Division and the teams ranked third to seventh in the previous First Division participate in the preliminary round. The six winning teams make it to the quarter finals together with the remaining top two teams from the First Division.

The current cup holders are Xewkija Tigers who won 2-1 (a.e.t) against Qala in the 2025/26 final, winning their twelfth GFA Cup.

== Finals ==
Key
(R)	Replay
*	Match was won during extra time
†	Match was won via a penalty shoot-out
‡	Match was won after golden goal

Final	Winner	Score	Runner-up
1972–73	S.K. Calypsians	2–1	Xewkija Tigers
1973–74	Għajnsielem	2–0	Sannat Lions
1974–75	Sannat Lions	2–1	Għajnsielem
1975–76	Sannat Lions	0–0 † (Note: Sannat Lions won the 1976 final 4–2 in a penalty shootout.)	Għajnsielem
1976–77	Sannat Lions	1–0	Xewkija Tigers
1977–78	Sannat Lions	1–0	Nadur Youngsters
1978–79	Sannat Lions		Qala St. Joseph
1979–80	No competition was held		
1980–81	Sannat Lions	1–0	Calypsians Bosco Youths
1981–82	Sannat Lions	2–1	Calypsians Bosco Youths
1982–83	Sannat Lions		Xagħra United
1983–84	Xewkija Tigers	1–0	Nadur Youngsters
1984–85	Xewkija Tigers	1–0	Għajnsielem
1985–86	Calypsians Bosco Youths	2–1	Għajnsielem
1986–87	Għajnsielem	1–0	Victoria Hotspurs
1987–88	Nadur Youngsters	1–1	Sannat Lions
1987–88	Nadur Youngsters	0–0 (R) † (Note: Nadur Youngsters won the 1988 final 4–1 in a penalty shootout.)	Sannat Lions
1988–89	Xagħra United	0–0	Victoria Hotspurs
1988–89	Xagħra United	2–1 (R) *	Victoria Hotspurs
1989–90	Xewkija Tigers	2–1	Victoria Hotspurs
1990–91	Xewkija Tigers	2–0	Kerċem Ajax
1991–92	Xagħra United	2–1	Oratory Youths
1992–93	Nadur Youngsters	0–0 † (Note: Nadur Youngsters won the 1993 final 4–3 in a penalty shootout.)	Xagħra United
1993–94	Nadur Youngsters		Sannat Lions
1994–95	Nadur Youngsters	2–0	Għajnsielem
1995–96	Nadur Youngsters		Sannat Lions
1996–97	Victoria Hotspurs	4–3 ‡	Xagħra United
1997–98	Xagħra United	1–0	Victoria Hotspurs
1998–99	Xagħra United	1–1 † (Note: Xagħra United won the 1999 final 3–1 in a penalty shootout.)	Għajnsielem
1999–2000	Xewkija Tigers	3–2	Sannat Lions
2000–01	Għajnsielem	0–0 † (Note: Għajnsielem won the 2001 final 4–2 in a penalty shootout.)	Kerċem Ajax
2001–02	Xewkija Tigers	2–1	Nadur Youngsters
2002–03	Għajnsielem	3–2	Nadur Youngsters
2003–04	Nadur Youngsters	4–2	Żebbuġ Rovers
2004–05	Xewkija Tigers	2–1	Għajnsielem
2005–06	Kerċem Ajax	3–1	Għajnsielem
2006–07	Għajnsielem	2–0	Victoria Hotspurs
2007–08	Qala St. Joseph	2–2 † (Note: Qala St. Joseph won the 2008 final 5–4 in a penalty shootout.)	Għajnsielem
2008–09	S.K. Victoria Wanderers	5–2	Victoria Hotspurs
2009–10	Sannat Lions	2–1 *	Kerċem Ajax
2010–11	Nadur Youngsters	1–0	Sannat Lions
2011–12	Xewkija Tigers	1–0	Xagħra United
2012–13	Kerċem Ajax	4–3 *	Nadur Youngsters
2013–14	Nadur Youngsters	3–0	Oratory Youths
2014–15	Xewkija Tigers	2–1	Oratory Youths
2015–16	Xewkija Tigers	2–0	Għajnsielem
2016–17	Għajnsielem	5–0	Oratory Youths
2017–18	Xewkija Tigers	2–1 *	Għajnsielem
2018–19	Victoria Hotspurs	3–2 *	Nadur Youngsters
2019–21	No final was held (Note: Competition abandoned due to the COVID-19 pandemic.)		
2021–22	Nadur Youngsters	3–2	Għajnsielem
2022–23	Nadur Youngsters	6-0	Għajnsielem
2023–24	Qala St. Joseph	4-1	Nadur Youngsters
2022–23	Nadur Youngsters	3-0	Kerċem Ajax

== Results by team ==
Teams shown in italics are no longer in existence.

Club	Wins	First final won	Last final won	Runners-up	Last final lost	Total final appearances
Nadur Youngsters	11	1987–88	2024–25	7	2023–24	18
Xewkija Tigers	11	1983–84	2017–18	2	1976–77	13
Sannat Lions	9	1974–75	2009–10	6	2010–11	15
Għajnsielem	6	1973–74	2016–17	13	2022–13	19
Xagħra United	4	1988–89	1998–99	4	2011–12	8
Victoria Hotspurs	2	1996–97	2018–19	6	2008–09	8
Kerċem Ajax	2	2005–06	2012–13	4	2024–25	6
Qala St. Joseph	2	2007–08	2023–24	1	1978–79	3
Oratory Youths (Note: Includes a title win under the Calypsians Bosco Youths name.)	1	1972–73	1972–73	6	2016–17	7
S.K. Calypsians	1	1972–73	1972–73	—	—	1
S.K. Victoria Wanderers	1	2008–09	2008–09	—	—	1
Żebbuġ Rovers	—	—	—	1	2003–04	1
