= Freedom Day Cup =

- Organiser(s): Gozo Football Association
- Founded: 1978; 48 years ago
- Abolished: 2013; 13 years ago
- Teams: 2 (last edition)
- Last champions: Nadur Youngsters (5th title)
- Most championships: Sannat Lions (6 titles)

The Freedom Day Cup was a football competition that took place in Gozo, Malta and that was organised by the Gozo Football Association.

This competition was just a final between two teams and it takes place on Freedom Day, that is March 31. The first Freedom Day Cup took place in the season 1978–1979, that is the same year that Malta gained its freedom, and the last edition was held during the 2012–2013 season.

== Format ==
The first two teams in the table of the second round from the First Division competed for the Freedom Day Cup.

== Cup Winners ==
Here is a complete list of the past champions of the Freedom Day Cup.

- 2012-2013 Nadur Youngsters
- 2011-2012 Xewkija Tigers
- 2010-2011 Sannat Lions
- 2009-2010 Victoria Hotspurs
- 2008-2009 Victoria Wanderers
- 2007-2008 Victoria Hotspurs
- 2006-2007 Nadur Youngsters
- 2005-2006 Ghajnsielem
- 2004-2005 Nadur Youngsters
- 2003-2004 Żebbuġ Rovers
- 2002-2003 Nadur Youngsters
- 2001-2002 Nadur Youngsters
- 2000-2001 Ghajnsielem
- 1999-2000 Żebbuġ Rovers
- 1998-1999 Xewkija Tigers
- 1997-1998 Sannat Lions
- 1996-1997 Xewkija Tigers
- 1995-1996 was not held
- 1994-1995 was not held
- 1993-1994 was not held
- 1992-1993 was not held
- 1991-1992 was not held
- 1990-1991 was not held
- 1989-1990 was not held
- 1988-1989 was not held
- 1987-1988 was not held
- 1986-1987 was not held
- 1985-1986 was not held
- 1984-1985 was not held
- 1983-1984 was not held
- 1982-1983 was not held
- 1981-1982 Sannat Lions
- 1980-1981 Sannat Lions
- 1979-1980 Sannat Lions
- 1978-1979 Sannat Lions

Club	Times
Sannat Lions	6
Nadur Youngsters	5
Xewkija Tigers	3
Żebbuġ Rovers	2
Ghajnsielem	2
Victoria Hotspurs	2
S.K. Victoria Wanderers	1
