= GFA Super Cup =

- Organiser(s): Gozo Football Association
- Founded: 1988; 38 years ago
- Region: Gozo
- Teams: 2
- Current champions: Kerċem Ajax (2nd title)
- Most championships: Victoria Hotspurs / Nadur Youngsters (9 titles)
- 2026 Super Cup

The GFA Super Cup, known as BOV Super Cup for sponsorship reasons, is an annual football super cup held before the league season start in Gozo. The match is contested by the champions of the previous First Division season and the holders of the GFA Cup.

The current holders are the league champions Kerċem Ajax who defeated Xewkija Tigers 4-1 in the final played on 5 September 2026.

== Results ==
Year	Winner	Score	Runner-up
1989	Xagħra United		Victoria Hotspurs
1990	Victoria Hotspurs		Xagħra United
1991	Victoria Hotspurs		Xagħra United
1992	Victoria Hotspurs	1–0	Xewkija Tigers
1993	Nadur Youngsters		Xagħra United
1994	Victoria Hotspurs		Nadur Youngsters
1995	Nadur Youngsters		Xagħra United
1996	Victoria Hotspurs		Nadur Youngsters
1997	Victoria Hotspurs		Nadur Youngsters
1998	Nadur Youngsters		Victoria Hotspurs
1999	Għajnsielem	6–2	Xagħra United
2000	Victoria Hotspurs	2–0	Għajnsielem
2001	Għajnsielem	2–1 (a.e.t)	Żebbuġ Rovers
2002	Għajnsielem	2–0	Żebbuġ Rovers
2003	Nadur Youngsters	2–1	Xewkija Tigers
2004	Għajnsielem	5–1	Victoria Hotspurs
2005	Xewkija Tigers	3–1	Għajnsielem
2006	Kerċem Ajax	2–0	Xewkija Tigers
2007	Nadur Youngsters	2–1	Għajnsielem
2008	Qala St. Joseph	3–0	Nadur Youngsters
2009	Sannat Lions	1–1 (a.e.t); 5–4 (pen.)	S.K. Victoria Wanderers
2010	Victoria Hotspurs		Sannat Lions
2011	Sannat Lions	3–2	Nadur Youngsters
2012	Xewkija Tigers	3–0	Xagħra United
2013	Nadur Youngsters	2–0	Kerċem Ajax
2014	Nadur Youngsters	2–0	Xewkija Tigers
2015	Xewkija Tigers	3–1	Oratory Youths
2016	Xewkija Tigers	5–2	Għajnsielem
2017	Xewkija Tigers	2–1	Għajnsielem
2018	Victoria Hotspurs	4–2	Xewkija Tigers
2019	Nadur Youngsters	3–0	Victoria Hotspurs
2022	Għajnsielem	4-2	Nadur Youngsters
2023	Nadur Youngsters	2-0	Għajnsielem
2024	Nadur Youngsters	1-2	Qala Saints
2025	Qala Saints	2–1 (a.e.t)	Nadur Youngsters
2026	Kerċem Ajax	4-1	Xewkija Tigers

== Results by club ==
Club	Wins	Last final won	Runners-up	Last final lost	Total appearances
Nadur Youngsters	9	2023	7	2022	16
Victoria Hotspurs	9	2018	4	2019	13
Għajnsielem	5	2022	6	2023	11
Xewkija Tigers	5	2017	5	2018	10
Sannat Lions	2	2012	1	2010	3
Qala St. Joseph	2	2024	—	—	2
Kerċem Ajax	2	2026	1	2013	3
Xagħra United	1	1989	5	1999	6
Żebbuġ Rovers	—	—	2	2002	2
S.K. Victoria Wanderers	—	—	1	2009	1
Oratory Youths	—	—	1	2015	1
