= Ampol Cup =

Ampol Cup may refer to the following Australian sporting competitions sponsored by Ampol, a former Australian petroleum company:

- Ampol Cup (1959–1985), a soccer knockout competition held in New South Wales, currently known as the Waratah Cup. See also: National Soccer League#Origin
- Ampol Cup, (1959–1991) a soccer knockout competition in Queensland, now known as the Canale Cup
- Ampol Cup, (1964–1976) a soccer knockout competition in Tasmania, Australia, currently known as the Milan Lakoseljac Cup
- Ampol Tournament, a golf competition that ran from 1947 until 1959
- China–Australia Ampol Cup, a soccer trophy awarded to the winner of matches between China and the Australia national soccer team during the mid-1980s
