= Northern Athletic A.F.C. =

Association football club on the Isle of Man

Northern Athletic F.C.
- Full name: Northern Athletic Association Football Club
- Founded: 1992
- Ground: Jurby School Playing Fields, School Close; Jurby, Isle of Man
- Capacity: not known
- League: Isle of Man Football League Division Two
- 2008–09: Division Two, 13th
Home colours	Away colours

Northern Athletic A.F.C. was a football club from Jurby in the Isle of Man. They competed in the Isle of Man Football League. They wore a purple and white kit and played their home games at the Jurby School Playing Fields.

Following the 2008–09 season, the club was forced to withdraw from the Isle of Man Football League due to a lack of playing members, as a result the club has now folded.

== History ==
Formed in 1992, they were known as Jurby F.C. until the end of the 2007–08 season. They struggled each season in Division Two often finishing bottom of the league, and in the 2004–05 season went the entire season without winning one league game. They did get two draws and ended up with a total of two points. In June 2008 the club faced extinction when they stated that unless they got a new manager the club might have to pull out of the league and in the 2008–09 they changed their name to Northern Athletic. The club had a reserve team that play in the Isle of Man Football Combination.

A previous club, RAF Jurby, were Isle of Man League champions in 1955–56.
