= 2016–17 Isle of Man Football League =

Isle of Man Football League
- Season: 2016–17

The 2016–17 Isle of Man League was the 108th season of the Isle of Man Football League on the Isle of Man. It began on August 13, 2016 and ended on May 17, 2017. St Georges was the defending champion.

== Promotion and relegation following the 2015–16 season ==
=== From the Premier League ===
Relegated to Division 2

- Marown
- Ramsey YCOB

=== From Division Two ===
Promoted to the Premier League

- Douglas Athletic
- Colby

== League table ==
=== Premier League ===
Pos	Team	Pld	W	D	L	GF	GA	GD	Pts	Qualification or relegation
1	St Georges (C)	24	23	0	1	138	18	+120	69	
2	Corinthians	24	18	1	5	106	45	+61	55	
3	St Marys	24	16	3	5	87	40	+47	51	
4	Rushen United	24	15	3	6	87	44	+43	48	
5	Peel	24	13	5	6	86	29	+57	44	
6	Douglas HSOB	24	13	3	8	61	42	+19	42	
7	St Johns United	24	13	2	9	55	42	+13	41	
8	Laxey	24	10	4	10	78	57	+21	34	
9	Colby	24	7	2	15	48	81	−33	23	
10	Douglas Athletic	24	6	2	16	46	79	−33	20	
11	Ramsey	24	3	5	16	31	88	−57	14	
12	Union Mills (R)	24	1	4	19	35	111	−76	7	Relegation to Isle of Man Division Two
13	Ayre United (R)	24	0	2	22	27	209	−182	−1 (Note: Ayre United were deducted 3 points)	Relegation to Isle of Man Division Two

Source: full-time.thefa.com
Rules for classification: 1) points; 2) goal difference; 3) number of goals scored.
(C) Champions; (R) Relegated
