= Gozo Football Association =

MFA
- Founded: 1936
- Headquarters: Xewkija, Gozo, Malta
- President: Dr. Samuel Azzopardi
- Vice-President: Angelo Grech; Charlie Zammit
- Website: www.gozofa.com

The Gozo Football Association (GFA) is the body that co-ordinates and organises football on the island of Gozo, Malta. Formed in 1936, it organises the Gozo Football League, which is split into two divisions, the First Division and the Second Division. It also organises the G.F.A. Cup, the Independence Cup, the Freedom Day Cup, the BOV Super Cup, the First Division Knock-Out, the Second Division Knock-Out, the Second Division Challenge Cup, the Under-21s League, Under-18 League, and the Under-15s. It also organises the Gozo national football team.

The GFA also ran the Gozo FC which from season 2008–09 was playing in the Maltese Second Division after winning the Maltese Third Division Section B; from 16 matches they recorded 15 wins and a draw.

As of the 2025/26 season, there are 13 Gozitan clubs competing in both divisions.

The GFA's main premises are located at the Gozo Stadium, previously known as the Silver Jubilee Ground, situated at Mġarr Road in Xewkija. The Gozo FA is not a member of the UEFA or FIFA but is a provisional member of the NF-Board.

== Gozo Youth Football Association ==
The Gozo Youth Football Association is affiliated with the association, which itself is a member association of the Malta Football Association. It was formed in 1997 and currently it organises the Gozitan U/16 League and manages the Gozo U-17, U-15 and U-14 teams that compete in the Maltese IFF U17, U15 and U14 BNF National Leagues respectively.
