= Isle of Man Gold Cup =

The Isle of Man Gold Cup, also known as the Paul Henry Gold Cup for sponsorship reasons, is an association football single-elimination tournament held for football clubs in the Isle of Man. It is held annually, and ran similarly to the Isle of Man Railway Cup. The top four sides of the Isle of Man Division 2 compete for the trophy at the end of the season, which is at the end of May.
