= Douglas and District F.C. =

Association football club on the Isle of Man

Douglas and District
- Full name: Douglas and District Football Club
- Nicknames: D&D
- Founded: 1996, as Barclays F.C.
- Ground: Noble's Park; Douglas, Isle of Man
- Chairman: Enzo Ciappelli
- Manager: Wayne Brown
- League: Isle of Man Football League Division Two
- 2025–26: Division Two, 10th of 10
| Home colours | Away colours |

Douglas and District F.C. are a football club from Douglas on the Isle of Man. They compete in the Isle of Man Football League. They play their home games at Noble's Park in Douglas.

== History ==
The club evolved from Barclays (IOM) FC who were formed in 1996. As the number of players affiliated with the bank decreased, the club changed its name to Douglas & District FC in 2002. The club have only ever competed in Division Two. In 2005, Dave Quirk was elected as the club's first Life Member.

The club have a reserve team who compete in the Isle of Man Football Combination. Douglas and District also joined the Isle of Man Football Association Veterans League in 2011, and started junior boys teams in 2012, junior girls teams in 2016 and a walking football team in 2020.

Douglas and District Football Club won the 2007–08, 2014–15 and 2015–16 Fred Faragher Memorial Trophy for the fewest disciplinary points gained by players over the season. Started in 1969, presented by Castletown MFC in memory of Fred Faragher, originally for referee marks for sportsmanship.

Douglas and District were awarded the FA Community Awards Charter Standard Development Club of the Year for 2012–13, 2013–14, 2016–17 and 2021–22.

Each year since 1997, the club has embarked on a tour. The places visited have been as follows:

- 1997 – Dublin
- 1998 – Dublin
- 1999 – Nottingham
- 2000 – Dublin
- 2001 – Blackpool
- 2002 – Dublin
- 2003 – Newcastle upon Tyne
- 2004 – Edinburgh
- 2005 – Blackpool
- 2006 – Cologne, Germany
- 2007 – Brussels, Belgium
- 2008 – Leeds
- 2009 – Las Vegas, United States
- 2010 – Manchester
- 2011 – Chester
- 2012 – Leeds
- 2013 – Nottingham
- 2014 – New York City (official)
  Newcastle upon Tyne (unofficial)
- 2015 – Cardiff
- 2016 – Leeds
- 2017 – Chester
- 2018 – Newcastle upon Tyne
- 2019 – York
- 2020 – Isle of Man*
- 2022 – Sheffield
- 2023 – Benidorm
- 2024 – Liverpool
- 2025 – Kraków, Poland
- 2026 – Budapest

^{*} Due to COVID-19 pandemic.

== Historical kits ==
Home and away kits (if known)
| 1996-98; En-Fin | 1998-2002; Ciappelli's Restaurant | 2002-05; Glenn Cooper Car Sales Limited | 2005-07; A C Electrical | 2007-10; Greenlight Television | 2010-13 2009-11; SMP Partners | 2013-15; La Piazza Ristorante & Pizzeria Harry's Café 2011-15; La Piazza Ristorante & Pizzeria | 2015-18; Specsavers |
| 2018-21; CoinCorner | 2021-24; The Dolly Tub Launderette | 2024-27; The Dolly Tub Launderette | | | | | |

== Ground ==
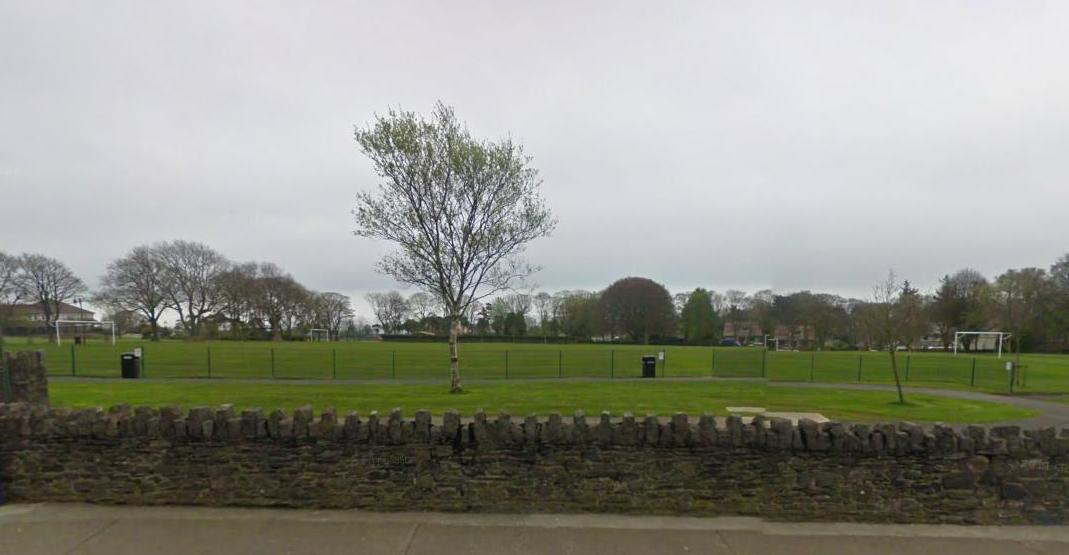
Noble's Park pitch

Douglas and District play their home games at Noble's Park in Douglas, using changing rooms 1 (home) and 2 (away), to the far left of the pavilion. Parking spaces are available at the rear of the pavilion and Grandstand, and are accessible from St. Ninian's Road.

Originally, the club played at Groves Road, just across from Springfield Road, Pulrose. They moved from there at the end of the 2009–10 season. This was due to the demolition of the NSC changing room block. From 14 August to 16 October 2010, Union Mills Football Club kindly allowed the club to play their home games at their Garey Mooar pitch in Braddan.

They played over half of their home matches at Groves Road for the 2020–21 season. They played their home matches at the Bowl for the 2021–22 season. They played their home matches at Groves Road for the 2022–23, 2023–24, 2024–25 and 2025–26 seasons.

== Statistics ==
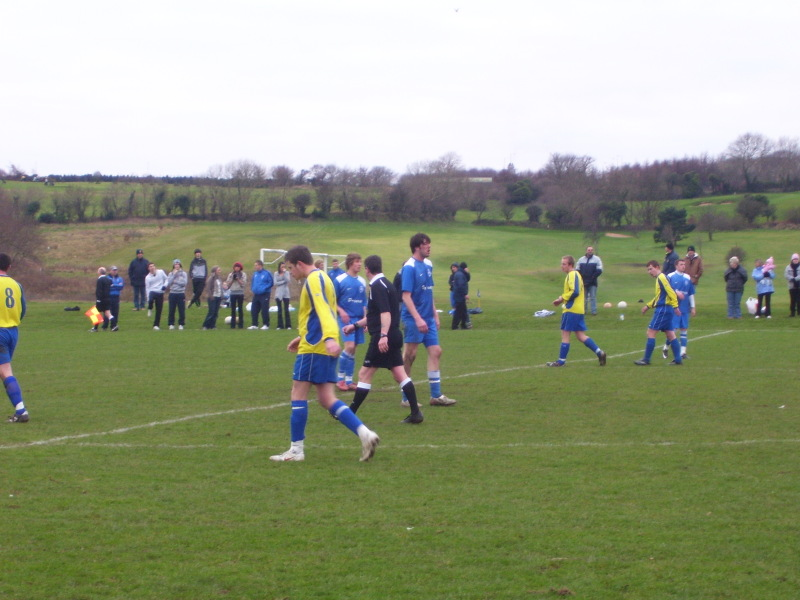
Douglas and District (in yellow) in an Isle of Man FA Cup match against Douglas High School Old Boys F.C. during the 2008–09 season

- Highest League Position: 7th, 2021-22 & 2022–23
- Most League Wins: 10, 2002–03
- Best League Win Percentage: 40.91%, 2021–22
- Least League Defeats: 12, 2021–22
- Best League Defeat Percentage: 53.85%, 2002–03
- Most League Goals Scored: 69, 2002–03
- Best Goals Scored Per League Game Average: 2.65, 2002–03
- Least League Goals Conceded: 82, 1999–2000
- Best Goals Conceded Per League Game Average: 3.15, 1999–2000
- Most League Points: 32, 2002–03
- Best Points Per Game Average: 1.27, 2021–22

== Seasons ==
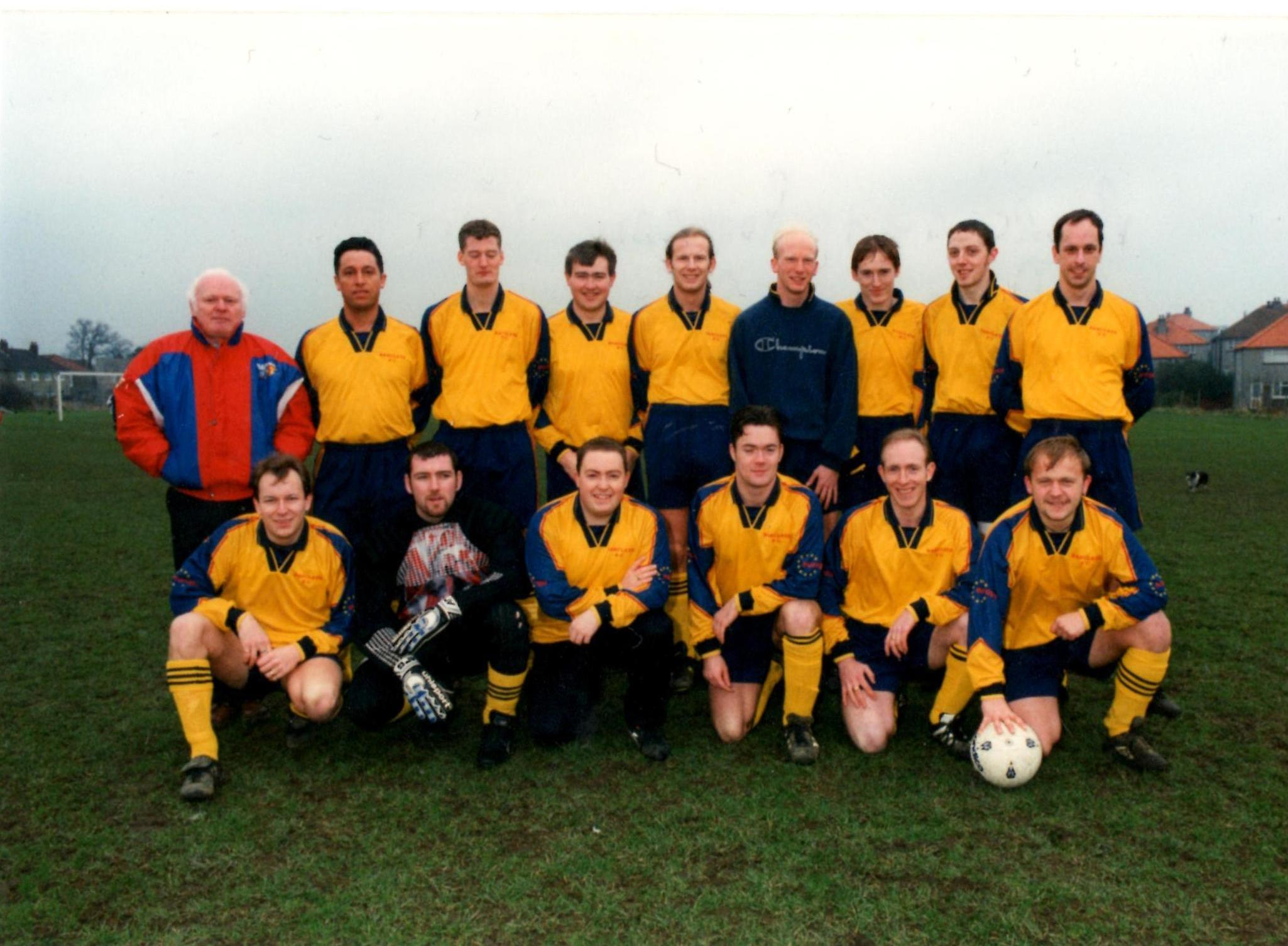
Woods Cup team from debut season in 1997

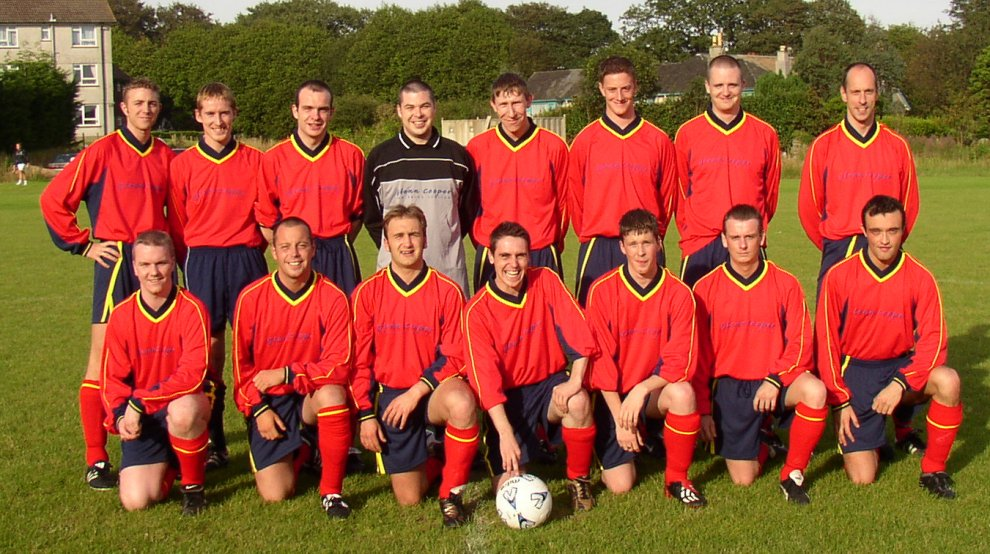
Douglas and District in 2002, the first since the name change

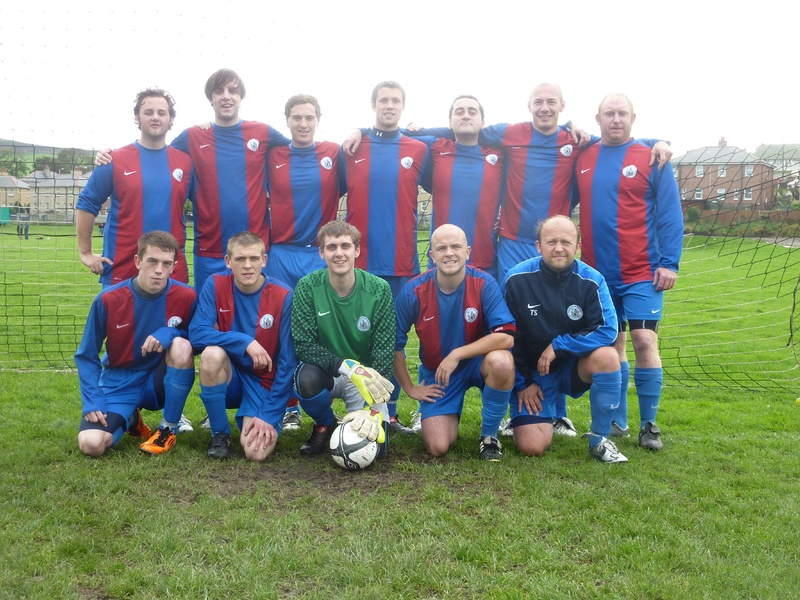
Douglas and District in 2011

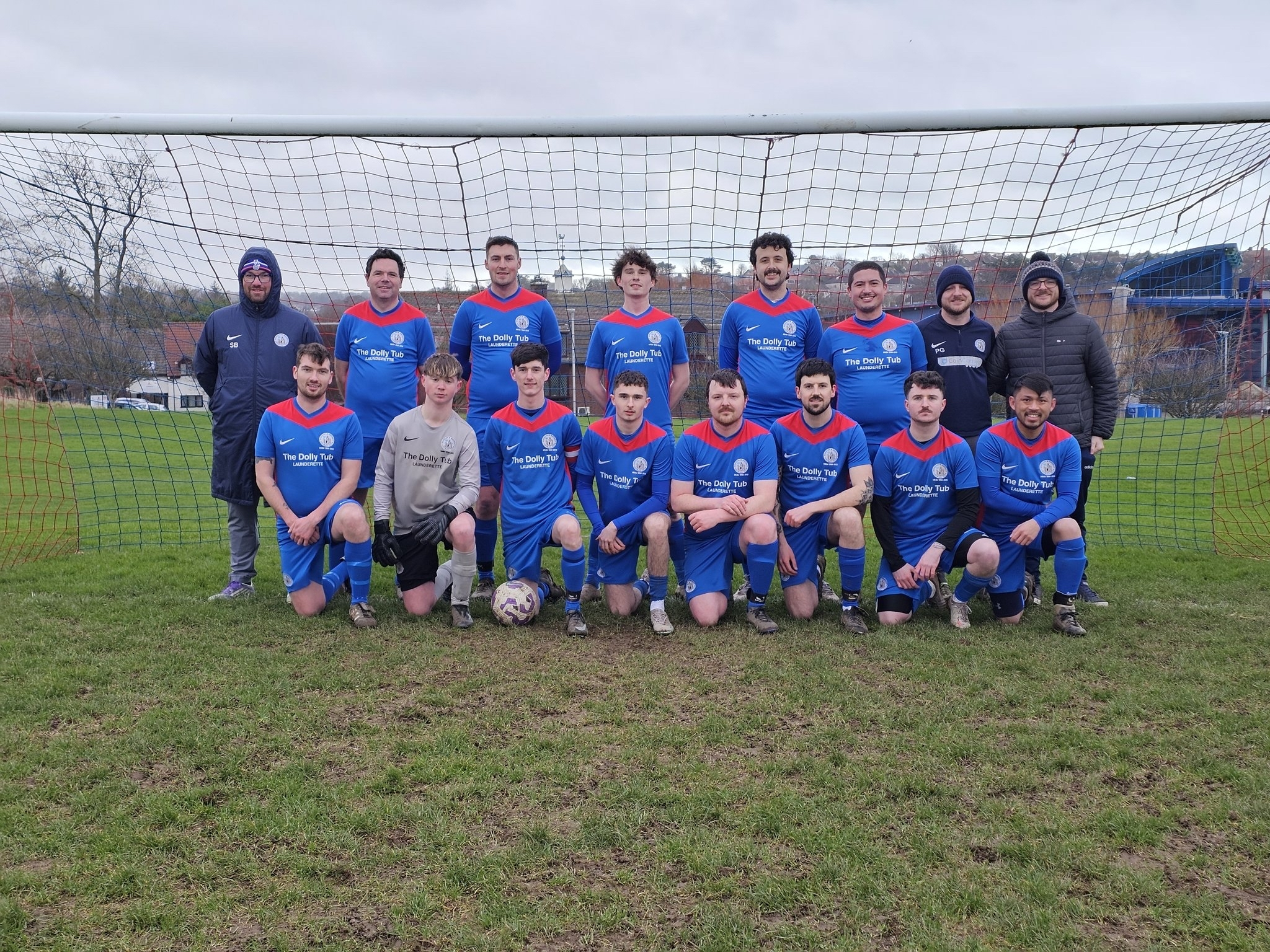
Douglas and District in 2026

| Season | League | | | | | | | | | FA Cup | Woods Cup | Hospital Cup | Junior Cup | Top goalscorer(s) | |
| Season | Division | P | W | D | L | F | A | Pts | Pos | FA Cup | Woods Cup | Hospital Cup | Junior Cup | Name | Goals |
|---|---|---|---|---|---|---|---|---|---|---|---|---|---|---|---|
| 1996–97 | Div 2 | 28 | 0 | 2 | 26 | 18 | 172 | 2 | 15th | R1 | PR | PR | NA | Graham Palmer | 6 |
| 1997–98 | Div 2 | 26 | 3 | 1 | 22 | 31 | 130 | 10 | 13th | PR | QF | R1 | PR | Richard Mulhern | 6 |
| 1998–99 | Div 2 | 26 | 2 | 1 | 23 | 34 | 134 | 7 | 13th | PR | PR | PR | PR | Richard Mulhern | 16 |
| 1999–00 | Div 2 | 26 | 8 | 3 | 15 | 65 | 82 | 27 | 10th | R1 | QF | PR | PR | Richard Mulhern | 27 |
| 2000–01 | Div 2 | 26 | 5 | 2 | 19 | 54 | 109 | 17 | 12th | PR | QF | R1 | PR | Mathew Bartlett | 15 |
| 2001–02 | Div 2 | 24 | 4 | 3 | 17 | 28 | 94 | 15 | 12th | PR | PR | PR | PR | Mathew Bartlett | 8 |
| 2002–03 | Div 2 | 26 | 10 | 2 | 14 | 69 | 94 | 32 | 9th | R1 | PR | PR | PR | Mathew Bartlett | |
| 2003–04 | Div 2 | 26 | 6 | 5 | 15 | 63 | 89 | 23 | 11th | R1 | QF | PR | QF | Richard Mulhern | |
| 2004–05 | Div 2 | 26 | 4 | 3 | 19 | 43 | 84 | 15 | 12th | R1 | PR | R1 | PR | Mathew Bartlett | 22 |
| 2005–06 | Div 2 | 26 | 6 | 1 | 19 | 44 | 92 | 19 | 11th | PR | PR | R1 | R1 | Lawrence Looney | |
| 2006–07 | Div 2 | 26 | 2 | 3 | 21 | 41 | 135 | 9 | 13th | R1 | PR | PR | R1 | | |
| 2007–08 | Div 2 | 26 | 7 | 3 | 16 | 64 | 106 | 24 | 10th | PR | PR | PR | PR | James McIlhagga | 16 |
| 2008–09 | Div 2 | 26 | 7 | 1 | 18 | 51 | 117 | 22 | 10th | PR | QF | PR | PR | Richard Brant | 14 |
| 2009–10# | Div 2 | 24 | 5 | 2 | 17 | 38 | 90 | 17 | 12th | PR | PR | PR | PR | Richard Brant; Vincenzo Marsella | 5 |
| 2010–11 | Div 2 | 24 | 6 | 1 | 17 | 46 | 87 | 19 | 10th | PR | QF | PR | PR | Daniel Stewart-Clague | 17 |
| 2011–12 | Div 2 | 24 | 6 | 2 | 16 | 42 | 86 | 20 | 11th | PR | PR | R1 | PR | Konrad Kumor | 10 |
| 2012–13 | Div 2 | 24 | 8 | 1 | 15 | 44 | 70 | 25 | 10th | QF | PR | QF | PR | Craig Cowin | 12 |
| 2013–14 | Div 2 | 24 | 7 | 1 | 16 | 38 | 73 | 22 | 11th | PR | QF | R1 | PR | Daniel Stewart-Clague | 12 |
| 2014–15 | Div 2 | 24 | 2 | 3 | 19 | 30 | 96 | 9 | 12th | PR | QF | R1 | R1 | Daniel Stewart-Clague | 8 |
| 2015–16 | Div 2 | 24 | 3 | 5 | 16 | 47 | 97 | 14 | 12th | PR | SF | PR | R1 | Daniel Stewart-Clague | 16 |
| 2016–17 | Div 2 | 24 | 6 | 2 | 16 | 53 | 85 | 20 | 10th | QF | QF | PR | R1 | Daniel Stewart-Clague | 20 |
| 2017–18 | Div 2 | 24 | 7 | 2 | 15 | 43 | 85 | 23 | 9th | PR | SF | R1 | PR | Daniel Stewart-Clague | 28 |
| 2018–19 | Div 2 | 24 | 7 | 0 | 17 | 57 | 97 | 21 | 10th | PR | PR | PR | QF | Daniel Stewart-Clague | 19 |
| 2019–20CV | Div 2 | 17 | 1 | 5 | 11 | 24 | 60 | 8 | 10th | PR | QF | NA | NA | Daniel Stewart-Clague | 7 |
| 2020–21 | Div 2 | 24 | 8 | 1 | 15 | 56 | 90 | 25 | 9th | PR | NA | NA | PR | Daniel Stewart-Clague | 17 |
| 2021–22 | Div 2 | 22 | 9 | 1 | 12 | 47 | 87 | 28 | 7th | PR | SF | R1 | R1 | Daniel Stewart-Clague | 13 |
| 2022–23 | Div 2 | 20 | 5 | 3 | 12 | 36 | 61 | 18 | 7th | R1 | PR | PR | PR | Daniel Stewart-Clague | 7 |
| 2023–24 | Div 2 | 22 | 4 | 4 | 14 | 43 | 80 | 16 | 9th | PR | QF | R1 | PR | Richard Radcliffe; Adrian Skrabucha | 7 |
| 2024–25 | Div 2 | 20 | 0 | 3 | 17 | 26 | 99 | 3 | 11th | R1 | PR | PR | R1 | Dan Robson | 6 |
| 2025–26 | Div 2 | 27 | 1 | 2 | 24 | 12 | 143 | 5 | 10th | PR | QF | R1 | PR | Richard Radcliffe | 4 |

Key

- P = Played
- W = Games won
- D = Games drawn
- L = Games lost
- F = Goals for
- A = Goals against
- Pts = Points
- Pos = Final position
- Div 2 = Isle of Man Football League Division Two
- PR = Preliminary Round
- R1 = Round 1
- QF = Quarter Finals
- SF = Semi Finals
- ^ = Only 13 teams not 14 entered Division Two for 2001/2002.
- # = Jurby disbanded prior to the 2009/2010 season, leaving 13 teams in Division Two.
- CV = The season was abandoned, due to the COVID-19 pandemic.
