= Isle of Man Hospital Cup =

The Isle of Man Hospital Cup, also known as the Keystone Law Hospital Cup for sponsorship reasons, is an association football single-elimination tournament held for football clubs in the Isle of Man. It was created in 1921 by Noble's General Hospital, and is overseen by the Isle of Man Football Association. Money is raised for the hospital during matches and a percentage of the final gate receipts to a charity on the Isle of Man. The cup competition includes a group stage and a knock-out stage for all divisions in the Isle of Man Football system.

== List of champions ==
- 1921/22 – Gymnasium
- 1922/23 – Gymnasium
- 1923/24 – Castletown
- 1924/25 – Peel
- 1925/26 – Rushen United
- 1926/27 – unknown
- 1927/28 – Rushen United
- 1928/29 – Peel
- 1930/31 – Rushen United
- 1931/32 – Peel
- 1932/33 – Peel
- 1933/34 – Peel
- 1934/35 – Rushen United
- 1935/36 – Braddan
- 1936/37 – Braddan
- 1937/38 – Peel
- 1938/39 – Rushen United
- 1939–45 – not held due to WWII
- 1945/46 – Braddan
- 1947/48 – unknown
- 1948/49 – Colby
- 1949/50 – Castletown
- 1950/51 – Rushen United
- 1952/53 – Braddan
- 1954/55 – St Johns United
- 1955/56 – Laxey
- 1956/57 – Corinthians
- 1958/59 – Michael United
- 1959/60 – Corinthians
- 1960/61 – Michael United
- 1962/63 – Michael United
- 1963/64 – Rushen United
- 1967/68 – Peel
- 1968/69 – Peel
- 1969/70 – Peel
- 1970/71 – Pulrose United
- 1971/72 – Peel
- 1972/73 – Peel
- 1973/74 – Malew
- 1974/75 – Rushen United
- 1975/76 – Rushen United
- 1976/77 – Peel
- 1977/78 – not held
- 1978/79 – Castletown
- 1979/80 – Peel
- 1980/81 – Rushen United
- 1981/82 – unknown
- 1982/83 – Rushen United
- 1983/84 – Castletown
- 1984/85 – Castletown
- 1985/86 – Rushen United
- 1986/87 – Gymnasium
- 1987/88 – Douglas HSOB
- 1988/89 – Rushen United
- 1989/90 – Peel
- 1990/91 – Peel
- 1991/92 – St Georges
- 1992/93 – Rushen United
- 1993/94 – St Georges
- 1994/95 – Douglas HSOB
- 1995/96 – St Marys
- 1996/97 – Peel
- 1997/98 – St Marys
- 1998/99 – Peel
- 1999/00 – St Marys
- 2000/01 – Rushen United
- 2001/02 – St Marys
- 2002/03 – St Marys
- 2003/04 – Laxey
- 2004/05 – Douglas Royal
- 2005/06 – Laxey
- 2006/07 – Laxey
- 2007/08 – St Georges
- 2008/09 – St Georges
- 2009/10 – Peel
- 2010/11 – St Georges
- 2011/12 – St Georges
- 2012/13 – St Georges
- 2013/14 – Douglas HSOB
- 2014/15 – St Georges
- 2015/16 – St Georges
- 2016/17 – St Georges
- 2017/18 – St Georges
- 2018/19 – St Georges
- 2019/20 – Not held due to COVID pandemic.
- 2020/21 – Not held due to COVID pandemic.
- 2021/22 – Rushen United
- 2022/23 – Laxey
- 2023/24 – Ramsey
- 2024/25 – Ramsey
