= Isle of Man FA Cup =

- Organiser(s): Isle of Man Football Association
- Founded: 1889; 137 years ago
- Region: Isle of Man
- Teams: 25 (2018–19)
- Current champions: Ayre United
- Website: FA Cup
- 2021–22 Isle of Man FA Cup

The Isle of Man Football Association Cup is the foremost football cup competition for teams playing on the Isle of Man. The tournament, founded in 1889, features the twenty six teams from the Isle of Man Premier League and Division 2. The tournament is overseen by the Isle of Man Football Association.

Peel are the most successful club, with 32 titles.

== List of champions ==
- 1889/90 Douglas
- 1890/91 Peel
- 1891/92 Peel and Ramsey (shared)
- 1892/93 Ramsey
- 1893/94 Ramsey
- 1894/95 Gymnasium
- 1895/96 Ramsey
- 1896/97 Douglas
- 1897/98 Douglas Wanderers
- 1898/99 Ramsey
- 1899/1900 Ramsey
- 1900/01 Ramsey
- 1901/02 Gymnasium
- 1902/03 Gymnasium
- 1903/04 Gymnasium
- 1904/05 Ramsey
- 1905/06 Port St Mary
- 1906/07 Ramsey
- 1907/08 Ramsey
- 1908/09 Peel
- 1909/10 Douglas Wanderers
- 1910/11 Gymnasium
- 1911/12 Ramsey
- 1912/13 St Marys
- 1913/14 Castletown
- 1919/20 Ramsey
- 1920/21 Gymnasium
- 1921/22 Ramsey
- 1922/23 Castletown
- 1923/24 Rushen United
- 1924/25 Rushen United
- 1925/26 Rushen United
- 1926/27 Peel
- 1927/28 Douglas Wanderers
- 1928/29 St Georges
- 1929/30 Peel
- 1930/31 Ramsey
- 1931/32 Gymnasium
- 1932/33 Peel
- 1933/34 Rushen United
- 1934/35 Peel
- 1935/36 Rushen United
- 1936/37 Peel
- 1937/38 Braddan
- 1938/39 Peel
- 1945/46 Peel
- 1946/47 St Georges
- 1947/48 Peel
- 1948/49 Peel
- 1949/50 Castletown
- 1950/51 Rushen United
- 1951/52 Ramsey
- 1952/53 Peel
- 1953/54 Peel
- 1954/55 St Georges
- 1955/56 RAF Jurby
- 1956/57 St Georges
- 1957/58 Peel
- 1958/59 Peel
- 1959/60 Peel
- 1960/61 Peel
- 1961/62 Castletown
- 1962/63 Peel
- 1963/64 Peel
- 1964/65 Douglas HSOB
- 1965/66 Douglas HSOB
- 1966/67 Douglas HSOB
- 1967/68 Douglas HSOB
- 1968/69 Peel
- 1969/70 Douglas HSOB
- 1970/71 Pulrose United
- 1971/72 St Johns United
- 1972/73 Peel
- 1973/74 Peel
- 1974/75 Peel
- 1975/76 St Johns United
- 1976/77 Peel
- 1977/78 Rushen United
- 1978/79 Ramsey
- 1979/80 Ramsey
- 1980/81 Ramsey
- 1981/82 Peel
- 1982/83 Douglas HSOB
- 1983/84 Peel
- 1984/85 Castletown
- 1985/86 Gymnasium
- 1986/87 Gymnasium
- 1987/88 Gymnasium
- 1988/89 Douglas HSOB
- 1989/90 Rushen United
- 1990/91 Douglas HSOB
- 1991/92 Douglas HSOB
- 1992/93 Castletown
- 1993/94 St Marys
- 1994/95 St Marys
- 1995/96 Douglas HSOB
- 1996/97 Peel
- 1997/98 St Marys
- 1998/99 Peel
- 1999/2000 Gymnasium
- 2000/01 St Marys
- 2001/02 St Marys
- 2002/03 Ayre United
- 2003/04 Ramsey
- 2004/05 St Georges
- 2005/06 Laxey
- 2006/07 Peel
- 2007/08 St Georges
- 2008/09 Douglas HSOB
- 2009/10 St Georges
- 2010/11 Rushen United
- 2011/12 St Georges
- 2012/13 St Marys
- 2013/14 St Georges
- 2014/15 St Georges
- 2015/16 Peel
- 2016/17 St Georges
- 2017/18 Corinthians
- 2018/19 Peel
- 2019/20 not held
- 2020/21 Corinthians
- 2021/22 Ayre United
- 2022/23 Corinthians
- 2023/24 Rushen United
- 2024/25 Ayre United
