= Gymnasium F.C. =

Association football club on the Isle of Man

Coordinates: 54.164676°N 4.493056°W

Gymnasium A.F.C.
- Full name: Gymnasium Association Football Club
- Nickname: Gymns
- Founded: 1890
- Ground: Tromode Park, Tromode Road; Douglas, Isle of Man
- Chairman: James Brown
- Manager: Jay Clague
- League: Isle of Man Football League Division Two
- 2025–26: Combination Two - 6th
Home colours

Gymnasium A.F.C. are a football club in Douglas on the Isle of Man, competing in the Isle of Man Football League. The team play their home matches at Tromode Park in Douglas, sporting a light blue and white shirt, black shorts, and light blue socks.

== History ==
Gymnasium A.F.C. was founded on Saturday 11 October 1890, at a meeting held in the reading room of the Douglas Gymnasium. In the meeting it was decided, on the casting vote of the chairman, that the club would adopt the Association code, rather than Rugby, which was more prevalent on the Isle of Man at the time.This meeting is fully reported in the Isle of Man Times edition dated Wednesday 15 October 1890.

Gymns were one of eight teams that initially made up the official Manx Football League.

The club has been Isle of Man Football League champions seven times, including four consecutive championships from 1902–03 to 1905–06. They have also won the Manx FA Cup ten times.

The club experienced an internal power struggle during 1987, resulting in the resignation of a section of the committee and players to form spin off club Douglas Royal, who even copied the Gymns kit of the time and to this day are considered a rival club.

In 2001–02 Gymns were relegated to Division Two, but were promoted back to Division One the following season as runners-up. However, they spent just one season back in the top flight, finishing the season having won just two games. Then in the following season, 2004–05, they again earned promotion as runners-up. Following that turbulent period, the club was able to consolidate its position within the top tier.

In addition to the Senior team, the club has a reserve team that play in the Isle of Man Football Combination.

Thanks to links with a Premier League club, Gymns were donated a playing kit for the 2002–03 season. A mix-up in communication resulted in blue/white stripe shirts being provided instead of the club's traditional all-white. As a result, Gymns altered the club colours to reflect this new kit, later switching the shorts and socks from blue to black.

During the 2008–09 season, the club achieved The Football Association Charter Standard status, the FA's kitemark scheme for quality assurance.

The 2013-14 Season saw a strong trophy haul for the club, with both the first and the combination teams winning their respective league titles, as well as lifting the Woods Cup trophy.

The club then experienced a lean spell and have been back in the second division for a number of years.

== Season Commentary ==
=== 2024–25 ===
Gymns were only able to field a combination side. The team struggled for a lot of the season, sitting bottom of the table on just 7 points by the end of January. After some tactical changes and re-recruitment, Gymns saw improvement and were able to finish the season strongly, earning 16 points from the final 7 matches (5W-1D-1L), with the only loss in that run being to league champions, Colby. This late run saw Gymns climb up the table to a 10th place finish.

=== 2025–26 ===
Gymns were again only able to field a combination side. With no official manager, players on the club committee stepped up to lead the squad until a new manager can be appointed.

After starting the season with just 1 point from the opening 3 games, the team impressively climbed to 4th in the table following a 5-match unbeaten streak (DWWWD) that included 3 victories by a margin of 5+ goals. On 10 January 2026, Gymns equalled their points tally from the prior season (23) in 6 less matches. Gymns showed a big improvement from the prior season, with their Points-per-Game being 0.41 higher, goal difference being 58 better, and achieving a 6th place finish.

2026-27

The 2026/27 season saw Gymnasium & Douglas Athletic merge clubs.

== Performance ==
Season	League	P	W	D	L	GD	Pts	Pos
2025–26	Combination 2	24	11	2	11	+3	35	6th
2024–25	Combination 2	22	7	2	13	-55	23	10th

*Active season

== Current Squad ==
GK	DEF	MID	FWD
Joe Saunders	Adam Clucas	Andrew Burkitt	Ally Sinclair
Filipe Santos	Alessandro Mazzotta	Corben Kewley	Cameron Comber
Phil Cowin	Alex Hamilton	Dean Corlett	Theo Boland
Reece Skillen	Alex McKeeman	Daniel Kewley (c)	Courage Ohikhuae
	Hayden Gray	Marc Costello	Mokebe Malatjie
	Vinnie Bevan	Matthew McKeeman	Joe Price
	Joe Hoy		Lee Ford
			Carl Wagstaffe

== Partnerships ==
In early-2025, it was agreed that Celton would become the club's primary sponsor for the upcoming 2025-26 Season.

The club is a member of the Cronkbourne Sports & Social Club, which also includes the Cronkbourne Cricket Club and the Cronkbourne Bacchanalians Hockey Club. This partnership enables the CSSC pavilion facilities to be used during the football season to provide a further level of comfort to home and visiting players.

== Honours ==
League Titles
League	No.	Years
Division One	7	1897-98, 1902-03, 1903-04, 1904-05, 1905-06, 1919-20, 1986-87
Division Two	4	1970-71, 1974-75, 1981-82, 2013-14
Division Two Combination	1	2013-14

Cup Victories
Competition	No.	Years
Manx FA Cup	10	1894–95, 1901–02, 1902–03, 1903–04, 1910–11, 1931–32, 1985–86, 1986–87, 1987–88, 1999–2000
Railway Cup	5	1906–07, 1924–25, 1927–28, 1950–51, 1986–87
Hospital Cup	3	1921–22, 1922–23, 1986–87
Omnitec Invitational Trophy	1	2009-10
Woods Cup	1	2013-14
