= List of churches on the Isle of Man =

The following is a list of churches in the Isle of Man.

The Island has an estimated 94 active churches for 84,497 inhabitants, a ratio of one church for every 899 people.

Several of the churches are Isle of Man registered buildings.

== Active churches ==
Name	Civil parish (settlement)	Website	Founded	Denomination	Benefice	Notes
Vineyard Church	Peel	www.vineyardchurch.im	2024	Non-denominational		
St Andrew, Andreas	Andreas		Ancient	Church of England	Northern Plain	Rebuilt 1802
St Jude Chapelry, Andreas	Andreas			Church of England	Northern Plain	
St Columba, Ballabeg	Arbory (Ballabeg)		Ancient	Church of England	Arbory and Castletown	Current building 1759
Ballabeg Methodist Church	Arbory (Ballabeg)			Methodist		
Ballakilpheric Methodist Chapel	Arbory (Ballakilpheric)			Methodist		
Colby Methodist Church	Arbory (Colby)			Methodist		
St Mary de Ballaugh, Ballaugh	Ballaugh		1823	Church of England	Northern Plain	
Kirk Braddan	Braddan		1876	Church of England	Braddan	
St Bridget, Bride	Bride			Church of England	Bride, Lezayre & N Ramsey	
Bride Methodist Church	Bride			Methodist		
St Mary's on the Harbour, Castletown	Castletown		1865	Church of England	Arbory and Castletown	
St Mary's Catholic Church, Castletown	Castletown		c. 1826	Roman Catholic		Not mentioned in Catholic Directory. Note: Separate building linked with St Columba, Port Erin
Castletown Methodist Church	Castletown			Methodist		
St George, Douglas	Douglas		1781	Church of England	Douglas St George	
St Matthew the Apostle, Douglas	Douglas		1897–1908	Church of England	Douglas St Matthew	
St Ninian, Douglas	Douglas		1914	Church of England	Douglas St Ninian	
St Thomas the Apostle, Douglas	Douglas			Church of England	Douglas St Thomas	
St Barnabas Church, Douglas	Douglas		2021	FCE		Formerly known as St Augustine; joined the FCE in 2020 and changed their name
St Mary of the Isle Church, Douglas	Douglas			Roman Catholic		
Broadway Baptist Church	Douglas		1890	Baptist Union		Building 1905
Trinity Methodist Church	Douglas			Methodist		
Promenade Methodist Church	Douglas			Methodist		
St Andrew's URC, Douglas	Douglas		1825	United Reformed		Building 1832. Moved to smaller building 1970s
Douglas Salvation Army	Douglas			Salvation Army		
Isle of Man Quaker Meeting	Douglas			Quakers		
Living Hope Community Church, Douglas	Douglas			Four12		
St John the Baptist (The Royal Chapel), St John's	German (St John's)		Medieval	Church of England	West Coast	Rebuilt 1849
St John's Methodist Church	German (St John's)			Methodist		
St Patrick, Jurby	Jurby		Ancient	Church of England	Northern Plain	Rebuilt 1813. May no longer hold services
Christ Church, Laxey	Laxey			Church of England	Onchan, Lonan & Laxey	
Laxey Methodist Church	Laxey			Methodist		
St Fingan, Glen Auldyn	Lezayre (Glen Auldyn)			Church of England	Bride, Lezayre & N Ramsey	
St Stephen, Sulby	Lezayre (Sulby)		1838	Church of England	Northern Plain	
Sulby Methodist Church	Lezayre (Sulby)			Methodist		
Kirk Malew	Malew		Medieval	Church of England	Malew and Santan	
St Mary (Abbey Church), Ballasalla	Malew (Ballasalla)			Church of England	Malew and Santan	
Ballasalla Methodist Church	Malew (Ballasalla)			Methodist		
St Mark, St Marks	Malew (St Marks)		1772	Church of England	Malew and Santan	Built as a chapel of ease to Malew
Ballagarey Methodist Church	Malew (St Marks)			Methodist		
Marown Parish Church	Marown			Church of England	Marown, Foxdale & Baldwin	
St Luke, Baldwin	(Baldwin)		1836	Church of England	Marown, Foxdale & Baldwin	Replaced an earlier chapel dedicated to St Abban
Crosby Methodist Church	Marown (Crosby)			Methodist		
Kirk Maughold	Maughold		Ancient	Church of England	Maughold & S Ramsey	
Christ Church, Dhoon	(Dhoon)			Church of England	Maughold & S Ramsey	
St Michael & All Angels, Michael	Michael		?	Church of England	West Coast	Current building 1835, fourth church on site
Kirk Michael Methodist Church	Michael			Methodist		
St Peter, Onchan	Onchan			Church of England	Onchan, Lonan & Laxey	
St Anthony, Onchan	Onchan			Roman Catholic		
St Joseph, Willaston	Onchan			Four 12		
Onchan Baptist Church	Onchan		1970	?		Building 1978
Onchan Methodist Church	Onchan			Methodist		Redeveloped 1988
Onchan Elim Church	Onchan		1983	Elim		
Holy Trinity, Patrick	Patrick		1714	Church of England	West Coast	Previous parish church was St Patrick's within Peel Castle
St James, Dalby	Patrick (Dalby)		1839	Church of England	West Coast	
St Paul, Foxdale	Patrick (Foxdale)		1847	Church of England	Marown, Foxdale & Baldwin	Chapel established 1847, present church dedicated 1880
Cathedral Church of St German, Peel	Peel		1879-1884	Church of England	West Coast	Original cathedral of St German's, within Peel Castle, fell into disrepair. Church rebuilt in Peel centre, replacing St Peter's church
St Patrick, Peel	Peel			Roman Catholic		
Grace Baptist Church Peel	Peel			Grace Baptist Assoc		
Peel Methodist Church	Peel			Methodist		
Peel Elim Community Church	Peel			Elim		
Living Hope Community Church, Peel	Peel			Four12		
Christ Church, Port Erin	Port Erin			Church of England	Rushen	
St Catherine, Port Erin	Port Erin			Church of England	Rushen	
St Columba, Port Erin	Port Erin			Roman Catholic		
Grace Baptist Church, Port Erin	Port Erin		1970	Independent		Building 1980
Village Church, Port Erin	Port Erin		2018	Independent (NWGP)	Port Erin, Port St Mary, Colby	Formerly Grace Community Church
Port Erin Methodist Church	Port Erin			Methodist		
St Mary, Port St Mary	Port St Mary			Church of England	Rushen	
Port St Mary Methodist Church	Port St Mary			Methodist		
Living Hope Community Church, Port St Mary	Port St Mary			Four12		
The Howe Methodist Church	Port St Mary (The Howe)			Methodist		
St Olave, N Ramsey	Ramsey			Church of England	Bride, Lezayre & N Ramsey	
St Paul, Ramsey	Ramsey		1822	Church of England	Maughold & S Ramsey	
Our Lady Star of the Sea & St Maughold, Ramsey	Ramsey			Roman Catholic		
Ramsey Baptist Church	Ramsey		2007	?		Church plant from Broadway Baptist Church, Douglas
Ramsey Methodist Church	Ramsey		1892	Methodist		
Ramsey Independent Methodist Church	Ramsey		1835	Independent Methodist		
Trinity URC, Ramsey	Ramsey			United Reformed		Building 1884
Church on the Rock (Ramsey Elim Church)	Ramsey			Elim		
Living Hope Community Church, Ramsey	Ramsey			Four12		
St Peter, Cregneish	Rushen (Cregneish)			Church of England	Rushen	
St Sanctain, Santan	Santon			Church of England	Malew and Santan	
Abbeylands Methodist Church	Abbeylands		1813	Methodist		
Agneash Methodist Church	Agneash			Methodist		
Baldrine Methodist Church	Baldrine		1843	Methodist		
Ballafesson Methodist Church	Ballafesson			Methodist		
Barregarrow Methodist Church	Barregarrow			Methodist		
Kerrowkeil Methodist Church	Kerrowkeil		c. 1710	Methodist		
Cooil Methodist Church	Cooil			Methodist		
Glen Maye Methodist Church	Glen Maye			Methodist		
Orrisdale Methodist Church	Orrisdale			Methodist		
Pulrose Methodist Church	Pulrose			Methodist		
Sandygate Methodist Church	Sandygate			Methodist		
Union Mills Methodist Church	Union Mills			Methodist		

== Defunct churches ==
Name	Civil parish (settlement)	Website	Founded	Closed	Denomination	Notes
St Mary (Old Church), Ballaugh	Ballaugh		11th century		Church of England	
Old Kirk Braddan	Braddan		1777		Church of England	Possibly existed earlier
Holy Trinity, Lezayre (AKA Kirk Christ Lezayre)	Lezayre			2013	Church of England	Closed 2013
All Saints, Lonan	Lonan		1834	2015	Church of England	Closed for worship 2015
St Adamnan, Lonan	Lonan					Redundant C19th but preserved
Old St Runius, Crosby	Marown (Crosby)				Church of England	Ruins only
All Saints, Douglas	Douglas			2017	Church of England	

== See also ==
- Registered Buildings of the Isle of Man
