= Ronague =

Coordinates: 54.1200°N 4.686°W

Ronague: Manx: Eairy Shynnagh
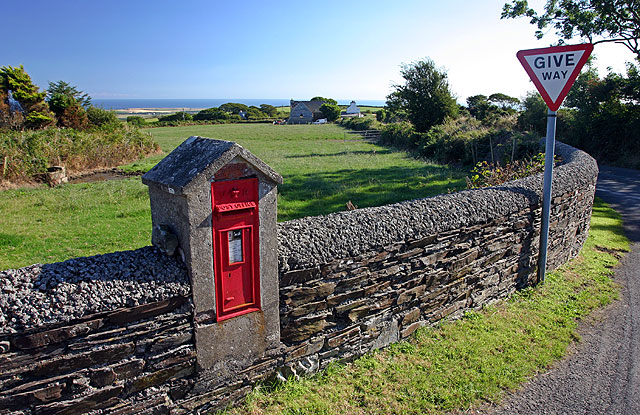
- Victorian postbox at Ronague

- Location within the Isle of Man
- Population: (2006 Census)
- OS grid reference: SC245727
- Parish: Arbory
- Sheading: Rushen
- Crown dependency: Isle of Man
- Post town: ISLE OF MAN
- Postcode district: IM9
- Dialling code: 01624
- Police: Isle of Man
- Fire: Isle of Man
- Ambulance: Isle of Man
- House of Keys: Rushen

Ronague (Manx: Eairy Shynnagh or Ronnag) is a tiny hamlet in the south of the Isle of Man, in the parish of Arbory. It consists of an old chapel, several houses and some farms. It lies to the north of the villages of Ballabeg and Colby, west of the hamlet of Grenaby and south of the hill South Barrule.

On the A27 road between Ronague and the Round Table is the seemingly magical magnetic hill. A gravity hill, it appears to pull cars uphill when their drive is not engaged (grid reference SC2431773571).
