= Ballabeg =

Village on the Isle of Man

Coordinates: 54.100°N 4.679°W

Ballabeg: Manx: Balley Beg
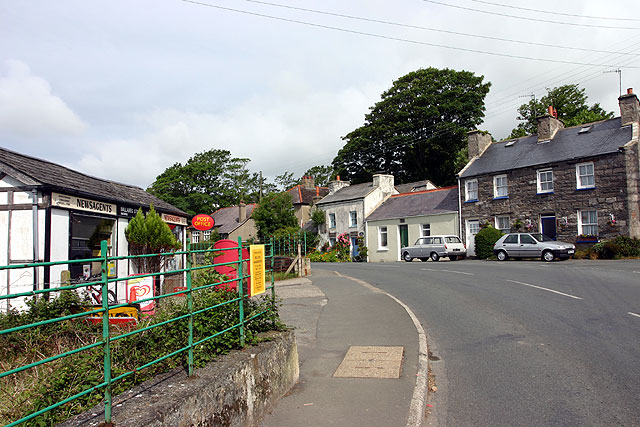
- A7 road through the centre of Ballabeg

- Location within the Isle of Man
- OS grid reference: SC248704
- Parish: Arbory
- Sheading: Rushen
- Crown dependency: Isle of Man
- Post town: ISLE OF MAN
- Postcode district: IM9
- Dialling code: 01624
- Police: Isle of Man
- Fire: Isle of Man
- Ambulance: Isle of Man
- House of Keys: Rushen

Ballabeg (Manx: Balley Beg) is a village on the Isle of Man. It is in the parish of Arbory in the sheading of Rushen, in the south of the island near Castletown. There are several small villages and hamlets with the name, although Ballabeg in Arbory is the most well-known and populous.

== History ==
The name Ballabeg derives from the Manx Balley Beg which means "small homestead"; although the spelling is different, it is pronounced approximately the same as the English name. The village has previously been recorded on Ordnance Survey maps simply as the village of 'Arbory'. The parish church and school still use this name. There was a small farm with the name 'Ballabeg' but the location of this farm is not certain. At some point in the late 19th or early 20th century the name 'Ballabeg' was applied to the whole village.

The village first grew up around the site of a 13th-century Franciscan friary at Bemaken, the only Franciscan church on the Isle of Man. William de Montecute, 1st Earl of Salisbury and King of Mann, petitioned Pope Urban V to build a Franciscan friary on the island. The Pope granted permission for the construction of a "church or oratory, with a bell tower, bell, cemetery, houses and other necessary offices" for a small community of 12 friars. The friars came from Ireland rather than England. The friary was dedicated to Saint Francis and was built around 1373. It was dissolved in 1540 under King Henry VIII during the Dissolution of the Monasteries. Very little remains of the original friary other than the chapel, which is now in use as a barn.

For much of the history of the village, the community was primarily based around agriculture. In recent years with construction of modern housing estates, many inhabitants of the village now commute daily to Douglas.

== Access and facilities ==
The village consists of mostly residential property and had a tiny shop and Post Office, but this closed in April 2006 and was demolished for rebuilding in January 2009. The single-storey shop has been replaced with a two-storey building.

=== Road links ===
The village is situated on the main A7 that connects Ballasalla with Port Erin in the south-west of the island. There are also B roads that join the main road at the village. The village is served by Bus Vannin routes 1, 11, and 12.

The Billown Circuit course that is used for the Southern 100 motorcycle road-race passes by the village at the hairpin junction at the A28 Castletown to Ballabeg road.

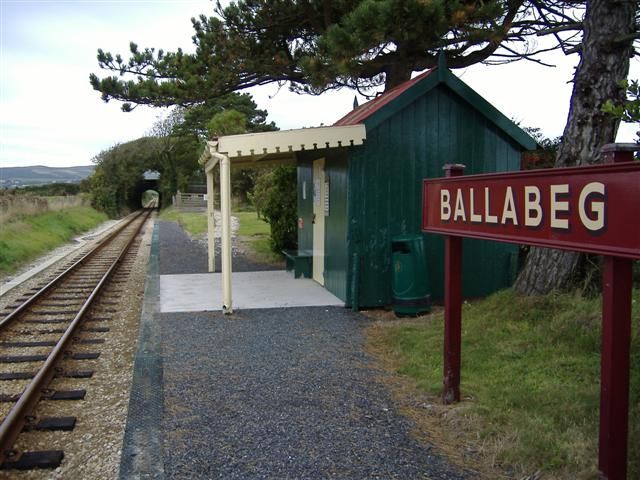
Ballabeg railway stop

=== Rail links ===
The village is served seasonally by the Isle of Man Railway, a heritage steam train railway. There is a request stop at Ballabeg station. The station consists of a small wooden hut which provides shelter for waiting passengers. There is another station with the same name, but serving a different village, on the Manx Electric Railway to the north.

=== Education ===
It also has Arbory Primary School, serving the villages of Ballabeg, Ronague and Colby, as well as the outlying areas. The school had 180 pupils attending the school in 2017. After year six, pupils generally attend Castle Rushen High School in Castletown.

== Laa Columb Killey ==
The annual parish festival, Laa Columb Killey, is the parish's main event of the year. It traditionally alternated between Ballabeg and Colby, but in recent years has been held only in Ballabeg. It commemorates the parish's patron saint, Columba. Laa Columb Killey is Manx for St Columba's Day. The festival consists of events such as exhibitions for produce, crafts, and flowers, traditional Manx dance and music, fancy dress, and sports competitions. The festival was cancelled in 2020 due to COVID-19 pandemic restrictions.

== Churches ==
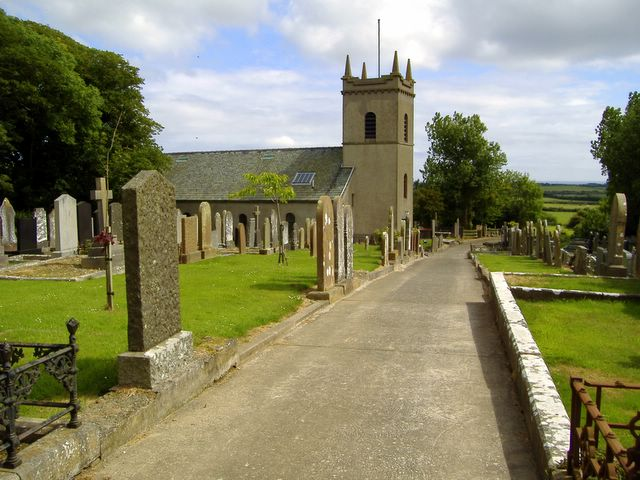
St Columba, Arbory Parish Church

Arbory parish church of St Columba is located in Ballabeg. It also has a graveyard and a vicarage adjacent to the site. The present church building was most likely built on the site of a much older early Christian keeill (small chapel). The church was dedicated in 1759 by Bishop Mark Hildesley. The exterior church walls were originally whitewashed before being coated in grey pebbledash in the 20th century. The bell tower was added in 1915 in memory of local physician and Manx traditional music collector Dr. John Clague who was buried in the graveyard. The large churchyard has graves dating back at least to the mid-18th century. Its best known occupant is Captain John Quilliam, who helped steer the damaged HMS Victory as First Lieutenant at the Battle of Trafalgar. Manx lexicographer Archibald Cregeen was also buried there.

Ballabeg also has a small Methodist chapel. A former Methodist chapel in the village has been converted into a parish hall.

== Local government and representation ==
The lowest-level local authority is Arbory and Rushen Parish Commissioners. In 2019 Rushen and Arbory Parish commissioners joined to govern the two parishes. There are three commissioners representing each parish. Phil Gawne is currently clerk.

Ballabeg is in the Keys constituency of Arbory, Castletown & Malew.
