= List of parishes of the Isle of Man =

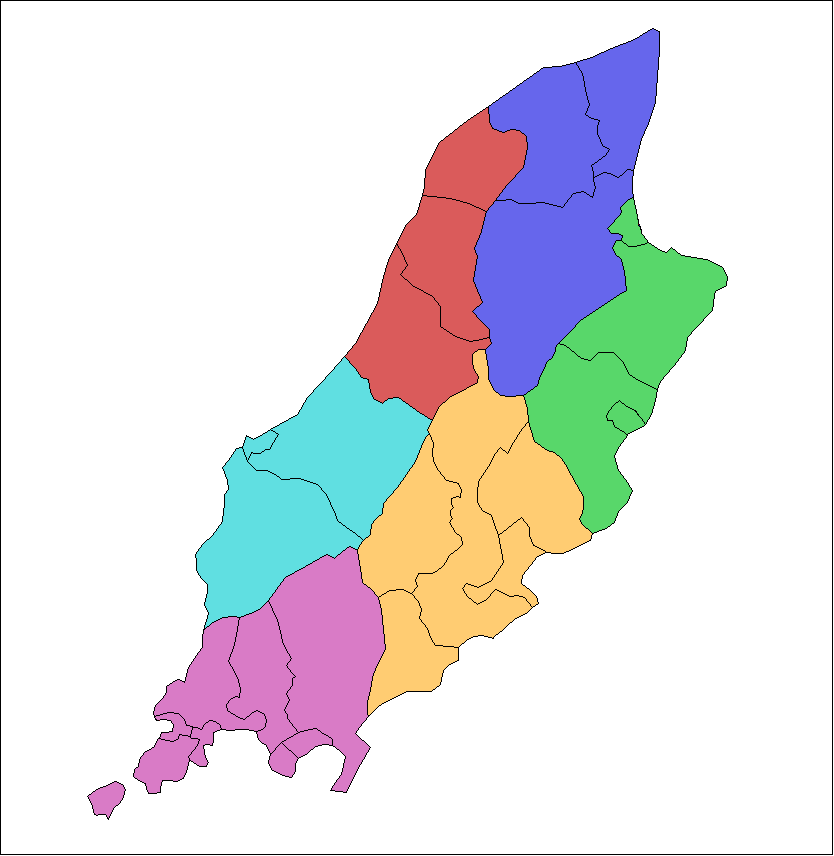
Sheadings and districts of the Isle of Man.

The Isle of Man, a self-governing British Crown Dependency, in the Irish Sea has 17 historic parishes and was, until May 2016, divided into 24 districts for administrative purposes. These were 15 remaining parishes, 4 towns (one of which, Douglas, later became a city) and 5 villages, each forming the lowest unit of local government in the Isle of Man.

In May 2016, the three districts of Laxey, Lonan and Maughold merged for administrative purposes to form the parish district of Garff. In 2020 the two parish districts of Arbory and Rushen merged for administrative purposes to form the parish district of Arbory and Rushen. The total number of administrative districts thus reduced to 21, made up of:

- one city
- three towns
- two "districts" (Michael and Onchan, both of which are historically parishes)
- two "village districts" (Port Erin and Port St Mary)
- and 13 "parish districts" (including Garff, which is made up of two historical parishes: Lonan and Maughold).

== Parishes and other units (as at 2016) ==
Image	Name	Status	Sheading	Population	Coordinates	Map
	Andreas	Parish	Ayre	1,397	54°22′N 4°26′W	
	Arbory	Parish	Rushen	1,847	54°6′N 4°41′W	
	Ballaugh	Parish	Michael	1,032	54°19′N 4°33′W	
	Braddan	Parish	Middle	3,621	54°9′N 4°30′W	
	Bride	Parish	Ayre	382	54°23′N 4°24′W	
	Castletown	Town	Rushen	3,216	54°4′N 4°39′W	
	Douglas	City	Middle	26,997	54°9′N 4°29′W	
	German	Parish	Glenfaba	966	54°13′N 4°41′W	
	Jurby	Parish	Michael	776	54°21′N 4°33′W	
	Laxey	Village	Garff	1,676	54°14′N 4°24′W	
	Lezayre	Parish	Ayre	1,276	54°19′N 4°25′W	
	Lonan	Parish	Garff	1,579	54°11′N 4°25′W	
	Malew	Parish	Rushen	2,167	54°6′N 4°39′W	
	Marown	Parish	Middle	2,246	54°11′N 4°34′W	
	Maughold	Parish	Garff	985	54°18′N 4°19′W	
	Michael	Parish	Michael	1,591	54°17′N 4°35′W	
	Onchan	Parish	Middle	9,128	54°10′N 4°27′W	
	Patrick	Parish	Glenfaba	1,576	54°12′N 4°42′W	
	Peel	Town	Glenfaba	5,374	54°13′N 4°41′W	
	Port Erin	Village	Rushen	3,484	54°5′N 4°45′W	
	Port St Mary	Village	Rushen	1,916	54°4′N 4°44′W	
	Ramsey	Town	Garff	7,845	54°19′N 4°23′W	
	Rushen	Parish	Rushen	1,537	54°5′N 4°45′W	
	Santon	Parish	Middle	700	54°7′N 4°35′W	
