= Dalby, Isle of Man =

Coordinates: 54.16667°N 4.73333°W

Dalby: Manx: Delbee
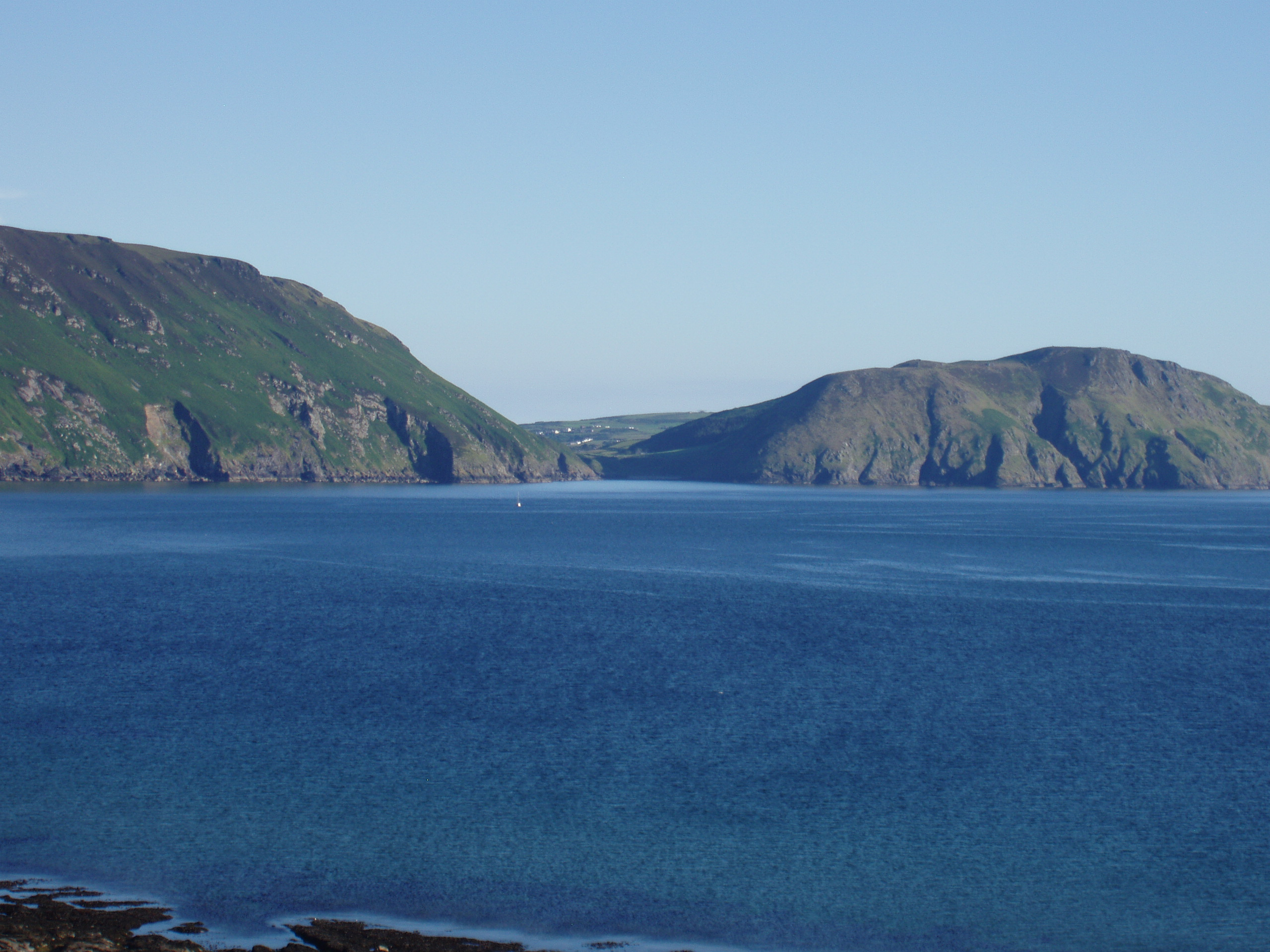
- Niarbyl Bay and the southwest coastline of Isle of Man including Bradda Head (on right) as viewed from Niarbyl.

- Location within the Isle of Man
- OS grid reference: SC2179
- Parish: Patrick
- Sheading: Glenfaba
- Crown dependency: Isle of Man
- Post town: ISLE OF MAN
- Postcode district: IM5
- Dialling code: 01624
- Police: Isle of Man
- Fire: Isle of Man
- Ambulance: Isle of Man
- House of Keys: Glenfaba & Peel

Dalby (Manx: Delbee) is a small hamlet on the Isle of Man, near the western coast. It lies on the A27 Port Erin to Peel road, five miles south of Peel, in the parish of Patrick.

The hamlet looks out towards the Irish Sea from the western side of Dalby Mountain. The Raad ny Foillan long distance coastal footpath runs through Dalby.

Prior to its closure in 2007, the hamlet had a public house called the Ballacallin Hotel which was known for its views of the sunset over Niarbyl. The hotel later went up in flames on 9 February 2021 and was subsequently demolished. Niarbyl is home to a cafe and visitor centre, as well as some traditional Manx cottages. It can be accessed by car, with parking available at the cafe.

During World War II, a radar station was located at Dalby. The radar station consisted of a number of bunkers, still visible in the fields between Dalby and Niarbyl and now part of local farm land.

== Religion ==
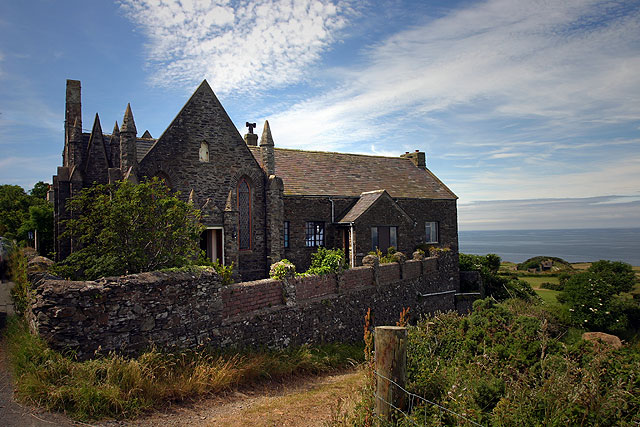
St James' Church, Dalby

St James' church is a Church of England church in the Diocese of Sodor and Man. The church was one of several commissioned by the Bishop of Sodor and Man, William Ward, and was consecrated in 1839. It incorporates classrooms which are now used as the church hall. The church is the centre of the community where locals often gather for community events, and the basement has even been converted to overnight accommodation for rental (often used by walkers passing through the hamlet).

== Notable people ==
- Tom Shear (1889–1954), motorcycle racer was born in Dalby

== See also ==
- Gef aka the Dalby Spook.
