= Joughin =

Joughin is a Manx surname. Notable people with the surname include:

- Charles Joughin (1878–1956), English-American chef
- John Joughin, British university vice-chancellor
- Jonathan Joughin, Manx politician
- Sierah Joughin (1996–2016), American murder victim from Ohio
- Steve Joughin (born 1959), Manx cyclist

== See also ==
- Joughin Glacier
