= Rushen =

Parish on the Isle of Man

Coordinates: 54.084722°N 4.7475°W

Rushen: Manx: Rosien
- Parish of Rushen, Isle of Man
- Population: 1,537
- OS grid reference: SC203689
- Sheading: Rushen
- Crown dependency: Isle of Man
- Post town: ISLE OF MAN
- Postcode district: IM9
- House of Keys: Rushen

Rushen (/ˈrʊʃən/ RUUSH-ən; Manx: Rosien), formally Kirk Christ Rushen, is one of the seventeen historic parishes of the Isle of Man.

It is located in the south of the island (part of the traditional South Side division) in the sheading of the same name.

Administratively, part of the historic parish of Rushen, and the majority of the population, is now covered by the village districts of Port Erin and Port St Mary. As a result, there is an exclave of the parish district which includes the Calf of Man.

Other settlements in the parish include Cregneash.

== Local government ==
For the purposes of local government, the majority of the area of the historic parish formed a single parish district, with Commissioners, but this has now been amalgamated with Arbory.(See Arbory and Rushen.)

Since the 1880s, two areas of the historic parish of Rushen have been the separate village districts of Port Erin and Port St Mary, each with its own village commissioners.

The Captain of the Parish (since 2023) is Paul Costain.

== National politics ==
Rushen parish is split between two House of Keys constituencies: Rushen, covering the majority of the parish including Port Erin and Port St Mary, and the Arbory, Castletown & Malew constituency, which covers the eastern part of the historic parish. Each constituency elects two Members of the House of Keys. Before 2016, the whole parish was in the Rushen constituency.

== Geography ==
Rushen parish includes the southwestern extremity of the island, together with the Calf of Man, along with its rocky outcrops Kitterland and Chicken Rock, and encompasses an area of about 10 square miles (26 km^{2}). It stretches along the coast from Strandhall (located about halfway between Castletown and Port St Mary) to the precipices west of Cronk ny Irrey Laa (Hill of the Day Watch, also spelled Arrey), known as the Stacks or the Slogh, covering a distance of 16 miles (26 km). The principal headlands are Kallow Point, Black Head, Spanish Head (350 feet (110 m)), and Bradda Head (766 feet (233 m)); and the main inlets include Port St Mary Bay, Perwick Bay, Bay Stacka, Port Erin Bay, and Fleshwick Bay.

The west of the parish is hilly, extending southwards from Cronk ny Irrey Laa (437 metres (1,434 ft), the highest point in the parish) along the western coast to Lhiattee ny Beinnee, Bradda Hill, Mull Hill, and the Sound, across which the ridge continues onto the Calf.

Port St Mary and Port Erin are the only significant settlements in the area, although they have now expanded to form a single continuous settlement. Cregneash is a small village and folk museum near Mull Hill. Hamlets include The Howe (located between Cregneash and Port St Mary) and Croit-e-Caley/Ballagawne (towards Colby).

== Demographics ==
The Isle of Man census of 2016 recorded a parish population of 1,537, indicating a decrease of 6% from the figure of 1,629 in 2011. At the time of the 2011 census, 2.64% of the parish population were able to speak Manx Gaelic.

== Rushen Internment Camp in World War Two ==
Rushen was repurposed as a detention camp during World War II, accommodating over 3,500 women and children. These internees, considered "enemy aliens," included many refugees who had previously fled persecution in Europe.

The camp, which operated from 30 May 1940 to September 1945, was the only civilian camp on the island which held women and children as civilian internees. Some of the detainees were lodged with local families, while others were housed in requisitioned boarding houses. The male detainees were held in Douglas.
