= John Corrin =

John Corrin (10 September 1934 – 30 November 2005) was a former Minister in the Isle of Man Government and Member of the House of Keys.

Corrin was educated on the island at Arbory School and Castle Rushen High School, and on leaving school at the age of 17 he joined the British Army. He served in the Royal Electrical and Mechanical Engineers and was posted to many places, including the Middle East from 1953 to 1955, the Rhine Army from 1961 to 1962 and the Far East from 1962 to 1964. He returned to the Isle of Man to marry, and he worked for Malew Engineering Limited at Ronaldsway from 1965 until 1970. He also became involved in the work of the Transport and General Workers Union.

In 1986 he was elected as one of the Members of the House of Keys for Rushen. In 1991, after the General Election, he was appointed Minister of Agriculture, Fisheries and Forestry. In 1995, Corrin moved from his role as Minister and served on numerous Council of Ministers, Tynwald and House of Keys committees. He retired from Tynwald at the 1996 General Election.

== Government positions ==
- Minister of Agriculture, Fisheries and Forestry, 1991–1995
