= Local Government (Amendment) Bill 2023 =

Tynwald
- Long title: A BILL to amend the law relating to local government, in relation to local authority district boundaries, the establishment of joint boards, standards of conduct of local authorities and their members and officers, the status of joint committees, byelaws and the standardisation of such provisions; to insert provisions regarding the disposal of open spaces into the Local Government (Miscellaneous Provisions) Act 1984; to add the circumstances in which the Public Sector Pensions Authority provides assistance under the Public Sector Pensions Act 2011; to add provision for remote attendance at local authority meetings to the Elections (Keys and Local Authorities) Act 2020; to amend the Elections and Meetings (Local Authorities) Act 2021; to repeal the Douglas Market Act 1956 and references to it in other enactments; and for connected purposes.
- Territorial extent: Isle of Man

Legislative history
- First reading: 13 June 2023
- Status: Not passed

The Local Government (Amendment) Bill 2023 is a bill before the Tynwald, the legislature of the Isle of Man.

== Passage ==
The first reading in the House of Keys was on 13 June 2023.

== Provisions ==
The bill aims to update the Local Government Act 1985 to ensure greater transparency and accountability within local government.
