= Colby, Isle of Man =

Village in the United Kingdom

Coordinates: 54.098°N 4.703°W

Colby: Manx: Colby
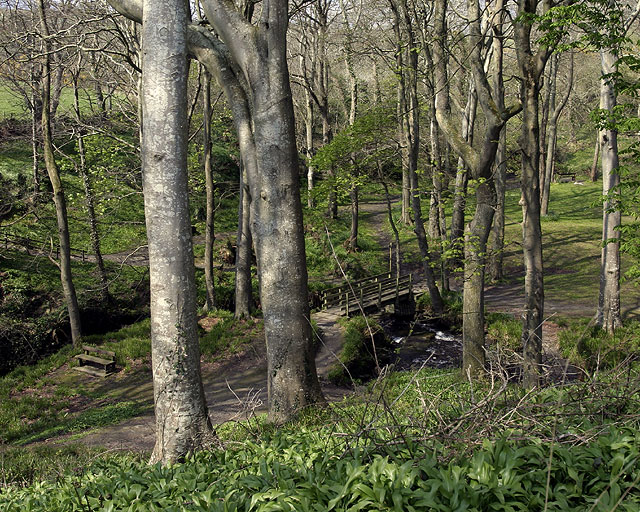
- Colby Glen

- Location within the Isle of Man
- Population: 289
- OS grid reference: SC233702
- Parish: Arbory
- Sheading: Rushen
- Crown dependency: Isle of Man
- Post town: ISLE OF MAN
- Postcode district: IM9
- Dialling code: 01624
- Police: Isle of Man
- Fire: Isle of Man
- Ambulance: Isle of Man
- House of Keys: Rushen

Colby (Manx: Colby) is a small village in the south of the Isle of Man in the parish of Arbory. It lies on the A7 road between the towns of Castletown and Port Erin and close to the similarly sized village of Ballabeg.

== History and facilities ==
The name Colby is of Scandinavian origin, and is thought to derive from the Viking words col (meaning hill) and byr (meaning farm).

The village has a railway station on the Isle of Man Steam Railway and is home to Colby Glen, one of the seventeen National Manx Glens.

The village is home to Colby Football Club who play in the Isle of Man Football League and are based at Station Road.

== Methodism ==
Colby has long been associated with Methodism. John Wesley preached at Balladoole in 1781, invited to do so by a local family. The first Methodist preacher arrived in the village in 1822 and a local house was set up as the Preaching House for Primitive Methodists. By 1883 two Methodist chapels were built, Colby Primitive Methodist Chapel on Main Road which closed in 1950, when the two chapels united and is now a private house. Colby Wesleyan Methodist Chapel on Station Road was also built in 1833.

== Colby Glen ==
Colby Glen is a small valley just north of the village, with ash, beech, elm, and sycamore trees. It is 2.0 hectares or 4.9 acres (20,000 m^{2}). The Colby river runs through it. It is one of the officially-listed Manx National Glens.

== Notable people ==
- Archibald Cregeen (1774–1841), lexicographer, born in Colby
- Norma Lorimer (1864–1948), novelist and travel writer, grew up at Ballasherlodge in Colby
- Miles Walker (born 1940), businessman and politician, from Belle Abbey in Colby
