= Cregneash =

Village and museum on the Isle of Man

Coordinates: 54.0693°N 4.7691°W

Cregneash: Manx: Creneash
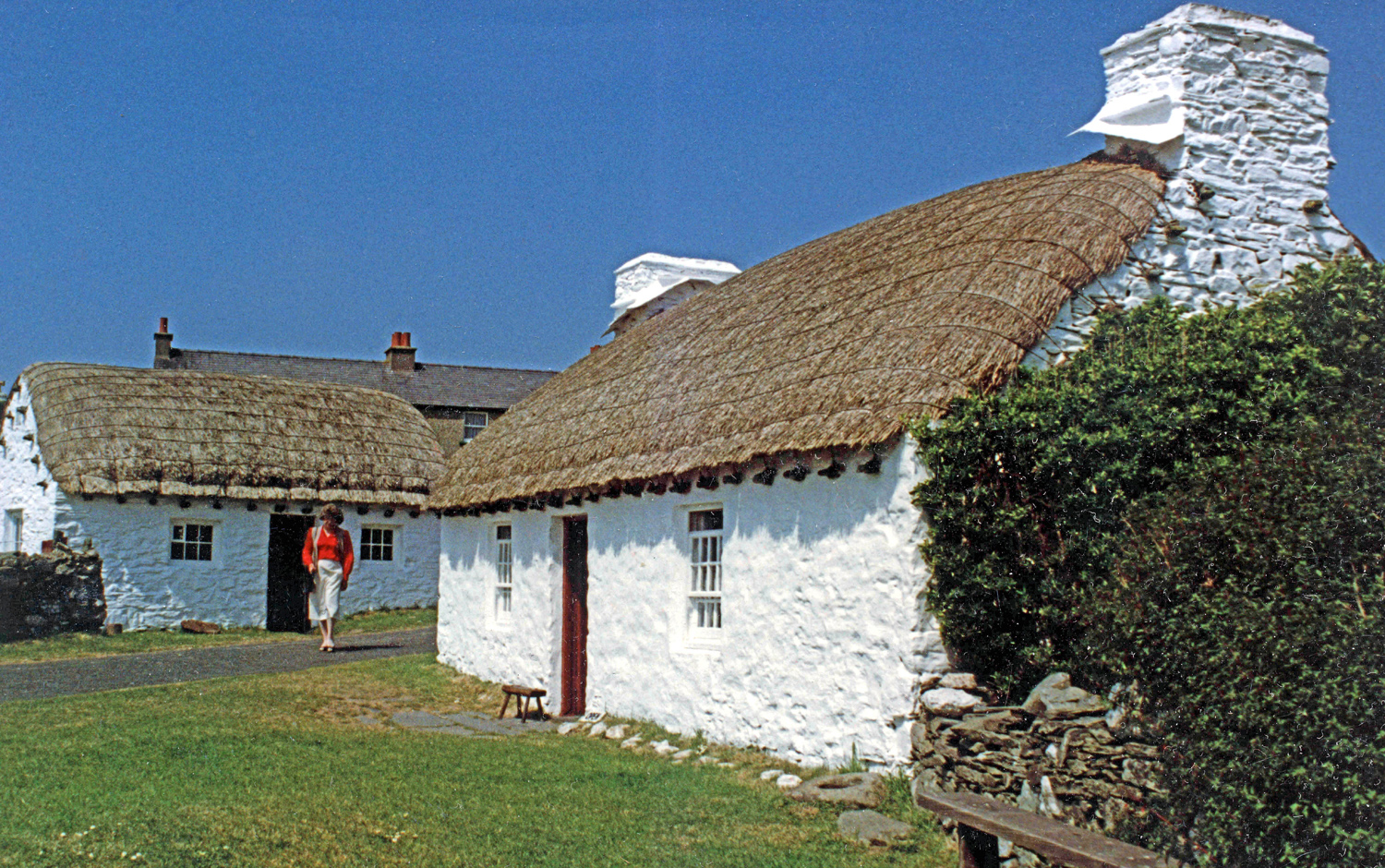
- Harry Kelly's cottage and Woodturner's workshop in Cregneash

- Location within the Isle of Man
- Population: (2006 Census)
- OS grid reference: SC189672
- Parish: Rushen
- Sheading: Rushen
- Crown dependency: Isle of Man
- Post town: ISLE OF MAN
- Postcode district: IM9
- Dialling code: 01624
- Police: Isle of Man
- Fire: Isle of Man
- Ambulance: Isle of Man
- House of Keys: Rushen

Cregneash or Cregneish (Manx: Creneash) is a small village and tourist destination in the extreme south-west of the Isle of Man, about 1 mi (2 km) from Port Erin. Most of the village is now part of a living museum run by Manx National Heritage. There are also a number of private homes in the village, but their external appearance is controlled to maintain an older look. The village was also home to prominent Manx language speakers, Edward Faragher and Ned Maddrell.

== Living museum ==
Much of the village forms a "Living Museum" dedicated to the preservation of the traditional Manx ways of life. Officially opened in 1938, the Cregneash Folk Village shows the typical way of life of a small Manx village in the 19th century. Many original Manx cottages have been preserved and exhibit Victorian farming and fishing equipment. Historically most of the cottages were thatched, and this is reflected on many of the cottages.

A central museum holds a wealth of historical information, whilst many of the cottages in the village allow visitors to see rural activities performed by museum workers in traditional dress. Harry Kelly's cottage in the centre of the village typifies a Manx villager's home, where weaving or knitting often took place in the living area. In the workshop a blacksmith demonstrates some of the tools and techniques used to make horseshoes and other metal equipment of the time.

Edward Faragher's (known in Manx as Ned Beg Hom Ruy or simply Ned Beg) cottage holds an exhibition about the Manx language, as Cregneash was an important location in the survival of the language around the start of the 20th century.

Annual Manx festivals are held in Cregneash and it is home to a flock of the rare four-horned Loaghtan sheep.

Due to the village's relative isolation from other urban areas on the Island, it is one of the 26 Dark Sky Discovery Sites in the Isle of Man.

St. Peter's Church in the centre of the village was built in 1878 and still holds regular worship services on Sundays.

== Manx language ==
Manx as a community language disappeared from most of the Isle of Man in the late 19th century. However it "lingered longer in the more remote areas, such as Cregneash" Many of the last remaining native speakers of Manx that were recorded in the mid-20th century were raised in Cregneash and the surrounding areas.

Manx language poet and author Edward Faragher was born and raised in the village, and wrote extensively about his experiences there, particularly focusing on the practices and attitudes of the older generations of the 19th century:

I think it a great shame to Manx folk that cannot speak their native language. No doubt the old people of Cregneish were not like some others of their neighbours in the little sea-port towns, with the perery bane, keeir-lheeah knee breeches and carranes, but they were more innocent and kinder to one another; they all used to help one another to get the crops down, and in the harvest helped each other to cut the corn and stack it. There was no word about pay.

Ned Maddrell, sometimes called the last native speaker of Manx, was brought up in the village. In the summer of 1947 Irish Taoiseach Éamon de Valera visited him at Harry Kelly's cottage in Cregneash as part of his trip to the Isle of Man. As a fluent speaker of Irish Gaelic, he had a conversation with Ned Maddrell, the youngest of the last remaining native speakers, with Maddrell speaking Manx and de Valera in Gaelic. Maddrell explained his views on the Manx language to de Valera: "I am a Manx nationalist…I don’t mean that we should cut adrift from the Empire, but I think we should preserve what is our own…”

Recordings were later made by the Irish Folklore Commission of Maddrell speaking in Manx at his home in Glenchass near Port St Mary.

== In the media ==
The historic village backdrop has been used in film and television shows. Waking Ned Devine was filmed in the Isle of Man and village scenes were shot in Cregneash, which stood in for the fictional Irish village of Tulaigh Mhór (Tullymore).

The Manx short film Solace in Wicca was shot in various Manx National Heritage locations including Cregneash. The short film was the first production to be shot entirely in Manx Gaelic.

Other films and television shows that were shot in Cregneash include Rocket's Island, Stormbreaker, Treasure Island, Keeping Mum, Mindhorn, and Brand New World aka Woundings.

== Images ==
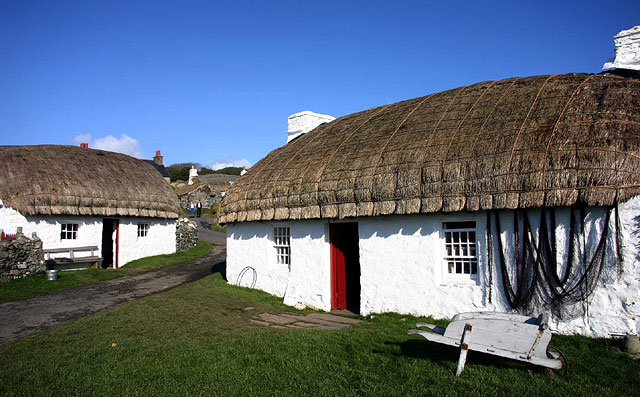
Harry Kelly's Cottage

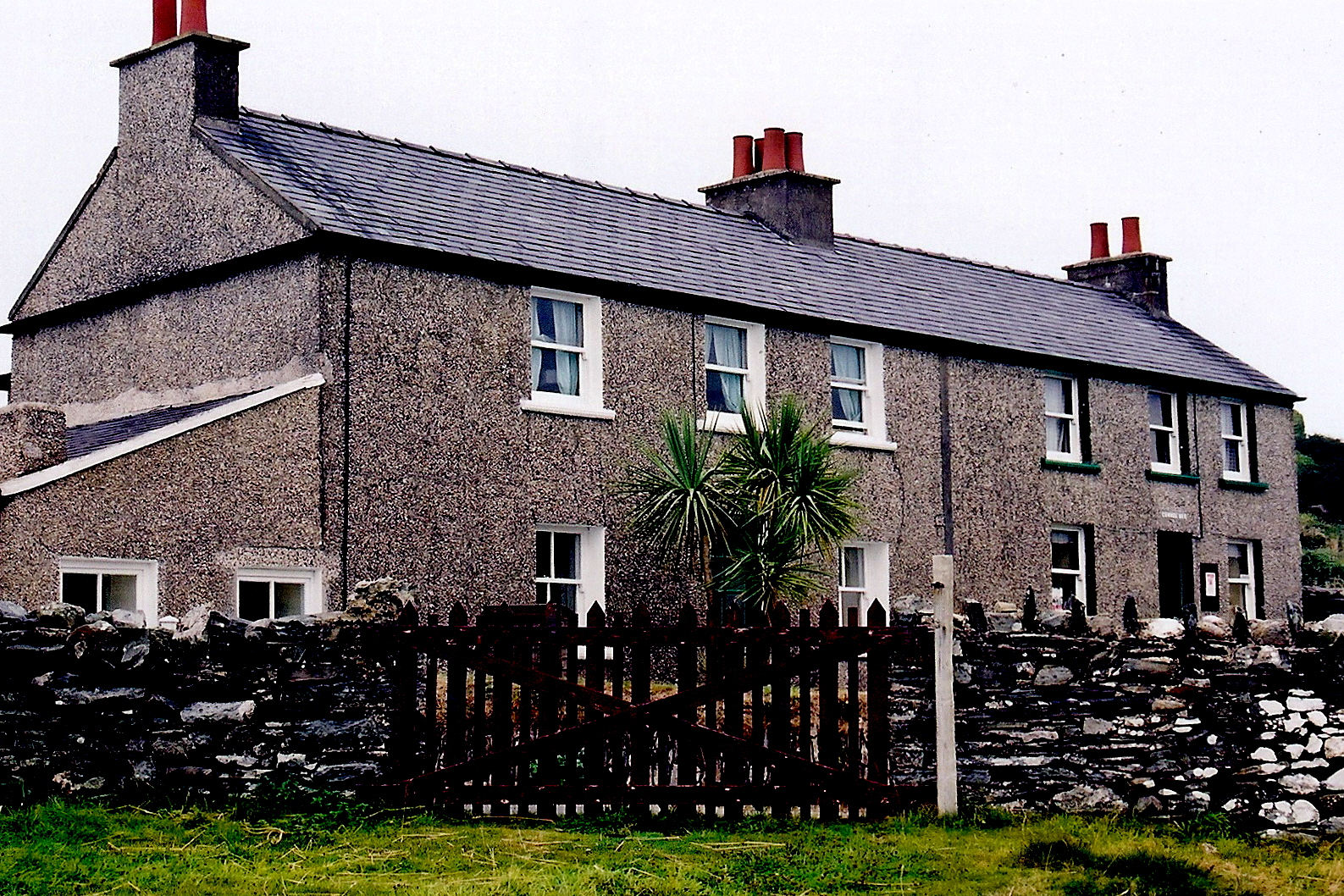
Cummal Beg Visitor Centre (right) and Creg y Shee Tea Room (left)

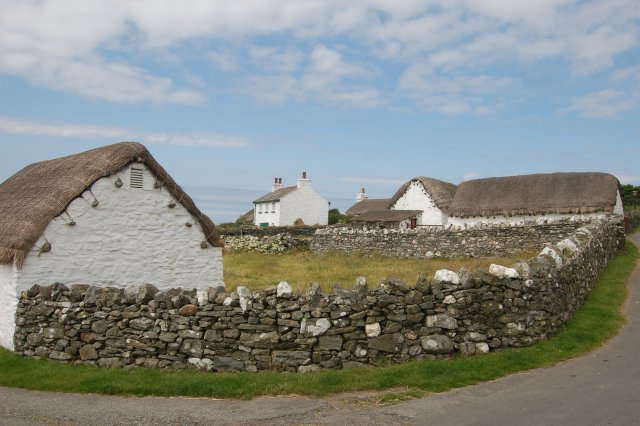
Thatched cottages

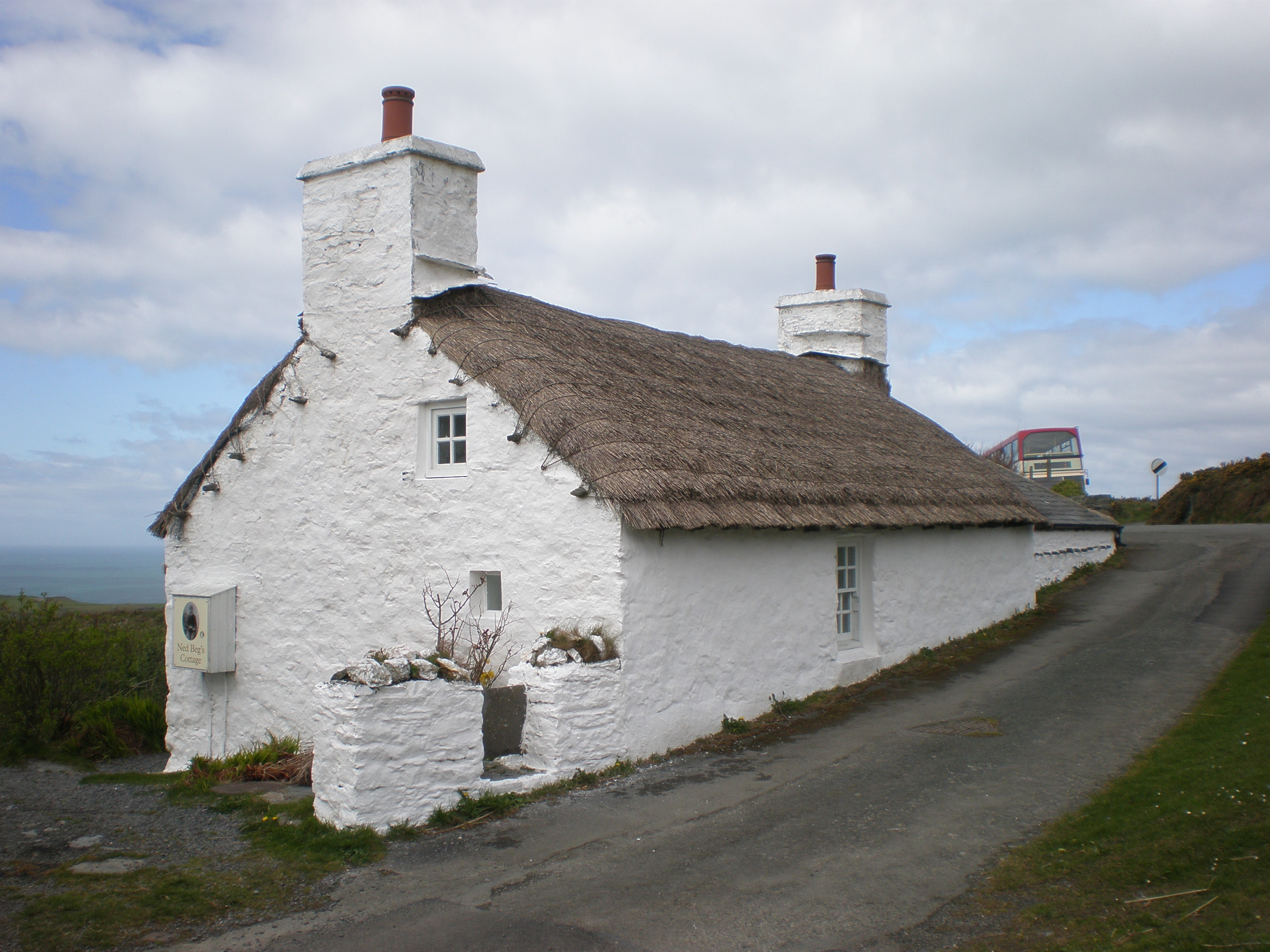
Ned Beg's House

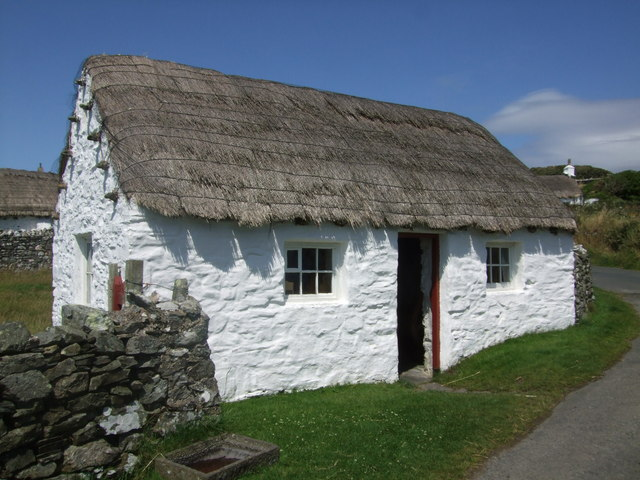
The Joiner's workshop

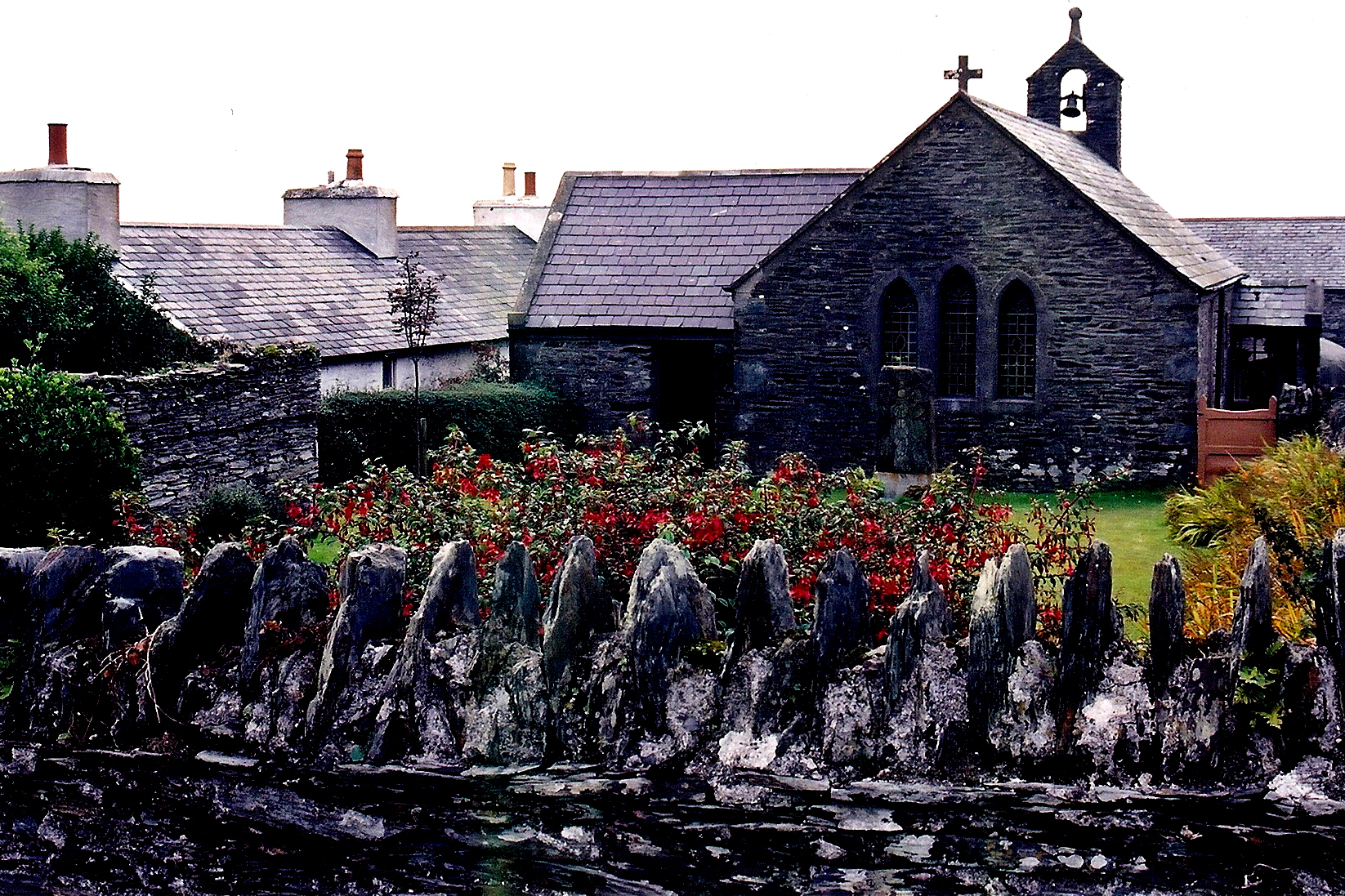
St. Peter's Church

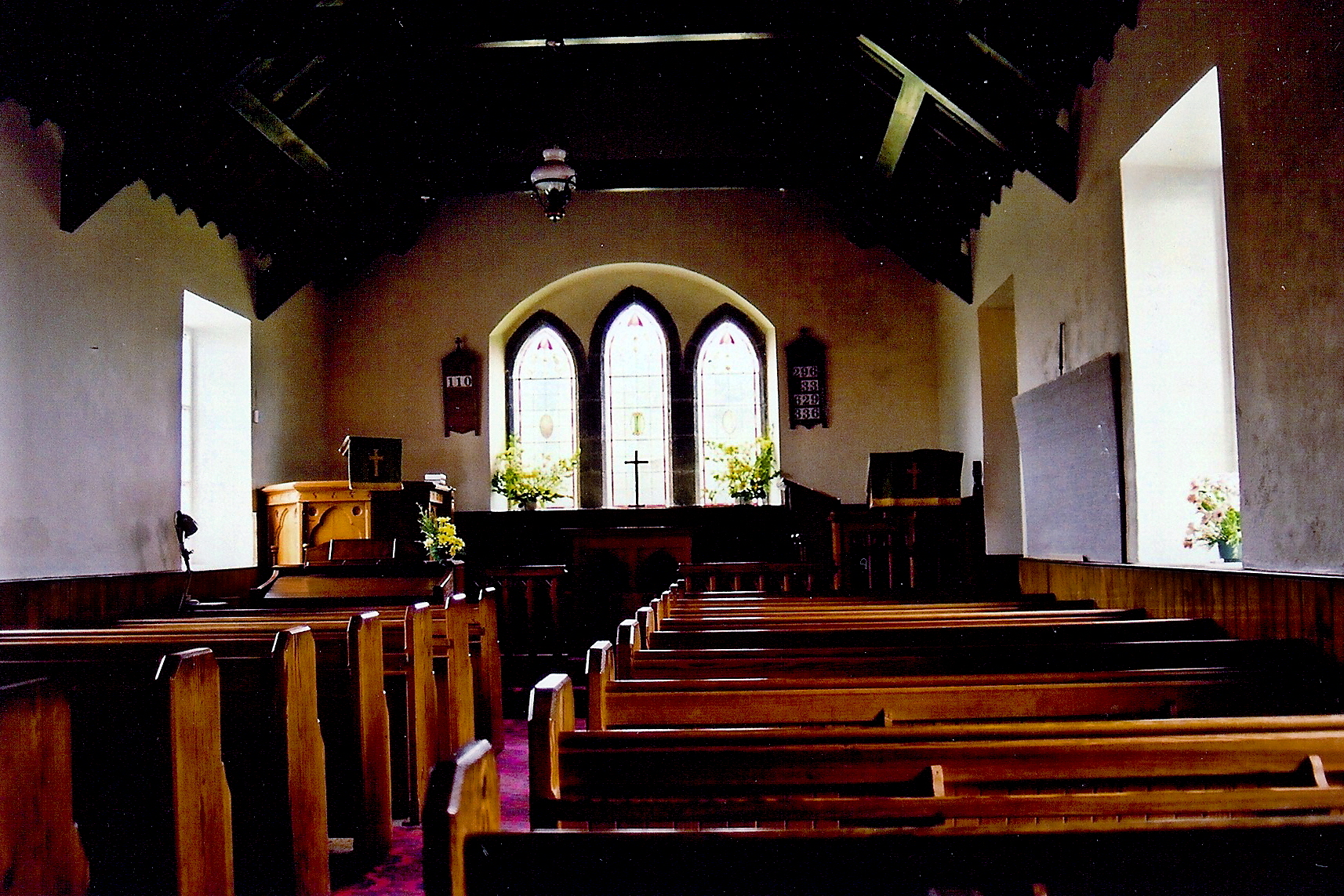
Interior of St. Peter's Church

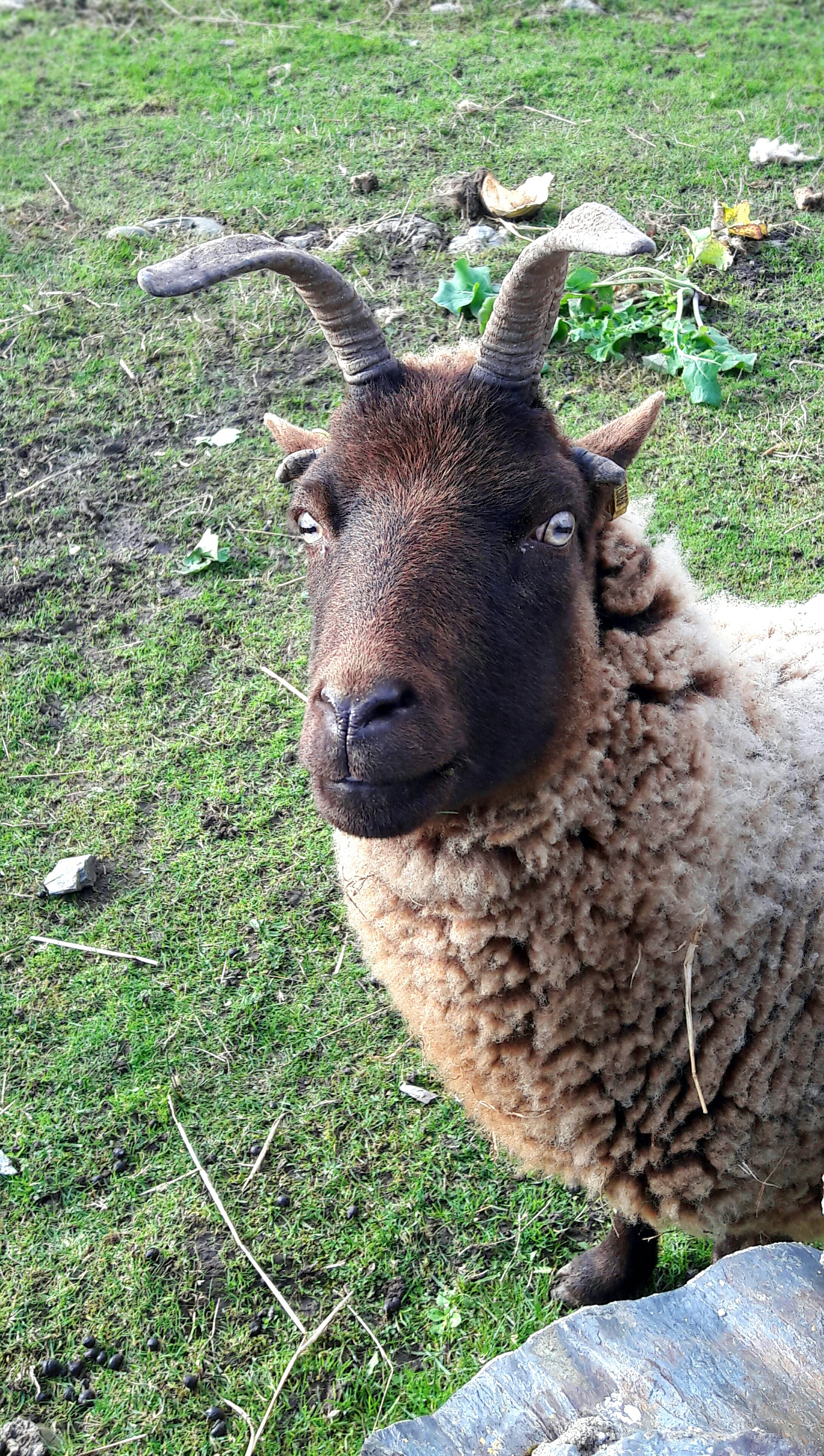
A Cregneash Loaghtan sheep

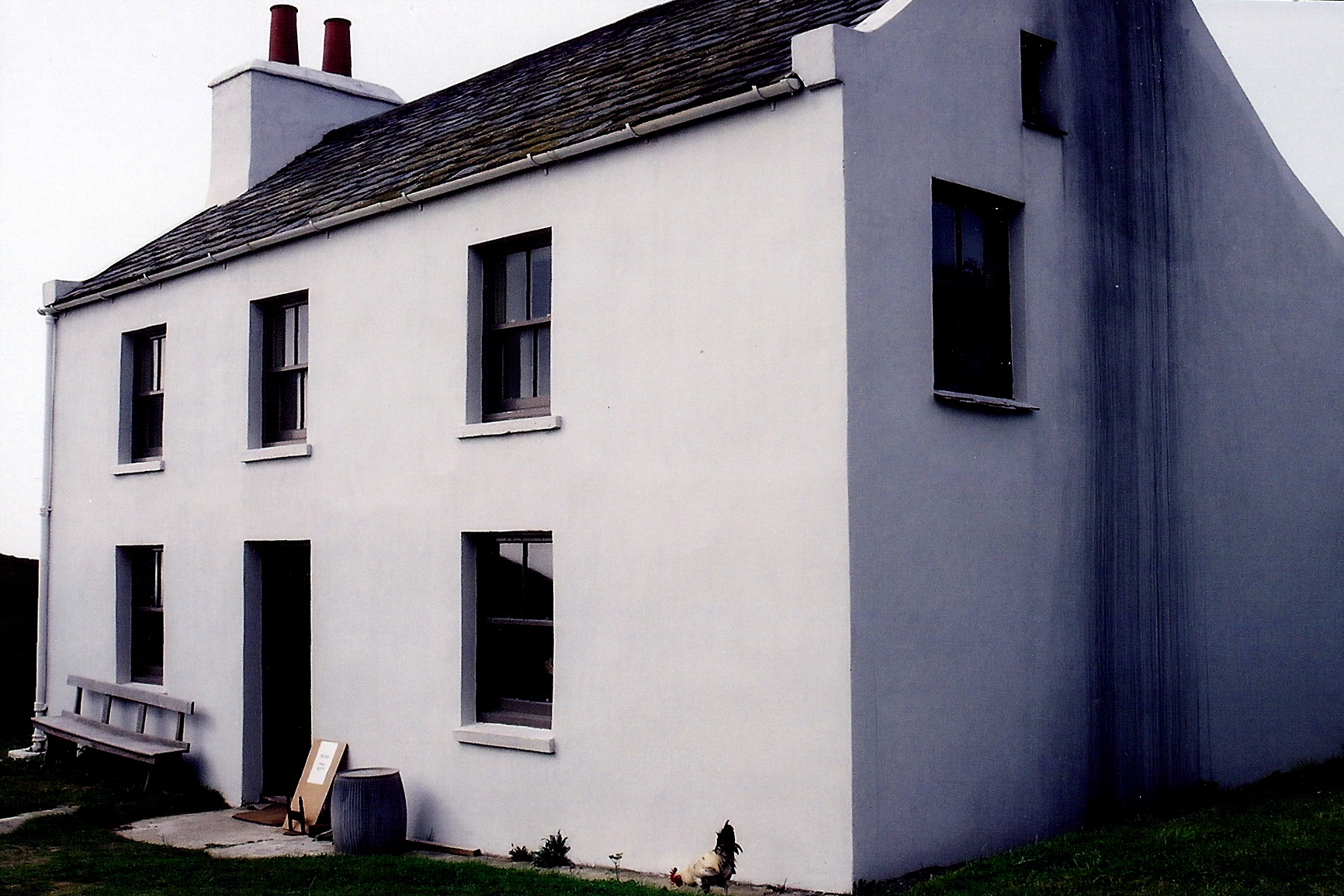
Church Farm House

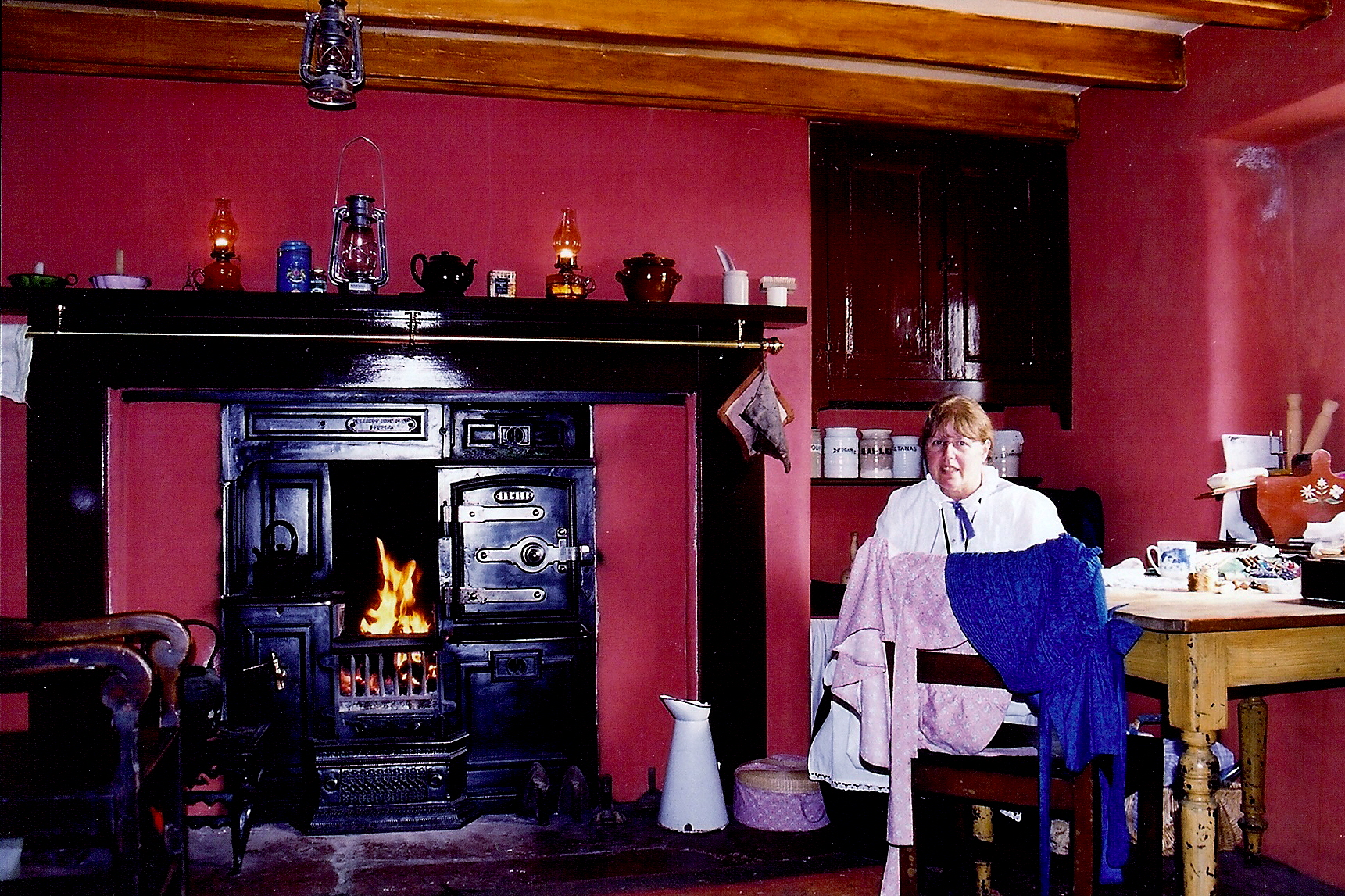
Cottage interior, Church Farm

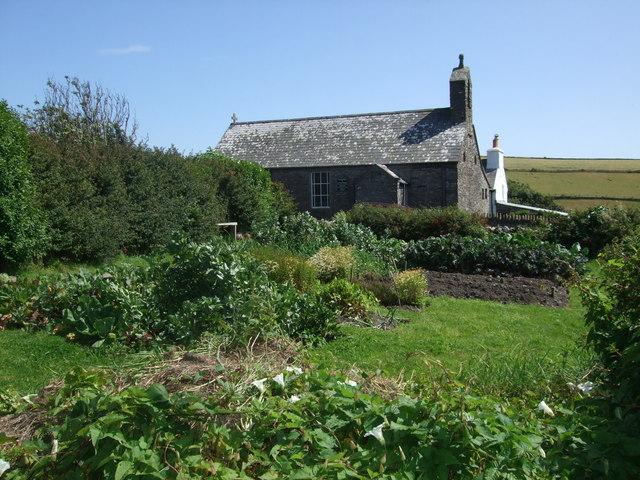
Manx Cottage Gardens
