= Ballaugh (parish) =

Parish on the Isle of Man

Coordinates: 54.310°N 4.542°E

Ballaugh: Manx: Skeerey Valley ny Loghey
- Parish of Ballaugh, Isle of Man
- Population: 1,041
- OS grid reference: SC3464693486
- Sheading: Michael
- Crown dependency: Isle of Man
- Post town: ISLE OF MAN
- Postcode district: IM7
- House of Keys: Ayre & Michael

Ballaugh (/bəˈlæf/ bə-LAF; Manx: Balley ny Loghey) is one of the seventeen parishes of the Isle of Man.

It is located on the west of the island (part of the traditional North Side division) in the sheading of Michael.

== Local government ==
For the purposes of local government, the whole of the historic parish forms a single parish district with Commissioners.

The Captain of the Parish (since 1993) is Charles Edgar Cowin.

== Politics ==
Ballaugh parish is part of the Ayre & Michael constituency, which elects two members to the House of Keys. Before 2016, it was in the Michael constituency.

== Geography ==
Ballaugh is a mainly agricultural district on the north-western coast of the island. Ballaugh runs for some 3 miles (5 km) along the north-west coastline of the island. The average breadth of the parish is about 3 miles (5 km) and it covers an area of around 9 square miles (23 km^{2}). The south-east corner is hilly and the remainder is low, including part of the marshy depression of the Curraghs. The only village in the parish is Ballaugh.

== History ==
There are in Ballaugh a number of sites of historical interest. There is a heritage group who holds regular meetings and arrange walks around the area. Research into the social history of the area, in particular the isolated Glen Dhoo, is being carried out. The name 'Ballaugh' derives from the Manx Balley-ny-Loghey or "the place of the lake" cognate with loch and lough. The Ballaugh Curraghs is all that remains of this lake. The lake, which measured up to a mile in length, was drained by the excavation about 300 years ago of the silted-up Lhen Trench which, during the last ice age, is believed to have been a meltwater channel flowing north to south from the melting ice front.

== Demographics ==
The Isle of Man census of 2016 returned a parish population of 1,032, a decrease of 1% from the figure of 1,042 in 2011.

Ballaugh parish (census)
Year	1996	2001	2006	2011	2016	2021
Pop.	812	868	1,042	1,042	1,032	1,041
±%	—	+6.9%	+20.0%	+0.0%	−1.0%	+0.9%

== Curraghs Wildlife Park and Ballaugh Curragh ==
One mile east of the village is Curraghs Wildlife Park, which was formerly run by the island's Department of Community, Culture and Leisure and is a haven for all sorts of wetland wildlife. Most of the park is laid out in geographical sections, representing different continents of the world and the animals that can be found there. The central part of the park has a different format and contains specific animal exhibits and visitor attractions.

The park is located next to Ballaugh Curragh wetland, the first wildlife site on the island to be internationally recognised, when in 2006, it was designated a Ramsar wetland of international importance. The site qualifies for international status as it has excellent examples of wetland habitats characteristic of the island and the region: bog pools, marshy grassland, birch woodland, modified bog and willow scrub (known as curragh). It also has on occasion, the largest number of winter roosting hen harriers in Western Europe and has a breeding habitat for a highly endangered migratory bird, the corn crake. In 2005, the Department of Agriculture, Fisheries and Forestry designated Ballaugh Curragh as an "Area of Special Scientific Interest". There are three partners involved in the Curragh: Curraghs Wildlife Park, Manx National Heritage and the Manx Wildlife Trust.
