= Archibald Cregeen =

Manx lexicographer and scholar

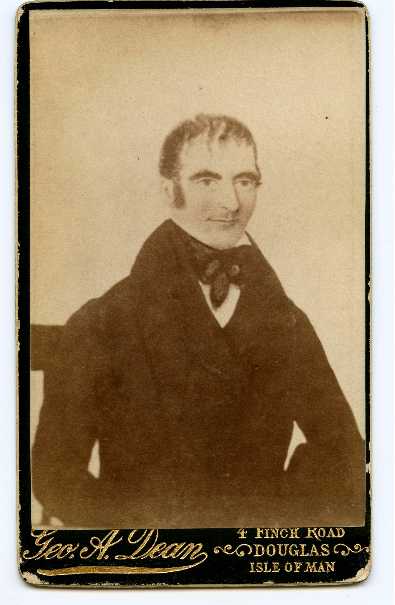
- Born: Arbory, Isle of Man
- Baptised: 20 November 1774
- Died: 9 April 1841 (aged 66–67); Arbory, Isle of Man
- Resting place: Arbory Churchyard, Isle of Man
- Occupations: Marble mason, Coroner, Lexicographer
- Notable work: A Dictionary of the Manks Language (1838)

Archibald Cregeen (baptised 20 November 1774 – 9 April 1841) was a Manx lexicographer and scholar. He is best known for compiling A Dictionary of the Manks Language (1838), which was the first dictionary for the Manx language to be published.

== Biography ==
Archibald Cregeen was born in late October or early November 1774, to Manx William Cregeen and his Irish wife Mary Fairclough in Colby on the Isle of Man. In 1798, he married Jane Crellin, and they had eight children. Shortly after his wedding, he built a small cottage near his father's in Colby and lived there with his family for the rest of his life. Although his father was a cooper by trade, Cregeen became a marble mason, engraving lettering on tombstones.

He was appointed coroner of Rushen Sheading in 1813. This was a position of considerable responsibility and influence in the local community, as the coroner held inquests of deaths, served summonses, and levied fines.

He died on 9 April 1841, aged 66 or 67. He was buried in St Columba, Arbory parish church in Ballabeg. His tomb has an inscription which describes him as having "lived respected and died lamented".

== Manx language ==
Manx is a member of the Goidelic language family, closely related to Irish and Scottish Gaelic. Cregeen himself was a native Manx speaker, as Manx was the community language for much of the island at that time. The language was first brought to the island by sailors, monks and traders from Ireland as they travelled to and from Britain. The language changed significantly due to the influence of Norse after the Viking invasion of the Isle of Man and its relative political isolation from the rest of the Gaelic speaking world in later centuries.

Cregeen was aware of the long and complicated history of the Manx language, describing the language as being "ancient" and "venerable for its antiquity". Despite this, Cregeen noted the negative attitudes towards it and the low-prestige nature of the language on the Isle of Man in the preface to his dictionary:

I am well aware that the utility or the following work will be variously appreciated by my brother Manksmen. Some will be disposed to deride the endeavour to restore vigour to a decaying language. Those who reckon the extirpation of the Manks a necessary step towards that general extension of the English, which they deem essential to the interest of the Isle of Man, will condemn every effort which seems likely to retard its extinction.

== Dictionary ==
Cregeen began work on the dictionary in 1814. He did not work completely alone, but was aided by several Manx clergymen, notably Reverend John Edward Harrison, a vicar of the parish of Jurby, who supplied him with additional information. Compiling the dictionary took Cregeen over 20 years of meticulous research, travelling throughout the island, visiting farms and cottages and collecting words, phrases, and proverbs from the people he met.

When the dictionary was ready for publication, Harrison wrote an introduction and the manuscript was brought to Manx printer John Quiggin for it to be printed. On the title page of the original edition, the publication date is 1835, although the dictionary was not published until 3 years later in 1838. This was because the title page was distributed as an advertisement in 1835 to gauge interest, and never updated when the dictionary actually went to print.

The dictionary was ordered in an unusual way for a language that undergoes initial mutation of words, in that it is strictly alphabetical, including entries for mutated forms:

Both the first edition of the Dictionary (1835) and the second (1910) comprise a strictly alphabetical list of word forms, which is particularly valuable for users not entirely familiar with the nature and range of variation in the initial letter of Manx words, due to initial consonant mutations, and to the addition of consonants (such as d- or n-) before certain forms of vowel-initial verbs. A consequence of this strictly alphabetical procedure, though, is that related forms of the same word, or word-family, are scattered throughout the dictionary. Thus, in a sense, Cregeen’s Dictionary as published is more like an index to a lexicon than a lexicon itself.

It is worth noting that Cregeen was not the first person to attempt to write a dictionary for the Manx language. Reverend John Kelly had attempted to do so in his A Triglot Dictionary of the Celtic Language, as spoken in Man, Scotland, and Ireland together with the English, but much of this was destroyed in a fire during publishing. Cregeen would not have been aware of this as although Kelly's dictionary was partially extant in manuscript form, it was not published until decades later in 1866.

== Legacy ==
Although the Manx language was in a period of decline even in Cregeen's own lifetime, his contribution was not forgotten. The centenary of the publication of his dictionary was celebrated in Peel in 1938, with William Cubbon, the director of the Manx Museum, stating that "we students would be poor without his precious book". In 1939, a commemorative plaque was erected over the door of the house that Cregeen himself built in Colby.

In more recent years, with the continued revival of the language in the Isle of Man, Culture Vannin has celebrated Cregeen's work by selecting some of the lesser known words from his dictionary and posting them on social media.
