= Mull Hill =

Hill on the Isle of Man, England

Meayll Hill
- Cronk Meayll
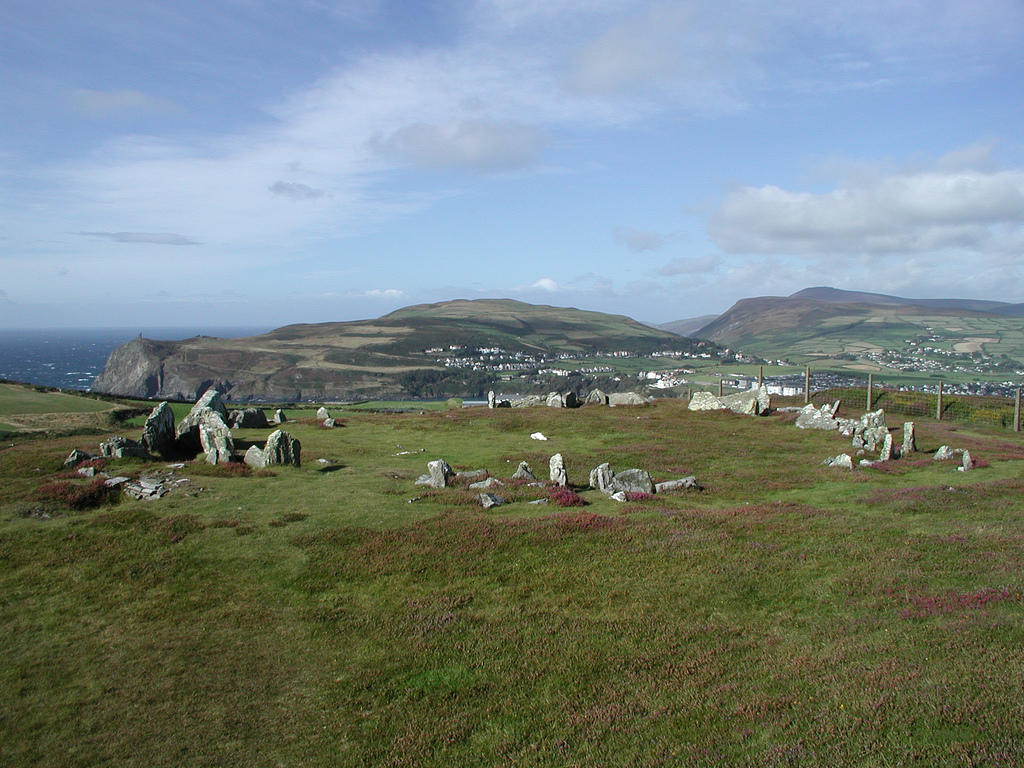
- Meayll Circle on top of Meayll Hill, looking north towards Port Erin

Highest point
- Elevation: 169 m (554 ft)
- Prominence: c. 154 m
- Listing: Marilyn
- Coordinates: 54°04′27″N 4°46′07″W

Geography
- Location: Rushen, Isle of Man
- OS grid: SC189676
- Topo map(s): OS Landranger 95; IOM Outdoor Leisure Map (S)

Meayll Hill (Manx: Cronk Meayll; also called The Mull) is a small hill in the exclave of Rushen parish at the southern end of the Isle of Man, just outside the village of Cregneash. It is the site of a chambered cairn called Meayll Circle or Mull Circle. Near the summit of the hill also lie the remains of a World War II Chain Home Low RDF station.

Meayll Hill Stone Circle is a unique archaeological monument. It consists of twelve burial chambers placed in a ring, with six entrance passages each leading into a pair of chambers. Sherds of ornate pottery, charred bones, flint tools and white quartz pebbles have been found in the burial chambers. It was built around 3500 BC; it is a site of legends, with diverse stories about haunting.

The word Meayll means "bald" in Manx Gaelic.

== Meayll Circle ==
The Stone Circle and artifacts

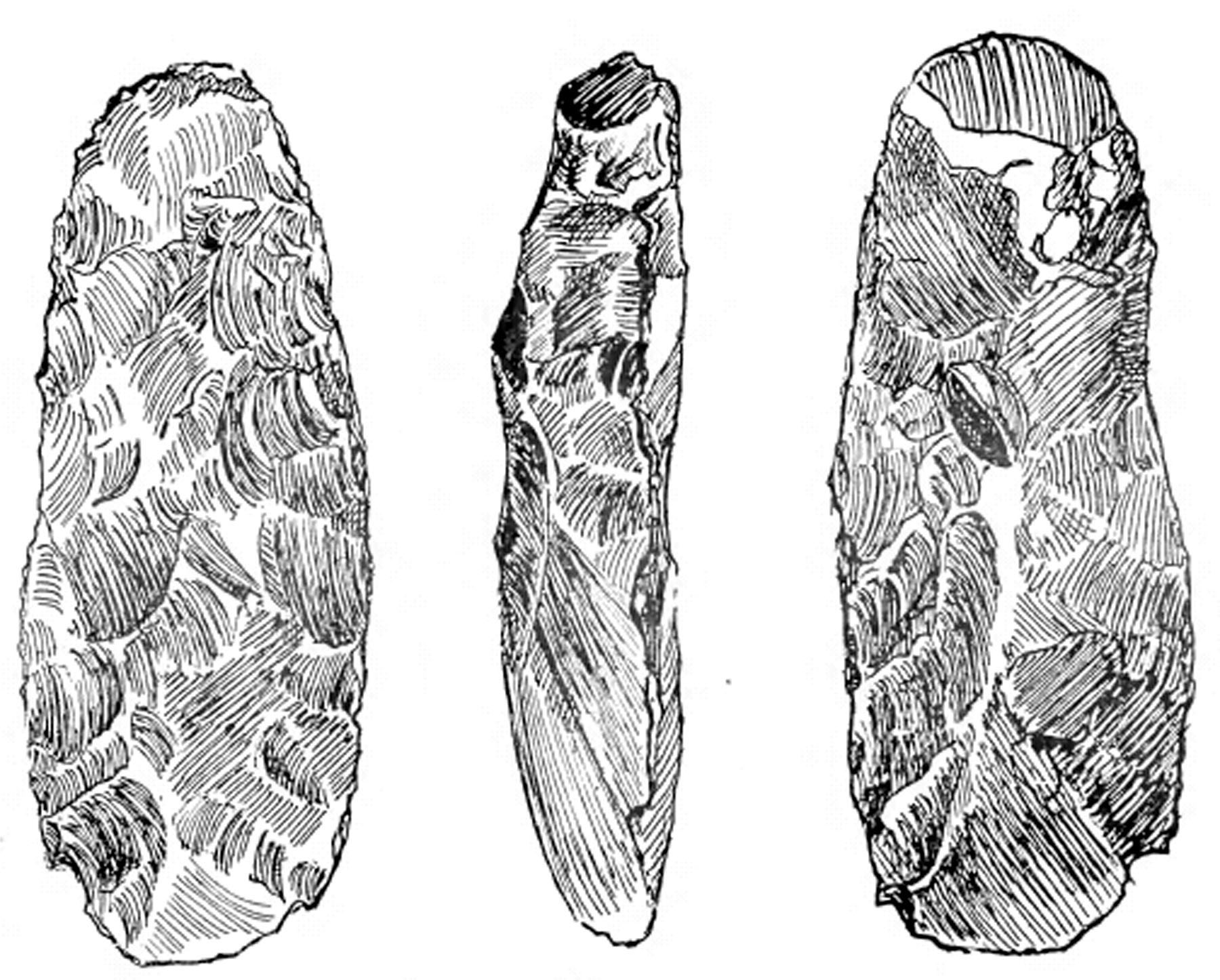
Three views of an adze, from Meayll Hill

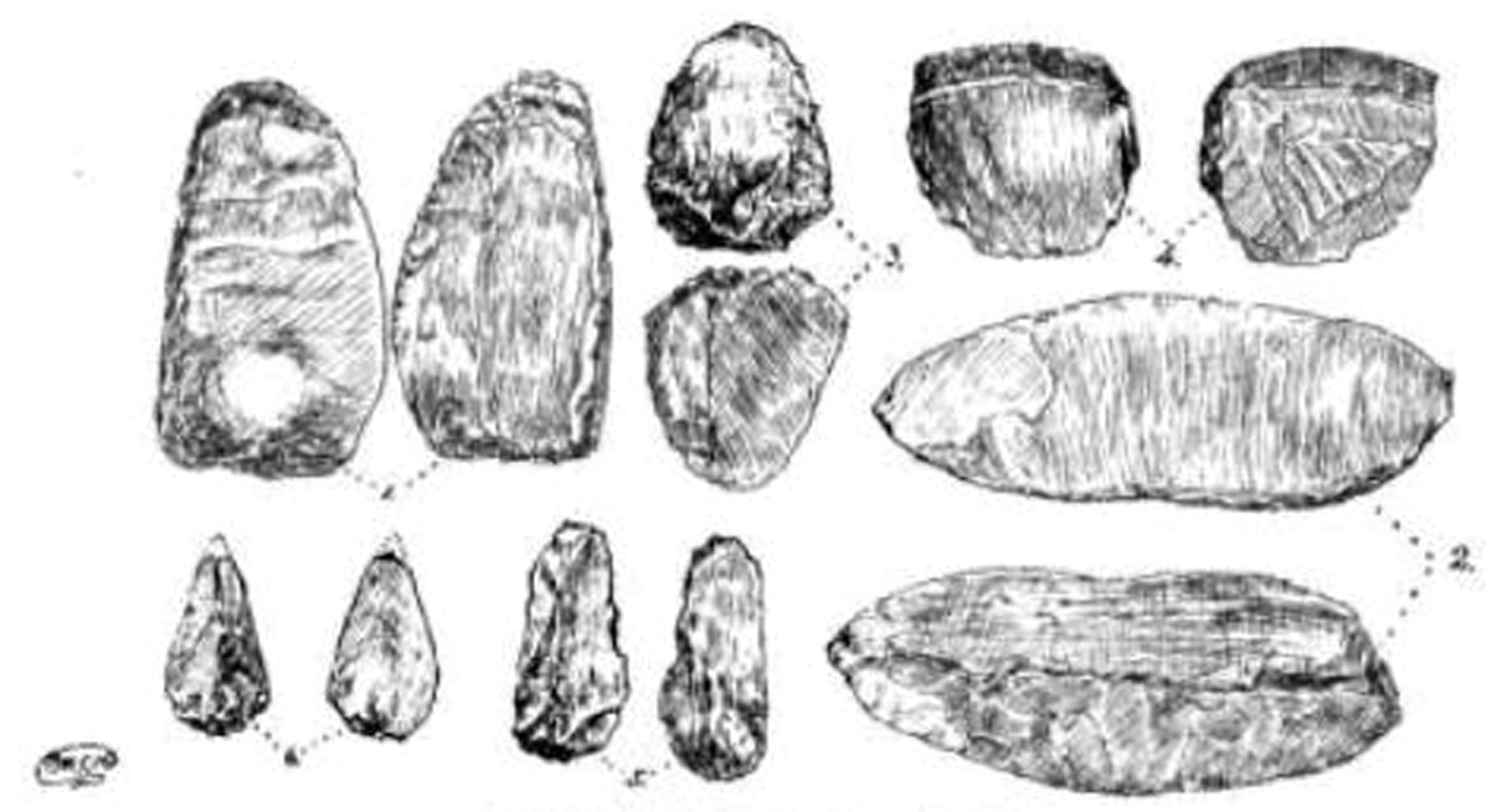
Worked flints found on Meayll Hill

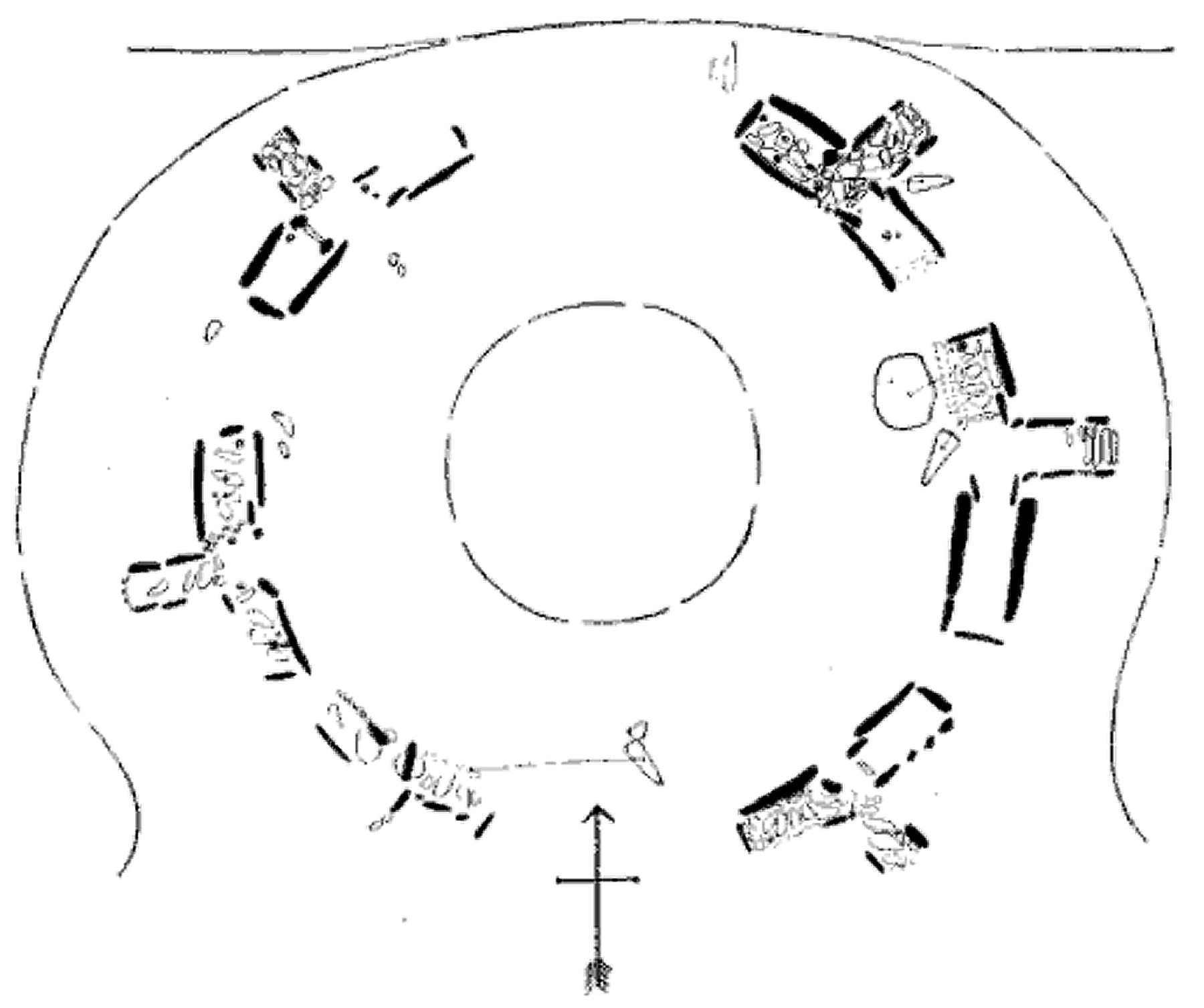
Plan of the Meayll Stone Circle

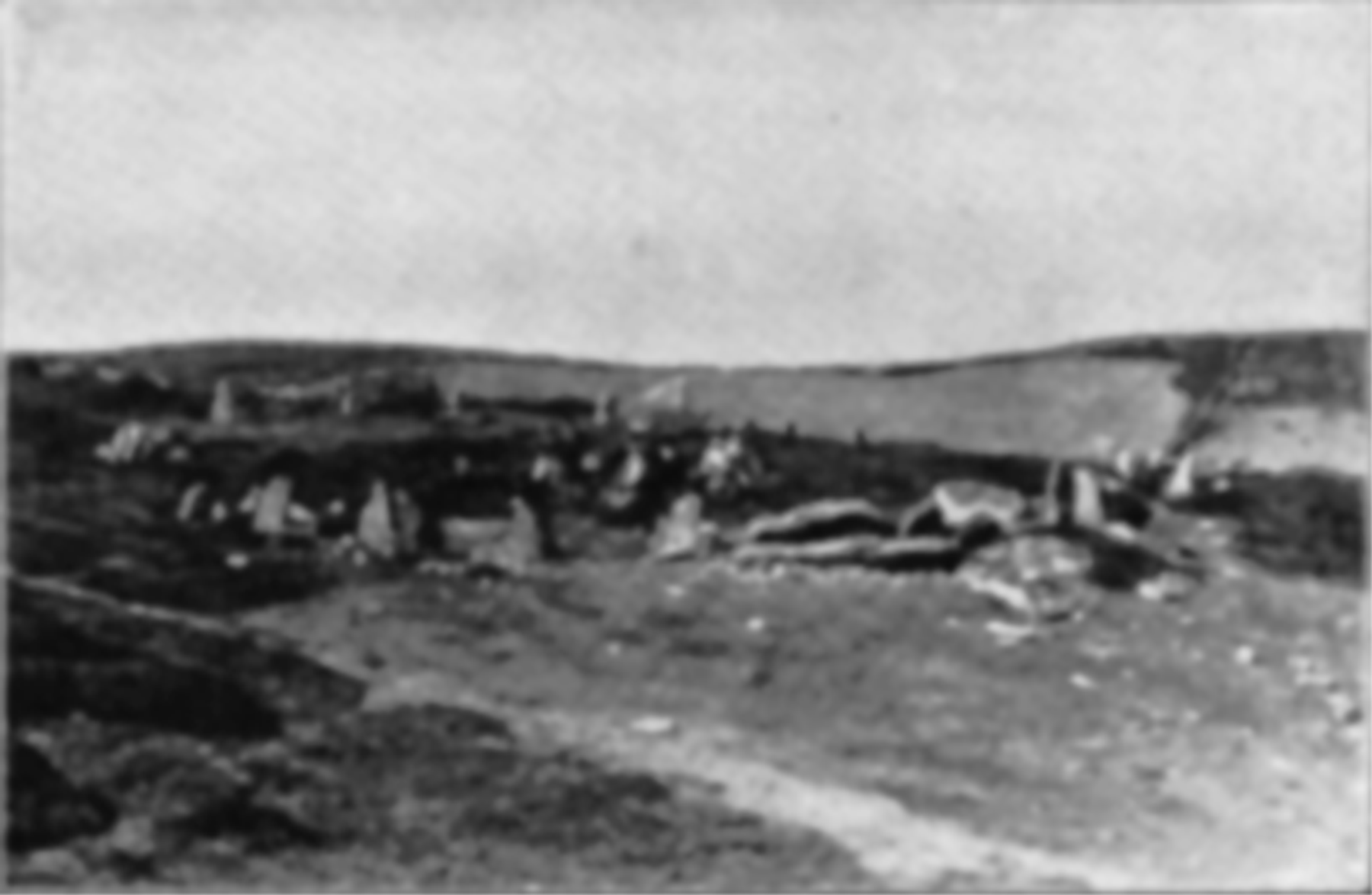
Meayll Stone Circle from the east

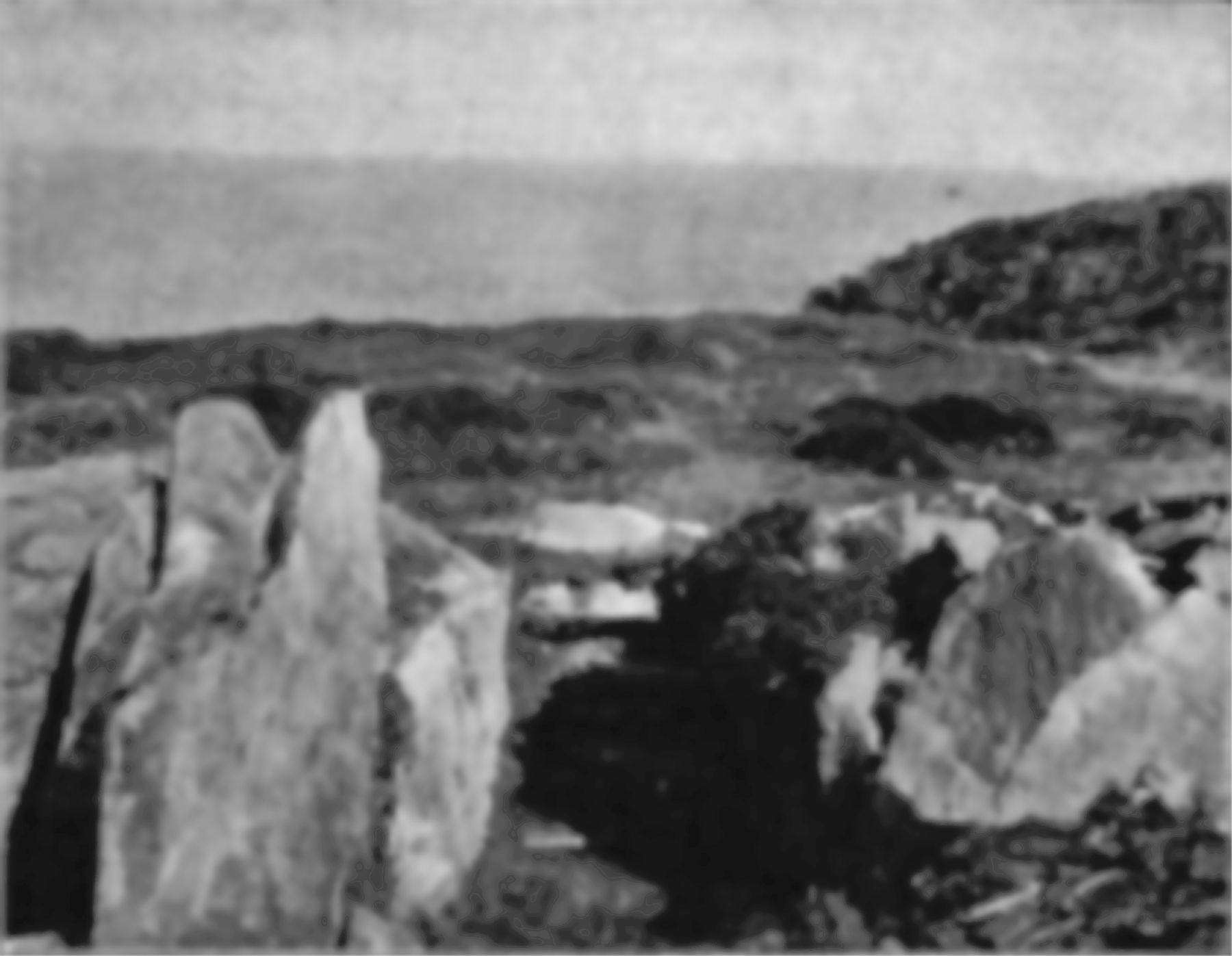
Meayll Stone Circle, excavated cist

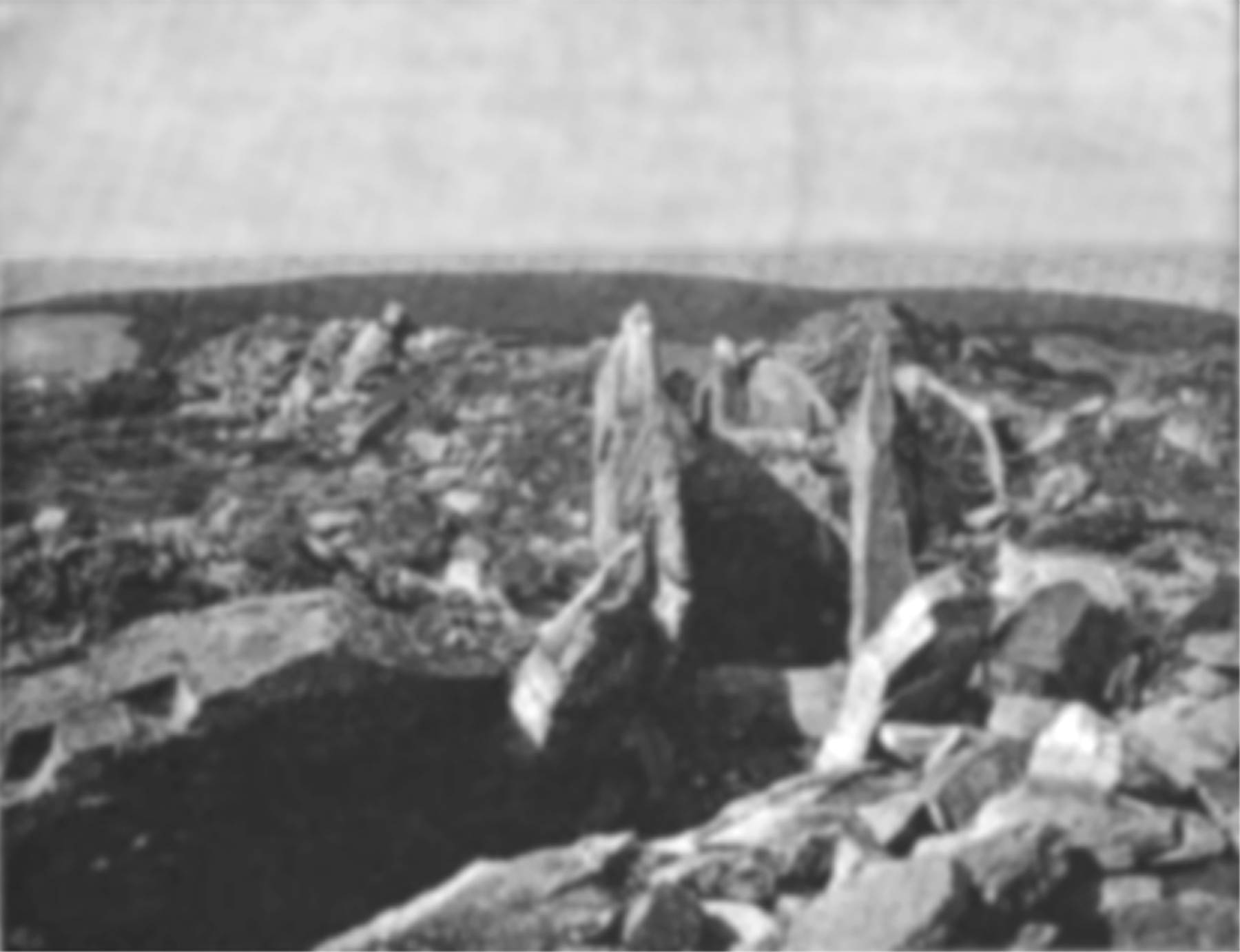
Meayll Stone Circle, excavated cist (another view)
