= Arbory and Rushen =

Local authority in the Isle of Man

Arbory and Rushen (Cairbre as Rosien) is a local authority area in the south-west of the Isle of Man, designated as a parish district, and with its own parish commissioners. It was created in 2020 by the merger of the former parishes of Arbory and Rushen; each of those two are now electoral wards within the combined parish which elect three commissioners.

The district is rural in character; it is the largest in area in the south of the island, and includes one exclave, including Cregneash, separated from the rest of the district by Port Erin. It also includes the Calf of Man.

The local authority area is split between two Keys constituencies: Arbory, Castletown and Malew; and Rushen.
