= Glenfaba =

Sheading of the Isle of Man

Glenfaba Glion Faba
- Sheading
- Sheading of Glenfaba
- Crown dependency: Isle of Man
- Parishes: German, Patrick
- Town: Peel

Area
  - Total: 89.20 km^{2} (34.44 sq mi)
  - Rank: 4

Population (2021)
  - Total: 8,253
  - Density: 92.52/km^{2} (239.6/sq mi)

Glenfaba (/ɡlɛnˈfeɪbə/ glen-FAY-bə; Manx: Glion Faba) is one of the six sheadings of the Isle of Man.

It is located on the west of the island (part of the traditional North Side division) and consists of the two historic parishes of German and Patrick. It includes the town of Peel and, from 1796 till 1986, also included the parish of Marown.

Other settlements in the sheading include St John's in the parish of German (home of the Tynwald Day ceremony), and Dalby, Foxdale, Glen Maye and Niarbyl (all in the parish of Patrick).

== Toponymy ==
The first mention of Glenfaba may be recorded in a bull of Pope Gregory IX in 1231. The origin of the name is not known, but may be connected with that of the river Neb. Neb and/or -faba might have pre-Celtic origins. Most of the place names in the sheading are Gaelic, with 18 Norse names remaining, suggesting a mostly Celtic-derived population and influence.

== MHKs and elections ==
Until 2016, Glenfaba was also a House of Keys constituency, electing one MHK. From 2016 it is part of the Glenfaba & Peel constituency.

Year	Election	Turnout	Candidates
Information on unsuccessful candidates not generally available
This table is materially incomplete
1867	General Election		John Stevenson Moore (elected)
1892	General Election		John Quayle (elected)
1892	By-Election		Thomas Kneen (elected unopposed)
Death of John Joughin
1901	By-Election		Captain William Kitto (elected unopposed)
1903	General Election		William Quayle (elected unopposed); Peter Cadman (elected unopposed); William Kitto (elected unopposed)
1908	General Election		Richard Barton Quirk (elected)
1916	By-Election		Edward Callister (elected)
1917	By-Election		Frank Dagleish (elected)
1919	General Election		Frank Dagleish (elected); Edward Callister (elected)
1924	By-Election		John Thomas Quilliam JP (elected)
1924	General Election		Frank Dagleish (elected); William Philip Clucas (elected); John Thomas Quilliam (elected)
1929	By-Election		Robert Kneen (elected)
1929	General Election		Frank Dagleish (elected); Robert Kneen (elected); William Philip Clucas (elected)
By-election called due to the death of William Philip Clucas.
1933	By-Election		James Clinton (elected)
1934	General Election		James Clinton (elected); Robert Kneen (elected)
The status of the following is unclear
1908	General Election	?	Thomas Kermode, 313 votes, elected; Richard Quirk, 462 votes, elected; William Kitto, 598 votes, elected
1946	General Election		Ffinlo Corkhill (elected)
1951	General Election		Ffinlo Corkhill (elected)
1956	General Election		Ffinlo Corkhill (elected)
1962	General Election		Hugh Macleod; Ffinlo Corkhill; Henry Corlett SHK
1966	General Election		Ian Anderson (elected)
1971	General Election		Ian Anderson (elected)
1976	General Election	?	Ian Anderson (elected); Walter Gilbey (not elected)
1981	General Election	?	Ian Anderson (elected); Walter Gilbey (not elected)
Called following the elevation of Ian Anderson to the Legislative Council.
1982	By Election		Walter Gilbey (elected)
1986	General Election		Walter Gilbey (elected unopposed)
1991	General Election	75.1%	Walter Gilbey (625 votes, elected); Robert Quayle (485 votes); G Joughin (111 votes)
1996	General Election	63.4%	Walter Gilbey (743 votes, elected); Toni Collister (312 votes)
2001	General Election	71.1%	David Anderson, 697 votes, elected; Walter Gilbey, 374 votes; Alan Kermode, 205 votes
2006	General Election		David Anderson, 760 votes, elected; Geoffrey Boot, 529 votes

In 2016 the constituency was abolished.

== See also ==
- Local government in the Isle of Man
