= German (parish) =

Parish on the Isle of Man

Coordinates: 54.235°N 4.607°W

German: Manx: Carmane
- Parish of German, Isle of Man
- Population: 1,056
- OS grid reference: SC301853
- Sheading: Glenfaba
- Crown dependency: Isle of Man
- Post town: ISLE OF MAN
- Postcode district: IM5
- House of Keys: Glenfaba & Peel

German (Manx: Carmane) is one of the seventeen historic parishes of the Isle of Man. It is located on the west of the island (part of the traditional North Side division) in the sheading of Glenfaba.

== History ==
German parish was named after Saint Germanus. Administratively, part of the historic parish of German is now covered by part of the town of Peel. Other settlements in the parish include St John's, home of the Tynwald Day ceremony. It became traditional for German to annually light a beacon on The Green at St John's to celebrate the birthday of the British Monarch as the Lord of Mann.

== Local government ==
For the purposes of local government, the majority of the area of the historic parish forms a single parish district with Commissioners. Since 1884, an area in the west of the historic parish of German has been part of the separate town of Peel, with its own town Commissioners. The Captain of the Parish (since 2015) is Allen Charles Corlett. German parish is part of the Glenfaba & Peel constituency, which elects two Members to the House of Keys. Before 2016 the majority of the historic parish was in the Glenfaba constituency, and from 1867 until 2016 Peel formed its own constituency before merging with Glenfaba.

== Geography ==
It is a mainly hilly area, apart from a small coastal plain near Peel. The plain is considered to have fertile farmland. In the valley between St John's and Greeba is a marshland that is susceptible to flooding. The Isle of Man census of 2016 returned a parish population of 966 for German, a decrease of 6% from the figure of 1,024 in 2011. 44 residents (4.3%) were able to read, write, and speak Manx Gaelic at the time of the 2011 census.

== Demographics ==
German (census)
Year	1996	2001	2006	2011	2016	2021
Pop.	1,038	1,010	995	1,024	966	1,056
±%	—	−2.7%	−1.5%	+2.9%	−5.7%	+9.3%

== Sources ==
- Manxnotebook German. Detail about Manx parishes and description of the parish.
- Manxnotebook - German with full description of the parish and photographs
- Manxnotebook Kirk German Antiquities
- Isle of Man Building Control Districts showing parish boundaries
- Glenology - Manx Glens. An ongoing study of Manx glens, their locations and meanings.
