= Bride (parish) =

Parish on the Isle of Man

Coordinates: 54.368°N 4.378°W

Bride: Manx: Breeshey
- Parish of Bride, Isle of Man
- Population: 382
- OS grid reference: SC4553099565
- Sheading: Ayre & Michael
- Crown dependency: Isle of Man
- Post town: ISLE OF MAN
- Postcode district: IM7
- House of Keys: Ayre & Michael

Bride (Manx: Breeshey) is one of the seventeen parishes of the Isle of Man.

It is located in the north of the island (part of the traditional North Side division) in the sheading of Ayre.

== Local government ==
For the purposes of local government, the whole of the historic parish forms a single parish district with Commissioners.

The Captain of the Parish (since 2025) is John James Teare.

== Politics ==
Bride parish is part of the Ayre & Michael constituency, which elects two Members to the House of Keys. Before 2016 it was in the Ayre constituency.

== Geography ==
The parish, named after St Brigid, lies to the east of Andreas and to the north of Lezayre, bordering the sea to the north and east. It covers an area of about 9 square miles (23 km^{2}) and contains the village of Bride or Kirk Bride.

== Demographics ==
The Isle of Man census of 2021 returned a parish population of 359, a decrease of 6% from the figure of 382 in 2016 and a decrease of 10% from the figure of 401 in 2011. This means that Bride is easily the lowest-populated administrative area on the island. The parish has the highest proportion of Manx Gaelic speakers on the island (4.49%), according to the 2011 census.

Bride (census)
Year	1996	2001	2006	2011	2016	2021
Pop.	405	408	418	400	382	359
±%	—	+0.7%	+2.5%	−4.3%	−4.5%	−6.0%

== Topography ==
There is a range of sandhills crossing the parish from west to Point Cranstal (not actually a point) in the east, from which a good view may be obtained of the Manx mountains as well as of the Scottish and Cumbrian mountains (with the Solway Firth in between). Otherwise the parish is flat and low-lying. The Galloway coast is about 18 miles (29 km) away. At the Point of Ayre is a 100 feet (30 m) lighthouse. On old maps Point Cranstal is named as "Shellag Point" and a hamlet named Cranstal is marked close to it, but this has long since disappeared.

== Telegraph cable ==
The first Isle of Man submarine telegraph cable to the mainland was laid from Cranstal to St Bees on the Cumberland coast in 1859. Due to damage from tidal currents the cable was later moved to Port Cornaa.
