= Patrick (parish) =

Parish on the Isle of Man

Coordinates: 54.152°N 4.673°W

Patrick: Manx: Perick
- Parish of Patrick, Isle of Man
- Population: 1,576
- OS grid reference: SC255762
- Sheading: Glenfaba
- Crown dependency: Isle of Man
- Post town: ISLE OF MAN
- Postcode district: IM5
- House of Keys: Glenfaba & Peel

Patrick (Manx: Perick) is one of the seventeen historic parishes of the Isle of Man.

It is located on the west of the island (part of the traditional North Side division) in the sheading of Glenfaba.

Administratively, a small part of the area of the historic parish of Patrick is now covered by part of the town of Peel.

Other settlements in the parish include Dalby, Foxdale, Glen Maye and Niarbyl.

== Local government ==
For the purposes of local government, the majority of the area of the historic parish forms a single parish district with Commissioners.

Since 1884, a small area in the north of the historic parish of Patrick has been part of the administratively separate town of Peel, with its own town Commissioners.

The Captain of the Parish (since 2010) is Patricia Costain.

== Politics ==
Patrick parish is part of the Glenfaba & Peel constituency, which elects two Members to the House of Keys. Before 2016 the majority of the historic parish was in the Glenfaba constituency, and from 1867 until 2016 Peel formed its own constituency.

== Geography ==
The parish is bounded by Peel in the north, German in the north and east, Marown to the east, Malew to the south-east, Arbory and Rushen to the south, and the Irish Sea to the west. The parish is a mainly hilly area including the northern slopes of the South Barrule; Slieau Whallian; and to the west, Dalby Mountain. Glen Rushen is located between Dalby Mountain and the South Barrule, and leads downwards to Glen Mooar and finally Glen Maye. Through these glens flows the Glenmaye river, with the Glenmaye waterfall, about one mile from the coast. There are disused slate quarries in Glen Rushen. In common with other hilly areas of the island, there are several forest plantations.

The coastal strip, roughly that to the west of the A27 road, is flatter agricultural land.

The population was historically partly agricultural, fishing, and mining. Now it is sparsely distributed over the parish: there are four small villages, Dalby near the coast on the west side of Dalby Mountain, Foxdale, a former mining village, Patrick in the north, and Glen Maye, near the coast and home to the glen of the same name. The parish also includes the southern part of the village of St John's.

The parish forms part of the ecclesiastical (Anglican) Parish of the West Coast.

== Demographics ==
The Isle of Man census of 2016 returned a parish population of 1,576, an increase of 3.1% from the figure of 1,527 in 2011.

Patrick (census)
Year	1996	2001	2006	2011	2016	2021
Pop.	1,198	1,305	1,294	1,527	1,576	1,487
±%	—	+8.9%	−0.8%	+18.0%	+3.2%	−5.6%
