= Jonathan Joughin =

Manx politician

Jonathan Joughin MHK was a Member of the House of Keys for Douglas East in the Member of the Select Committee of Tynwald on Planning and Building Control.

He was elected for Douglas East in the 2015 by-election. He was not re-elected in subsequent 2016 General Election.
