= Rushen (sheading) =

Sheading of the Isle of Man

Rushen Rosien
- Sheading
- Sheading of Rushen
- Coordinates: 54°07′01″N 4°40′44″W
- Crown dependency: Isle of Man
- Parishes: Arbory, Malew, Rushen
- Town: Castletown
- Village districts: Port Erin, Port St Mary

Area
  - Total: 95.70 km^{2} (36.95 sq mi)
  - Rank: 3

Population (2021)
  - Total: 14,852
  - Density: 155.2/km^{2} (401.9/sq mi)

Rushen (/ˈrʊʃən/ RUUSH-ən; Manx: Rosien) is one of the six sheadings of the Isle of Man.

It is located in the south of the island (part of the traditional South Side division) and consists of the three historic parishes of Arbory, Malew and (Kirk Christ) Rushen.

Administratively, the sheading of Rushen also includes the town of Castletown and the village districts of Port Erin and Port St Mary.

Other settlements in the sheading include Ballabeg, Colby and Ronague (all in the parish of Arbory), Ballasalla, Derbyhaven and St Mark's (all in the parish of Malew), and Cregneash in the parish of Rushen.

== Toponymy ==
The meaning of the name Rushen is uncertain but likely Norse in origin, which is less common in this part of the island. Speculated meanings include "wood" or "peninsula", which would reference Langness Peninsula. Rushen sheading is first recorded by the monks of Rushen Abbey in The Chronicle of Mann and the Isles (1134) as "Russin".

== MHKs and elections ==
Since 2016, when it was reduced from a three-member seat to a two-member seat, the House of Keys constituency of Rushen covers the historical parish of Rushen (as above) with some minor departures from the historical parish boundary.

== See also ==
- Local government in the Isle of Man
