= Malew =

Parish on the Isle of Man

Coordinates: 54°07′N 4°38′W

Malew: Manx: Skeerey Valew
- Parish of Malew, Isle of Man
- Population: 2,385
- OS grid reference: SC2756570420
- Sheading: Rushen
- Crown dependency: Isle of Man
- Post town: ISLE OF MAN
- Postcode district: IM9
- House of Keys: Arbory, Castletown & Malew

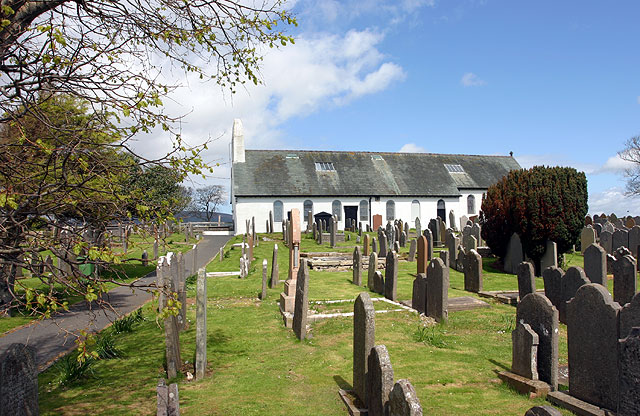
Malew Church

Malew (/məˈluː/ mə-LOO; Manx: Malew) is one of the seventeen parishes of the Isle of Man.

It is located in the south of the Island (part of the traditional South Side division) in the sheading of Rushen.

Administratively, part of the historic parish of Malew is now covered by the town of Castletown. As a result, there is a small exclave of the parish district which includes Scarlett point.

Other settlements in the parish include Ballasalla, Derbyhaven and St Mark's.

== History ==
It is named after the Celtic saint, Malew, also known as Saint Moluag, whose feast day is 25 June.

== Geography ==
Malew parish covers an area from Langness Peninsula and Scarlett up to Foxdale. The area includes both Ronaldsway and Balthane industrial estates and the Isle of Man Airport.

The parish is bordered on the east by Castletown and Santon Burn; on the north by the Granite Mountain and the South Barrule; by an irregular line from the South Barrule to Poyll Vaaish on the west; and by the sea on the south. It contains about 15 square miles (39 km^{2}). Most of the parish is low and undulating, forming much of the southern plain of the Island. The northern portion is more hilly, including the South Barrule, the highest point of the south of the Island at 483 metres (1,585 ft). The Silver Burn river rises near the South Barrule and flows under the Monks Bridge at Ballasalla, reaching the sea at Castletown harbour.

The coast line is low, but rocky and dangerous. Castletown Bay is a deep but exposed and dangerous inlet between Langness and Scarlett. The headlands are Dreswick Point and Langness Point, the two southern extremities of Langness peninsula; and Scarlett Point, a conical mass of sub-columnar basalt. At the northern end of Langness is St Michael's Isle.

The district is chiefly agricultural. Near the village of Ballasalla are the ruins of Rushen Abbey, founded in 1098, and dissolved late in the reign of Elizabeth I of England, and an ancient packhorse bridge over the Silver Burn, called the Crossag, or Monk's Bridge, too narrow for vehicles. Derbyhaven is a tiny hamlet on an isthmus, with a natural harbour, protected by a small breakwater. St Mark's, in the north of the parish, is a small agricultural village clustered round a chapel of ease.

== Demographics ==
The Isle of Man census of 2016 returned a parish population of 2,167, a decrease of 10% from the figure of 2,385 in 2011.

Malew (census)
Year	1996	2001	2006	2011	2016	2021
Pop.	2,140	2,262	2,304	2,385	2,167	2,367
±%	—	+5.7%	+1.9%	+3.5%	−9.1%	+9.2%

== Politics ==
Malew parish is part of the Arbory, Castletown & Malew constituency, which elects two Members to the House of Keys. From 1986 until 2016 the majority of the historic parish was in the Malew and Santon constituency, and before 1986 it was in the Rushen constituency. From 1867 until 2016 Castletown formed its own constituency.

== Local government ==
For the purposes of local government, most of the historic parish forms a single parish district with five elected Commissioners.

Since 1883, an area in the south of the historic parish of Malew has formed the separately administered town of Castletown, with its own town commissioners.

The Captain of the Parish (since 1996) is Roy H. Gelling.

== Economy ==
The former Manx Airlines had its head office on the grounds of Isle of Man Airport. BA Connect (BA CitiExpress) had an engineering base in Ronaldsway, employing 110 people. After Flybe acquired BA Connect, Flybe announced that it would discontinue the base.
