= John Joughin =

John Joughin is a British literary scholar, specialising in Shakespearean studies, and the ex Vice-Chancellor of the University of East London.

== See also ==
- List of Chancellors and Vice-Chancellors of British universities
