= Rushen (constituency) =

House of Keys constituency of the Isle of Man

Coordinates: 54°07′01″N 4°40′44″W

Rushen (House of Keys)
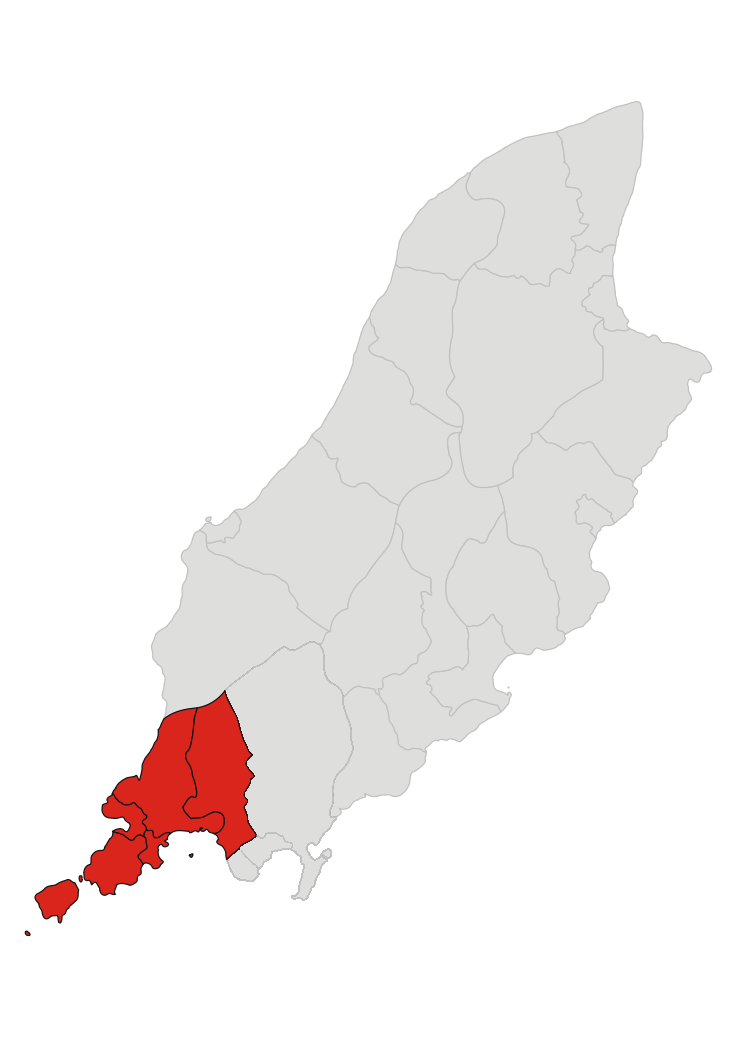

Rushen (Manx: Rosien) is a House of Keys constituency in the south of the Isle of Man which incorporates most of the parish of Rushen together with the village districts of Port Erin and Port St Mary.

Until 2016 the constituency covered the whole of the sheading of Rushen except for the parish of Malew and the town of Castletown, and elected three MHKs. (Malew was removed from the constituency in 1986.)

In 2016 the constituency boundaries were redrawn. This constituency lost the parish of Arbory and a small part of the parish of Rushen and now consists of most of the parish of Rushen, plus the village districts of Port Erin and Port St Mary. It now elects two MHKs.

== MHKs & Elections ==
This information is incomplete.

Year	Election	Turnout	Candidates
1897	?		Joseph Qualtrough (elected)
1903	General Election		Edward Brian Gawne, 633 votes, elected; William Quine, 598 votes, elected; Joseph Qualtrough, 578 votes, elected; John Donald Clucas, 561 votes
1908	General Election		Ambrose Qualtrough, 575 votes, elected; Joseph Qualtrough, 534 votes, elected; John Donald Clucas, 775 votes, elected
1913	General Election		Ambrose Qualtrough, elected; Joseph Qualtrough, elected; ?
1919	General Election		James Robinson Corrin, elected; Joseph Qualtrough, elected; Ambrose Qualtrough, elected; ?
1919	By-Election		William Moore, elected; ?
Called following the election of Joseph Qualtrough to the LegCo
1924	General Election		James Robinson Corrin, elected; William Moore, elected; Ambrose Qualtrough, elected
1928	By-Election		Richard Kneen; William Arthur Kelly, elected; ?
1929	General Election		Ambrose Qualtrough, elected (?); William Arthur Kelly, elected (?); Richard Kneen, elected (?)
1931	By-Election		William Arthur Kelly, elected; ?
1934	General Election		William Arthur Kelly, elected; Richard Kneen, elected
1936	By-Election		John Joseph McArd, elected; ?
1962	General Election		Cyril Harcourt Matthews (elected)
1975	By-Election		Edmund Lowey, elected
1976	By-Election		Noel Cringle, elected
1976	General Election		Noel Cringle, elected; Edmund Lowey, elected; Sir Miles Walker, elected
1981	General Election		Noel Cringle, elected; Edmund Lowey, elected; Sir Miles Walker, elected
1982	By-Election		Charles Faragher, elected
Called following the election to the LegCo of Edmund Lowey.
1986	General Election	72.7%	Sir Miles Walker (1089 votes), elected; John Orme (701 votes), elected; John Corrin (485 votes), elected; C Price (436 votes); Noel Cringle (398 votes); RC Corrin (290 votes); JN Hall (179 votes); R StC Skinner (173 votes); AJ Gunn (141 votes); JP Gill (63 votes); PHJ Ray (54 votes)
1991	General Election	72.3%	Sir Miles Walker (1488 votes), elected; John Corrin (993 votes), elected; Noel Cringle (520 votes), elected; John Orme (478 votes); C Price (322 votes); Illiam Costain (251 votes); John Rimmington (133 votes); PHJ Ray (96 votes)
1996	General Election	65.4%	Sir Miles Walker (2499 votes), elected; Noel Cringle (1903 votes), elected; Pamela Crowe (1609 votes), elected; Illiam Costain (1568 votes); John Rimmington (1342 votes); David Bennett (774 votes); Terence Jackson (444 votes)
1997	By-Election		Pamela Crowe, elected
2000	By-Election		John Rimmington, elected
Called following the election of Noel Cringle as President of Tynwald and his elevation to the LegCo.
2001	General Election		John Rimmington, 1919 votes, elected; Quintin Gill, 1856 votes, elected; Pamela Crowe, 1644 votes, elected; Andrew Roy, 1633 votes; Philip Crellin, 1564 votes; John Gill, 826 votes
2003	By-Election		Phil Gawne, 1177 votes, elected; Philip Crellin, 1060 votes; Shirley Skeans, 505 votes; Brian Goldie, 261 votes
Called following the elevation to the LegCo of Pamela Crowe.
2006	General Election	64.73%	Phil Crellin, 1432 votes; Phil Gawne, 1794 votes, elected; Quintin Gill, 1689 votes, elected; John Rimmington, 1048 votes; Adrian Tinkler, 934 votes; Juan Watterson, 2430 votes, elected; Tony Wright, 1000 votes
Challenger Juan Watterson topped the poll, unseating John Rimmington and becoming the Island's youngest MHK.
2011	General Election		Juan Watterson, 3080 votes, elected; Laurence Skelly, 2021 votes, elected; Phil Gawne, 1942 votes, elected; Quintin Gill, 1722 votes; John Orme, 1195 votes; David Jones (Lib Van), 457 votes
Major constituency boundary change

== Election results since 2016 ==
In 2014, Tynwald approved recommendations from the Boundary Review Commission which saw the reform of the Island's electoral boundaries.

General election 2021: Rushen
Party	Candidate	Votes	%
Independent	Juan Paul Watterson	2,384	39.5
Independent	Michelle Haywood	1,386	22.9
Independent	Mark Ian Kemp	1,163	19.2
Green	Andrew Thomas Langan-Newton	1,109	18.4
Total votes		6,042	
Total ballots		3,429	
Rejected ballots		8	
Turnout		3,437	58.4
Registered electors		5,884	

General election 2016: Rushen
Party	Candidate	Votes	%
Independent	Juan Paul Watterson	2,087	36.2
Independent	Laurence David Skelly	1,212	21.0
Independent	Mark Ian Kemp	1,104	19.1
Independent	James William Hampton	1,033	17.9
Independent	Leo Simon Cussons	331	5.7
Total votes		5,767	
Total ballots		3,160	
Rejected ballots		13	
Turnout		3,173	58.3
Registered electors		5,446	
