= Arbory =

Parish on the Isle of Man

Coordinates: 54.108°N 4.694°W

Arbory: Manx: Cairbre
- Parish of Arbory, Isle of Man
- Population: 1,899
- OS grid reference: SC2390471387
- Sheading: Rushen
- Crown dependency: Isle of Man
- Post town: ISLE OF MAN
- Postcode district: IM9
- House of Keys: Arbory, Castletown & Malew

Arbory (Manx: Cairbre) is one of the seventeen historic parishes of the Isle of Man. It is located on the south of the island in the sheading of Rushen. Settlements in the parish include Ballabeg, Colby and Ronague. As of the 2021census, its population stood at 1,899 individuals. The parish features a mix of coastal plains, and highlands, with an economy based on agriculture, and tourism.

== Geography ==
Arbory is situated along the southern coast of the Isle of Man in the sheading of Rushen. It stretches from Pooil Vash to Strandhall, straddling the Colby river to Cronk Fedjag, and across the mountain to the western boundary of Malew. The parish consists of low plains in the south with highlands in the north. It has short coastline which is rocky and exposed.

== Administration ==
Since 1 May 2020, local governance has been shared with nearby Rushen under the Arbory & Rushen Parish Commissioners, offering combined services with distinct ward structures and forms part of the parish district of Arbory and Malew. The parish is headed by a captain, and forms part of the Arbory, Castletown & Malew constituency, which elects two Members to the House of Keys. The title of a captain is a ceremonial title dating to Viking era, reflecting centuries-old tradition.

== Demographics ==
According to the 2021 census, Arbory's population was recorded 1,899. The Isle of Man census of 2016 returned a parish population of 1,847, an increase of 5.4% from the figure of 1,747 in 2011. The population consisted of 928 males and 971 females, with 254 aged under 14.

Arbory (census)
Year	1996	2001	2006	2011	2016	2021
Pop.	1,622	1,714	1,723	1,747	1,847	1,899
±%	—	+5.7%	+0.5%	+1.4%	+5.7%	+2.8%

== Culture and economy ==
Local economy is dominated by agriculture including livestock and farms with a number of residents commuting to Douglas and other urban centers for employment. The parish includes small businesses such as a school, churches, local shops, and community halls that support events and local activities. The Laa Columb Killey festival, held annually in Ballabeg, celebrates St Columba with a parish fair that includes games, music, and local crafts.

== Transportation ==
The A7 and A28 roads navigate the parish. Bus Vannin routes 1, 11, and 12 provide regular services through Arbory, linking it to Douglas and neighboring towns. Colby Glen station serves seasonal heritage steam railway services, attracting tourists in summer months.
