= Local government in the Isle of Man =

Isle of Man local authorities and sheadings

Local government in the Isle of Man was formerly based on six sheadings, which were divided into seventeen parishes (today referred to as "ancient parishes"). The island is today divided for local government purposes into town districts, village districts, parish districts, and "districts", as follows:

- Four town districts: Douglas (city), Castletown, Peel and Ramsey
- Two "districts": Michael, Onchan
- Two village districts: Port Erin and Port St Mary
- Thirteen parish districts: Andreas, Arbory and Rushen, Ballaugh, Braddan, Bride, Garff, German, Jurby, Lezayre, Malew, Marown, Patrick, Santon

== Sheadings ==
The Isle of Man was historically divided into six sheadings (Manx: sheadinyn): in the traditional clockwise order, they are Glenfaba, Michael, Ayre, Garff, Middle, and Rushen. The sheadings are now significant only as:

- the districts of the Coroners (although two pairs of sheadings are now combined for this purpose), and
- the basis of certain electoral constituencies (now somewhat loosely).

The Coroners are responsible for process-serving and enforcement of judgments, not for holding inquests of death; that function is carried out by the High Bailiff, who is ex officio Coroner of Inquests.

The origins of the term sheading are unclear. There are three main possibilities:

- from the Norse word skeid – meaning ship-assembly, with each sheading providing men for a warship.
- from Middle Irish seissed meaning "sixth part" – with the sheadings having been a 14th-century Scottish introduction.
- from the Middle English word for an administrative division, scheding – with the sheadings having been introduced following English rule in the late 14th century.

== Parishes ==
The parishes have ecclesiastical roots and are thought to have been introduced to the island in the 11th century from Scotland, the bishopric having been established in the 10th century. Civil parishes also existed from at least the late 15th century, their boundaries diverging significantly in some cases, where one or more Treens might pay their ecclesiastical tithes to one parish, but their Lord's Rent to another. Parish boundaries broadly followed physical features such as rivers and watersheds, but there were many detailed divergences. For example, a mill and its croft, located on the west bank of a river, could be included in the adjoining parish east of the river by a loop in the boundary.

The parishes within each sheading of the Isle of Man are currently:

- Ayre – Andreas, Bride, Lezayre
- Garff – Lonan, Maughold
- Glenfaba – German, Patrick
- Michael – Ballaugh (Balley ny Loughey), Jurby (Jourbee), Michael (Maayl)
- Middle – Braddan, Marown, Onchan (Kione Droghad), Santon
- Rushen – Arbory, Malew, Rushen (Rosien)

The above are historic parishes; the ecclesiastical parishes of the Anglican church have been altered considerably to reflect the geographical distribution of the island's population.

== Reforms in the 18th to 21st centuries ==
=== Town districts ===
An Act of Tynwald of 1777 provided for the appointment of a High Bailiff for each of the four towns, Castletown, Douglas, "Peeltown" (Peel) and Ramsey, with various judicial and administrative responsibilities.

The Towns Act 1852 provided for the first elected local authorities in the Island, enabling a board of Town Commissioners to be elected for each of the four towns, with responsibility for street cleaning, lighting and sewerage. However, the Act was not adopted by any of the towns, and special Acts were passed establishing Commissioners for each town: Douglas 1860, Ramsey 1865, Castletown 1883 and Peel 1884. The boundaries of the town districts have been extended over time to incorporate new developments.

In 1896, Douglas was incorporated as a municipal borough by the Douglas Municipal Corporation Act 1895, which replaced the Town Commissioners with a municipal corporation entitled "The Mayor, Aldermen and Burgesses of the Borough of Douglas", acting through a borough council, consisting of a mayor, aldermen and councillors. In 1989 the office of alderman was abolished, leaving the council composed of the mayor and councillors. The 18 councillors are elected from 6 wards, each for a four-year term expiring on 1 May 2012, 2016, and so on. The mayor is elected annually by the councillors, usually (but not necessarily) from their own number. Although there are no longer any aldermen, the corporation's legal title is unchanged. As its name implies, it is a body corporate, but the borough council is not.

=== Village districts ===
The Public Health Act 1884 permitted the creation of elected sanitary authorities for sanitary districts. Port Erin was the only sanitary district so defined.

The Local Government Act 1886 provided for elected boards of Village Commissioners and the creation, by resolution of Tynwald, of new village districts. The existing sanitary authority of Port Erin became a board of Commissioners. Port St Mary was created a village district in 1890, Laxey and Onchan in 1895, and Michael in 1905.

In 1986 the existing village district and parish district of Onchan were merged to form a "local government district of Onchan" under a single body of Commissioners (but with a separate consultative "rural committee" representing the former parish district). In 1989 the village district and parish district of Michael were similarly merged (but without a rural committee). In both cases the current districts are described simply as "districts" and are neither parish districts nor village districts.

=== Parish districts ===
The Local Government Amendment Act 1894 created boards of Parish Commissioners for 17 parish districts, each of which comprised so much of the corresponding ancient parish as was not comprised in a town or village district. As noted above, Onchan and Michael parish districts have since been amalgamated with the corresponding village districts.

The powers of Parish Commissioners are somewhat less than those of Village Commissioners.

=== Joint boards ===
In 1938 the Local Government Board was empowered to create a board (commonly referred to as a "combination authority") consisting of members of two or more local authorities to exercise specified functions of those authorities. Such an authority, now called a "joint board", is a body corporate, and its members are appointed from the members of the constituent local authorities (and in some cases representatives of the Department of Local Government and the Environment). Joint boards are created for a specified purpose, and existing boards deal with refuse collection, sheltered accommodation, civic amenity sites, and swimming pools. Local authorities also have power to set up "joint committees", which are similar to joint boards but are not bodies corporate.

=== Central supervision of local authorities ===
A Local Government Board was established in 1894 with responsibility for supervising the new local authorities. It was reconstituted in 1922, 1946 (when it was renamed "Isle of Man Local Government Board"), 1952 and 1957.

In 1987 the board was dissolved and its functions transferred to a new Department of Local Government and the Environment, headed by a Minister for Local Government and the Environment. The functions of that department relating to local government were in turn transferred to a new Department of Infrastructure in 2010.

== Local government reorganisation ==
The structure of local government in the Isle of Man has been recognised as unsatisfactory since before the Second World War, but no consensus on how it should be reformed has been achieved. Proposals for reform were made by the Local Government Board and various committees in 1934, 1949, 1963 and 1967.

A Select Committee of Tynwald in 1985 recommended a thorough review, and an interim report of a further Select Committee in 1986 led to a consultation document Time for Change containing proposals by the Department of Local Government and the Environment, issued in December 1991. Two interim reports were followed in 1994 by a final report by the Department making recommendations for reorganisation, itself incorporated in a report by the Council of Ministers, which however failed to endorse those recommendations.

In 1999, as no progress had been made, the Council of Ministers admitted that it had been unable to agree on proposals, and Tynwald set up a further Select Committee which reported in 2001 with a scheme to reduce the number of local authorities to four. However, it merely "received" the report, declining to approve its recommendations.

The next set of proposals, also for four local authorities, were made by the Department of Local Government and the Environment in 2004, but were shelved because of opposition from the existing authorities. An alternative plan, which would have preserved the existing authorities but transferred their waste collection and housing functions to joint boards, was produced shortly afterwards but also abandoned. The Department revived its previous proposals in 2005, but shelved them again due to lack of support.

After 30 years, the only step taken towards any reorganisation of local government, apart from the mergers in Onchan and Michael (above), has been to confer on the Department power by order to merge two or more local authorities with their consent. This power has not been exercised.

However, in 2016 the village district of Laxey and the parish districts of Lonan and Maughold were merged to form the new parish district of Garff.

In 2020 the parish district of Arbory and that of Rushen were similarly merged to form the new parish district of Arbory and Rushen, with separate electoral wards for each of the two former districts.

== Local government today ==
(The sheadings are not local government units today.)

Local Authority	Type	Sheading	Keys Constituency
Andreas	parish	Ayre	Ayre & Michael
Arbory and Rushen	parish	Rushen	Arbory, Castletown & Malew; Rushen
Ballaugh	parish	Michael	Ayre & Michael
Braddan	parish	Middle	Middle
Bride	parish	Ayre	Ayre & Michael
Castletown	town	Rushen	Arbory, Castletown & Malew
Douglas	town	Middle	Douglas East; Douglas West; Douglas North; Douglas South
Garff	parish	Garff	Garff
German	parish	Glenfaba	Glenfaba & Peel
Jurby	parish	Michael	Ayre & Michael
Lezayre	parish	Ayre	Ayre & Michael
Malew	parish	Rushen	Arbory, Castletown & Malew
Marown	parish	Middle	Middle
Michael	district	Michael	Ayre & Michael
Onchan	district	Middle	Onchan
Patrick	parish	Glenfaba	Glenfaba & Peel
Peel	town	Glenfaba	Glenfaba & Peel
Port Erin	village	Rushen	Rushen
Port St Mary	village	Rushen	Rushen
Ramsey	town	Garff	Ramsey
Santon	parish	Middle	Middle
