= Captain of the Parish =

Office in Isle of Man

The Captain of the Parish is an official in each parish in the Isle of Man—formerly the title was Captain of the Parish Militia, but it is now only a titular honour. Historically the Captain of the Parish was authorised to raise his own militia in his parish and had the duty to light beacons informing the parish of an invasion.

A Captain of the Parish is referred to by the prenominal title Captain. A person may hold the Captaincy of more than one parish at any one time. The title is held until death, unless it is removed for bad conduct, which has not occurred for many centuries.

One remaining function of the Captain of the Parish is in connection with requisition meetings during Keys elections. A requisition meeting can be held following the close of nominations, provided a formal request is made in writing by registered electors to the Captain of the Parish or the local authority, who will then invite all candidates to address the voters at a requisition meeting and answer their questions. This is now somewhat more complicated as a number of the new Keys constituency boundaries do not coincide with the boundaries of the traditional parishes, and there was some debate, during the oral evidence to the Select Committee of Tynwald on the Organisation and Operation of the General Election 2016, about the role of the Captains of Parishes in connection with calling these meetings.

Parish	Captain
Andreas Parish	David Martin
Arbory Parish	Claire Whiteway
Ballaugh Parish	Edgar Cowin
Braddan Parish	Philip Caley
Bride Parish	John James Teare
German Parish	Allen Corlett
Jurby Parish	John Quayle
Lezayre Parish	Dennis Duggan
Lonan Parish	Stephen Carter
Malew Parish	Peter Quayle
Marown Parish	Charles Fargher MBE JP
Maughold Parish	Clare Christian
Michael District	John Cannell
Onchan District	Peter Kelly MBE
Patrick Parish	Patricia Costain JP
Rushen Parish	Paul Costain
Santon Parish	Donald Gelling CBE

Although Onchan and Michael are now Districts for local authority purposes, the districts are also ancient parishes and so they still have Captains of the Parish.

The equivalent title for towns is Captain of the Town; however this title is no longer used. The town areas of the Isle of Man are:

- Ramsey
- Douglas
- Castletown
- Peel

== See also ==
- State Officials of the Isle of Man
