= IM postcode area =

Postcode area for the Isle of Man

Isle of Man
- Postcode area
- Location within the British Islands
- Coordinates: 54.152°N 4.529°W
- Sovereign state responsible: United Kingdom
- Crown Dependency: Isle of Man
- Postcode area: IM
- Postcode area name: Isle of Man
- Post towns: 1
- Postcode districts: 11
- Postcode sectors: 53
- Postcodes (live): 4,650
- Postcodes (total): 6,042
- Statistics as at May 2020

Postcodes were introduced in the Isle of Man in 1993, with the island becoming the IM postcode area. Each town or area is associated with one or more postcode districts, assigned by Isle of Man Post Office. Outside the larger towns, the postcode districts are further broken down and each postal sector is assigned to a number of villages and settlements.

Mail for the IM postcode area is processed by the Isle of Man Post Office at their headquarters in Douglas.

== Coverage ==
The approximate coverage of the postcode districts (and sectors, where relevant) is as follows. In each case the post town is "ISLE OF MAN". The "coverage" column includes the next digit of the post code (the sector).

Postcode district	Coverage
IM1	Douglas
IM2	Douglas
IM3	Onchan
IM4	Middle region: 1 Port Soderick and Santon; 2 Greeba and Braddan; 3 St John's and Foxdale; 4 Braddan; 5 Onchan; 6 Baldrine; 7 Laxey and Lonan
IM5	1 Peel; 2 German; 3 Patrick
IM6	Kirk Michael
IM7	North region: 1 Maughold; 2 Sulby and Lezayre; 3 Jurby; 4 Andreas and Bride; 5 Ballaugh
IM8	Ramsey
IM9	South region: 1 Castletown; 2 Ballasalla; 3 Malew; 4 Arbory; 5 Port St Mary; 6 Port Erin
IM86	PO boxes and large users
IM87	PO boxes and large users
IM99	PO boxes and large users

== See also ==
- Postcode Address File
- List of postcode areas in the United Kingdom
