= List of rivers of the Isle of Man =

This is a list of rivers of the Isle of Man. It is organised geographically, taken anti-clockwise, from Douglas. Tributaries are listed down the page in an upstream direction.

== Rivers ==
- River Glass
  - River Dhoo
    - Greeba River
  - Sulby River
  - Baldwin River
- Groudle River
- Ballacottier River
- Laxey River
  - Glen Roy
- Cornaa River
- Sulby River
  - Glen Auldyn River
- The Lhen Trench
- Killane River
- River Neb
  - Foxdale River
  - Blaber River
- Glenmaye River
- Colby River
- Silver Burn
- Santon Burn
- Crogga River

== See also ==
- Geography of the Isle of Man
