= List of places in the Isle of Man =

In addition to the Isle of Man itself, the Isle of Man Government administers three small neighbouring islands: the Calf of Man, St Patrick's Isle and St Michael's Isle. There is one place with official status as a city, three places with official status as towns, four villages, and many other smaller settlements. Traditionally the Island is divided into six sheadings, then further into seventeen parishes.

Manx language names are given in italics.

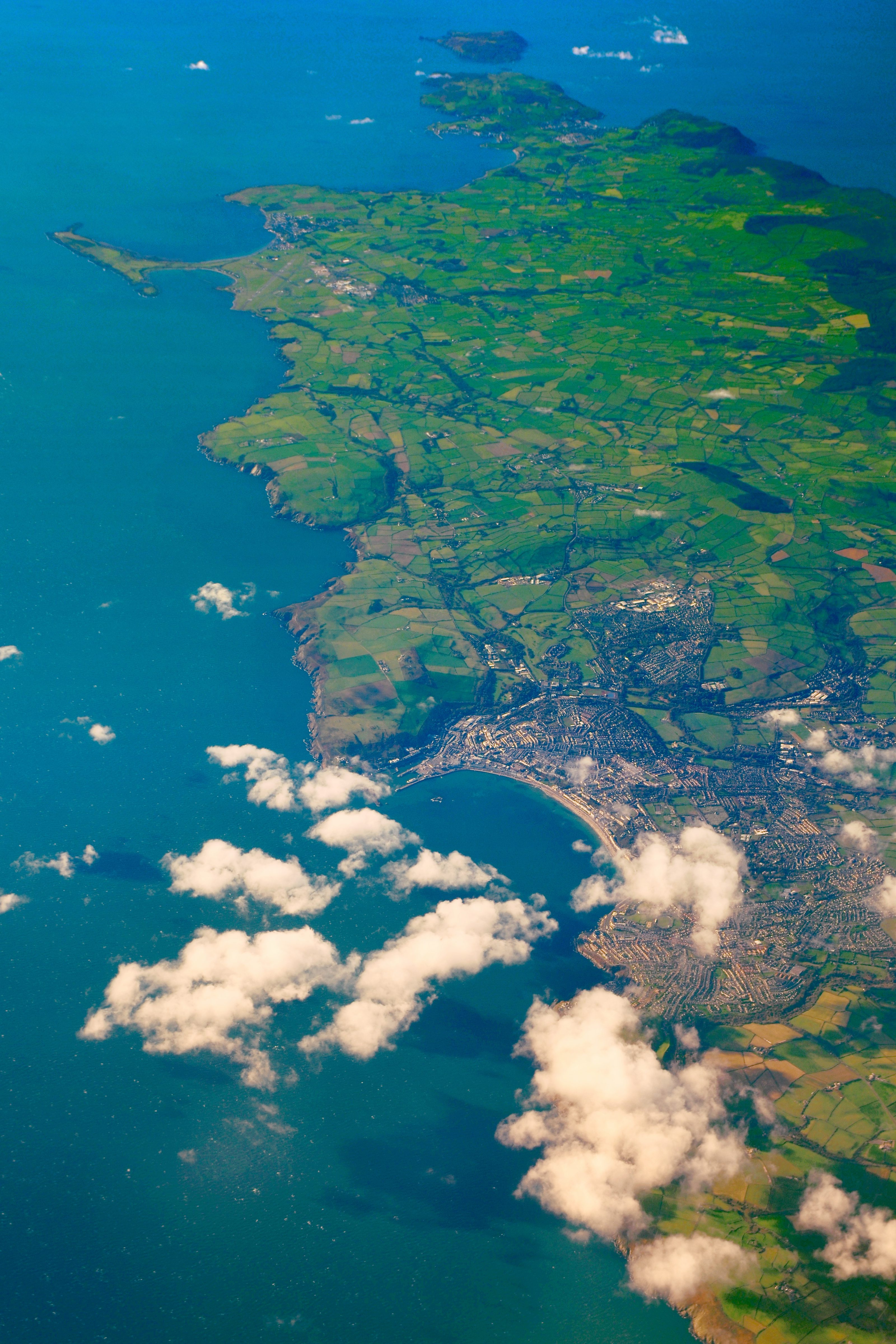
Aerial view of Douglas and the southern half of the Isle of Man

== Cities ==
There is only one city on the island, a status which was awarded in 2022 and came into effect in 2024:

- Douglas – capital and largest settlement (Doolish)

== Towns ==
The official towns of the Isle of Man are:

- Castletown (Balley Chashtal)
- Peel (Purt ny h-Inshey)
- Ramsey (Rhumsaa)

== Villages ==
The official villages of the Isle of Man, with village commissioners, are:

- Laxey (Laksaa) – no longer has village commissioners; is now merely an electoral ward of the parish district of Garff
- Onchan – second largest settlement (Kione Droghad)
- Port St Mary (Purt le Moirrey)
- Port Erin (Purt Çhiarn)

== Other settlements ==
Other notable settlements, with no official status, are:

- Andreas (Andreas)
- Baldrine (Balley Drine)
- Ballabeg (Rushen) (Balley Beg)
- Ballabeg (Lonan) (Balley Beg)‡
- Ballasalla (Balley Sallagh)
- Ballaugh (Balley ny Loughey)
- Barregarrow (Bayr Garroo)‡
- Braaid (Yn Braaid)‡
- Bradda
- Bride (Bride)
- Colby (Colby)
- Cregneash (Creneash)‡
- Crosby (Balley ny Croshey)
- Dalby (Delbee)
- Derbyhaven (Camys y Ree)‡
- Foxdale (Forsdal)
- Glen Auldyn
- Glen Maye (Glion Muigh)
- Glen Mona (Glion Shuin)
- Glen Vine (Glion Vian)
- Injebreck‡
- Jurby (Jurby)
- Maughold (Maghal)‡
- Kirk Michael (Skylley Maayl)
- Newtown (Balley Noa)
- Niarbyl (Yn Arbyl)‡
- Port e Vullen‡
- Port Lewaigue‡
- Port Soderick (Purt Soderick)‡
- Ronague (Eairy Shynnagh)‡
- Ronaldsway (Roonysvaie)‡
- St Judes (Balley Keeill Yude)
- St John's (Balley Keeill Eoin)
- St Mark's (Balley Keeill Varkysh)
- Strang (Strang)
- Sulby (Sulby)
- Union Mills (Myllin Doo Aah)

Those marked ‡ (at least) are mostly not large enough to be notable as settlements, but some may be notable as tourist destinations.

== Settlements by population ==
The following list ranks the populations of eight main settlements on the Isle of Man which populations were reported in the 2021 Isle of Man Census.

Rank	Settlement	Status	Population	Notes
1.	Douglas	City	26,677	Capital and only city
2.	Onchan	Village	9,039	Most populated village, adjacent to Douglas
3.	Ramsey	Town	8,288	Became the most populated town after Douglas achieved city status in 2022
4.	Peel	Town	5,710	
5.	Port Erin	Village	3,730	Adjacent to Port St. Mary
6.	Castletown	Town	3,206	Least populous town on the Island
7.	Port St. Mary	Village	1,989	Adjacent to Port Erin
8.	Laxey	Village	1,656	Least populous village and least populous settlement with an official status

== Sheadings ==
The sheadings (Manx: sheadin (singular), sheadinyn (plural)) of the Isle of Man are:

- Ayre (Inver Ayre)
- Garff (Garff)
- Glenfaba (Glion Faba)
- Michael (Maayl)
- Middle (Medall)
- Rushen (Rosien)

== Historic parishes ==
The historic parishes (Manx: skeerey (singular), skeeraghyn (plural)) currently included in each sheading of the Isle of Man are:

- Ayre
  - Andreas (Andreas / Skeerey Andreas)
  - Bride (Breeshey / Skeerey Vreeshey)
  - Lezayre (Creest ny h-Ayrey / Skeerey Chreest ny h-Ayrey)
- Garff
  - Lonan (Lonan / Skeerey Lonan): historical parish, now merged into the parish district of Garff
  - Maughold (Maghal / Skeerey Maghal): historical parish, now merged into the parish district of Garff
  - Onchan (Connaghyn / Skeerey Chonnaghyn)
- Glenfaba
  - German (Carmane / Skeerey Charmane)
  - Patrick (Perick / Skeerey Pherick)
- Michael
  - Ballaugh (Balley ny Loghy / Skeerey Valley ny Loghey)
  - Jurby (Jorby / Skeerey Jorby)
  - Michael (Maayl / Skeerey Maayl)
- Middle
  - Braddan (Braddan / Skeerey Braddan)
  - Marown (Marooney / Skeerey Marooney)
  - Santon (Stondane / Skeerey Stondane)
- Rushen
  - Arbory (Cairbre / Skeerey Chairbre): now merged into the parish district of Arbory and Rushen
  - Rushen (historically "Kirk Christ Rushen") (Rosien / Skeerey Rosien): now merged into the parish district of Arbory and Rushen
  - Malew (Malew / Skeerey Malew)

Historically, each parish was divided into between 5 and 16 treens, each consisting of four quarterlands.

== Coastal features ==
- Laxey Bay
- Ramsey Bay
- Douglas Bay

== Other geographical features ==
- Port-Ny-Ding, a small bay immediately north-west of Bradda West
- Snaefell (Sniaul), the only mountain of the Isle of Man

== See also ==
- Registered Buildings of the Isle of Man
- Local government in the Isle of Man
- Ballajura, Western Australia, a suburb in Australia named after but mis-transcribed from Ballajora, a farm at Maughold, Isle of Man.
