= Blaber =

Blaber or bláber may refer to:

- Archibald Blaber (1867–1905), an English cricketer who played for Sussex
- Blaber River, a minor river on the Isle of Man
- Blaber (gamer), a professional League of Legends player

== See also ==
- Blab
- Blueberry
