= St Trinian's Church =

Church in Marown, Isle of Man

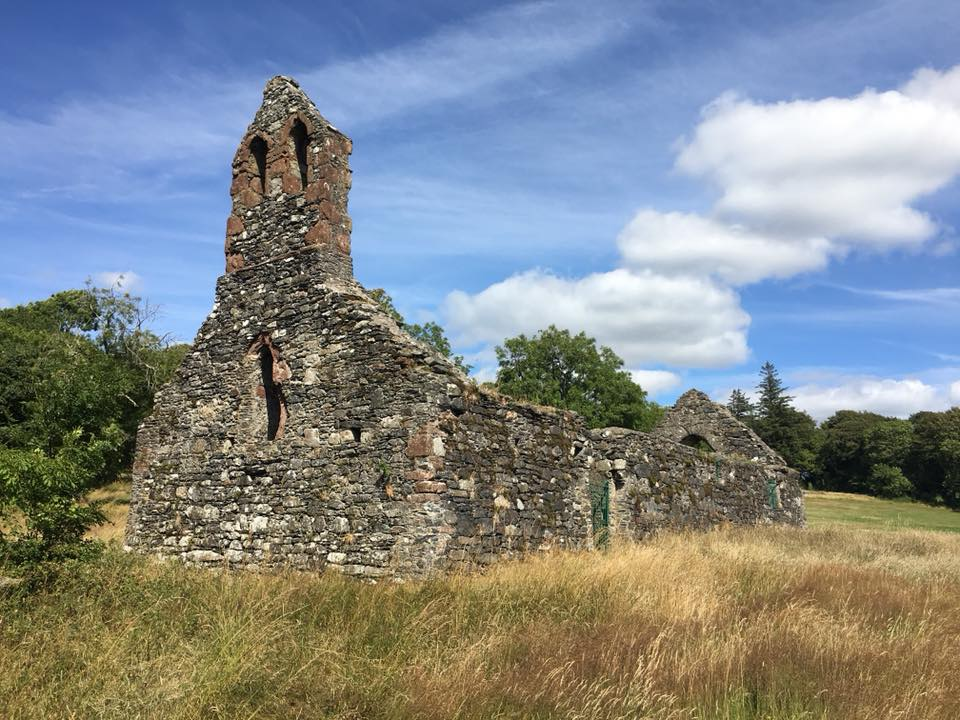
- St Trinian's Church, Crosby, Isle of Man

- 54.1902°N 4.5799°W
- Location: Crosby, Isle of Man
- Country: Isle of Man
- Denomination: Interdenominational
- Tradition: Interdenominational
- Website: www.visitisleofman.com/things-to-do/st-trinians-church-p1309191

History
- Status: Ruin
- Founded: 14th Century
- Dedication: Saint Ninian
- Consecrated: 14th Century

Architecture
- Functional status: Inactive
- Style: Manx Chapel
- Groundbreaking: 4th Century (original Keeil)

Administration
- Diocese: Diocese of Sodor and Man
- Parish: Marown

St Trinian's Church is the roofless ruin of a small chapel at the foot of Greeba Mountain, adjacent to the main A1 Douglas - Peel Road in the parish of Marown, Isle of Man. Referred to in the Manx language as a "Keeil Brisht" (broken church), the church is the source of an ancient Manx folk tale concerning the Buggane, a huge mythical ogre who lived on Greeba Mountain and who vowed that the church should never be completed.

== History ==
Tradition says that the church was erected in fulfilment of a vow made by a shipwrecked person. It was dedicated to the 4th century Scottish Pictish saint, Ninian, but later the name changed to Trinian.

St Trinian's is recorded as a ruin of a 14th century church on an ancient site, as proved by the 7th century cross on the grave which can be seen at the front of the remains of the altar. The cross possibly marks the site of the founder's shrine in what would have been an original Manx Keeil.

In connection with St Trinian's Church there was an independent barony, whose tenants owed no immediate fealty to the King of Mann, though the Baron was the King's vassal. The barony lands were given by King Olaf II of Man in or about the year 1230, and successive charters or confirmations refer to the church of St Ninian and the hospitals at Ballacgniba and Balhamer.

The Barony of St Trinian's therefore consisted of a religious house, the hospitals (or guest houses) and the church. All the time the monks were at St Trinian's it may be assumed that the church was to all intents and purposes the parish church.

The church belonged to the Priory of Whithorn, in modern Dumfries and Galloway.

Traditionally the plan of the old Manx churches is in proportion to that of St Trinian's: the length is about three times the breadth.

After the collapse of the religious house the church was moved to a site on the hill beside the Rocky Lane above Ellerslie Farm, which was established as Old St Runius. There was certainly an earlier church on this site, but the structure which stands there today undoubtedly contains a great deal of material removed from St Trinian's.

By the late 19th century and into the early 20th century, St Trinian's Church had become a popular venue for Sunday School picnics.

For the first time in many hundreds of years divine service was conducted at St Trinian's on 4 September 1911. Contemporary reports state that a large number of people attended: far too many to be accommodated inside the chapel. The Bishop of Sodor and Man officiated, accompanied by the Lieutenant Governor of the Isle of Man, Lord Raglan, who read the lesson, and the Reverend Clarke who read the prayers. Lady Raglan also attended; the Crosby Brass Band accompanied the singing. This led to other occasions when the church was used for worship.

In September 1916 St Trinian's was used as one of the locations for the filming of The Manxman, a film based on the novel by Hall Caine. Caine lived in Greeba Castle, adjacent to St Trinian's.

Despite more fanciful folk tales to the contrary, the most probable reason why the church remained unfinished is that it was being built some time in the early 14th century, while the island was under the rule of the Scots. Construction may well have halted in 1343, when William Montagu, 1st Earl of Salisbury, conquered the island and expelled its Scottish owners, who would have included the monks of Whithorn Priory.

== The Buggane of St Trinian's ==
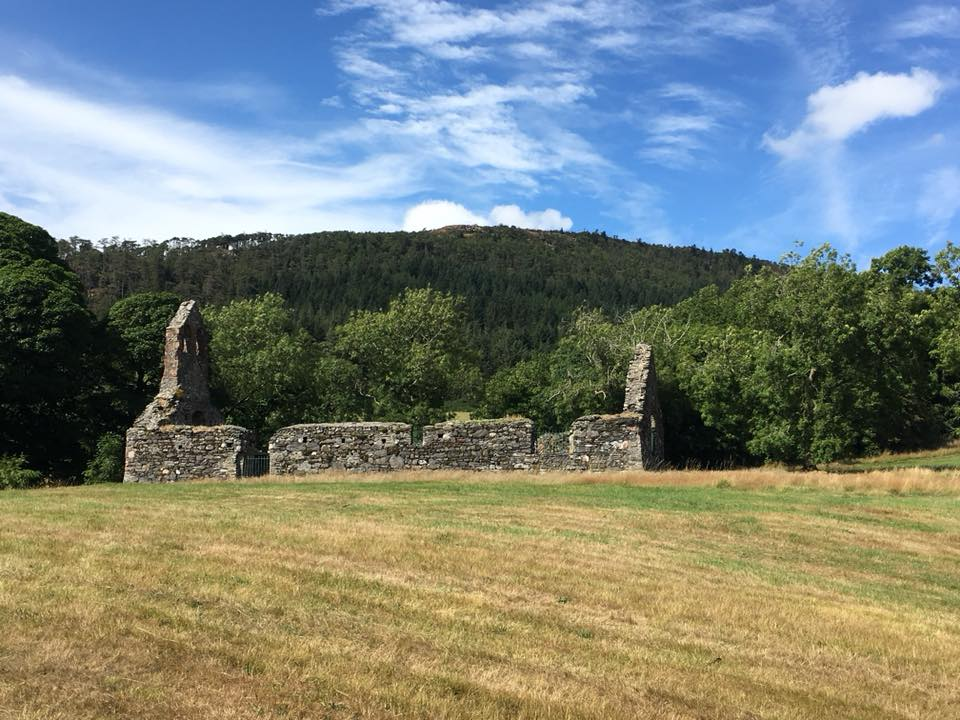
St Trinian's Church with Greeba Mountain in the background

A renowned Manx folk tale tells of the big Buggane, a supernatural being which lived on Greeba Mountain, and strongly objected to the church roof being completed. Every time a roof was put on the chapel, the Buggane would come down from the mountain and throw it off.

On the last occasion of the roof being almost finished, legend says that a young tailor named Timothy Clucas wagered he would sit in the church all night and make a pair of breeches in order to exorcise the troublesome ogre. The Buggane rose from the ground, taunting Timothy, who did not look up but carried on stitching the breeches for all he was worth. Before the Buggane's taunts were finished, Timothy completed the breeches, and jumped out of the church just as the roof crashed in, dropping his needle and scissors as he made good his escape.

The fiendish laugh of the Buggane arose behind him as he bounded off in flight, to which terror lent its utmost speed. Looking behind him he saw the Buggane closing on him, extending its jaws as if to swallow him alive. To escape its fury Timothy leaped into consecrated ground; bugganes were unable to stand on consecrated ground. In a fit of anger the Buggane ripped off its head and threw it at Timothy, where it exploded like a bomb. Timothy was unscathed, but the church of St Trinian has remained to this day without a roof.

The Rev. Philip Moore born in 1705; he was for 46 years chaplain of Douglas; he preached at Bishop Wilson's funeral and was a curate of Marown. He got into Bishop Wilson's bad books when one night he masqueraded on the ruins of St Trinian's to scare the country people and to show them how wrong they were in believing in the mythical story of the Buggane.

== Guardianship & Access ==
On 25th May 1908 Manx National Heritage became the guardian of the Scheduled Ancient Monument, including both ruins and its former burial ground via deed Mar.1909.00108. On 17th July 1982 public access was enshrined via deed July.1982.00357 as follows, “People, but not dogs, should have unrestricted access to St. Trinians Chapel through the wicket gate.”

== Gallery ==
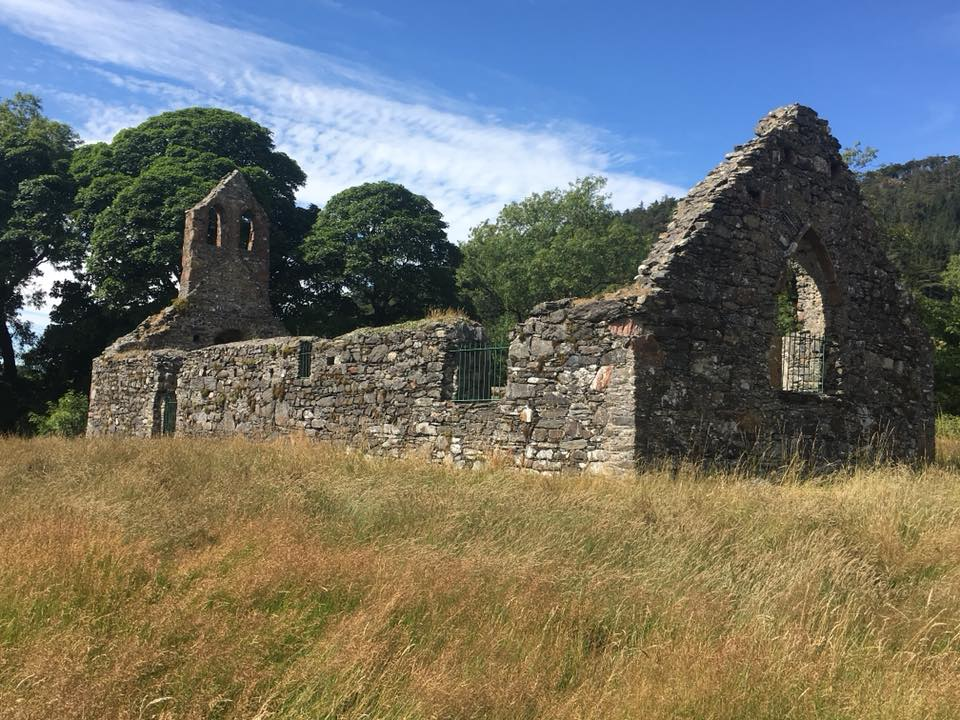

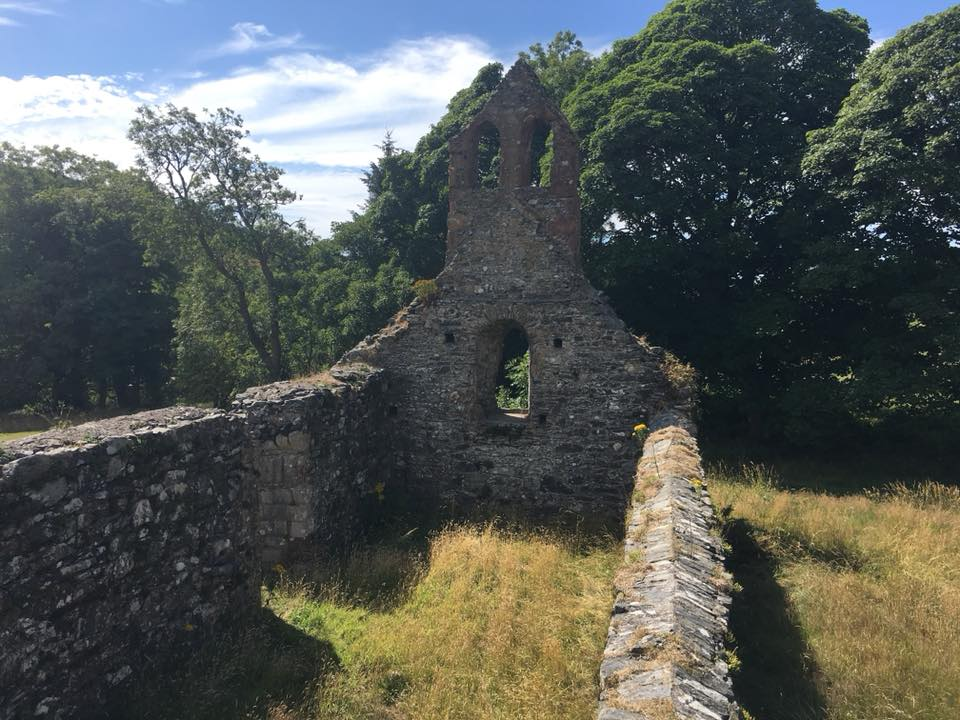

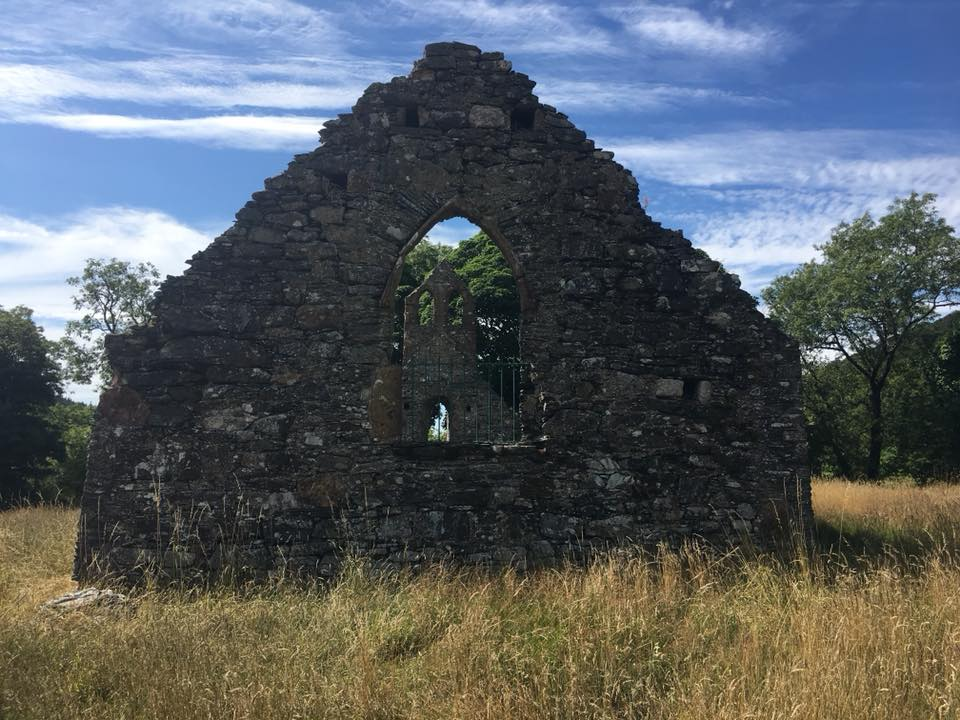

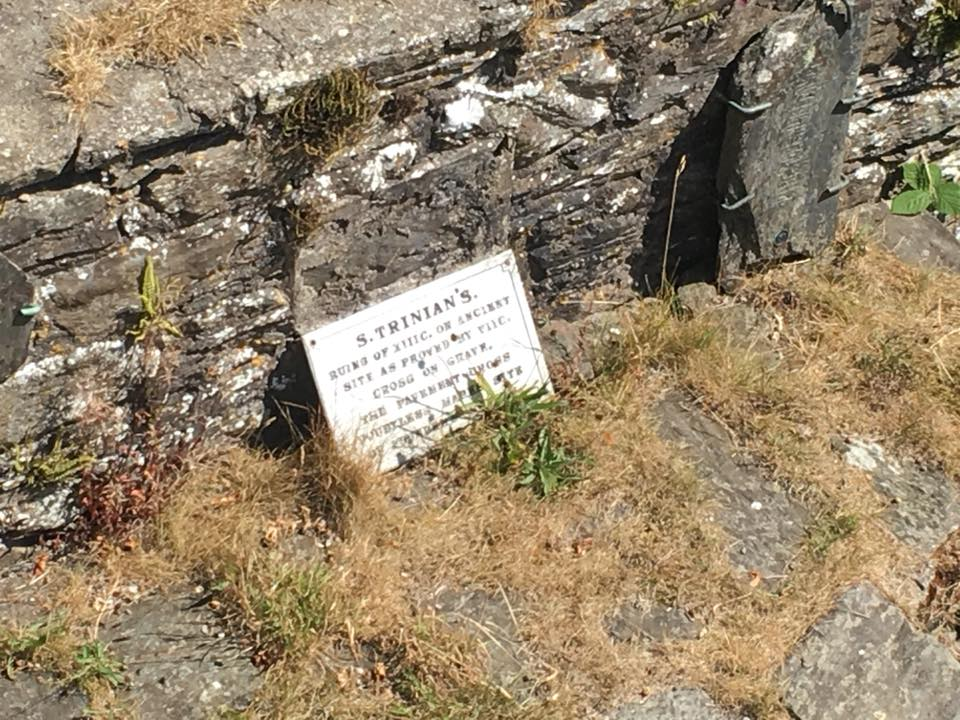

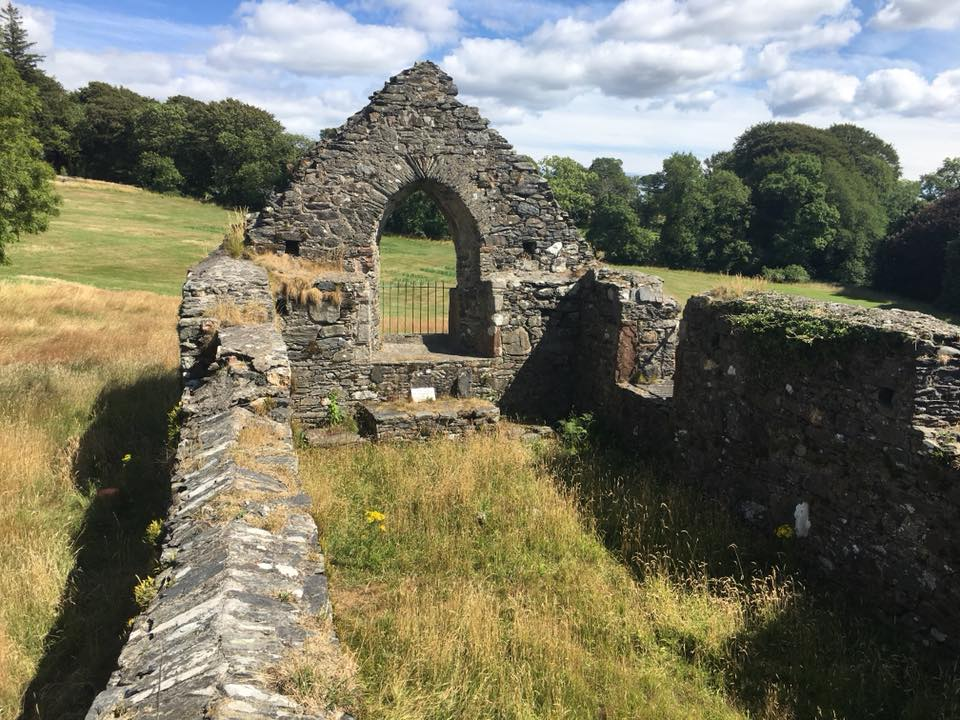

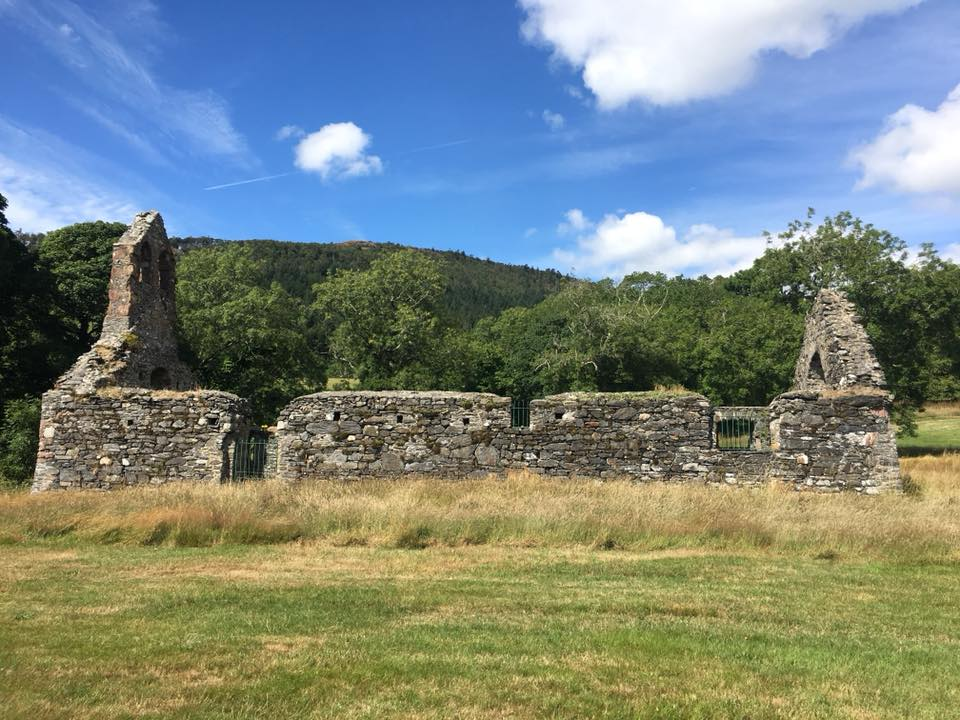

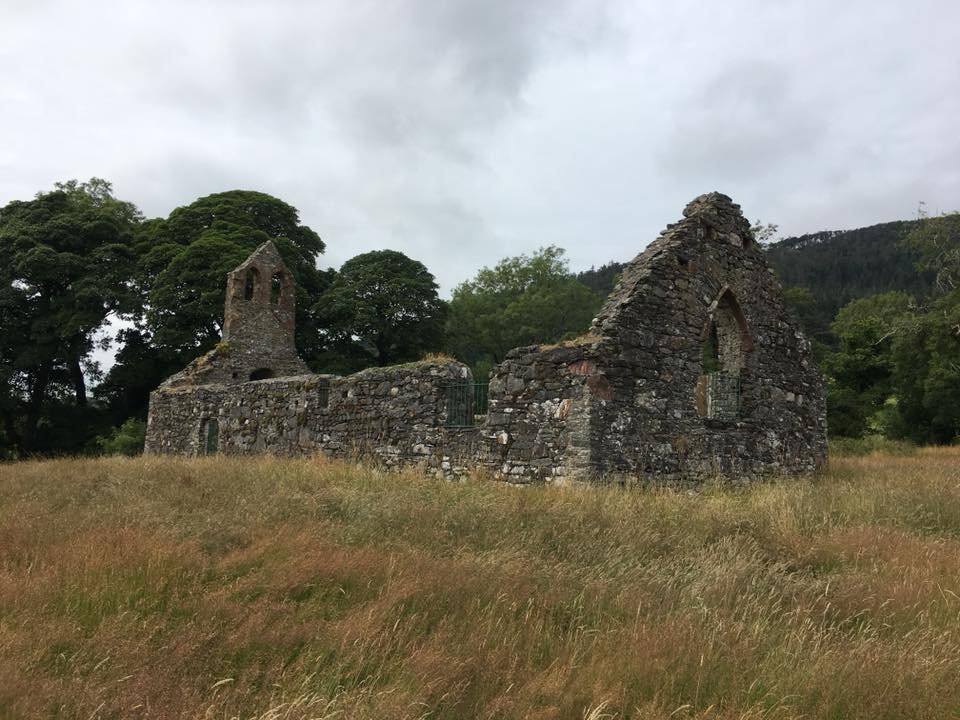

== See also ==
- Old St. Runius, Marown
