= Glen Roy (disambiguation) =

Glen Roy is a glen in the Scottish Highlands.

Glen Roy or Glenroy may also refer to:

== Australia ==
- Glenroy, New South Wales
- Glenroy, Queensland, a locality in the Rockhampton Region
- Glenroy, South Australia
- Glenroy, Victoria
  - Glenroy Football Club
  - Glenroy railway station
  - Glenroy Specialist School

== British Crown Dependency ==
- Glen Roy (Isle of Man)

== Canada ==
- Glenroy, Ontario, Canada

== New Zealand ==
- Glenroy, New Zealand

== United States ==
- Glen Roy, Ohio, United States
