= Greeba Castle =

Castle on the Isle of Man

Coordinates: 54°11′35″N 4°35′20″W

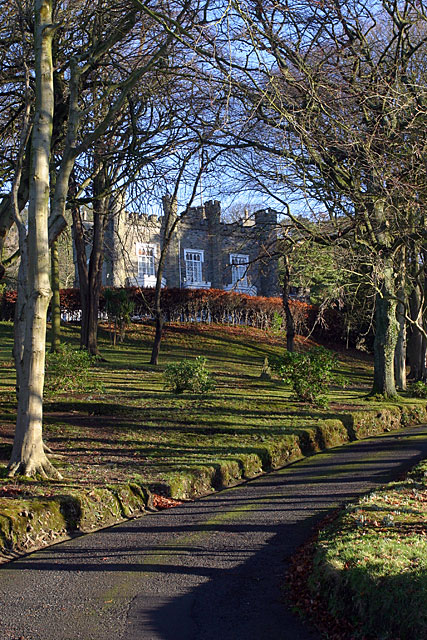
Greeba Castle, Isle of Man

Greeba Castle is a castle on the Isle of Man.

== Etymology ==
The name is derived from Scandinavian: Gnipa, a peak.

== Location ==
The castle is situated in the parish of German (but close to the boundary with Marown) on the main A1 Peel Road in the Isle of Man. It is about 1 km east of the hamlet of Greeba and 3 km east of the village of St Johns.

== Nearby features ==
The castle is situated where the main road crosses the watershed between the east and west of the island. The former Douglas to Peel railway line runs parallel to the main road. The surrounding area is mainly farmland, including the Greeba River and the former Greeba Curragh with the nearby summits of Greeba Mountain (422 m) and Slieau Ruy (479 m). Also nearby are the ruins of St Trinian's Chapel.

== History ==
At the base of Greeba Mountain and the Kings Forest, or Greeba Plantation, there are two Victorian castellated residences built in 1849 in an elevated position in the Gothic style, on the site of a property that had been known as Booilrenny (perhaps boayl rennee, "place of the fern"). These houses, Greeba Towers and Greeba Castle, were designed by John Robinson of Douglas, a self-taught architect who designed many properties in the town of Douglas including the Bank of Mona (now the Tynwald Building), the Falcon Cliff, Douglas Head Hotel and the Derby Castle, all in a castellated style with Gothic influence. The house was originally built for William Nowell, but it was later bought by Edward Windus, the son of a partner of the publisher, Chatto & Windus. The Victorian novelist Hall Caine moved to the Isle of Man in 1894 and rented Greeba Castle for a six-month period before residing briefly in Peel. Caine bought the house, in a poor state of repair, in 1896. He lived there until his death in 1931, and it was partly remodelled during that time.

According to a folk tale, the owner of Greeba Castle lost the property in a game of cards but built Greeba Towers in front of his former property to block the view of the new owner. Greeba Castle was at one time used as a school.

== Races ==
The castle is between the 5th and 6th milestone roadside markers on the Snaefell Mountain Course used for the Isle of Man TT and Manx Grand Prix races. It was part of the Four Inch Course used for the Tourist Trophy car races between 1905 and 1922, and was part of the course used for 1905 International Motor Cycle Cup races.
