= Baldwin River (Isle of Man) =

River on the Isle of Man

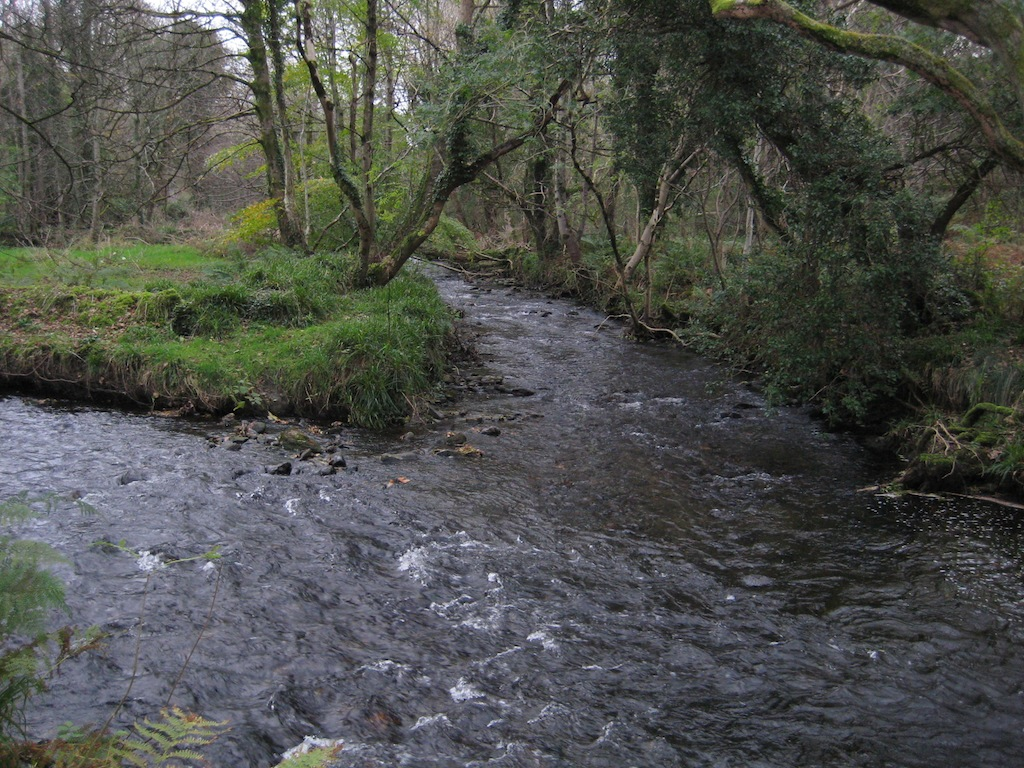

Location
- Country: Isle of Man

Physical characteristics
- Source: Beinn-y-Phott
  - coordinates: 54.237°N 4.479°W
  - elevation: 300 m (980 ft)
- Mouth: Confluence with River Glass
  - coordinates: 54.189°N 4.512°W
- Length: 6.3 km (3.9 mi)

Basin features
- Tributaries
  - left: Creg-y-Cowin River

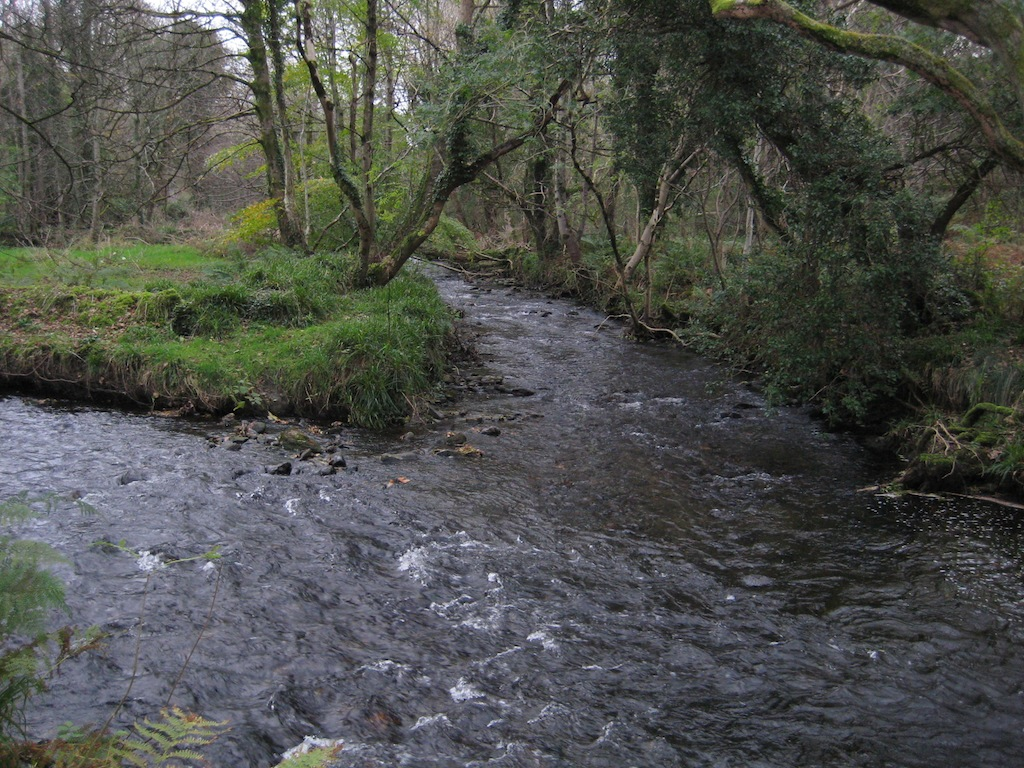
Baldwin River (middle) joining the River Glass

The Baldwin River is a left tributary of the River Glass on the Isle of Man. It is about 6 km long. It rises near Beinn-y-Phott (and near Brandywell Corner on the TT Course) and flows southwards through the East Baldwin valley to join the Glass about 4 km east of Crosby and just over a mile (or just under 2 km) north of Noble's Hospital, Douglas. For much of its course it forms the parish boundary between Braddan (to the west) and Onchan (to the east).

Its name in Manx Gaelic, from which the English version appears to be derived, is Awin Voaldyn, or Boaldyn before initial mutation, which corresponds to the festival of Beltane in May.
