= Thomas Christian =

Thomas Christian (1754–1828) was the translator of John Milton's Paradise Lost into Manx Gaelic, while leaving out passages in a way that were widely considered to have greatly improved the narrative structure of Milton's original. Rev. Christian was also an author of Manx carols and other Christian poetry important to Manx literature. He spent most of life as the Anglican vicar of Marown parish, Isle of Man.

== Life ==
Thomas Christian was the second son of John Christian (1728–1779), Vicar of Marown for 26 years, from 1753 to 1779, and his wife Elizabeth. Thomas Christian's father is notable for having translated the Second Book of Kings from the Bible into the Manx language for Bishop Mark Hildesley, published in 1771. Thomas was John's second son, born in 1753. He showed early academic promise, as testified by Bishop Hildesley, although the Bishop was disappointed upon first meeting him:

Young Christian got to me the day before the snow ... I find he is almost a blank paper, notwithstanding the vast cries up of his vehement scholarship. His uncle sent me a list of books he had read, enough to frighten a learned Jew. He is tolerably versed in Greek Testament. But it is time he should know things as well as words

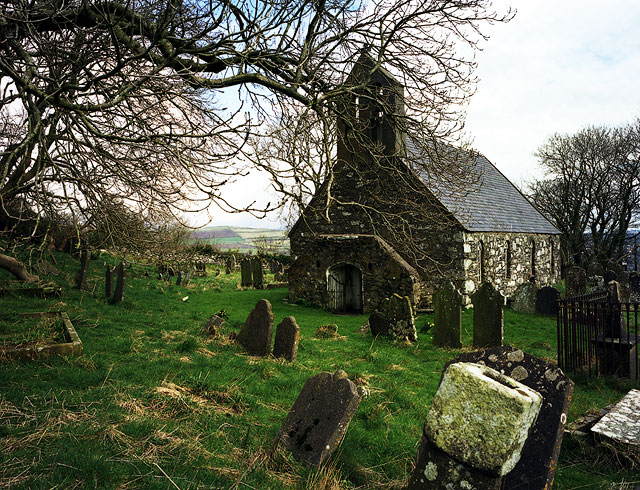
Marown Old Church, Isle of Man

In 1768 or 1769 he was appointed Vicar of Peel. However, Christian was disappointed by this position as he saw as insufficient for him. But his complaints were quieted by Bishop Hildesley's pointing out that "his several appointments" brought him no less than £65 Manx, nearly £56 Sterling.

After his father's death in September 1779, Christian became Vicar of Marown, moving into the manse at Ballakilley and taking up the post of Vicar in 1780. He thus followed both his father, John, and grandfather, Thomas, in being Vicar of the Parish, a line which began with his grandfather's appointment in 1734.

However, in 1796 it is recorded that he was "degraded by being dismissed from the Church", perhaps for "fornication and drunken and aggressive behaviour." He was replaced by a John Bridson, and served a suspension from his duties in the parish. An Ecclesiastical Court document concerning Christian in 1790, states:

... having quitted the retirement enjoined him by his Lordship, and returned to the scene of his unfortunate connections, has this day promised to repair to Kirk Bride and submit himself to the guidance of his brother-in-law, the Rev. Wm. Clucas, during the period of his probation.

It was not until 1799 that he finally relinquished the office of Marown Vicar. He lived a further 29 years, to the age of 74, dying on 14 September 1828. One possibly questionable source has it that he died "due to an overdose of a medicine – he having insisted on drinking the whole bottle instead of the prescribed dose."

== Literature ==
=== Pargys Caillit ===
Christian's translation of John Milton's Paradise Lost into Manx was published in 1796, with the Manx title, Pargys Caillit. The book is significant in the history of Manx literature in that it has been described as "the first secular book published in Manx", the previous publications being predominantly translations of the Bible and other religious texts, such as Thomas Christian's father had undertaken.

Because estimates suggest that as much as one third of the Manx population only spoke Manx at this time, with an additional third speaking it significantly better than English, this might be behind the book's great success and long-standing influence. Reports exist of an illiterate female weaver in Dalby in the 1850s being able to recite the poem in its entirety, and a preacher in Laxey being able to recite on demand any passage of the poem.

The first edition was of 120 pages, badly printed on poor paper, with numerous typographical and proof-reading errors. However, the poem's brilliance was evident and a reprint soon followed.

Pargys Caillit was called a translation of Milton's poem on its title page, but due to the significant cuts, changes and additions made by Christian, it is better understood as a retelling of the story. From the original of over 10,500 lines, Pargys Caillit reduced the poem to just over 4,000. The poem is constructed in 10-syllabic couplets and begins with an original introductory section by Christian addressing the Manx people directly:

Ta goull beg sollys skeayley magh er my chree Dy voddyms gynsagh da ny Manninee Yindys mooar to foayst feer joarree daue, As da ashoonyn to jeu er dagh laue.	A small bright ray beams shining on my heart That I may to my countrymen impart A tale of wonder none before did tell, And to the nations on each hand that dwell.

That the expulsion from heaven is told in only a few lines in Pargys Caillit is one of the most striking changes from Milton's original, though further significant cuts are made to Adam's vision in Books XI and XII of Milton's original. Other omissions, re-structuring and alterations are made by Christian throughout. The most significant addition comes in the history of the creation, where over 350 lines are given to the subject by Christian, and in the stories of Behemoth and Leviathan, which were expanded by descriptions taken from the Book of Job.

The continued high estimation of the work is shown by an extensive quote concerning Pargys Caillit in an 1871 guidebook to the Isle of Man, 75 years after the poem's first publication:

According to a well-known Manx scholar all the finest passages have been translated, and all the 'nonsense' has been suppressed. On my asking him where the nonsense is to be found, he replied, "Teet, there’s a dale of nonsense in the English pome. I mane the foolish tales about Adam and Eve coortin' and suchlike. There’s none of that nonsense in the Manx pote-ry – no inteet. A dale of Milton's Paradise Lost is nauthin' in the world but thrash. The Manx translation is far shoo-pay-re-er – partickerly those parts of the pome tellin' about the fights between the divvels and the angels. – Yes, inteet. Ay, man, it’s ray-ly wun-thin-ful – it’s grandgrand uncommon!”

=== Carvals ===
Thomas Christian is also considered to be the author of a number of Manx carvals (long rhymed carols in Manx, traditionally sung at the "Oiel Verrey" service on Christmas Eve). Two of these are extant and widely considered to have been written by Christian before the publication of Pargys Caillit.

'Cre haghyrt mee roish yn ullick shoh chaih' was collected in A. W. Moore's 1891 book, Carvalyn Gailckagh ('Manx Carols'), as was 'Roish my row yn seihll shoh crooit' (Before this world was created), which was subsequently published by Mr. P. W. Caine, in the "Manx Examiner" in July 1915. The latter was published originally in around 1790 and is considered to be amongst the finest composed of all Manx carvals. The poem is a condensed version of Paradise Lost and contains many lines which were to reappear in a very similar form in Pargys Caillit. The following extract is an example of such lines:

Roish My Row Flaunys Er Ny Chroo / Before The Heavens Were Created (extract)
Roish my row flaunys, er ny chroo Ny ainleyn sollys, kiaddit ayn, Roish my row soit er-lheh yn stoo Glen hug eh'n mirril, shoh gys kione, Cre eicht v'ayn? Cre eicht v'ayn? Na mooar feen ronsagh er y hon. Roish my row soilshey, eayst ny ghrian, Ny rollage hollys heose chyndaa Ny whilleen pooar, ayns niau soilshean, As ren towse kiart gys oie as las, Cre eisht va? Cre eisht va? 'Cre v'ayn my row imbagh, ny traa.	Before heaven was created Or bright angels were formed in it Before the substance was specially placed Clean he brought this miracle to an end What then existed? What then existed? Would it not be greatly worth researching for it? Before there was light, moon or sun Or bright star above turning Or so much power shining in heaven And gave the correct measure to night and day What then was? What then was? What existed before season or time?
