= Keppel Gate, Isle of Man =

Keppel Gate
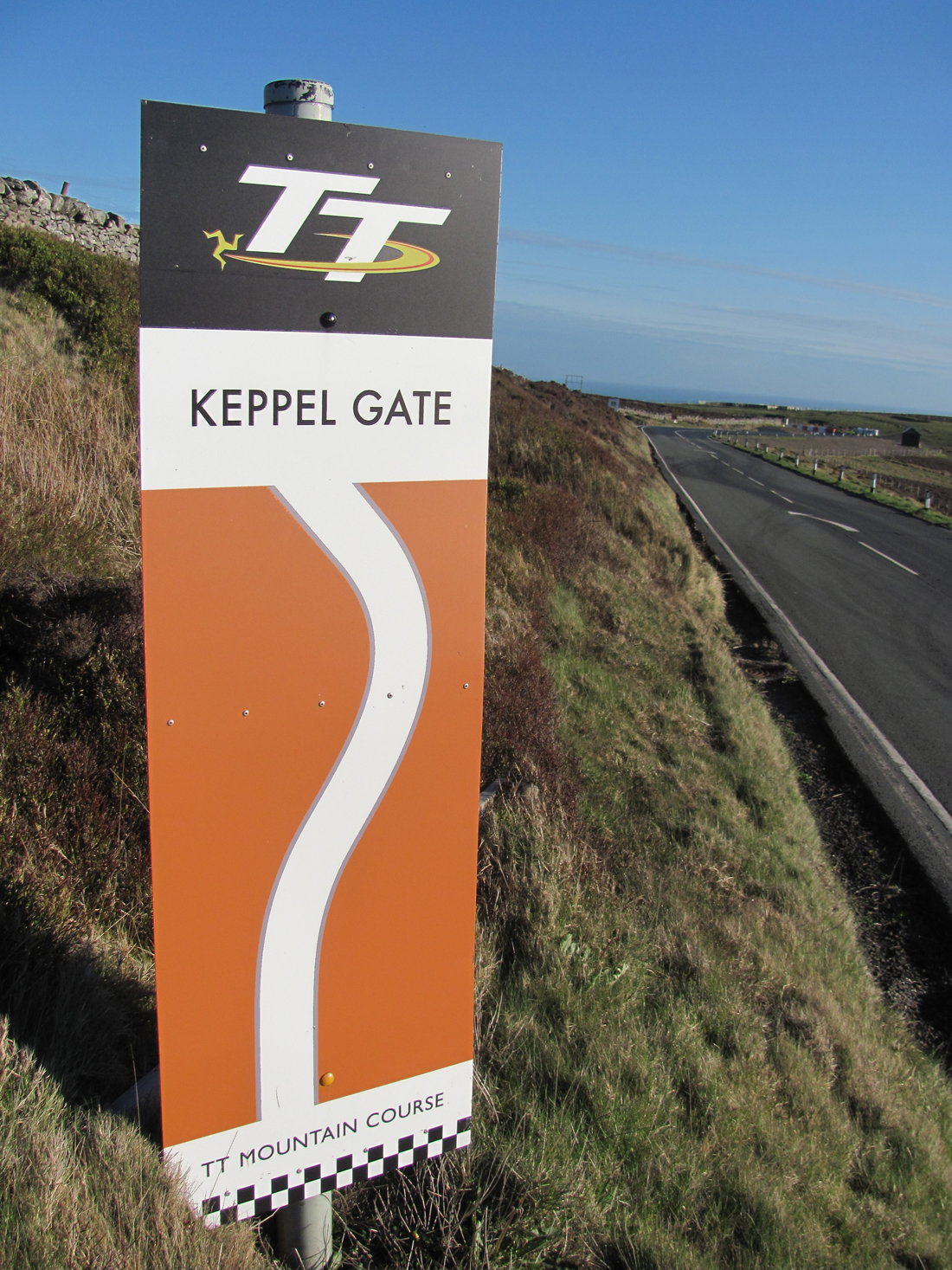
- Keppel Gate sign on the A18 Snaefell Mountain Road with a south-east aspect looking towards Slieau Ree mountain and Keppel Gate.

- Location within Isle of Man
- 54°12′50.9″N 4°28′47.1″W

History
- Built: 1864–1866, 1894-1896 1921-22, 1992, 2015

Keppel Gate, Isle of Man (locally /ˈkɛpəlˈɡəɪtˈ/) is part of a former UK HM Commissioners of Woods and Forest estate, including a series of former highway mountain gates. It is now Common land in public ownership and is one of three purpose built former Crown Road sections of the A18 Snaefell Mountain Road used for the Isle of Man TT races. The area of Keppel Gate including a nearby private residence of Kate's Cottage at the adjacent 34th TT Milestone road-side marker is located between the 4th Milestone and 5th Milestone road-side markers on the primary A18 Snaefell Mountain Road in the parish district of Kirk Onchan in the Isle of Man.

== Location and description ==
The ridge line of Keppel Gate is part of a large area of former Crown Commons grazing mountain land known as 'Slieau Lhoost.' It is an area of uncultivated upland Mountain Land adjacent to the mountain summits of Slieau Ree (Manx: Mountain of Heather) at a height of 316 metres (1,037 ft) above sea-level and the nearby hillside of Slieau Meayl (Manx: bare, barren mountain).

The area of Keppel Gate and Slieau Ree mountain consist of acid grassland, heath and hillside fell with views of Baldwin Valley in the parish of Kirk Braddan and the nearby Beinn-y-Phott Mountain.

== Area of Special Scientific Interest ==
The Isle of Man Wild Life Act (1990) permits order the foundation of different types of "Areas of Special Scientific Interest" in the Isle of Man for wildlife, land, coastal or marine environments. This includes sections of the North Atlantic sub-montane heath found on different sections of Mountain Lands in the Isle of Man as a European Union community "priority habitat", as described by Annex 1 of the EU Habitats Directive and also the UK Guidelines for Selection of Biological Specific Scientific Interest (SSSI's).

The heath and heather moorland of the Northern Uplands of the type found at Keppel Gate, including Slieau Ree Mountain and Kate's Cottage is an Area of Specific Scientific Interest (ASSI) and further nearby sections of mountain land at Keppel Gate are defined as a "biodiversity" and a upland conservation "hot-spot."

== Origin of the name ==
There are a number of alternative etymologies for the meaning of the name for Keppel Gate (archaic Kippal Gate). The name may have originated from (Old Norse: Kapel Gata) "....the road to the summit...." or Old Norse: Kapal Gata 'the Horse Road' from Kapall meaning a horse or nag from Late Latin 'caballus' or Manx: cabyl.

Additional meanings is that the name Keppel Gate originates from the Scandinavian for Old Norse: Kappafjall (The Champion or Hero's mountain). or old Norse Old Norse: keppa-fjall) "Kippal Gate, 'big-trunk, stock, post hill, or looked like a tree-stump'" The name 'Gata' is adopted from Scandinavian meaning a farm lane, path or road. It is also found in Northern England as '-gata' as a street name from Middle English such as Deansgate in Manchester or Micklegate in the city of York adopted as the homonym 'gate' meaning a street, road or land for grazing.

== A18 Snaefell Mountain Road ==
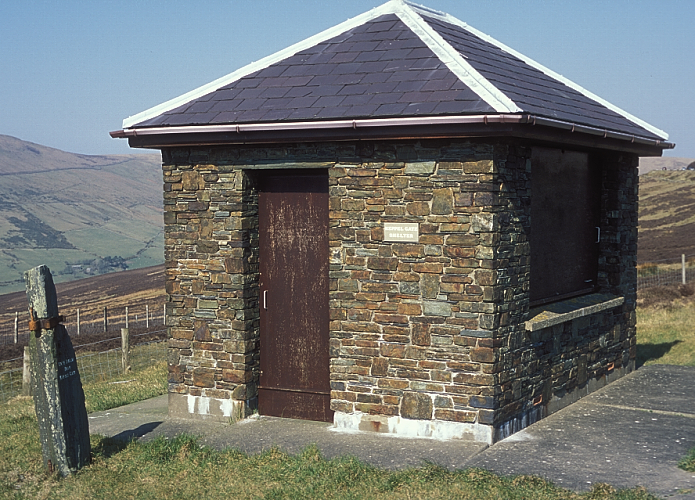
TT Race Marshal's Shelter at Keppel Gate with an old stone gate-post

The section of the A18 Snaefell Mountain Road from Keppel Gate to Park Llewellyn near the Gooseneck corner, Ramsey was built on former Crown Commons and Commoners allotments mountain grazing land. This land was purchased by the UK Crown following the sale of the feudal rights held by the former Lord of Mann, the 3rd Duke of Atholl after the Act of Revestment in 1765 and sale of remaining property and manorial rights passed on to his son John Murray, 4th Duke of Atholl for £417,144 in 1824.

The A18 Snaefell Mountain Road reflects typical 19th century highway and railway construction practices. Built over a period of time in the Nineteenth century from a number of horse paths, ancient rights of way of the Regiam Viam (Royal Way) (archaic|Manx: Bayr-yn-Ree) and a series of pre-existing carting-tracks and incomplete stone mountain paths which traversed mountain land, peat bogs and hillside sections. The Keppel Gate section is situated between the 4th milestone and 5th milestone markers on the A18 Snaefell Mountain Road of the small and larger metal 'Garrow' type of markers from the period of James Garrow as Survey-General of Isle of Man Highways and Roads.

The Disafforesting Commission of 1860 allowed for the sale of parcels of land in 1863 for the purpose of building and fencing of new mountain road sections on Crown Common lands partly financed by the land sales and by a financial contribution from the HM Commissioners of Woods and Forest. The Ordnance Survey of 1867-8 shows a further section of road built in the period of 1864-66 from the Creg-ny-Baa corner that traversed the steep 'Keppel' or Slieau Ree mountain which dominates this area of the A18 Snaefell Mountain Road to the site of a former Shepherd's Hut near to Kate's Cottage. The new 'Keppel Gate Road' by-passed a section of the former right of way (Manx: Creg-ny-Bayr) now part of public footpath to the Windy Corner on the A18 Snaefell Mountain Road.

The Crown Commons land at Keppel Gate (known as 'Slieau Lhoost' or the Cairns) of 1,165 acres was purchased from the HM Commissioners of Woods and Forest by the Isle of Man Government for a price of £2,000 in 1933 for the purpose of fencing of the A18 Snaefell Mountain Road and the removal of two mountain gates at Keppel Gate for the 1934 Isle of Man TT races. The remaining HM Crown Common lands were purchased by the Isle of Man Common Lands Board for the Isle of Man Government in 1947. The tenancy for hill-sheep grazing at Keppel Gate was operated by the Mountain Shepherd G. Rhodes Tate from 1926 including a further grazing tenancy at Beinn-y-Phott mountain and with his wife Gladys Tate occupied Keppel Gate Cottage or 'Tate's Cottage,' now known as 'Kate's Cottage.'

== Motor sport heritage ==
The Keppel Gate section of the A18 Snaefell Mountain Road was part of the 52.15 mile Highland Course (revised to 40.38 miles in 1906) used for automobile racing including the 1904 Gordon Bennett Trial and the RAC Tourist Trophy car races held between 1905 and 1907. The course was modified again in 1908 as the 37.50 Mile Four Inch Course for the RAC Tourist Trophy car races held in the Isle of Man between 1908 and 1922.

In 1911 the Four Inch Course was first used by the Auto-Cycling Union for the Isle of Man TT motorcycle races. This included the Keppel Gate section and the course later became known as the 37.73 mile Isle of Man TT Mountain Course for motor-cycle racing which has been used since 1911 for the Isle of Man TT and from 1923 for the "Mountain Course" for the Manx Grand Prix races.

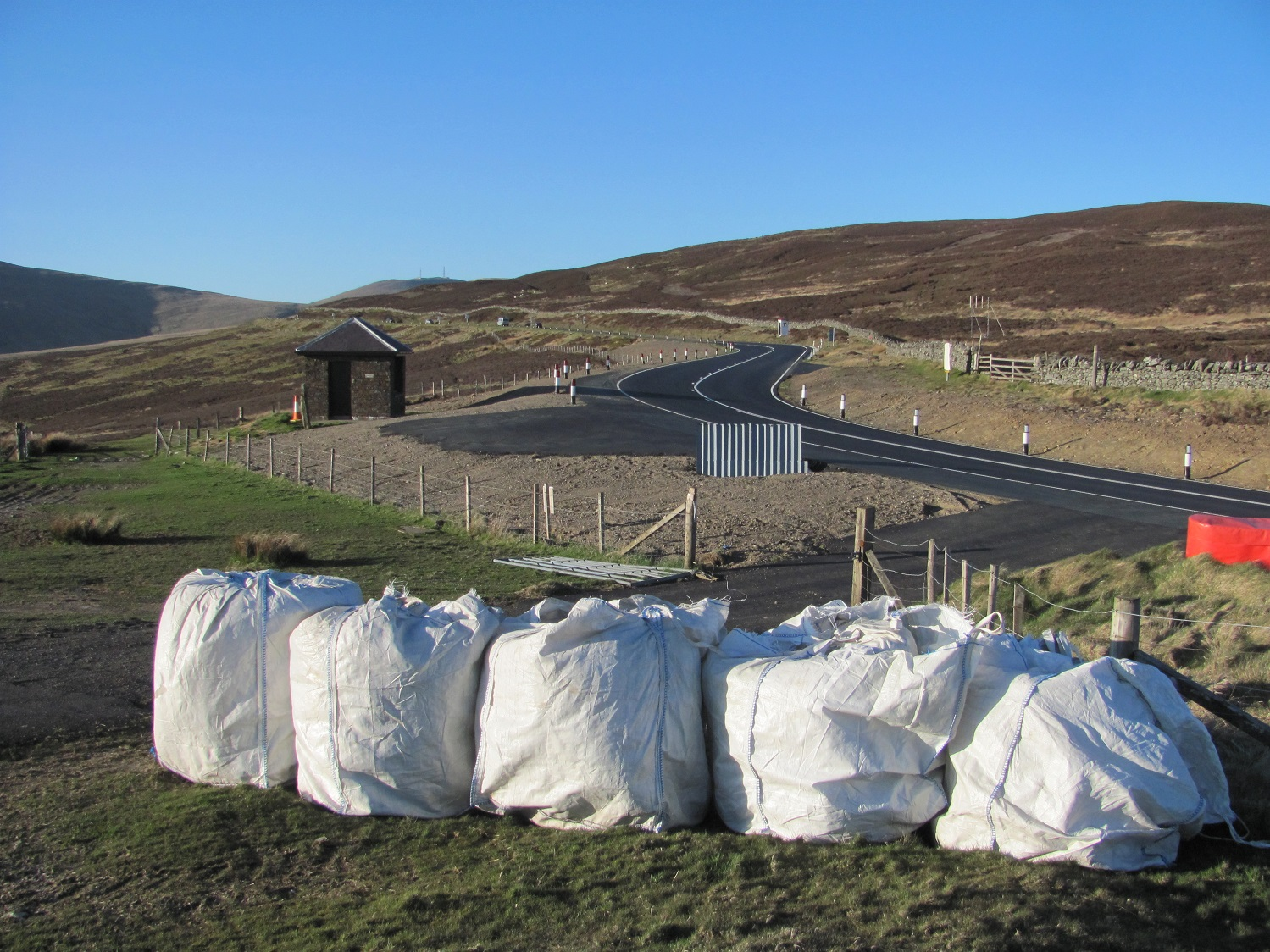
Keppel Gate and Keppel Park showing the 2015 landscaping.

== Keppel Gate redevelopment 1921–1922 and the Isle of Man TT races ==
The Auto-Cycle Union proposed in 1921 to move the Isle of Man TT Races to the Continental Circuit de Spa-Francorchamps in Belgium. After an offer made by the Belgium Government the move was considered by the Auto-Cycle Union due to financial reasons, organisational problems and criticism of the Isle of Man TT Mountain Course.

In response to the problems with the Isle of Man TT Course highlighted by the Auto-Cycle Union, the Isle of Man Highway Board redeveloped large sections of A18 Snaefell Mountain Road. This included the often criticised very narrow section of road from the Windy Corner to Keppel Gate. The old stone mountain track from near Slieau Lhoost Quarry adjacent to Windy Corner across the mountainside to Keppel Gate was subjected to substantial redevelopment and landscaping during the period 1921-23 including the removal of the old Keppel Gate corner for the 1922 Isle of Man TT Races.

== Road safety ==
The section of A18 Snaefell Mountain Road from the Thirty-Third Corner to near Keppel Gate was widened and road-side fence post relocated below road level for the 1947 Isle of Man TT Races after a fatal accident to Peter M. Aitchison a competitor during the 1946 Senior Manx Grand Prix. A road-works construction scheme by the Highways Division of the Isle of Man Department of Highways, Ports and Properties occurred during the winter months of 1991-92 when the A18 Snaefell Mountain Road was closed between the Windy Corner and Keppel Gate to replace the tarmacadam foundations built during the early 1920s.

The Keppel Gate section of A18 Mountain Road was subject to road re-surfacing work during the winter of 2006–2007 with a high-grip 'Shell-mac' road surface for road-racing by the Isle of Man Department of Transport. In August 2009, before the 2009 Manx Grand Prix, a section of grass bank was removed from the southern side of Keppel Gate to provide a run-off area after an evening practice crash by the Australian Isle of Man TT race winner Cameron Donald and a further incident involving a TT Travelling Marshal, John McBride, during the 2009 Isle of Man TT races. In April 2015, the Highways Section of the Isle of Man Department of Infrastructure instigated a programme of landscaping at Keppel Gate corner, including the removal of a section of grass bank on the north-eastern side of the corner, road re-profiling, re-structuring and re-surfacing work.
