= Injebreck =

- Hamlet
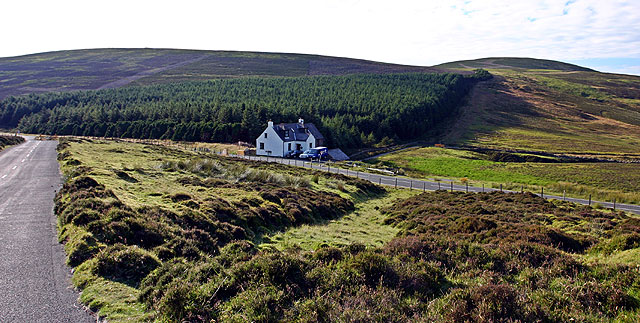
- The cottage at the top of Injebreck

- Location within Isle of Man
- Coordinates: 54°13′56.69″N 4°31′24.7″W
- Country: United Kingdom
- Dependency: Isle of Man

Area
  - Total: 0.76 sq mi (1.98 km^{2})
  - Land: 0.73 sq mi (1.88 km^{2})
  - Water: 0.039 sq mi (0.1 km^{2})
- Elevation: 712 ft (217 m)

Injebreck is a small hamlet nestled in a deep valley in the central mountains of the Isle of Man, 1.69 kilometres (1.05 mi), as the crow flies, from Injebreck Reservoir. It consists of a small farm and a plantation of mainly Sitka Spruce and Japanese Larch but in 1990, 1.7 hectares (4.2 acres) were restocked with Douglas Fir, Scots pine, Hybrid Larch and a selection of mixed broadleaves. It was once the site of some highly popular Victorian pleasure grounds.

== See also ==
- Injebreck Reservoir
- List of places in the Isle of Man
