= Greeba River =

River on the Isle of Man

Location
- Country: Isle of Man

Physical characteristics
- Source: Cooilslieu
  - coordinates: 54.209°N 4.592°W
  - elevation: 150 m (490 ft)
- Mouth: Confluence with River Dhoo
  - coordinates: 54.182°N 4.575°W
- Length: 4.5 km (2.8 mi)

The Greeba River is a river in the Isle of Man.

Rising on Greeba Mountain above Kerrow Glass and Cooilslieu, the river runs south and east through the village of Greeba and past Greeba Castle before joining the River Dhoo just west of Crosby.
