= River Douglas (Isle of Man) =

River on the Isle of Man

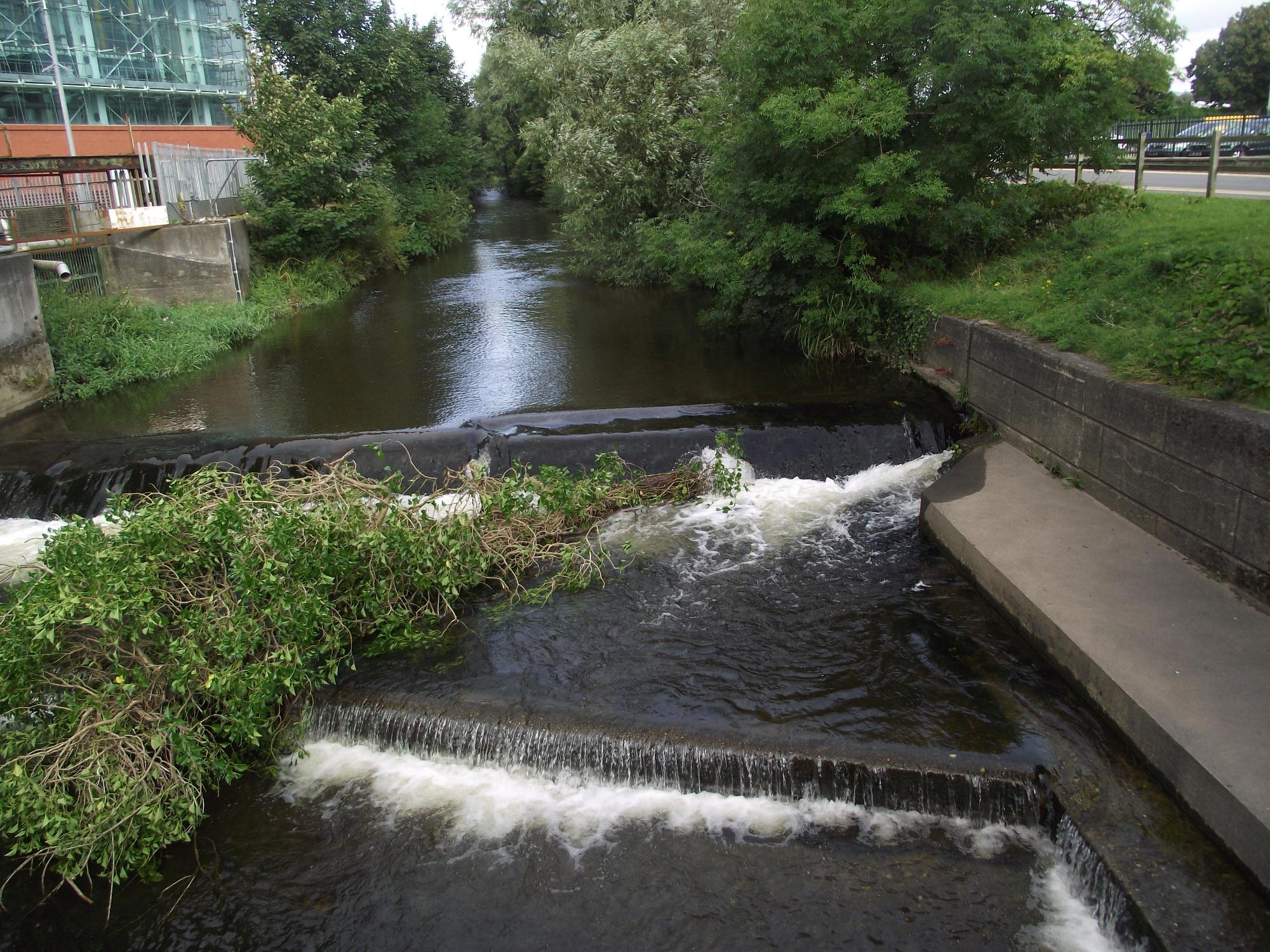

Location
- Country: Isle of Man
- City: Douglas

Physical characteristics
- Source: Confluence of River Glass & River Dhoo
  - coordinates: 54.151°N 4.502°W
  - elevation: 13 m (43 ft)
- Mouth: Douglas Harbour
  - coordinates: 54.146°N 4.471°W
  - elevation: 0 m (0 ft)
- Length: 2.3 km (1.4 mi)

The River Douglas is a river on the Isle of Man. The river begins on the outskirts of Douglas where the River Glass and River Dhoo meet. The river contains trout and salmon in the late summer.
