= Port-Ny-Ding =

Coordinates: 54.095921°N 4.769458°W

Port-Ny-Ding is a small bay at grid reference 188708, about 1 km north-west of Bradda West (the northern end of Port Erin) on the Isle of Man. According to the map, it can probably be seen from Raad ny Foillan. The bay is in Rushen parish district and the closest village is Port Erin.

== Toponymy ==
The origin of the name appears to be lost in obscurity.

- According to A W Moore, the name comes from Port-ny-King ("Port of the Heads").
- However in volume six (Sheading of Rushen) of Prof. George Broderick's Placenames of the Isle of Man (pp. 478–479) he gives a possible meaning of the place name (he spells the first element as purt) as "Harbour of the daughter of ?Ding", but says that the last element is obscure, unless it is a nickname.

== See also ==
- Geography of the Isle of Man
- List of places in the Isle of Man
