= Old St Runius, Marown =

Church in Marown, Isle of Man

St Runius Church
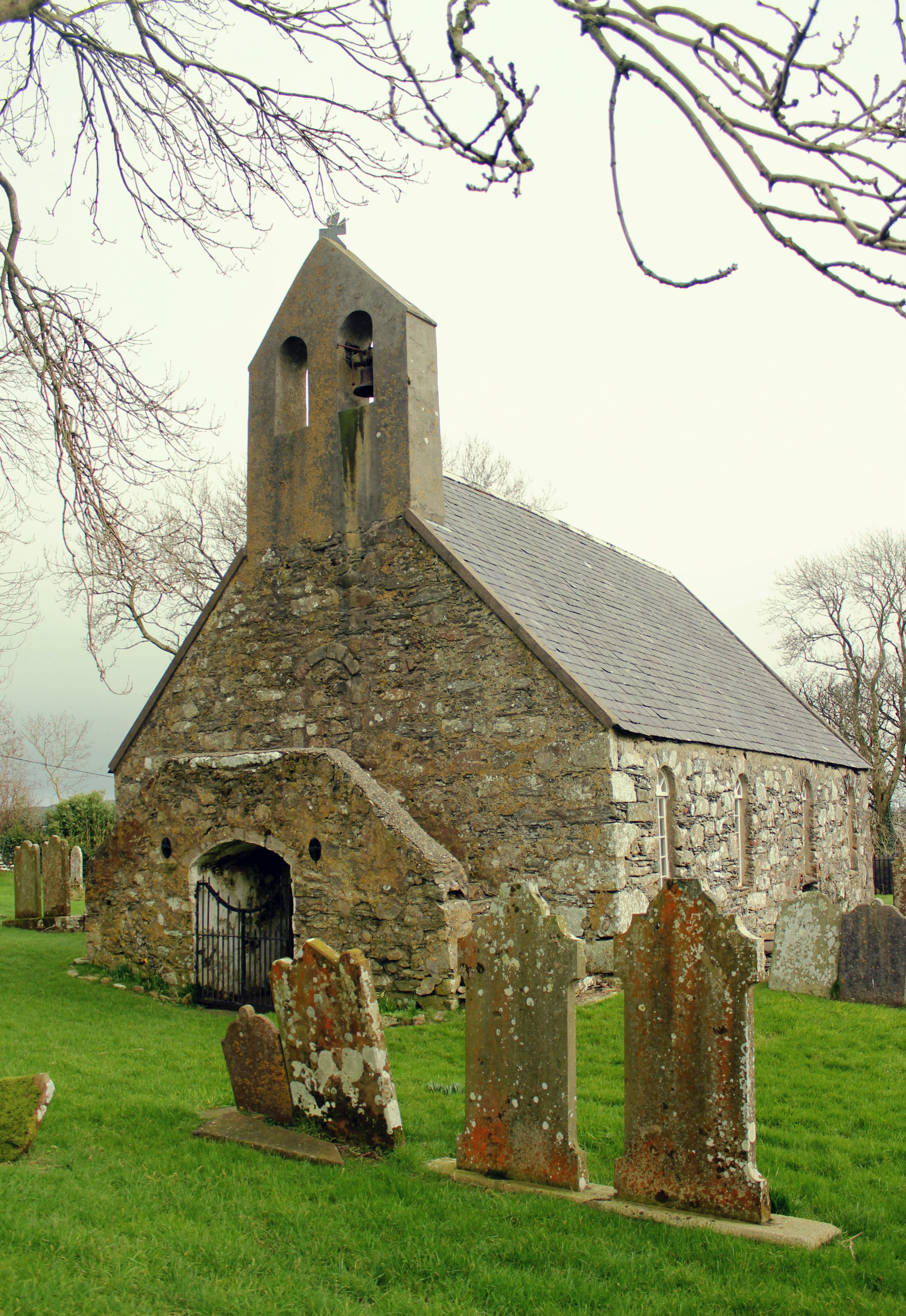
- St Runius, Marown, Isle of Man

- 54.17629°N 4.57317°W
- Location: Marown, Isle of Man.
- Country: Isle of Man
- Denomination: Church of England
- Tradition: Church of England / Roman Catholic
- Website: greatenglishchurches.co.uk/html/marown_old_church.html

History
- Status: Occasional usage
- Founded: 12th century
- Dedication: Ma Rooney (St Runius)
- Consecrated: 12th century

Architecture
- Functional status: Inactive
- Style: Manx Chapel
- Groundbreaking: 12th century

Administration
- Diocese: Diocese of Sodor and Man
- Parish: Marown

St Runius, Marown ("Old Marown Church") dates to the 12th century and was the parish church of Marown until 1853. Today it only holds services for special occasions.

== History ==
Dedicated to Ma Rooney (St Runius), the church was built in around 1200, but was altered in 1754. Evident remains of the original smaller building can be seen in the eastern half of the church today. The original door of the early church was in the south wall, and it is still visible in the outside of the church today. The absence of windows in the northern wall, although notable today, was common in the 12th century.

The church was altered and extended towards the west by about 5 m from 1750 to 1755. The moulded jamb-stones in the church were taken for the purpose from the early St Trinian's, also in the same parish. Another feature was the western gallery for musicians, including violins and flutes, which would have stood over the modern doorway. The stone steps outside the building gave access to this gallery.

In 1853 the church was displaced as the parish church for Marown by the church opened on the main A1 Douglas - Peel Road, which was also dedicated to St Runius. At this time Old St Runius was used as a mortuary chapel; this led to a part of the east end being demolished, and a door constructed.,

Although the church continued to be used for special services, it fell into disrepair and it was only after restoration by volunteers that it could be reopened on 9 August 1959. Although no regular services are now held at the church, it remains open and services are held for special occasions.

It a registered building.

== Features ==
The church holds a number of early examples of Christian crosses, dating back as far as the 7th century. The best preserved of these crosses was only discovered when the doorway was heightened and the slab was found to be in use as the lintel.

== Significant persons connected to the church ==
- Captain John Quilliam was baptised here.
- Thomas Christian was vicar here.
- Bishop Lonnan was possibly buried here.
- Bishop Connaghan was possibly buried here.
- Bishop Runius was possibly buried here.

== Gallery ==
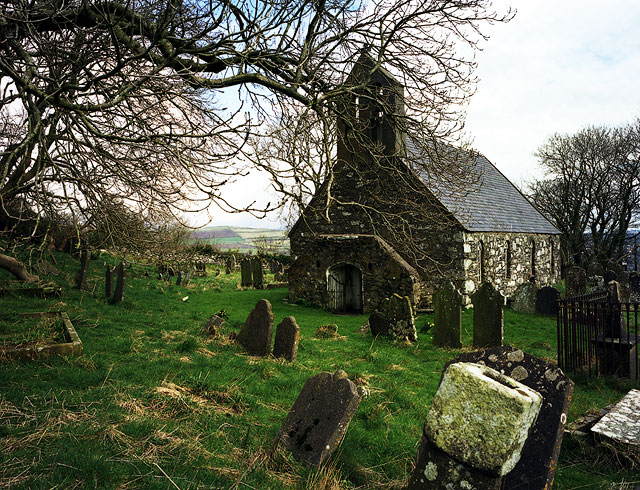

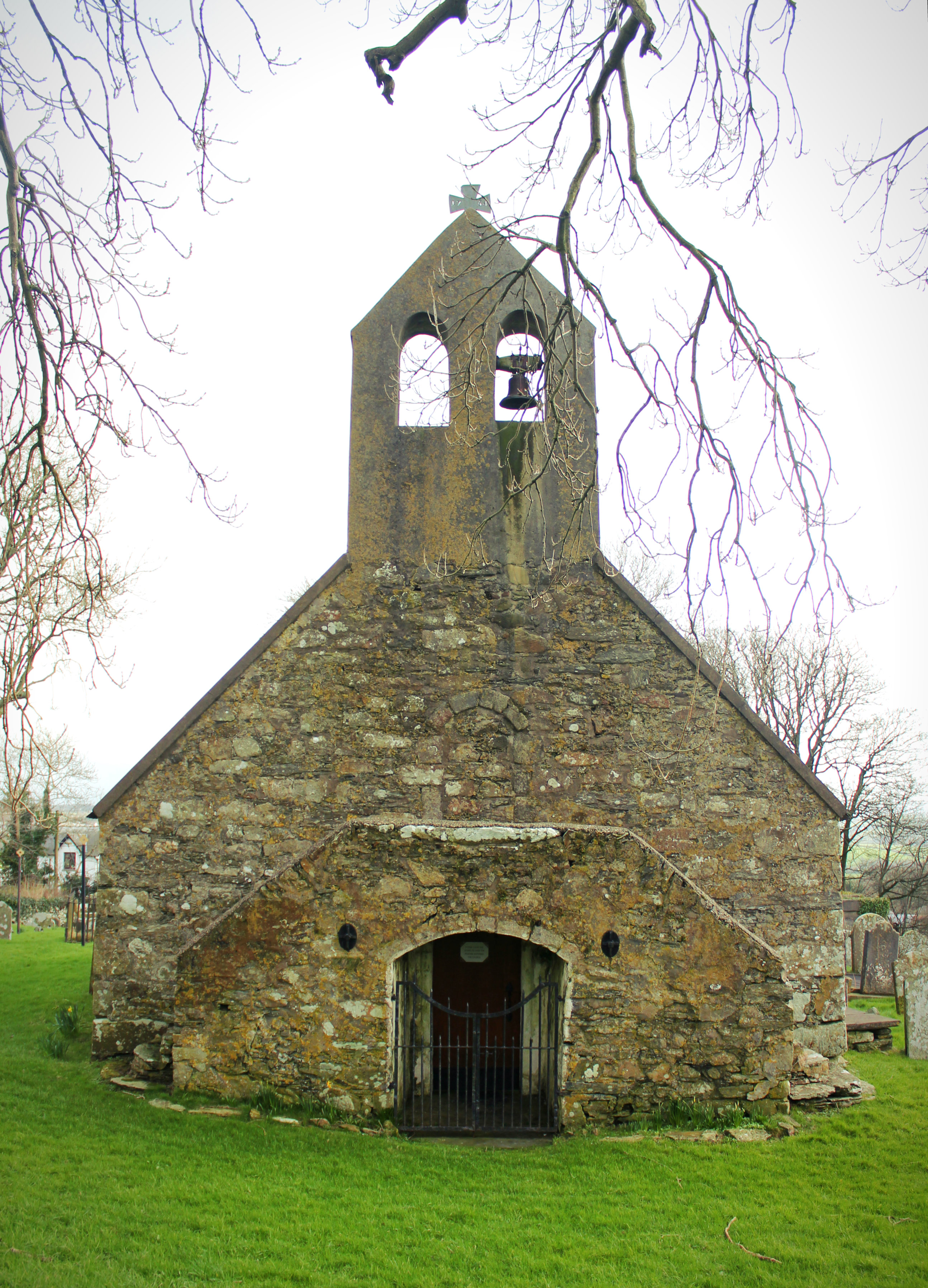

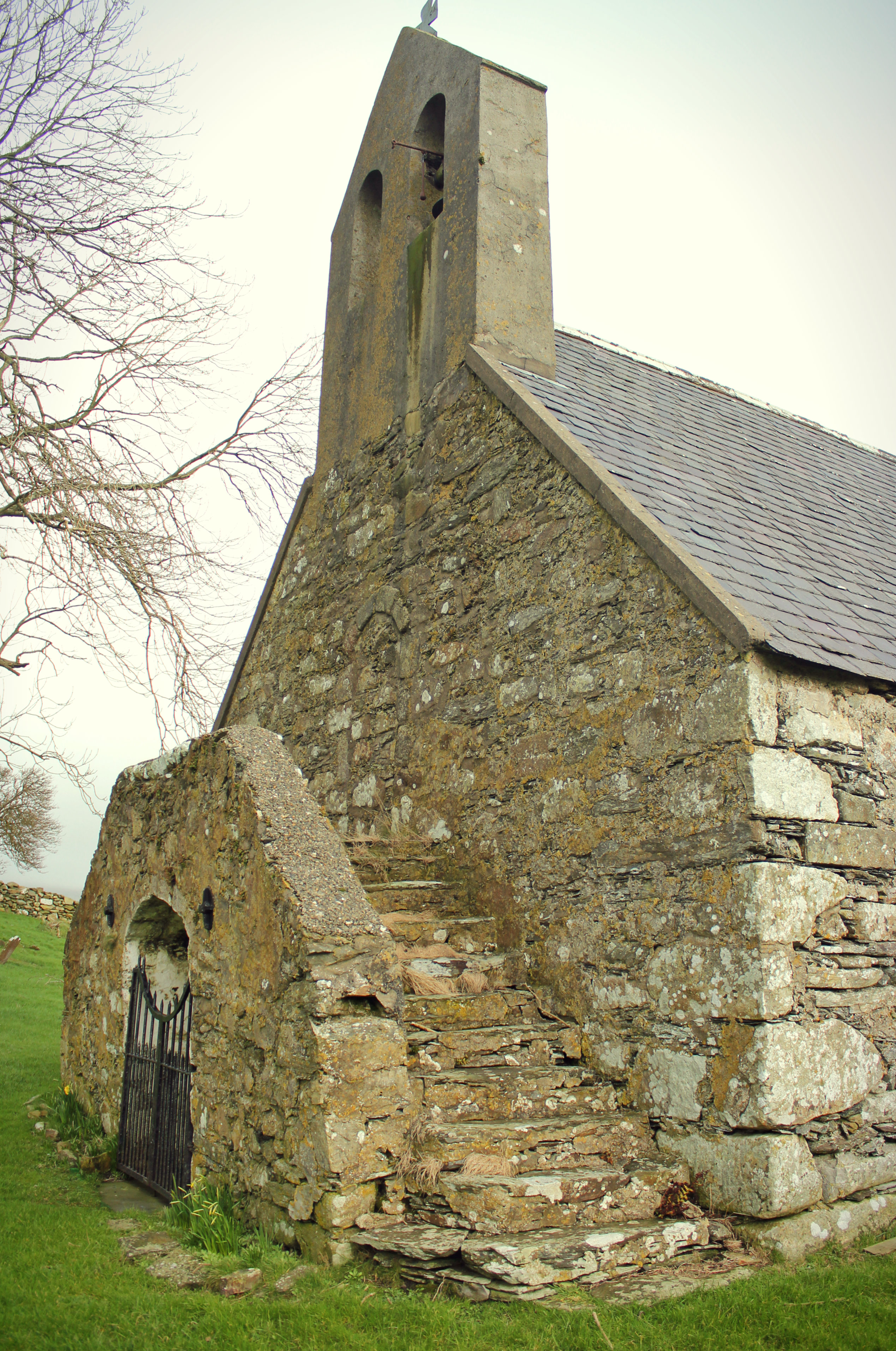

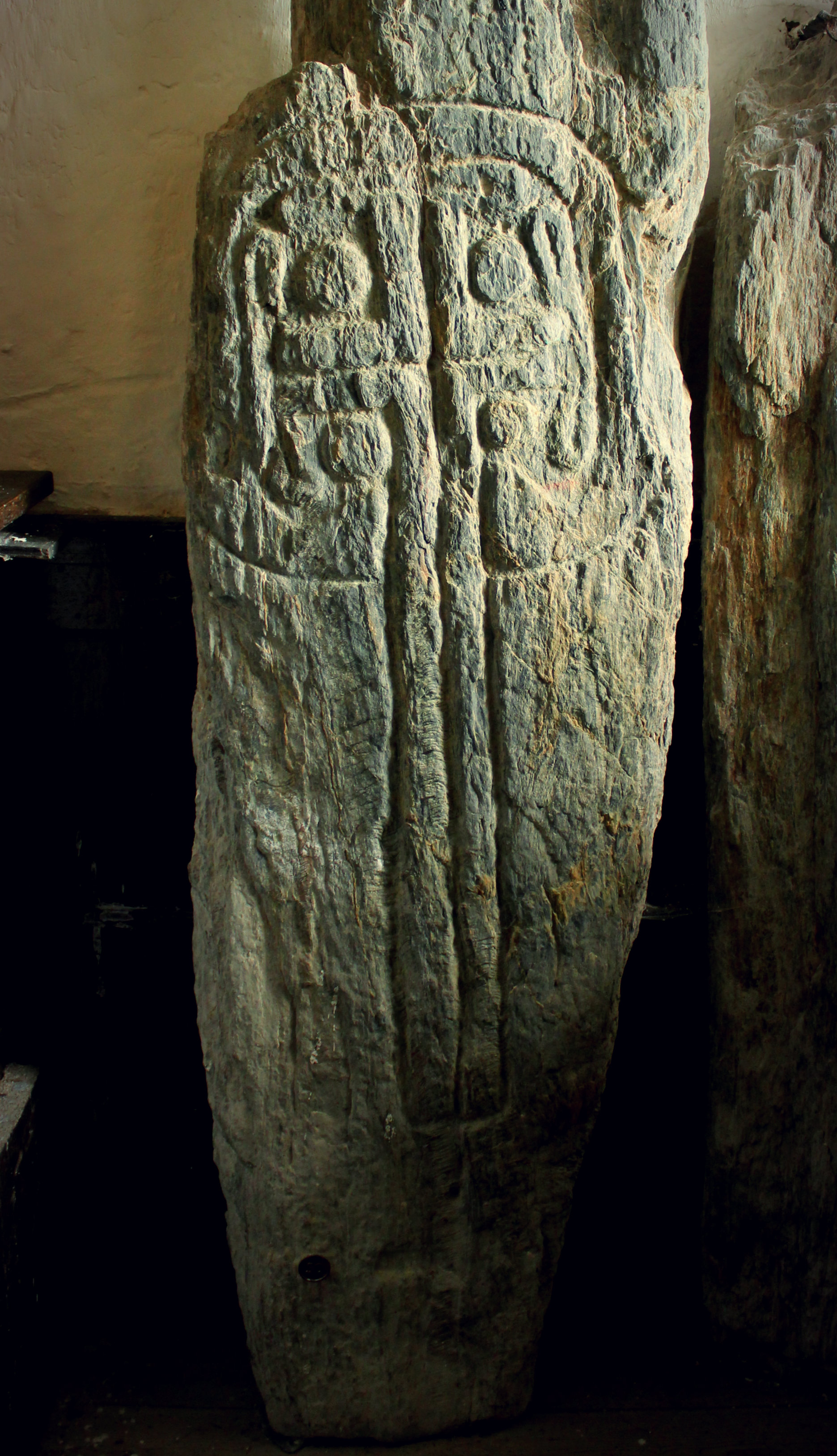

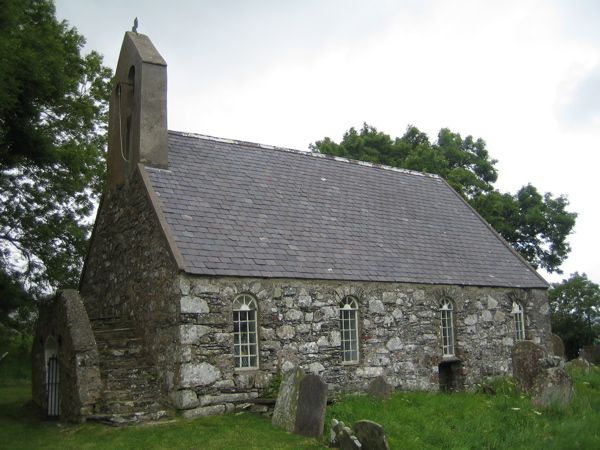

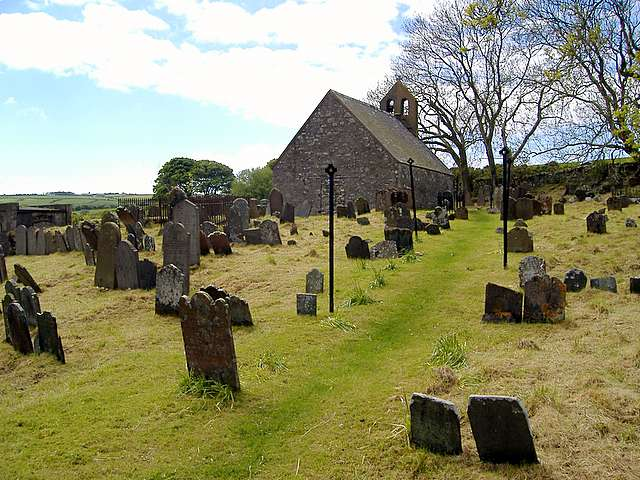

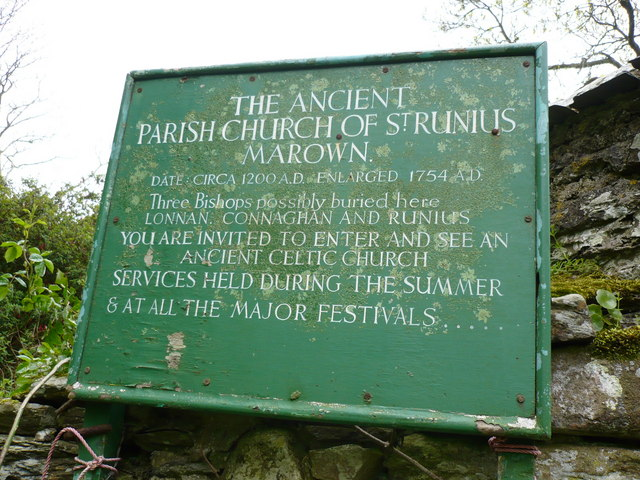
