= Keeill =

Chapel

Keeill (also keill, keeil; plural kialteenyn or keeills) is a specific type of small simple chapel found on the Isle of Man and built between the 6th and 12th centuries.

== Etymology ==
The word is a borrowing from Manx Gaelic where it means 'chapel'. The term is ultimately from the Latin cella, which originally meant a storeroom, or a small room. In both English, and the Goidelic languages, the word was borrowed in the sense of a monastic cell.

== History and siting ==
Some similar sites have been identified on Islay and Gallarus Oratory.

The earliest versions of the structures are all thought to have been lost, and only their later replacements (mostly in use between the 8th and 12th centuries) survive. These survivors vary in size and arrangement, and include examples constructed in unhewn or roughly worked stones, stone-revetted turf and timber-laced rubble. Beneath some sites remnants of clay daub have been found (Megaw 1978:298), while traces of wall plaster have also been discovered. Keeills may have fallen out of use following the arrival of Viking settlers on the Island, but were then re-established, on the same sites in some cases, once the Vikings had converted to Christianity.

A number of keeills were built on a natural or artificial mound, often the site of earlier burials or monuments (e.g. Bronze-Age barrow mounds) (Lowe and Reilly 1988) and/or near a spring or holy well (a chibbyr). Many keeills are surrounded by cemeteries, some of which may have originated in pagan society. Some keeills are enclosed by a turf bank. The area of ground bounded by such a bank can vary considerably and may represent earlier, pre-Christian use.

== Number ==
At least 174 keeills have been recorded on the Island, out of probably over 200, though only 35 can be easily identified today. Records are made up of extant sites, potential remains, place-name records and folk memory. The nature of some of this evidence is sufficient to cast doubt on the reliability of the total record. Most of the sites have either been lost (e.g. when a later medieval church such as Kirk Maughold or Kirk Christ Malew was built on top of or in place of one), or destroyed when excavated by Victorian and Edwardian antiquarians looking for ground plans and treasure rather than stratigraphy and finds.

== Size, layout and comparisons ==
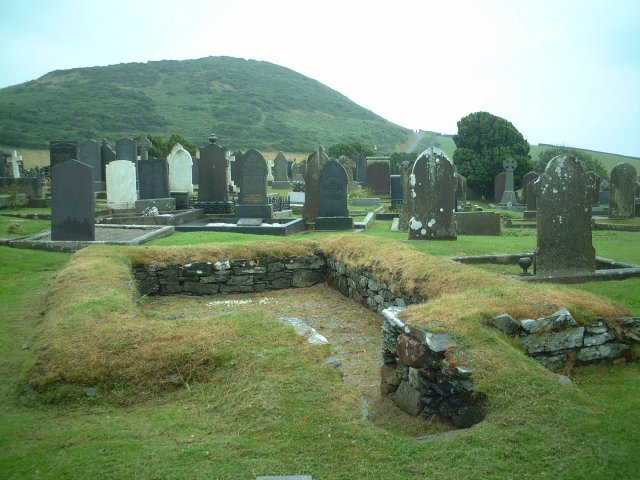
Keeill in Maughold churchyard. One of three Keeills in this churchyard.

While different keeills were broadly similar in their layout they varied considerably in size.

Carl J. S. Marstrander, a Norwegian professor who carried out what remains the most extensive survey of keeills on the Isle of Man in the 1930s, described this variation:

The Ballachrink keeill in Marown measures only 10 feet × 6 feet inside. Otherwise they may attain 23 feet × 13 feet (Keeill Vian, Lonan), even 57 feet × 18 feet (St Patrick's Chapel, Patrick's Isle), and 75 feet × 24 feet (St. Trinian's, Marown). The walls vary in thickness from 2 feet 4 inches to 4 feet 8 inches and are, on the outside, protected by an embankment of earth and stones, in height 2-5 feet, in depth 4-10 feet.

Marstrander's inclusion of the notably larger structures he mentions here is now deprecated, in view of their later date.

...The shape is rectangular with no division between nave and chancel. The door, which is narrow and tapering towards the top, is usually situated in the western gable. The window – as a rule only one – is built at a height of 2-3 feet above the floor. The altar is invariably placed against the eastern wall, attaining a height of about 2 feet.

Detailed work drawing comparisons with sites in the Northern Isles has been undertaken by Lowe (1987), and with those on Islay, by Swift (1987).

== Time Team ==
The keeill excavated in 2007 by Time Team fitted into Marstrander's general pattern, in terms of walls, rectangular shape, lack of identifiable internal divisions, and having a single narrow entrance and an eastern altar.

== See also ==
- St Trinian's Church, also known as "Keeil Brisht" (broken church)
- Registered Buildings of the Isle of Man
- Keills Chapel, Argyll, Scotland
