= Speed limits in the Isle of Man =

Speed limits in the Isle of Man are measured in miles per hour, and the same basic design of road signs is used as in the United Kingdom.

As a self-governing British Crown Dependency outside the United Kingdom, the island's parliament can enact its own legislation, including road traffic laws such as speed limits and the power to close roads to allow races such as the Isle of Man TT to take place.

There is normally no national speed limit in the Isle of Man: some roads may be driven at any speed which is safe and appropriate. In built-up areas a speed limit of 30 mph (48 km/h) usually applies. There is a 20 mph speed limit in some local areas.

Careless and dangerous driving laws still apply, so one may not drive at absolutely any speed, and there are local speed limits on many roads. Many unrestricted roads have frequent bends which even the most experienced driver cannot see round. Drivers are limited to 50 miles per hour (80 km/h) in the first full year after passing their driving test (Isle of Man citizens are permitted to start driving at the age of sixteen) and some are not used to having to make progress in the same way as on a larger road network such as that in the UK: even a cautious driver can get from anywhere in the island to anywhere else in no more than sixty minutes.

Set against this is a strong culture of motor sport enthusiasm; many residents familiar with the roads are well used to traversing country roads at speeds illegal on similar roads elsewhere. This leads to a very diverse spread of both driving competence and speed. In an official survey in 2006, the introduction of blanket speed limits was refused by the population.

Due to the COVID-19 pandemic, an island-wide temporary speed limit of 40 mph (64 km/h) was introduced in 2020, later increasing to 60mph (97 km/h).

== See also ==
- Speed limits in the United Kingdom
