= Archibald Blaber =

English cricketer

Archibald Blaber (15 December 1867 – 15 May 1905) was an English cricketer who played for Sussex. He was born in Horsted Keynes and died in Cuckfield.

Blaber made two first-class appearances, both in University matches, for the side - the first in 1890 and the second in 1894. He picked up just one wicket with the ball in 25 overs of batting. Twenty-eight of the twenty-nine runs he scored in first-class cricket came when he was pushed further up the order to bat alongside three-time Test batsman Harry Butt.

Blaber appeared in two games for the Sussex Second XI in 1897.
