= Foxdale River =

River on the Isle of Man

Coordinates: 54.1867°N 4.6417°W

The Foxdale River is a river of the Isle of Man which rises east of the South Barrule and flows 5 km north through Foxdale to join the River Neb at St John's.
