= River Dhoo =

River on the Isle of Man

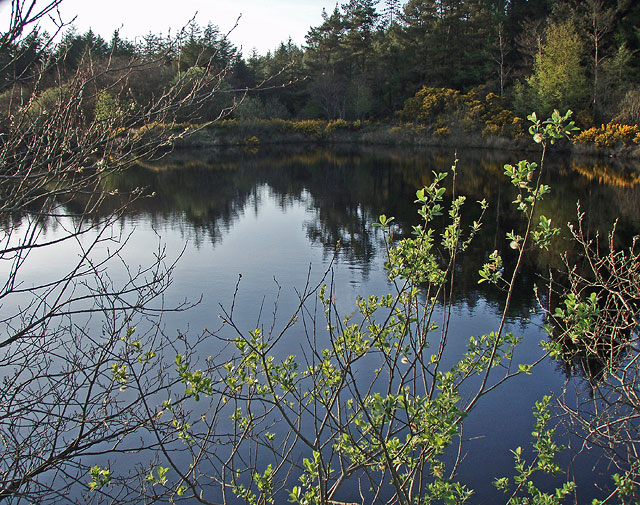
- Native name: Awin Doo (Manx)

Location
- Country: Isle of Man
- Cities: Douglas, Union Mills, Crosby

Physical characteristics
- Source: Archallagan Plantation
  - coordinates: 54.179°N 4.602°W
  - elevation: 160 m (520 ft)
- Mouth: Confluence with River Glass
  - coordinates: 54.151°N 4.502°W
- Length: 10.5 km (6.5 mi)

Basin features
- Tributaries
  - left: Greeba River

The River Dhoo (Manx: Awin Doo) is a river on the Isle of Man. The river rises in Marown and flows east towards Douglas through the central valley of the island, passing Crosby and Union Mills before meeting with the River Glass on the outskirts of Douglas where it flows out to sea through Douglas Harbour. The Dhoo (meaning black or dark in Manx) and the Glass (meaning clear or green) converge to form the River Douglas. It has a length of approx. 6.5 mi (10.5 km).

More recent research suggests that the name is one of the oldest place-names in the island and comes from the early Celtic term 'duboglassio’ meaning 'black/dark stream'. This is a common name throughout the British Isles and is Dulas in Wales and Dawlish in England.

== Wildlife ==
Lampreys, previously thought extinct in the UK, were found in the river 2010. They were also reported in 1981 and 2007. Species present include three-spined stickleback, nine-spined stickleback, minnow, brown trout, and of great conservation concern, European eel and the Atlantic salmon. Additionally, amber listed conservation species present include river lamprey, brook lamprey, and sea trout.
