= Glen Vine =

Coordinates: 54.176°N 4.5554°W

Glen Vine: Manx: Glion Vian
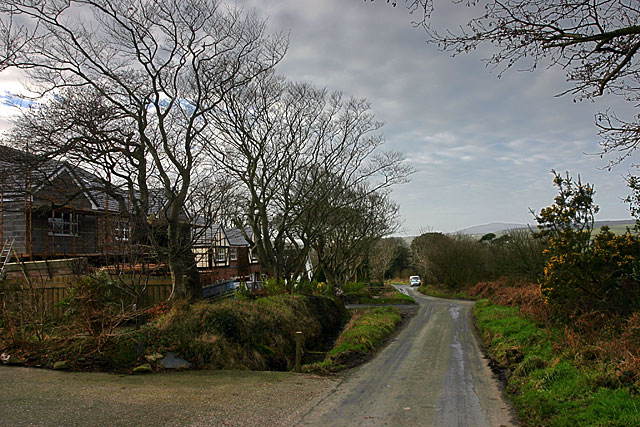
- Road along the edge of the village

- Location within the Isle of Man
- Population: (2006 Census)
- OS grid reference: SC333786
- Parish: Marown
- Sheading: Middle
- Crown dependency: Isle of Man
- Post town: ISLE OF MAN
- Postcode district: IM4
- Dialling code: 01624
- Police: Isle of Man
- Fire: Isle of Man
- Ambulance: Isle of Man
- House of Keys: Middle

Glen Vine (Manx: Glion Vian) is a village on the Isle of Man in the parish of Marown. It is on the Isle of Man TT course four miles by road from Douglas.

The Church of England parish church for Marown is St Runius church in Glen Vine. In 1844, Phillip Killey, who was later to be a Captain of the Parish in Marown, donated land adjoining his estate on the main road between Glen Vine and Crosby for the building of a new church and the foundation stone was laid in 1849. The church, which was designed by the architect Ewan Christian, was consecrated in 1859. A new vestry was added in 1899 and a new roof in 1958, with the south transept eventually converted into a meeting room.

The parish primary school, Marown Primary School, was built in the 1980s, and is located in Glen Vine. The school was expanded in 2001.
