= Blab =

Blab means to reveal secrets. It may also refer to:

- Uwe Blab (born 1962), German former player in the National Basketball Association
- W. Epaminondas Adrastus Blab, a pen name of Mark Twain
- BLAB!, an anthology that was published from 1988 to 2007
- BLAB, a recording project by singer-songwriter Frances Murray
- Blab TV, a local television channel in Pensacola, Florida, United States

== See also ==
- B Lab, an American non-profit organization
- Vocal school or blab school, a type of outdated children's primary school in rural North America
