= Blaber River =

River on the Isle of Man

Coordinates: 54.2235°N 4.5811°W

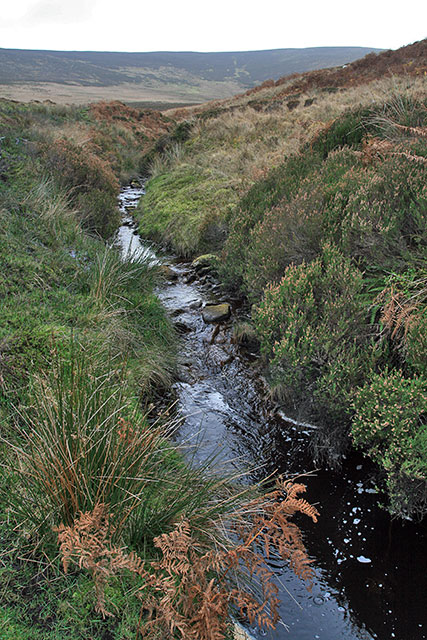
Looking up Blaber River

The Blaber River is a minor river in the Isle of Man.

The Blaber River rises on the eastern flank of Beary Mountain and runs north by north west before joining the River Neb at the head of Glen Helen.
