= River Neb =

River on the Isle of Man

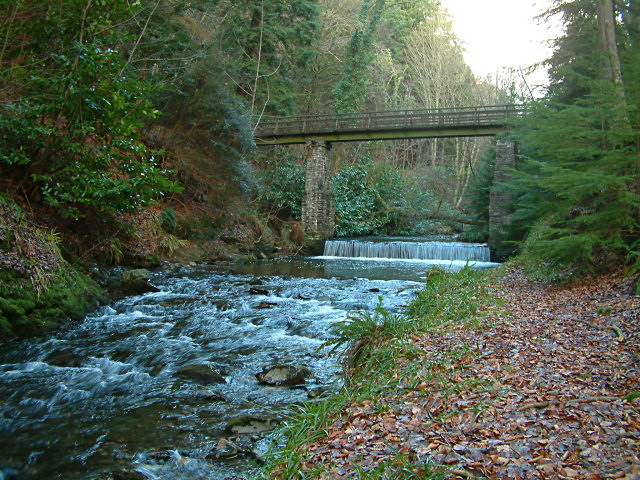
- River Neb at Glen Helen
- Native name: Awin Neb (Manx)

Location
- Country: Isle of Man
- Cities: Peel, St John's

Physical characteristics
- Source: Blaber River
  - coordinates: 54.223°N 4.581°W
  - elevation: 320 m (1,050 ft)
- Source confluence
  - location: Glen Helen
  - coordinates: 54.229°N 4.596°W
  - elevation: 140 m (460 ft)
- Mouth: Peel Harbour
  - coordinates: 54.221°N 4.698°W

Basin features
- Tributaries
  - left: Foxdale River

The River Neb (Manx: Awin Neb) is one of the principal rivers on the Isle of Man. It rises in the Michael hills, flows SW through Glen Helen (where it is joined by the Blaber River) to St John's, where it is joined by its principal tributary, the Foxdale River, and then flows NW to the Irish Sea at the town of Peel on the western coast. The river gets a fine run of seatrout in the autumn.

The estuary of the river was the first known site of human settlement of the island, dating back 9,000 years.
