= River Glass (Isle of Man) =

River on the Isle of Man

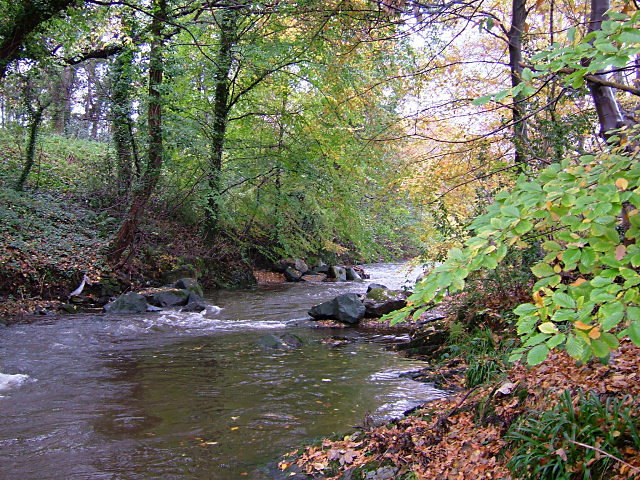
- River Glass at Tromode

Location
- Country: Isle of Man
- City: Douglas

Physical characteristics
- Source: Injebreck Hill
  - coordinates: 54.239°N 4.515°W
  - elevation: 270 m (890 ft)
- Mouth: Confluence with River Dhoo
  - coordinates: 54.151°N 4.502°W
- Length: 11.5 km (7.1 mi)

Basin features
- Tributaries
  - left: Injebreck River, Colder River
  - right: Baldwin River, Sulby River

The River Glass is a river on the Isle of Man. The river begins in the area of Injebreck about 10 km north of Douglas, the Island's capital. Flowing down through the West Baldwin Valley, which was dammed in the 1900s to form West Baldwin Reservoir, the river joins the River Dhoo to form the River Douglas on the outskirts of Douglas before flowing out to sea. The river has a length of approximately 8.5 km.

The name Glass originates from the word for green in Manx.

The western edge of the parish of Onchan is formed by the path of the Glass.

The river has had reported catches of brown trout, rainbow trout, european seabass, and salmon.
