= List of roads in the Isle of Man =

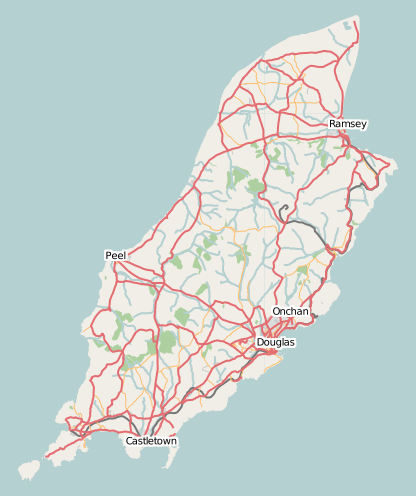
Overview map of roads in the Isle of Man.

== "A" roads ==
Road	From	To	Notes	Coordinates	Route Map
A1	Douglas	Peel	Including the A1 Peel Road joining the A2 and A5 at the Quarterbridge and the A3 at Ballacraine. Connects A8 and Douglas on the east of the Island with Peel on the west. In Douglas the road is known as Peel road and in Peel as Douglas road. The A1 passes through Union Mills, Crosby and St John's.	54.19232°N 4.58637°W	Route of the A1 road
A2	Douglas	Ramsey	Connects Douglas with Ramsey in the north. The road follows the east coast of the Island and passes through Laxey at the midpoint.	54.24542°N 4.3729°W	Route of the A2 road
A3	Castletown	Ramsey	Connects Castletown in the south with Ramsey in the north. The A3 passes through Foxdale, St John's, Kirk Michael and Sulby. Between Ballacraine and Ramsey, the road forms part of the Snaefell Mountain Course over which the Isle of Man TT races are run each year.	54.24421°N 4.60147°W	Route of the A3 road
A4	Peel	Kirk Michael	Connects Peel with Kirk Michael on the west coast.	54.25429°N 4.63039°W	
A5	Douglas	Port Erin	Also called New Castletown Road; connects Douglas with Port Erin in the south via Richmond Hill. The A5 passes through Santon, Ballasalla and Castletown before skirting Gansey Bay and passing the northern side of Port St Mary. Between Santon and Ballasalla, the road passes over the Fairy Bridge.	54.12015°N 4.58353°W	Route of the A5 road
A6	Douglas	Cronk-ny-Mona, Onchan	The Old Castletown Road, Douglas from South Quay to the A25 Old Castletown Road at Kewaigue. Continuing west to the A5/A6 Cooil Road (Fort North) roundabout and the (A6) Cooil Road, Braddan. Travelling eastwards, the A6 Vicarage Road/Saddle Road, Douglas joins the A1 Peel Road at Braddan Bridge. The A6 Braddan Bridge Road/Ballafletcher Road joins the A6 Johnny Watterson's Lane at Cronkbourne Village, continuing to the C10 Scollag Road junction with the A18 Snaefell Mountain Road at Cronk-ny-Mona, Onchan.	54.12372°N 4.5486°W	
A7	Ballasalla	Port Erin	Connects Ballasalla with Port Erin in the south of the Island. The A7 crosses the A3 Castletown to Ramsey road and passes through Ballabeg and Colby.		
A8	Douglas Sea Terminal	Douglas Harbour Lifting Bridge	Connects the northern entrance to Douglas' Seaport with North Quay and the Douglas Harbour Lifting Bridge		
A9	Ramsey	Andreas	Via Regaby		
A10	Ballaugh	Ramsey	Branches off A9 on outskirts of Ramsey; runs north to Bride, then west to Jurby via The Lhen, then south to meet the A3 at Ballaugh.		
A11	Douglas	Balladromma Beg, Lonan	A11 King Edward VIII Road from Summerhill, Queen's Promenade to the Balladromma Beg Halt (Liverpool Arms) road junction on the A2 Douglas to Ramsey Coast Road.		
A12	Castletown	Derbyhaven	Starts at Janet's Corner, Castletown (junction with A5), runs east past Hango Hill to Derbyhaven where it turns north towards the airport runway. Formerly it continued on the other side of the airport runway to Ballasalla, but that section is now designated as the B53.		
A13	Ramsey	The Cronk, Ballaugh	A13 Jurby Road from the A9 Bowring Road junction, Ramsey to the A10 Jurby Coast Road and B9 Ballacrye Road junction at The Cronk, Ballaugh.		
A14	Jurby	Bungalow	From Jurby the road runs south, crossing the A13 at Sandygate and the A3 at Sulby. It continues up Sulby Glen, skirting Snaefell, and meets the A18 at the Bungalow.		
A15	Port Lewaigue (Belle Vue)	The Hibernian	Branches off A2 at Port Lewaigue and forms a loop through Maughold before rejoining the A2 at The Hibernian.		
A16	Bride	Point of Ayre	Cul-de-sac from Bride to the Point of Ayre		
A17	Bride	Sulby Bridge	Via Andreas and St Judes		
A18	Douglas	Ramsey	Snaefell Mountain Road. The entire road forms part of the Isle of Man TT Course and crosses the hilliest parts of the Island, reaching 422 m (1,385 ft). The road is closed for TT and Manx Grand Prix races and sometimes closed due to bad weather at other times. The majority of the road outside of developed areas has no speed limit. See A18 for more about this road.		Route of the A18 road
A19	Lhen Bridge	Andreas	Bayr Kione Droghad		
A20	Peel	Ballig	Also known as Poortown Road, after the small settlement of Poortown through which it passes. Connects Peel on the west coast of the Island with the A3 Castletown to Ramsey road at a point just north of St John's.	54.21607°N 4.66344°W	
A22	Union Mills	St Ninian's Crossroads	Loop via Strang, Nobles Hospital and Ballanard		
A23	Strang	Crosby	Loop via Mount Rule		
A24	Douglas	Foxdale	Connects the A3 Castletown to Ramsey road in Foxdale with the A5 Port Erin to Douglas road. Between Foxdale and Douglas, the road passes the Eairy Dam and Braaid.	54.15746°N 4.58524°W	
A25	Douglas	Blackboards	Also known as Old Castletown Road. Connects Douglas with Ballasalla, and historically with Castletown. The road is now bypassed by the A5 Douglas to Port Erin route which allows for faster traffic movement.	54.12875°N 4.54113°W	
A26	Ballasalla	Glen Vine	Connects Ballasalla with Glen Vine where it meets the A1 Douglas to Peel road. Between Ballasalla and Glen Vine, the road passes through St Mark's and Braaid.	54.14544°N 4.59142°W	
A27	Colby	Peel	Also known as Colby Glen Road. Connects Colby with Peel. Between its junction with the A7 road in Colby and its terminus in the centre of Peel, the road passes through Colby Glen, the Round Table, Dalby, Glenmaye and Patrick.	54.15595°N 4.70875°W	
A28	Ballakaighan, Castletown	Ballabeg, Arbory	Forms the W side of the Southern 100 Course		
A29	Port St Mary	Ballagawne	Connects the village of Ballagawne with Port St Mary via Four Roads		
A30	St John's	Patrick	Bayr Keill Pherick	54.20317°N 4.66481°W	
A31	Port St Mary	Calf Sound	The eastern part is known as Raad yn Cheyllys. Connects Port St Mary with the Calf Sound, passing the village of Cregneash.	54.07349°N 4.7594°W	
A32	Port Erin	Ballachurry, Port Erin	Loop via Bradda		
A33	Douglas Railway Station	Intersection with A6 and A41	Connects A1 with A6 and A41 in Douglas		
A34	Ballanank, Malew	Mount Rule, Malew	Also known as Phildraw Road; connects Ballasalla with the A3 Castletown to Ramsey road.	54.10959°N 4.63005°W	
A35	Onchan	Port Jack, Onchan	A35 Royal Avenue and Royal Avenue West, Onchan with the 'Port Jack'/Imperial Terrace/Royal Terrace junction with the A11 King Edward VIII road.		
A36	Port Erin	South Barrule	Connects the A7 Ballasalla to Port Erin road near Port Erin to the A3 Castletown to Ramsey road south of Foxdale. The road is known as the Sloc Road as it bends through the Sloc, a pass on the southern side of Cronk ny Arrey Laa. It is also known as the Shoulder road as it passes over the northern shoulder of South Barrule.	54.13096°N 4.71545°W	
A37	B52 in Keristal	B23 in Port Soderick	Also known as Marine Drive. Used to extend along the shore into Douglas but had to be re-routed because of bad road conditions. The northern section of Marine Drive is now B80.		
A38	Queen's Promenade, Douglas	Onchan (centre)	Summerhill, Queen's Promenade and Summerhill Road, Douglas with the junction of the A2 Governor's Road, Onchan.(less than 1,200 yards long).		
A40	The Hope, Patrick.	St John's	A40 The Hope Road from the junction of the A3 Curragh Road and C33 Archallagan Road at (Lower Foxdale) with the A40 Station Road junction with the A1 Douglas to Peel road at Tynwald Hill in St John's. About 1,000 yards long.	54.19895°N 4.64018°W	
A41	A6 Old Castletown Road	Battery Pier, Douglas Harbour	Connects A6 and A33 Bridge Road with South Quay, Douglas Head Road and the Battery Pier.		

== "B" roads ==
Note: Many of these roads in rural areas do not lead to or from anywhere remotely notable, while many of the roads within towns and villages are very short indeed. This makes it problematic to include "to" or "from" destinations.

No.	Details	Parish etc.
B1	Minorca Hill, Laxey	Laxey
B2	Leodest Road	Andreas
B3	Andreas-Jurby	Andreas/Jurby
B4	Ballaheaney road, Jurby East	Jurby
B5	Ballavarran road, Jurby West	Jurby
B6	Smeale Road, Andreas	Andreas
B7	Kerrowgarrow to Regaby	Andreas
B8	Sulby Claddagh road	Lezayre
B9	Ballacrye road, The Cronk	Ballaugh
B10	Beinn-y-Phott Road	Lezayre/Braddan/Michael
B11	Ballaragh road	Lonan
B12	Creg-ny-Baa Back Road (Ballacannell-Creg-ny-Baa)	Lonan/Onchan
B13	East Bretney Road, Jurby East	Jurby
B14	Bernahara road, Andreas	Andreas/Lezayre
B15	Richmond Road	Ramsey
B16	Glen Auldyn	Lezayre
B17	Lezayre Church road, Churchtown	Lezayre
B18	Port St Mary	Port St Mary
B19	Dreemskerry road, Lewaigue-Ballajora	Maughold
B20	Begoade road	Lonan/Onchan
B21	East Baldwin road	Braddan
B22	West Baldwin Road	Braddan
B23	Port Soderick Road	Braddan
B24	Oatland road	Malew
B25	Glentraugh	Santon
B26	Ballavale road	Santon
B27	Saddle Road	Douglas
B28	Park Road	Port St Mary
B29	Ballachurry road	Malew
B30	Ballamodha to St Marks road (The Bayrauyr)	Malew
B31	Harbour Road	Onchan
B32	Lhergy Cripperty road	Braddan
B33	Croit-e-Caley/Kentraugh Mill road	Rushen
B34	Blackberry Lane	Onchan
B35	Garth road	Malew/Marown
B36	Tosaby road	Malew/Marown
B37	Clannagh road	Santon
B38	Orrisdale road	Malew
NB not Orrisdale in Michael sheading
B39	Ronague Road/Solomons Corner to Corlea road	Arbory/Malew
B40	Ballamaddrell / Grenaby road	Malew/Arbory
B41	Grenaby to Kerrowkeill Road	Malew
B42	Ronague Road	Arbory
B43	Ballagawne road	Arbory
B44	Ballakilpheric road	Rushen
B45	Mount Gawne road	Rushen
B46	Barracks road	Rushen
B47	Fleshwick	Rushen
B48	Royal Avenue (part)	Onchan
B49	Laxey Promenade	Laxey
B50	Silverdale road	Malew
B52	Keristal road	Braddan
B53	Balthane, Ballasalla (see A12)	Malew
B54	Sunningdale Drive	Onchan
B55	Falkland Drive	Onchan
B61	Alexander Drive	Douglas
B61 to B82 (except B72 and B80) are various town streets in Douglas
B63	Derby Road	Douglas
B74	Westmoreland Road	Douglas
B80	Marine Drive	Douglas/Braddan

== See also ==
- Transport in the Isle of Man
- List of named corners of the Snaefell Mountain Course
- Speed limits in the Isle of Man
