= Braaid =

Coordinates: 54.1544°N 4.5751°W

Braaid: Manx: Braaid
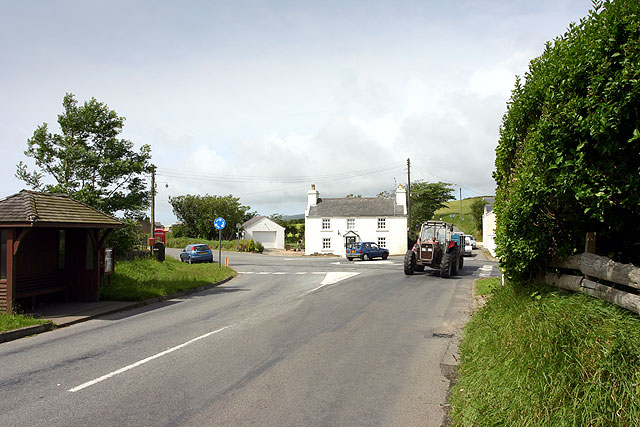
- Crossroads in Braaid

- Location within the Isle of Man
- Population: (2006 Census)
- OS grid reference: SC319762
- Parish: Marown
- Sheading: Middle
- Crown dependency: Isle of Man
- Post town: ISLE OF MAN
- Postcode district: IM4
- Dialling code: 01624
- Police: Isle of Man
- Fire: Isle of Man
- Ambulance: Isle of Man
- House of Keys: Middle

Braaid (Manx: Braaid) is a hamlet in the parish of Marown on the Isle of Man, about 6 km west of the capital Douglas. It is best known for the nearby ancient settlement of The Braaid. In Manx, braaid means 'gullet, gorge; breast of a hill', the latter meaning possibly in reference to the aforementioned ancient settlement.

== General description ==
The hamlet is centred on the crossroads of the A24 Foxdale to Douglas road and the A26 Ballasalla to Glen Vine road. The hamlet consists of a main concentration of houses around this crossroads and some other farms and dwellings which surround it.

== The Braaid Hall ==
The Braaid Hall has provided a centre for the community since 1937, when it was founded as the Braaid Young Mens Club. It is now mainly used to hold Eisteddfods, sports days, jumble sales and other events for the local community.

== The Braaid Eisteddfod ==
The Braaid Eisteddfod is an annual musical and literary festival that started in the 1950s.
