= West Baldwin Reservoir =

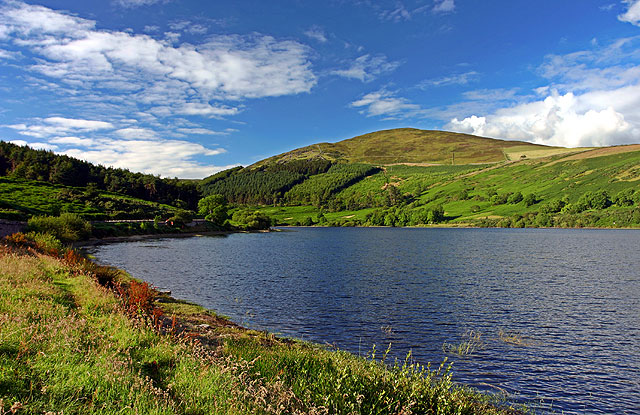

- Location within Isle of Man Location within the United Kingdom
- Interactive map of West Baldwin Reservoir
- Coordinates: 54°13′10″N 4°31′00″W
- Type: Reservoir
- Primary inflows: River Glass
- Primary outflows: River Glass
- Catchment area: 5.55 square kilometres (1,370 acres)
- Basin countries: Isle of Man
- Surface area: 16.8 hectares (42 acres)
- Max. depth: 21.6 m (71 ft)
- Water volume: 1,364,000 m^{3} (1,106 acre⋅ft)

West Baldwin Reservoir (also known as Injebreck Reservoir, locally) is a reservoir on the Isle of Man, about 6 miles (9.7 km) north of Douglas which it supplies. It was constructed by building a dam across the valley of the River Glass. It is operated by the Isle of Man Water Authority.

== History ==
Construction of the dam started in 1900 by the Douglas Corporation Water Works Department. A railway was first built, including nine wooden bridges over the River Glen, to transport the required material to site. The construction was finished in 1904.

== Dam ==
The reservoir's dam was completed in 1904. It is an earth fill embankment dam, 22.5 metres (74 ft) high, which required some 500,000 long tons (510,000 t) of earth to build. There is a vertical puddle clay core supported by zoned earth fill shoulders. The higher part of the upstream shoulder is faced in dry rubble pitching about 60 centimetres (2 ft) thick. The crest and downstream shoulder are grassed.

== Use ==
The reservoir supplies Douglas, Onchan and the south of the island. Water can also be pumped from the Sulby Reservoir.
