= Beinn-y-Phott =

Manx mountain

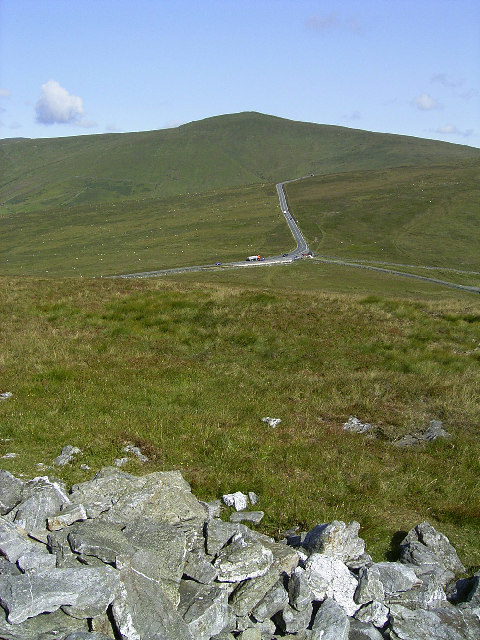
- seen from the top of Cairn Gerjoil looking across Windy Corner

Highest point
- Elevation: 1,791 ft (546 m)
- Prominence: 443 ft (135 m)
- Coordinates: 54°14′39.3″N 4°29′9.9″W

Naming
- English translation: point of the pot

Geography
- Location within Isle of Man
- Location: Isle of Man
- OS grid: SC381860

Beinn-y-Phott, (Manx: turf summit) (colloquial pronunciation 'penny pot' ['pɛni fot] / [ðə 'pɛni pɔt]) is a peak of 546 metres (1,791 feet) on the Isle of Man, about 2 km SW of Snaefell.

It is at the southern end of the parish of Kirk Lezayre. It is skirted by the Mountain Course used for the TT races and is near Brandywell. It is covered by moorland and a detailed dating of its vegetation through the Holocene period has been made — mostly heathers, peat mosses and sedges.
