= Glen Roy (Isle of Man) =

River on the Isle of Man

Coordinates: 54.22306°N 4.43000°W

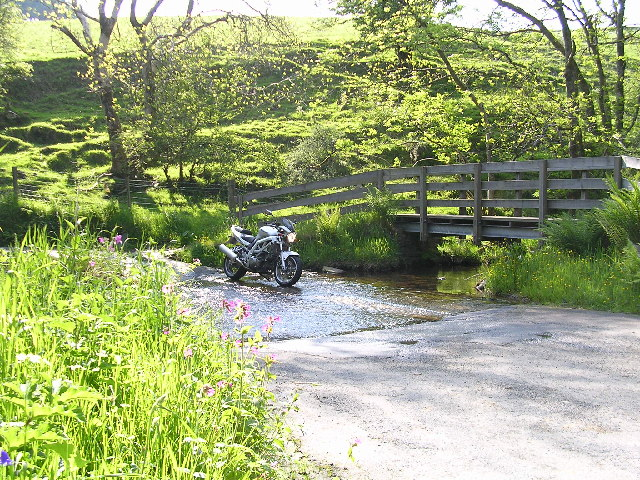

Location
- Country: Isle of Man

Glen Roy is a river on the Isle of Man where trout may be fished.
