= Marown =

Parish on the Isle of Man

Coordinates: 54°11′N 4°34′W

Marown: Manx: Skeerey Varooney
- Parish of Marown, Isle of Man
- Population: 2,246
- OS grid reference: SC3265278833
- Sheading: Middle
- Crown dependency: Isle of Man
- Post town: ISLE OF MAN
- Postcode district: IM4
- House of Keys: Middle

Marown (/məˈraʊn/ mə-ROWN, rhymes with "gown"; Manx: Marooney) is one of the seventeen historic parishes of the Isle of Man. It is the only landlocked parish on the Island.

It is located in the centre of the island, in the sheading of Middle, though historically, from 1796 until 1986, it was in the sheading of Glenfaba.

Settlements in the parish include Braaid, Crosby and Glen Vine.

== Local government ==
For the purposes of local government, the whole of the historic parish forms a single parish district with Commissioners.

Although Marown lies east of the watershed and is currently in the sheading of Middle, it is also grouped for various local government purposes with the west of the island: it falls under the aegis of the Peel and Western District Housing Committee, Western Traffic Management Group, Western Neighbourhood Policing etc.

The Captain of the Parish (since 2001) is Charles Fargher MBE.

== Politics ==
Marown parish is part of the Middle constituency, which elects two Members to the House of Keys. Before 1986 it was in the Glenfaba constituency.

== Geography ==
Marown has an area of about 9 square miles (23 km^{2}) and is the only landlocked parish on the island. The River Dhoo flows through the parish.

== Churches, education, historic buildings ==
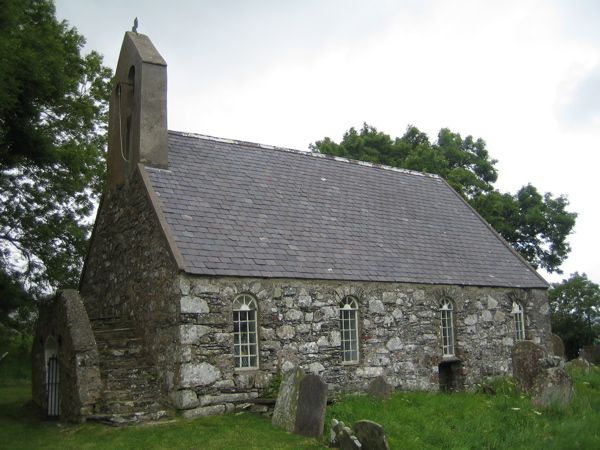
Marown Old Church - St Runius

The Church of England parish church is St Runius church in Glen Vine. The old St Runius Church is in Crosby. and St Luke's church. Crosby has a Methodist chapel.

The parish primary school, Marown Primary School, was built in the 1980s, and is located in Glen Vine. The school was expanded in 2001.

Marown Language Centre (Manx: Yn Ynnyd Çhengey), a foreign language teaching facility and training centre for teachers on the island, is located in Crosby, close to the Old St Runius Church (dedicated to St Runius or Rónán). The name of the parish is derived from this saint (cf Malew).

Historic homes in the parish include Ellerslie Manor, Ballacotch Manor and Ballavagher House.

== Roads and footpaths ==
The Millennium Way long distance footpath runs through the parish, as does the Heritage Trail, which follows the old Peel to Douglas railway line. The Snaefell Mountain Course also runs through the parish.

== Demographics ==
The Isle of Man census of 2016 returned a parish population of 2,246, a decrease of 2.9% from the figure of 2,311 in 2011. The equivalent figure in the 2021 census was 2,220.

Marown (census)
Year	1996	2001	2006	2011	2016	2021
Pop.	1,564	1,879	2,086	2,311	2,246	2,220
±%	—	+20.1%	+11.0%	+10.8%	−2.8%	−1.2%

== Sport ==
Marown A.F.C. is a football club who compete in the Isle of Man Football League. They play their home games at the Memorial Playing Fields in Crosby. The village also has the Crosby Cricket Club who play on the same site. They were founded in 1946 and are members of the Isle of Man Cricket Association. The parish also has Marown Badminton Club based in Glen Vine, who are members of the Isle of Man Badminton Association, Marown Hockey Club and Marown Bowling Club.
