= Crosby, Isle of Man =

Coordinates: 54.1833°N 4.5667°W

Crosby: Manx: Balley ny Croshey
- Location within the Isle of Man
- Population: 900
- OS grid reference: SC325794
  - Douglas: 6 km
- Parish: Marown
- Sheading: Middle
- Crown dependency: Isle of Man
- Post town: ISLE OF MAN
- Postcode district: IM4
- Dialling code: 01624
- Police: Isle of Man
- Fire: Isle of Man
- Ambulance: Isle of Man
- House of Keys: Middle

Crosby (Gaelic: Baile na Croise - cross-town) (Old Norse: Kross-bør – Cross farm or cross roads, market place) (locally /ˈkrɑːizbiː/) is a small village located 3 3/4 miles (6.0 kilometres) west of Douglas in the parish of Marown in the Isle of Man.

== Description ==
The village of Crosby is situated in the centre of the parish of Marown on the primary A1 Douglas to Peel road at the cross-road junction with the A23 Mount Rule Road and the B35 Garth Road.

It has a population of about 900. The River Dhoo flows to the south of Crosby village through the main Douglas to Peel Central valley.

== Village ==
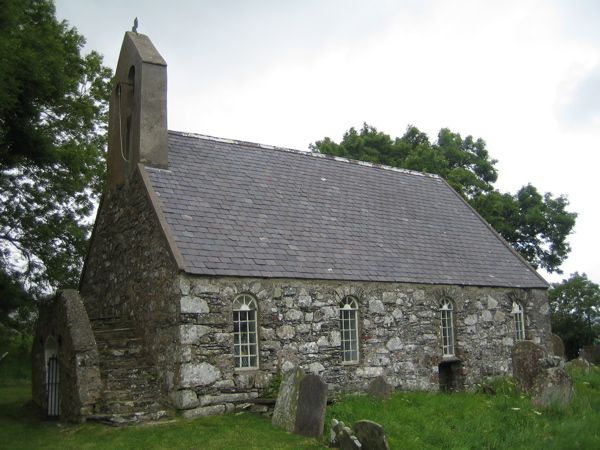
Marown Old Church – St Runius

The old St Runius church, which was the original Marown parish church until the new church was built in 1859, is located in Crosby. Part of the old church dates back to the 12th century. It was expanded in 1754. When the new church was built, the original church was used as a mortuary chapel and part of the east side was demolished. The building was eventually restored and re-opened on 9 August 1959, with services now held regularly each summer and on major festivals. The village also has a Methodist chapel. Crosby Wesleyan Methodist Chapel was opened on 6 October 1833.

Marown Language Centre (Manx: Yn Ynnyd Çhengey), a foreign language teaching facility and training centre for teachers on the island, is located in Crosby, close to the old St Runius Church.

The village's historic railway station opened on 1 July 1873 and last operated on 7 September 1968 when the line closed. It was on the Douglas to Peel line of the Isle of Man Railway which now forms the Heritage Trail, following the course of the old line. The station was demolished but the crossing keeper's cottage on the east side is now a shelter for walkers on the trail.

Local amenities in Crosby include a children's play park, football and cricket pitch, chapel and pub, which is also a popular spectator spot for watching the Isle of Man TT.

== Sport ==
Marown F.C. is a football club which competes in the Isle of Man Football League playing home games at the Memorial Playing Fields in Crosby. The village also has the Crosby Cricket Club which shares the same site. Founded in 1946, the club is part of the Isle of Man Cricket Association.

== Motor-Sport heritage ==
The Crosby village section of the A1 Douglas to Peel road was part of the short Highland Course (40 3/8 mi or 65.0 km) from 1906 and the also the 37 1/2-mile (60.4-kilometre) Four Inch Course used for car racing including the RAC Tourist Trophy car races held between 1906 and 1922.

In 1911, the Four Inch Course was first used by the Auto-Cycling Union for the Isle of Man TT motorcycle races. This included the Crosby cross-roads and Crosby village sections and the course later became known as the (37 3/4 mi or 60.8 km) Isle of Man TT Mountain Course which has been used since 1911 for the Isle of Man TT Races and from 1923 for the Manx Grand Prix races.

== Gallery ==
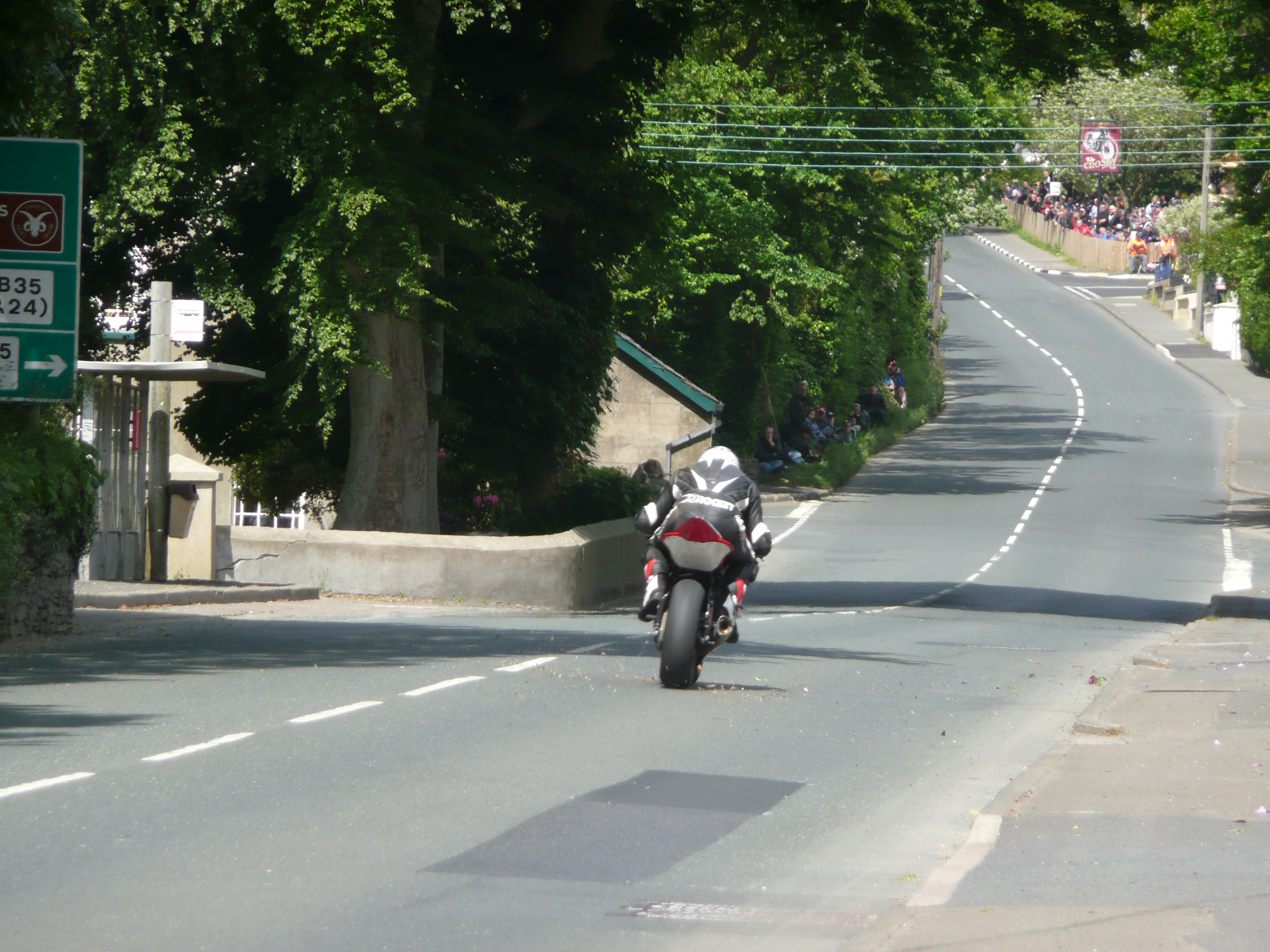
Unknown rider approaching Crosby Crossroads during the Junior Supersport B TT race in 2008
