= Registered Buildings and Conservation Areas of the Isle of Man =

This is a list of Registered Buildings and Conservation Areas of the Isle of Man. It includes buildings and structures in the Isle of Man designated by Isle of Man's Department of Environment, Food and Agriculture (DEFA) "as having special architectural or historical interest". Over 250 buildings and structures are listed, and 275 more have been identified as having potential for listing. It also lists the 21 Conservation Areas, historic districts" which protect "period"-type architecture, quality of building materials, relationships of enclosures and open spaces, and other aspects of the look and feel of historic buildings and areas.

Ongoing enforcement and registration of buildings is administered by a Planning and Building Control Directorate, within DEFA, and is guided by a planning policy document on conservation of the historic environment.

DEFA notes that eight of the registered buildings have thatched roofs. Thatching in the Isle of Man include a group of thatched houses at Cregneash Folk Museum, which are Manx National Heritage property, whose buildings and land were initially excluded from the register, however this is no longer the case with the registration of the Calf of Man lighthouses.

DEFA notes that ten are designed by noted architect Baillie Scott. A number are designed by, or associated with, architect Thomas Brine. (Note: Thomas Brine is associated with St Paul's, Ramsey, Old House of Keys, the Herring Tower, and Westwood, The Crofts.)

The Alliance for Building Conservation, a consortium of heritage groups on the Isle of Man, was organised in 2014–15 and has advocated for more preservation of buildings. It had concerns in 2015 about a backlog for registration of heritage buildings.

The 21 Conservation Areas include nine swaths of properties in the capital town of Douglas, and swaths in towns of Peel, Castletown, and Ramsey, and sections in nine village centers or other areas. Most of these include numerous individual Registered Buildings plus all surrounding properties.

== Registered Buildings ==
The Registered Buildings are as follows:

KEY

Has thatched roof
Baillie Scott-designed

	Official name	Image	Location	Parish /local authority area	Date of registration	Note
2	Leodest Methodist Chapel, Leodest Road		Leodest Road; 54.375426°N 4.452840°W	Andreas	23 May 1983	A Primitive Methodist chapel built in 1835
5	Yn Thie Thooit		Lhen Road, The Lhen; 54.381793°N 4.497203°W	Andreas	23 May 1983	House with thatched roof. Bequested to Manx National Heritage in 1989. Owned by Manx Museum and National Trust, and available for rental.
189	Close Lake House		Jurby Road; 54.333208°N 4.439249°W	Andreas	15 May 2001	Mid-Victorian double-fronted house, perhaps built around 1703 for Rev. Wm. Bell Christian and his new wife, Charlotte Elizabeth Brine.
255	The Old Rectory, Andreas Village		Andreas Village; 54.365831°N 4.442509°W	Andreas	2 May 2009	
262	Windmill at Ballawhane Farm		Ballawhane Farm, Leodest Road	Andreas	16 January 2019	
336	Ballavarry Farmhouse, Andreas		Bernahara Road	Andreas	29 September 2021	
150	Balladoole Farm Buildings		54.083104°N 4.678352°W	Arbory	8 February 1994	
207	The Former Wesleyan Chapel, Earystane Village		Earystane Village; 54.115335°N 4.705154°W	Arbory	18 October 2002	Church from 1864 In ruins, unroofed, per 2002 registration. Google and Bing satellite views accessed in 2020 however show a roofed structure now at that location.
235	Parville, also known as Parville Place, Ballagawne Road, Ballabeg, IM9 4LF		Ballagawne Road, Ballabeg; 54.101247°N 4.682002°W	Arbory	1 September 2006	Prominent, large house set within extensive gardens. Hard to date; original portion believed to be from lifetime of Deemster John Parr, 1651–1713.
11	Ballaugh Old Church, The Cronk		Cronk Rd (A10), The Cronk; 54.329941°N 4.553489°W	Ballaugh	21 July 1983	History dating to before 1231. "New" parish church built 1832, now known as Ballaugh Old Church.
1	Bishopscourt, together with buildings contiguous therewith		54.299707°N 4.570821°W	Ballaugh	23 May 1983	
311	Ballaugh Parish War Memorial		Glen Road	Ballaugh	7 July 2021	
12	Old Kirk Braddan Church, Saddle Road		54.160993°N 4.507041°W	Braddan	21 July 1983	(Note: For RB12 "Old Kirk Braddan Church, Saddle Road", Isle of Man government provides registration document for Registered Building No. 11 instead.)
81	Crogga Mill			Braddan	13 May 1985	Presumably on east bank of Crogga River which forms border between Braddan and Santon parishes.
92	Cronkbourne Village		Ballafletcher Road54.168623°N 4.496635°W	Braddan	7 July 1987	Two dozen cottages in two rows.
130	St Luke's Church		Brandywell Rd.54.209751°N 4.516128°W	Braddan	16 April 1990	
153	Cronkbourne House and Cronkbourne Place		54.167172°N 4.495831°W	Braddan	6 February 1995	
158	Cemetery Office, Braddan Church		54.164097°N 4.505620°W	Braddan	26 January 1996	Baillie Scott-designed.
165	Oak House, Ballamona		54.17339°N 4.50815°W	Braddan	4 July 1996	Oak House within Ballamona Hospital, Strang. (Within the current site of Noble's Hospital)
180	Port Soderick railway station		54.126561°N 4.538388°W	Braddan	18 September 2000	1897 built.
229	Braddan Lodge, Braddan Road		54.164604°N 4.505856°W	Braddan	22 July 2005	
232	Former Toll House, (Tollgate House), Old Castletown Road junction, Marine Drive (Note: Wording corrected relative to DEFA website's wording "Former Toil House, (Tollgate House), Old C'town Road junction, Marine Drive")		54.134211°N 4.520549°W	Braddan	6 June 2006	
233	The Ornamental Gateway, Marine Drive		54.140669°N 4.470895°W	Braddan	6 June 2006	Romantic, castellated gateway.
3	Cranstal Cottage, Cranstal		Cranstal Rd., Cranstal; 54.391136°N 4.375384°W	Bride	23 May 1983	Has thatched roof.
4	Bridge Cottage, Cranstal		Cranstal Rd., Cranstal; 54.390473°N 4.376430°W	Bride	23 May 1983	Has thatched roof, 100 yards from Cranstal Cottage.
135	Thurot Cottage, Hill Road		Thurot Cottage Road; 54.385236°N 4.410019°W	Bride	17 October 1990	
146	Thurot Cottage Outbuildings and Gate, Hill Road		54.38449°N 4.41201°W54.38546°N 4.41024°W54.38551°N 4.40996°W54.38551°N 4.40940°W	Bride	21 October 1992	
147	Point of Ayre Lighthouse		Point of Ayre; 54°24′56.7″N 4°22′05.2″W	Bride	5 November 1993	
297	Fog Horn, Point of Ayre		Cranstal	Bride	7 July 2021	
298	Lighthouse (Winkie), Point of Ayre		Cranstal	Bride	7 July 2021	
332	K6 Telephone Kiosk, Bride Village		Bride Village	Bride	1 September 2021	one of several telephone boxes which are registered buildings
16	Bridge House (main building), Bridge Street		Bridge Street; 54.074042°N 4.651099°W	Castletown	26 September 1983	Four-storey building with pitched slate roof masked by parapet. Site of the former Isle of Man Bank (Quayle's Bank). Attached Nautical Museum building is excluded.
17	Town Hall (Manannan House) Market Square (the main building)		54.073413°N 4.653934°W	Castletown	26 September 1983	
24	Castle Rushen		54.073769°N 4.6529°W	Castletown	3 February 1984	
25	The Castle Arms Hotel (The Glue Pot)		Castle Street; 54.074027°N 4.652380°W	Castletown	3 February 1984	
26	The Social Security Offices		54.073998°N 4.652204°W	Castletown	3 February 1984	
27	The Police Station		54.073802°N 4.652120°W	Castletown	3 February 1984	One-storey stone building with a circular turret, designed by architect Baillie Scott. The status of this site is currently under review in 2018; the old building has been deemed "surplus" and is no longer used by the police, and had been put up for sale. It was possible that Manx Museum National Trust could take ownership.
28	The Post Office		54.073683°N 4.652127°W	Castletown	3 February 1984	
29	The Commissioners' Office (Old House of Keys) Parliament Square		54.073389°N 4.652083°W	Castletown	3 February 1984	
30	Barclays Bank, Market Square		Market Square; 54.073555°N 4.653614°W	Castletown	3 February 1984	
31	"The Parade Stores" (G & F Collister), 1 Malew Street IM9 1AB		1 Malew St. 54.073628°N 4.653904°W	Castletown	3 February 1984	Later Lloyds Pharmacy.
32	The Manx Co-operative Store, The Parade		54.073051°N 4.653529°W	Castletown	3 February 1984	See The Manx Co-operative Store, Manx Co-operative Store.
33	The Smelt Memorial		54.073200°N 4.653291°W	Castletown	3 February 1984	Built 1836–37.
34	No. 5 The Parade		The Parade; 54.072803°N 4.653270°W	Castletown	3 February 1984	
35	Balcony House, The Parade		54°04′22.29″N 4°39′11.5″W	Castletown	3 February 1984	
36	"The Odd Bottle"/Castle Wine Stores, 6A The Parade		54.072923°N 4.653379°W	Castletown	3 February 1984	
37	No. 7 (formerly No. 4), The Parade		The Parade; 54.072995°N 4.653448°W	Castletown	3 February 1984	
38	The George Hotel, The Parade		The Parade; 54.073178°N 4.653635°W	Castletown	3 February 1984	
39	The Isle of Man Bank, The Parade		The Parade; 54.073279°N 4.653726°W	Castletown	3 February 1984	Branch of the Isle of Man Bank
40	The Trustee Savings Bank, The Parade		The Parade; 54.073342°N 4.653823°W	Castletown	3 February 1984	Former branch of the Trustee Savings Bank. Later Lloyds TSB.
41	Ellan Vannin, The Quay		The Quay; 54.073772°N 4.651827°W	Castletown	24 February 1984	
42	Packet House, The Quay		The Quay; 54.073680°N 4.651689°W	Castletown	24 February 1984	
43	1 Quay Lane		1 Quay Lane; 54.073538°N 4.651797°W	Castletown	24 February 1984	
44	2 Quay Lane		2 Quay Lane; 54.073577°N 4.651741°W	Castletown	24 February 1984	
45	Garage, rear of "Clarksons", 1 Parliament Square		54.073463°N 4.651874°W	Castletown	24 February 1984	Modified extensively to add second storey, or possibly demolished and replaced by two-storey stone building. (Note: Contrast evident photo in 1 Parliament Square documentation vs. Google Streetview captured September 2010, accessed 18 April 2018. May now be known as "The Old Coach House".)
46	1 Parliament Square		1 Parliament Square; 54.073551°N 4.652018°W	Castletown	24 February 1984	
47	Harbour House, 7 The Quay		7 The Quay; 54.073575°N 4.651489°W	Castletown	24 February 1984	
48	The Granary, The Quay		The Quay; 54.073515°N 4.651431°W	Castletown	24 February 1984	
49	5 The Quay		5 The Quay; 54.073472°N 4.651357°W	Castletown	24 February 1984	
50	4 The Quay		4 The Quay54.073436°N 4.651282°W	Castletown	24 February 1984	
51	3 The Quay		3 The Quay; 54.073397°N 4.651224°W	Castletown	24 February 1984	
53	The Soup Kitchen/The Old Inn, Parliament Lane		Parliament Lane; 54.073325°N 4.651379°W	Castletown	24 February 1984	
54	3 Parliament Lane		3 Parliament Lane; 54.073418°N 4.651405°W	Castletown	24 February 1984	
55	1 Parliament Lane		1 Parliament Lane; 54.073435°N 4.651597°W	Castletown	24 February 1984	
56	Former H M Coastguard Building (now Rocket House), Parliament Square		1 Quay Lane; 54.073481°N 4.651645°W	Castletown	24 February 1984	
57	4 Quay Lane		4 Quay Lane; 54.073544°N 4.651564°W	Castletown	24 February 1984	
58	2 Parliament Square		2 Parliament Square; 54.073337°N 4.651714°W	Castletown	24 February 1984	
59	3 The Parade		The Parade; 54.072994°N 4.652765°W	Castletown	24 February 1984	
60	The Old Lifeboat House, The Quay		The Quay; 54.073057°N 4.651507°W	Castletown	24 February 1984	
61	3 Parliament Square		Parliament Square; 54.073327°N 4.651886°W	Castletown	24 February 1984	
62	4 Parliament Square		Parliament Square; 54.073342°N 4.652005°W	Castletown	24 February 1984	
63	Westminster House, Parliament Square		54.073293°N 4.652288°W	Castletown	24 February 1984	
64	5 Parliament Square		Parliament Square; 54.073361°N 4.652315°W	Castletown	24 February 1984	
65	Compton House, Parliament Square		Parliament Square; 54.073388°N 4.652411°W	Castletown	24 February 1984	
66	Stanley House, Castle Street		Castle Street; 54.073327°N 4.652630°W	Castletown	24 February 1984	Later "Leonardo's Restaurant".
67	"Hawtons", 5 Castle Street		Castle Street; 54.073273°N 4.652839°W	Castletown	24 February 1984	
68	3 Castle Street		Castle Street; 54.073230°N 4.652929°W	Castletown	24 February 1984	
69	24 Castle Street		24 Castle Street; 54.073203°N 4.653016°W	Castletown	24 February 1984	
70	Red House, 1 The Parade		The Parade; 54.073112°N 4.652920°W	Castletown	24 February 1984	
71	2 The Parade		The Parade; 54.073042°N 4.652828°W	Castletown	24 February 1984	
72	St Mary's Church		54.072815°N 4.652857°W	Castletown	15 March 1984	Former church building, now offices.
73	St Mary's Chapel/Old Grammar School		54°04′22.02″N 4°39′07.87″W	Castletown	15 March 1984	
76	The Witches Mill and attached building (part of Mill Court)		54.075257°N 4.662323°W	Castletown	28 February 1985	
185	King William's College, Castletown		54.078967°N 4.635016°W	Castletown	6 July 2001	
208	The Golden Meadow Mill		54.079266°N 4.651585°W	Castletown	18 October 2002	Also known as Meadow Mill or Paradise Meadow Mill.
257	Castletown Railway Station, Victoria Road		54.078670°N 4.648767°W	Castletown	8 April 2008	Built of local limestone in c.1874. Listing includes two buildings.
259	Elderbank, The Crofts, IM9 1LW		54.074310°N 4.656689°W	Castletown	8 April 2008	
260	Westwood, The Crofts, IM9 1LW		54.074622°N 4.656682°W	Castletown	8 April 2008	Associated with Manx architect Thomas Brine.
261	Crofton, The Crofts, IM9 1LW		54.074751°N 4.656306°W	Castletown	8 April 2008	
264	Royal British Legion Hall, Janet's Corner		Bromet Road	Castletown	3 March 2009	Possibly has been demolished.
269	Lorne House		Bridge Street; 54.075021°N 4.651074°W	Castletown	11 November 2015	Two-storey stone mansion and gardens. Originally built in the 1700s; rebuilt or extended in 1828 to Georgian design of Thomas Brine.
299	Nautical Museum		Bridge Street	Castletown	7 July 2021	1781 dock, acting as a museum since 1950
313	Castletown War Memorial		Market Square	Castletown	7 July 2021	Commemorates those lost in the First and Second World Wars
18	20 Church Street		20 Church St. 54.149009°N 4.481214°W	Douglas	26 September 1988	
19	22 Church Street (including that portion of the shop extending under No. 20 Church Street)		22 Church St. 54.149067°N 4.481264°W	Douglas	26 September 1983	
20	24 Church Street		24 Church St. 54.149105°N 4.481296°W	Douglas	26 September 1983	
21	7 John Street		7 John Street; 54.148977°N 4.481154°W	Douglas	26 September 1983	
74	Douglas Railway Station, together with the Ticket Office, Gateway and boundary walls		54.147847°N 4.485301°W	Douglas	15 March 1984	
77	The Great Union Camera Obscura, Douglas Head		Douglas Head54.143345°N 4.467289°W	Douglas	29 March 1985	
78	Clinch's Brewery Building, North Quay		North Quay; 54.147520°N 4.484386°W	Douglas	29 March 1985	See Clinch's Brewery
82	The Castle Mona Hotel, Central Promenade		54.161754°N 4.473410°W	Douglas	3 October 1985	
86	The Spire of St Andrew's United Reform Church, Finch Road		Finch Road; 54.150672°N 4.481073°W	Douglas	19 February 1986	Indeed, 2010 Google Streetview imagery shows spire while church beside has been replaced. St. Andrew's United Reform Church has relocated. (Note: Google Streetview accessed 21 April 2018.)
93	4 Finch Road		4 Finch Road; 54.151132°N 4.480974°W	Douglas	27 July 1987	
94	6 Finch Road		6 Finch Road; 54.151691°N 4.480901°W	Douglas	27 July 1987	
95	8 Finch Road		8 Finch Road; 54.151301°N 4.481001°W	Douglas	27 July 1987	
96	12 Finch Road			Douglas	9 September 1987	
97	14 Finch Road		14 Finch Road; 54.151686°N 4.480901°W	Douglas	9 September 1987	
98	16 Finch Road			Douglas	27 July 1987	It is identified as the British Legion Club in map accompanying registration.
99	18 Finch Road			Douglas	27 July 1987	
100	20 Finch Road			Douglas	27 July 1987	
101	22 Finch Road			Douglas	27 July 1987	
102	24 Finch Road			Douglas	27 July 1987	
105	The Old thatch, Brunswick Road		54.160525°N 4.491505°W	Douglas	17 February 1988	Has thatched roof.
106	St Matthew's Church, North Quay		North Quay; 54.147750°N 4.480271°W	Douglas	19 September 1988	
107	The Rechabite Hall, Allan Street		Allan Street; 54.151619°N 4.486733°W	Douglas	9 November 1988	
112	The Falcon Cliff Hotel		Palace Road54.163719°N 4.471314°W	Douglas	11 September 1989	Built in 1836 to Gothic design of local architect John Robinson.
113	The Douglas Head Hotel		Douglas Head; 54.142473°N 4.469220°W	Douglas	11 September 1989	
114	The Salisbury Hotel, Victoria Street		Victoria Street; 54.149104°N 4.477342°W	Douglas	11 September 1989	
115	The Harbour Swing Bridge Tower and Mechanism		54.146690°N 4.477413°W	Douglas	11 September 1989	
120	The Market Buildings		North Quay; 54.147961°N 4.479013°W; 54.148088°N 4.478624°W	Douglas	11 September 1989	Iron pavilion buildings, with Butchers Market on west side of Market Hill road and Fish and Butter Market on east.
132	Red Pier Complex, King Edward Pier		King Edward Pier; 54.147201°N 4.475106°W	Douglas	20 July 1990	Last surviving vestige of former Red Pier complex.
134	The Coach House, Selbourne Drive		At corner of lanes behind Selbourne Drive and Albany Road; 54.158082°N 4.491227°W	Douglas	4 October 1990	
137	The Nook, Quarterbridge Road		Quarterbridge Road; 54.155913°N 4.500724°W	Douglas	15 April 1991	
145	Okells Brewery, Glen Falcon		54.158197°N 4.480471°W	Douglas	17 March 1992	See Okells Brewery
149	Douglas Head Lighthouse		54.143428°N 4.465806°W	Douglas	5 November 1993	
156	Facade and Foyer, Strand Cinema		Strand Street54.151376°N 4.479164°W	Douglas	11 July 1995	The Strand Theatre, built in 1913, was the first purpose-built cinema in the Isle of Man. Deemed "a strikingly good example of 'People's Palace' architecture".
159	"Ivydene", Little Switzerland		54.166629°N 4.467225°W	Douglas	26 January 1996	Baillie Scott-designed.
160	The Red House, Victoria Road		Victoria Road; 54.170321°N 4.469097°W	Douglas	26 January 1996	Baillie Scott-designed.
161	"Oakleigh", Glencrutchery Road		Glencrutchery Road (A2); 54.170115°N 4.471931°W	Douglas	26 January 1996	Baillie Scott-designed.
162	Myrtle Bank, Little Switzerland		54.167576°N 4.469402°W	Douglas	26 January 1996	Two-storey Baillie Scott-designed, semi-attached to Hollybank.
163	Hollybank, Little Switzerland		54.167576°N 4.469402°W	Douglas	26 January 1996	Baillie Scott-designed, semi-attached to Myrtle Bank.
164	Falcon Cliff Terrace, Ivy Cottage, Thie Bannee, Inglenook, Thorn Bank (Note: Name should perhaps be "Inglenook, Falcon Cliff Terrace"?)		Falcon Cliff Terrace; 54.164225°N 4.475923°W	Douglas	26 January 1996	A row house designed by Baillie Scott.
166	Cadran Cottage, Ballanard Road		Ballanard Road; 54.173232°N 4.489752°W	Douglas	15 September 1996	Pre-1869 cottage remodelled c.1910 with design by Manx designer Archibald Knox. Labelled with sign "Cadran Cottage".
167	Douglas Courthouse and 13 Athol Street		Athol Street; 54.149346°N 4.481685°W	Douglas	15 April 1997	Georgian-style building, probably a work of local architect John Robinson. By 2010, however, the facade of 13 Athol Street, or perhaps its entirety, has been replaced.
169	Douglas Town Hall and Public Library, Ridgeway Street		Ridgeway Street; 54.148792°N 4.480739°W	Douglas	22 May 1997	Town Hall with 47 by 32 feet (14.3 m × 9.8 m) arched-roof Council Chamber. With adjoining library which effectively served as a national library of the Isle of Man for many years. Built at cost of £25,708, in use by 1900.
173	Central Hotel		54.157372°N 4.477268°W	Douglas	25 June 1998	
174	1 Albert Terrace		1 Albert Terrace54.154826°N 4.482309°W	Douglas	25 June 1998	
177	Erin Brae, Queen's Promenade		Queen's Promenade; 54.165492°N 4.466909°W	Douglas	12 October 1998	Built c.1822. Has served as private residence and as a hotel. Later Kings Guest House.
178	St Thomas Church, Douglas		54.154419°N 4.479574°W	Douglas	14 June 1999	Built 1846–49 but soon closed due to dispute over patronage and not reopened until 1872.
179	Harold Tower, Douglas Head Road		54.144172°N 4.471322°W	Douglas	18 September 2000	Castellated octagonal tower/house, screened by trees, built in 1833 originally as a folly.
186	Douglas Hotel, North Quay		North Quay; 54.147923°N 4.478290°W	Douglas	26 July 2001	
187	1-12 Victoria Terrace, off Victoria Road		Victoria Terrace; 54.159651°N 4.478769°W	Douglas	15 August 2001	
188	All Saints Church, Alexander Drive		54.155965°N 4.48971°W	Douglas	15 August 2001	It includes a mural by local artist Dorothy Nicholson. Relatively modern church built on site of older historic one; closed in 2017.
190	Woodlands, Alexander Drive		Alexander Drive; 54.157917°N 4.496113°W	Douglas	31 October 2001	
191	Ravenscourt, Peel Road		Peel Road; 54.153965°N 4.499718°W	Douglas	31 October 2001	
192	Crescent Cinema, Central Promenade		Central Promenade; 54.159905°N 4.475184°W	Douglas	31 October 2001	
193	Old Brewer's House, Castle Hill		Castle Hill; 54.162870°N 4.475296°W	Douglas	31 October 2001	
195	The National Westminster Bank, Prospect Hill		Prospect Hill; 54.149392°N 4.480957°W	Douglas	20 September 2002	It was built in 1891 for George William Dumbbell's bank, which had been founded in 1853. It was expanded with a two-storey extension, adding to the three-storey original building, in 1891. Dumbbell's Bank failed dramatically on 3 February 1900, on what was known as Black Saturday, changing the lives of many.
196	Jubilee Clock, Victoria Street		Victoria Street & Loch Promenade; 54.149189°N 4.475991°W	Douglas	20 September 2002	Cast iron street clock, manufactured in Glasgow, erected for the 1887 Golden Jubilee of Queen Victoria as a gift by George William Dumbbell.
197	St Mary's of the Isle Catholic Church, Hill Street		Hill Street; 54.150655°N 4.482393°W	Douglas	20 September 2002	Built 1857–59.
198	The former Isle of Man Times Office, 9 Athol Street (Note: DEFA website lists as "The former Isle of Times Office, 9 Athol Street", error being that the word "Man" is omitted, relative to registration document.)		9 Athol Street; 54.149505°N 4.481408°W	Douglas	20 September 2002	Home from 1870 of the Isle of Man Times newspaper, with red brick facade described as French Chateauesque.
199	29-31 Athol Street		29–31 Athol Street; 54.148927°N 4.482771°W	Douglas	20 September 2002	
200	The Gaiety Theatre, Harris Promenade		Harris Promenade; 54.155194°N 4.478434°W	Douglas	24 September 2002	Opened in 1900.
201	The Queen's Hotel, Queen's Promenade		Queen's Promenade; 54.165343°N 4.467110°W	Douglas	20 September 2002	Public house which was built before 1826, probably originally as cottages and stables for Castle Mona. Called Queen's Hotel by 1854.
205	Tower of Refuge, St. Mary's Rock (also known as Conister Rock)		St. Mary's Rock, also known as Conister Rock; 54.1504°N 4.4687°W	Douglas	18 October 2002	Built in 1832 to mark shoal to avoid shipwrecks. Triangular with three turrets.
210	4-11 Harris Terrace		Harris Terrace; 54.153399°N 4.483484°W	Douglas	13 December 2002	Built in 1837.
213	Raven's Cliff, Fort Anne Road		Fort Anne Road; 54.144810°N 4.472227°W	Douglas	27 January 2003	
217	Arch Tower House, South Quay		South Quay; 54.145934°N 4.483990°W	Douglas	27 January 2003	Built 1853.
223	18a-20 Victoria Street		18a-20 Victoria Street; 54.149428°N 4.478645°W	Douglas	11 April 2005	
225	26 Victoria Street		26 Victoria Street; 54.149352°N 4.479146°W	Douglas	11 April 2005	
226	Ridgeway House, Ridgeway Street		Ridgeway Street; 54.148868°N 4.480331°W	Douglas	17 January 2005	
228	St Ninian's Church, Ballaquayle Road		Ballaquayle Road; 54.164894°N 4.483343°W	Douglas	22 July 2005	
230	Buck House Merton Bank		Merton Bank; 54.152996°N 4.484621°W	Douglas	20 December 2005	Also known as Agriculture House and was formerly a Primitive Methodist chapel.
234	Farmhill Manor, Farmhill Lane, IM2 2EF		Farmhill Lane; 54.154490°N 4.522767°W	Douglas	6 June 2006	Small mansion originally known as Ballaquirk, converted from a farmhouse during 1780–1825.
244	Former Methodist Church aka Red Cross House, Derby Road. IM2 3EN		54.157320°N 4.483781°W	Douglas	13 September 2007	
258	Old School House, Cronkbourne, Douglas, IM4 4QH		54.168641°N 4.497501°W	Douglas	3 February 2009	
289	Former Newson's Trading Building 27-28 North Quay		North Quay; 54.147728°N 4.481435°W	Douglas	13 April 2018	
290	IOM Bank Buildings 2 Athol Street		2 Athol Street; 54.149917°N 4.481107°W	Douglas	13 April 2018	
291	Douglas Bay Horse Tram Stables and 1-3, Tramway Terrace		Horse Tram Stables, Tramway Terrace, Summer Hill	Douglas	13 June 2018	
292	Freemasons’ Hall, Douglas		Woodbourne Road	Douglas	25 June 2018 (Note: The registration document has a blank date)	formerly a residence, converted to a Masonic lodge.
296	Trafalgar House (former Trafalgar Hotel)		South Quay	Douglas	7 April 2021	
312	Inkerman Memorial		The Nunnery, Old Castletown Road	Douglas	7 July 2021	
315	Douglas Borough War Memorial		Harris Promenade	Douglas	7 July 2021	
316	Goldie-Taubman Memorial		Douglas Head	Douglas	7 July 2021	Commemorates those lost in the First and Second World Wars
317	Douglas Cemetery War Memorial		Douglas Cemetery, Glencrutchery Road	Douglas	7 July 2021	Commemorates those lost in the First World War
327	K6 Telephone Kiosks (Pair), Drumgold Street		Drumgold Street	Douglas	1 September 2021	two of several telephone boxes which are registered buildings
339	Leyton		Victoria Road	Douglas	28 February 2024	
340	Legislative Buildings (Tynwald, House of Keys and Legislative Council Chambers)		Buck’s Road	Douglas	2 September 2025	Meeting place of the House of Keys and the Legislative Council
350	Former School of Art		Kensington Road	Douglas	2 September 2025	The island's first school of art, opened in 1880
351	Douglas Railway Station Workshops (Note: Full name: "Douglas Railway Station Workshops - Specifically the Fitting Shop, Blacksmith’s Shop, Stores, Locomotive Running Shed, Upholstery Shop, Joinery Shop, Paint Shop, former Crew Bothy Coach Body, PW Store, Tank House and Water Tanks")		Douglas Railway Station	Douglas	2 September 2025	
352	Douglas Railway Station Signal Box, Douglas, Isle of Man		Douglas Railway Station	Douglas	2 September 2025	
83	Tynwald Old Mill and original Mill Wheel, Fuller's Hammer and related machinery, St Johns		54.208354°N 4.632642°W	St John's, German	4 November 1985	Old mill on River Neb. Included in St John's Village Conservation Area.
268	Glyn Moar, Glyn Moar Road, St Johns, IM4 3AQ		Brack a Broom Lane; 54.206054°N 4.642113°W	St. John's, German	18 September 2012	Manx Gothic Revival-style estate house built c.1845, Included in St John's Village Conservation Area.
237	Guard House & Fire Party, 258 Jurby Industrial Estate, IM7 3BD		54.359153°N 4.521534°W	Jurby	26 March 2007	Later the Guard House Cafe.
238	Jurby Aerodrome Bomb Store, Jurby Industrial Estate		54.353730°N 4.511149°W	Jurby	26 March 2007	
239	Jurby Terminal Building, Jurby Industrial Estate		54.356371°N 4.521881°W	Jurby	26 March 2007	
240	Aeroplane & Seaplane Store, 266 Jurby Industrial Estate		54.358479°N 4.522100°W	Jurby	26 March 2007	
241.1	Pillbox at Field 211025		Ballavaran Road; 54.349793°N 4.524853°W	Jurby	26 March 2007	
241.2	Pillbox at Field 214188, Ballamoar		54.353387°N 4.512758°W	Jurby	26 March 2007	
241.3	Pillbox at Fields 210249 - 210250 & 210251, adjacent to Church Road		54.359478°N 4.533452°W	Jurby	26 March 2007	On Ballathona Farm.
241.4	Pillbox at Fields 210356 & 214288, adjacent to Jurby East Road		54.363973°N 4.516406°W	Jurby	26 March 2007	
241.5	Pillbox at Fields 210846 - 210872 & 210873, adjacent to Ballavarran Road		54.349490°N 4.530472°W	Jurby	26 March 2007	
241.6	Pillbox at Fields 211033 - 214136 & Jurby Aerodrome, Ballamoar		54.350822°N 4.518691°W	Jurby	26 March 2007	
241.7	Pillbox at Fields 214191 & 214197, adjacent to Church Road		54.354506°N 4.539802°W	Jurby	26 March 2007	
241.8	Pillbox at fields 214201 & 214286, adjacent to Jurby Road, Sandygate		54.359990°N 4.511418°W	Jurby	26 March 2007	
241.9	Pillbox between Studio House & Jurby Aerodrome, Ballavarran Road		54.353670°N 4.531657°W	Jurby	26 March 2007	
85	Christ Church		54.231490°N 4.405206°W	Laxey	21 January 1986	A Gothic Revival-style Church of England parish church. It was "consecrated in 1856 for the local Lead miners to worship in. It was built to a design by Ewan Christian and construction costs of £950 were paid for by the Mining Company." Was closed for renovations and reopened at Easter, 2014.
227	Laxey Working Mens Institute, New Road		17 New Road; 54.231365°N 4.406368°W	Laxey	17 January 2005	Originally opened 1876. Extensively renovations completed in 2011.
91	Staward Farm, Ballabrooie, Sulby		54.317879°N 4.483505°W	Lezayre	23 February 1987	
138	Kirk Christ Lezayre Parochial Church		54.318484°N 4.424983°W	Lezayre	11 July 1991	
168	Milntown House, Including the Old Mill, Mill Pond and Mill Race		Glen Auldyn Road; 54.319899°N 4.403852°W	Lezayre	21 May 1997	
170	St Stephens Church and former School Room, Sulby		54.319948°N 4.488619°W	Lezayre	22 April 1998	Together with its curtilage. Built in 1838, remodeled in 1880.
171	Sulby Old School, Sulby		54.319927°N 4.488974°W	Lezayre	22 April 1998	Built in 1879.
172	Sulby Methodist Church, Sulby		A14; 54.319308°N 4.491399°W	Lezayre	22 April 1998	Built in 1912–13, has stained glass reflecting Arts and Crafts movement.
13	Old Kirk Lonan (St Adamnan's) Ballamenagh Road, Baldrine		Ballamenagh Road, Baldrine; 54.186026°N 4.411509°W	Lonan	21 July 1983	St Adamnan's Church.
141	The Lane Mark Tower known as The Herring Tower, Langness		54.058661°N 4.621654°W	Malew	1 August 1991	
142	The Powder House, Langness		54.060549°N 4.620529°W	Malew	1 August 1991	
148	Langness Lighthouse		54.054878°N 4.625078°W	Malew	5 November 1993	Built in 1880.
181	Old School/House, St Mark's		St. Mark's; 54.134151°N 4.610225°W	Malew	6 December 2000	The school and a house for its master were built c.1845 in "Manx vernacular style". The school library had 302 volumes in 1847.
182	St Mark's Church, St Mark's		St. Mark's; 54.133836°N 4.610035°W	Malew	9 May 2001	Consecrated 1772.
184	Church Cottages, St Mark's		St. Mark's; 54.133464°N 4.610185°W	Malew	9 May 2001	Two of the row of cottages were rebuilt from a previous school in 1846; a third was added in 1899.
242	Glashen Farmhouse & attached Barn, Ballasalla		Ballasalla; 54.101727°N 4.621512°W	Malew	22 March 2007	
256	Malew Parish Church, Great Meadow IM9 4EB		54.09208°N 4.65442°W	Malew	8 April 2008	
267	Scarlett House, Castletown, IM9 1TB		54.066647°N 4.663632°W	Malew	18 September 2012	Home of William Sedden. 1717 date stone. c.1900 renovations.
284	Ballasalla Gate House		Station Road, Ballasalla; 54.095694°N 4.629412°W	Malew	1 March 2017	
285	Water Tower Ballasalla		Station Road, Ballasalla; 54.095694°N 4.629412°W	Malew	1 March 2017	The water tower is gone; perhaps substructure remains?
14	St Runius Church, Ellerslie		Garth Rd. 54.176288°N 4.573153°W	Marown	21 July 1983	
110	The South, East and West elements of the Courtyard at Ellerslie Farm		54.175206°N 4.569548°W	Marown	16 March 1989	
131	Ballaglass Power Station		54.279971°N 4.368505°W	Maughold	11 May 1989	Not included in Maughold Conservation Area.
202	School House (former Parochial or Central School)		School House Road; 54.292325°N 4.353301°W	Maughold	20 September 2002	Not included in Maughold Conservation Area.
300	Maughold Lighthouse Tower		Maughold Head; 54.295749°N 4.309419°W	Maughold	7 July 2021	Constructed 1914, still in operation, automated since 1993.
346	Ballure Manx Electric Railway Viaduct		Ballure Glen, Ramsey	Maughold	2 September 2025	a viaduct carrying the Manx Electric Railway
22	The Cottage, Bishopscourt		Main Rd. 54.298354°N 4.571961°W	Michael	26 September 1983	
23	The Refectory, Bishopscourt		Main Rd. 54.298308°N 4.572147°W	Michael	26 September 1983	Refectory
136	The Old Court House, Kirk Michael		Main Rd. 54.282242°N 4.587798°W	Michael	14 February 1991	
143	Orrisdale Limekiln, Glentrunk, Michael		54.298616°N 4.583609°W	Michael	15 October 1991	
245	Greystones Cottage, Main Road, Kirk Michael		54.284670°N 4.585986°W	Michael	31 July 2007	
248	St Michael's Church aka Kirk Michael and All Angels Church, Main Road		54.285246°N 4.586280°W	Michael	8 May 2009	
249	Orrisdale House, Orrisdale, Michael		54.305385°N 4.574813°W	Michael	3 December 2007	Seat of the Crellin family.
250	The Whitehouse, Main Road, Kirk Michael		Main Road (A3); 54.286273°N 4.576804°W	Michael	22 November 2007	Landmark set back from low wall along A3. Dates from before 1688, but present house built in the 1700s.
251	Church View House, Main Road, Kirk Michael		54.284902°N 4.585642°W	Michael	3 December 2007	
252	Spooyt Vane Sunday School, Ballaleigh Road, Kirk Michael		54.269282°N 4.598120°W	Michael	3 December 2007	Built c. 1860 at cost of £100.
294	Mitre Hotel		Main Road	Michael	7 April 2021	The oldest remaining pub on the Isle of Man
344	Former Kirk Michael Railway Station (now Kirk Michael Fire Station)		Station Road	Michael	2 September 2025	Now converted to a fire station. Only the passenger building is registered
117	Kate's Cottage, Keppel Gate		54.211235°N 4.477083°W	Onchan	11 September 1989	
118	St Peter's Church Hall, Royal Avenue		Royal Ave. 54.174399°N 4.454041°W	Onchan	11 September 1989	Also known as Onchan Parish Hall.
119	St Peter's Parish Church		Church Road; 54.174067°N 4.452009°W	Onchan	11 September 1989	Construction began in 1830, replacing previous church. Designed by Hanson and Welch. Modified in 1863 and 1913.
121	St Catherine's, St Catherine's Terrace		St Catherine's Terrace & Avondale Road; 54.174723°N 4.456192°W	Onchan	11 September 1989	
122	Welch House, Church Road		Church Road54.174654°N 4.452999°W	Onchan	11 September 1989	
123	Braeside, King Edward Road		King Edward Road; 54.170491°N 4.439295°W	Onchan	11 September 1989	Adjacent to Leafield. Baillie Scott-designed.
124	Leafield, King Edward Road		King Edward Road; 54.170449°N 4.439060°W	Onchan	11 September 1989	Adjacent to Braefield. Baillie Scott-designed.
125	19 Governor's Road		19 Governor's Road; 54.173105°N 4.459640°W	Onchan	11 September 1989	
126	21 Governor's Road		21 Governor's Road; 54.173119°N 4.459560°W	Onchan	11 September 1989	
127	23 Governor's Road		23 Governor's Road; 54.173135°N 4.459488°W	Onchan	11 September 1989	
128	25 Governor's Road		25 Governor's Road; 54.173142°N 4.459396°W	Onchan	11 September 1989	
129	27 Governor's Road		27 Governor's Road; 54.173158°N 4.459324°W	Onchan	11 September 1989	
133	Woodlands Towers, Ashley Road		54.184665°N 4.459014°W	Onchan	20 July 1991	
222	Clucas Laundry Old Engine Room, Chimneys and Sluices, Tromode		Carrs Lane, Tromode Industrial Estate; 54.170668°N 4.495733°W	Onchan	13 May 2004	
254	Government House		Governor's road (Note: "Government road" is written in the registration, possibly a mistake)	Onchan	2 May 2018	
287	Groudle Glen Hotel		Groudle Glen Hotel, King Edward Road	Onchan	15 October 2019 (Note: The registration document has a blank date)	
320	Onchan Parish War Memorial		Main Road	Onchan	7 July 2021	Cross and three stone tables with names of those lost in the First and Second World Wars, The Troubles, and the Gulf War
324	K8 Telephone Kiosk, Summer Hill Road		Summer Hill Road	Onchan	1 September 2021	one of several telephone boxes which are registered buildings
325	K8 Telephone Kiosk, Summer Hill Road		Hillberry Road	Onchan	1 September 2021	one of several telephone boxes which are registered buildings
348	Manx Electric Railway Viaduct, Groudle		King Edward Road over the Groudle River	Onchan	2 September 2025	a viaduct carrying the Manx Electric Railway
8	Thatched house at Niarbyl Beach		Niarbyl Rd.54.163386°N 4.740459°W	Patrick	23 May 1983	Cottage with thatched roof.
157	The Village House, Foxdale		A3, Foxdale54.169277°N 4.638730°W	Patrick	31 October 1995	
263	The Banqueting Hall, Ballamoar Farm, Patrick Road, Patrick		Patrick Road; 54.206113°N 4.685481°W	Patrick	19 January 2009	Two-storey building within Ballamoar Farm. Rented out as The Coach House at Ballmoar Farm.
286	Clock Tower Foxdale		54.169258°N 4.633375°W	Patrick	1 February 2017	
301	Corrins Tower			Patrick	20 July 2021	
331	K6 Telephone Kiosk, The Hope		The Hope, St Johns	Patrick	1 September 2021	one of several telephone boxes which are registered buildings
335	K6 Telephone Kiosk, Patrick Village		Patrick Village	Patrick	13 September 2021	one of several telephone boxes which are registered buildings
89	Philip Christian Centre, Christian Street		Christian Street; P54.222863°N 4.690955°W	Peel	6 May 1986	
104	The Foundry, East Quay		East Quay; 54.223830°N 4.697492°W	Peel	21 September 1987	
108	8 Dwellings, numbered 5-9 Charles Street and 1-11 Queen Street		54.223888°N 4.695131°W	Peel	1 January 2002	(Note: DEFA website does not currently (April 2018) provide online registration documents for "8 Dwellings, numbered 5–9 Charles Street and 1–11 Queen Street", in Peel.)
111	The former premises of T Moore & Sons, Mill Road, Peel (The Kipperyard)		Mill Road; 54.220401°N 4.699556°W	Peel	23 August 1989	Now Moore's Traditional Museum.
194	Primitive Methodist Chapel		54.222841°N 4.690546°W	Peel	31 October 2001	Opened in 1878, a Primitive Methodist chapel.
204	St. German's Cathedral		54.221667°N 4.691111°W	Peel	18 October 2002	Red sandstone and slate cruciform cathedral built 1879–83. Also known as Peel Cathedral.
266	Peel Police Station (formerly Peel Court House), Derby Road, Peel		Derby Rd. 54.222053°N 4.689979°W With photos.	Peel	20 October 2014	Built in 1892 to 1893 to the designs of architect Langton Dennis.
270	Peel Harbour Masters Office		East Quay; 54.224372°N 4.697427°W	Peel	17 February 2017	Peel Coastguard Museum now.
302	Custom House		Crown Street	Peel	7 July 2021	Constructed 1863, adjacent to the Harbour Master's Office listed above.
328	K6 Telephone Kiosk, Peel Promenade		Promenade	Peel	13 September 2021	one of several telephone boxes which are registered buildings
349	Former Railway Station and Water Tower (Note: Full name: "Former Railway Station (now forming part of House of Manannan) and Water Tower")		Station Place and Mill Road	Peel	2 September 2025	Current building constructed 1907, operation ceased 1969
6	Primrose Thatched Cottage, St Marys Road		St. Mary's Road; 54.081534°N 4.760060°W	Port Erin	23 May 1983	Early farm workers cottage with thatched roof.
282	Port Erin Railway Station and associated Locomotive and Goods Sheds		Port Erin Railway Station, Station Road	Port Erin	17 October 2018	
295	Cosy Nook		Shore Road	Port Erin	7 April 2021	Two dwelling houses, converted to café at start of 20th century
303	Milner’s Tower		Bradda Head, Tower Road, Spaldrick	Port Erin	22 July 2021	William Milner was a locksmith who funded the construction of St. Catherine’s Church in Port Erin
305	Range Front (Leading Light) Lighthouse		Shore Road	Port Erin	7 July 2021	
306	Former Lifeboat House		Breakwater Road	Port Erin	7 July 2021	
307	Harbourmaster's Office And Coal Shed, Port Erin		Breakwater Road	Port Erin	7 July 2021	
329	K6 Telephone Kiosk, Lower Promenade, Port Erin		Shore Road	Port Erin	1 September 2021	one of several telephone boxes which are registered buildings
7	Cott Ny Greiney, Beach Road		Beach Road; 54.081890°N 4.731990°W	Port St Mary	23 May 1983	Cottage with thatched roof with traditional two-room plan.
203	The Old Sail Loft, Shore Road		The Underway; 54.073019°N 4.738083°W	Port St Mary	20 September 2002	Sail maker's loft building and adjacent cottage.
281	Port St Mary Railway Station and associated Goods Shed		Port St Mary Railway Station, Station Road	Port St Mary	7 October 2018	
283	Gatekeepers Hut, Port St Mary		Gatekeepers Hut, Castletown Road	Port St Mary	3 March 2017	
304	Lifeboat House, Port St Mary		The Quay	Port St Mary	7 July 2021	
322	Mona's Queen (Dunkirk) Memorial		Clifton Road	Port St Mary	7 July 2021	
330	K6 Telephone Kiosk, Queens Road, Port St Mary		Queens Road	Port St Mary	13 September 2021	one of several telephone boxes which are registered buildings
10	Mysore Cottages, 37, 39, 41 & 43 Waterloo Road		54.319912°N 4.379155°W	Ramsey	19 July 1983	One-storey stone cottages, semi-detached.
79	Ramsey Court House, Parliament Street		54.321354°N 4.380937°W	Ramsey	26 April 1985	
80	Our Lady of the Star and Sea St Maughold's Roman Catholic Church, Queens Promenade		Queens Promenade54.321929°N 4.378350°W	Ramsey	26 April 1985	
84	St Paul's Church, Market Square		Market Square; 54.321161°N 4.379401°W	Ramsey	27 November 1985	
87	Ramsey Youth Centre, Waterloo Road		Waterloo Road; 54.319720°N 4.378898°W	Ramsey	19 February 1986	
88	Lough House, Approach Road		Approach Road; 54.319711°N 4.378139°W	Ramsey	18 April 1986	
90	Ballure Church		54.315764°N 4.376650°W	Ramsey	8 May 1986	Church apparently also known as St. Mary's Church, per identification in map in the registration document.
139	Warehouse building at 26 West Quay		26 West Quay; 54.322700°N 4.384341°W	Ramsey	1 August 1991	
144	The Saddle Hotel, Parliament Street		54.321556°N 4.380215°W	Ramsey	1 January 1991	Has facades facing west upon Parliament Street and east upon Market Place.
151	2, 4, 6, 8, 10, 12, 14, 16, & 18, Albion Terrace		Lezayre Road (A3); 54.321970°N 4.388196°W	Ramsey	24 August 1994	
152	3, 4, 5, 6, 7, 8, 9 & 10 Auckland Terrace & West House		54.322389°N 4.385319°W	Ramsey	24 August 1994	
154	Queen's Pier, Ramsey		54.319444°N 4.370507°W	Ramsey	6 February 1995	
155	Ballure Inn		7 Ballure Road (A2); 54.316672°N 4.374530°W	Ramsey	12 July 1995	Originally a farmhouse, later an inn. Also known as Snowdrop Cottage. Listing includes barn/garage of 8 Ballure Road.
176	The Central Hotel		54.322207°N 4.386941°W	Ramsey	30 September 1998	Also known as the Old High Bailiff's Residence, was home of Frederick Tellet, longest-serving High Bailiff. Probably built as residence for Thomas Mylrea around 1797.
206	May Hill House (formerly Cronk Brae), May Hill		A18; 54.319080°N 4.382259°W	Ramsey	18 October 2002	
211	Beach Cottage, Ballure Road		54.317053°N 4.374655°W	Ramsey	27 January 2003	Merchant's home with private route down cliff to beach used for trading, built by 1700, pre-dates Ramsey harbour. Two houses converted into one.
212	Ballure Cottage, Ballure Road		Ballure Road (A2); 54.313855°N 4.373849°W	Ramsey	27 January 2003	
214	The Albert Tower		54.312937°N 4.379684°W	Maughold (Note: DEFA website identifies The Albert Tower as being located in Ramsey. It is located just outside Ramsey in Maughold.)	27 January 2003	Built in 1848 to commemorate 1847 visit by Albert, Prince Consort.
215	Dunluce, Ballure Road		Ballure Road; 54.314830°N 4.373551°W	Ramsey	27 January 2003	
216	Sea Cliff, Ballure Road (Note: DEFA website lists as "Sea Cliffe", but sign on gate visible in Google Streetview, and registration document record as "Sea Cliff".)		Ballure Road; 54.316914°N 4.374557°W	Ramsey	27 January 2003	
218	Riverside Cottage, Bridge Lane		Bridge Lane; 54.325139°N 4.389508°W	Ramsey	9 May 2003	Two-storey Manx vernacular stone cottage, with no river view.
219	15 Riverside Cottages, Bridge Lane		54.325010°N 4.388687°W	Ramsey	9 May 2003	Built before 1755 probably as a farm-worker cottage.
220	17 Riverside Cottages, Bridge Lane		54.324976°N 4.388731°W	Ramsey	9 May 2003	
221	Bridge Inn, Bowring Road		Bowring Road54.324785°N 4.388584°W	Ramsey	9 May 2003	
246	Beaconsfield Towers, Jurby Road, Ramsey		54.328548°N 4.392275°W	Ramsey	31 July 2007	Known also as Monk's Mill and as Lezayre Steam and Wind Mills. Two-storey tall base of a windmill formerly 64 feet (20 m) tall, and associated corn mill and saw mill and other buildings.
9	Rose Cottage, Surby Road, Surby (Note: DEFA website identifies location as "Sulby Road, Sulby", but "Surby Road, Surby" is apparently intended. Listing document has "Surby". There is a "Sulby" in an entirely different location of Isle of Man)		Greenway Road54.101391°N 4.741596°W	Rushen	23 May 1983	Has thatched roof. Appears not to be one of houses rethatched by "Master Thatchers, although they report they did thatch a roof in Surby.
279	Colby Level Gate Hut, Colby		Croit-E-Caley; 54.091636°N 4.721173°W	Rushen	21 October 2014	Stone house for railway gatekeeper, 15 by 10 feet (4.6 m × 3.0 m) in plan.
280	Ballagawne Gate House, Mount Gawne Road, Colby		Mount Gawne Rd. 54.088490°N 4.731339°W	Rushen	21 October 2014	
308	Upper Lighthouse		Calf of Man	Rushen	7 July 2021	
309	Lower Lighthouse		Calf of Man	Rushen	7 July 2021	
310	Chicken Rock Lighthouse		Off Calf of Man	Rushen	7 July 2021	
334	K6 Telephone Kiosk, Cregneash		Cregneash Village	Rushen	1 September 2021	one of several telephone boxes which are registered buildings
275	Kentraugh House and Estate (Note: Full name: "Kentraugh House, including all curtilage structures appertaining thereto and in addition the Ice House, Bone and Saw Mill, and Estate Wall")		Kentraugh, Shore Road	Rushen	29 September 2021	
15	Santon Parish Church (St Sanctain's), Church Road		Arragon Veg Rd. 54.108422°N 4.585653°W	Santon	21 July 1983	The church was rebuilt most recently in 1774, perhaps after a fire. It was previously rebuilt c.1720–1730.
209	Mullinaragher		Mullinaragher Rd. 54.128221°N 4.590570°W	Santon	11 December 2002	Farm complex.
278	Railway Station, Main Road, Santon, IM4 1EH		54.118206°N 4.584157°W	Santon	21 October 2014	Wooden station building built in 1875. Was at risk of being lost in the 1980s; a railway society stepped in to pay for repairs.

== Conservation Areas ==
	Official name	Image	Location	Parish /local authority area	Date of registration	Note
1	Douglas (North Quay) Conservation Area		Douglas, Isle of Man (Note: See location within Douglas in map at "Douglas Conservation Areas" (PDF). Department of Infrastructure, Isle of Man.)			Includes about five Registered Buildings.
2	Douglas (Little Switzerland) Conservation Area		Douglas, Isle of Man			Includes three Registered Buildings.
3	Douglas (Ballaquayle Road) Conservation Area		Douglas, Isle of Man			Includes no Registered Buildings.
4	Douglas (Selborne Drive) Conservation Area		Douglas, Isle of Man			Includes four Registered Buildings.
5	Douglas (Windsor Road) Conservation Area		Douglas, Isle of Man			Includes about 10 Registered Buildings.
6	Douglas (Olympia) Conservation Area		Douglas, Isle of Man			Includes four Registered Buildings.
7	Douglas (Woodbourne Road) Conservation Area		Douglas, Isle of Man			Includes three Registered Buildings.
8	Douglas Promenades Conservation Area		Douglas, Isle of Man			Includes about 12 Registered Buildings.
9	Douglas (Athol Street/Victoria Street/Duke Street) Conservation Area		Douglas, Isle of Man			Includes about 14 Registered Buildings.
10	Silverdale Conservation Area			Silverdale		Along Silver Burn running south from the A3 to the A7; includes Cregg Mill (54.10638°N 4.63831°W), Silverdale Glen (Manx National Heritage), Monks’ Bridge (c.1350), and Rushen Abbey. Has no Registered Buildings.
11	Castletown Conservation Area		Castletown			
12	Laxey Conservation Area		Laxey			Laxey
13	Onchan Conservation Area		Onchan			Onchan
14	Maughold Conservation Area		Maughold			Includes no Registered Buildings.
15	St John's Village Conservation Area		St John's			Includes Tynwald Hill, and Registered Buildings Tynwald Old Mill (aka St. John's Mill) and Glyn Moar, and all or part of Tynwald National Park and Arboretum (which was designated a Bird Sanctuary in 1982, and also protected under 1990 wildlife act).
16	St Marks Village Conservation Area		St Marks			
17	Glen Wyllin Conservation Area		Glen Wyllin			Glen Wyllin
18	Kirk Michael Conservation Area		Kirk Michael			
19	Ramsey Conservation Area		Ramsey			
20	Peel Conservation Area		Peel			It's an area of many properties.
21	Colby Conservation Area		Colby			

== See also ==
- List of churches on the Isle of Man
- Windmills in the Isle of Man
