= List of shipwrecks in January 1832 =

The list of shipwrecks in January 1832 includes ships sunk, foundered, grounded, or otherwise lost during January 1832.

== 1 January ==
List of shipwrecks: 1 January 1832
Ship	State	Description
William the Fourth	United Kingdom	The ship departed from São Miguel for London. No further trace, presumed foundered with the loss of all hands.

== 2 January ==
List of shipwrecks: 2 January 1832
Ship	State	Description
Acorn	United Kingdom	The ship was driven ashore and wrecked 20 nautical miles (37 km) from Sligo. She was on a voyage from Newport, Monmouthshire to Sligo.
Selvstandigkert	Norway	The ship was driven ashore and wrecked between Bergen and Trondheim. She was on a voyage from St. Ubes, Spain to Trondheim.

== 3 January ==
List of shipwrecks: 3 January 1832
Ship	State	Description
Telemachus	United Kingdom	The ship was driven ashore and wrecked near Riga, Russia.

=== 4 January ===
List of shipwrecks: 4 January 1832
Ship	State	Description
Ida	United Kingdom	The ship sprang a leak and was abandoned in the Atlantic Ocean. All on board were rescued by Gem (France). Ida was on a voyage from Newfoundland, British North America to Liverpool, Lancashire.

== 6 January ==
List of shipwrecks: 6 January 1832
Ship	State	Description
Mary	United Kingdom	The ship was wrecked on the Île à Vache, Haiti. All on board were rescued. She was on a voyage from Belfast, County Antrim to New Orleans, Louisiana, United States.
New Diligence	United Kingdom	The ship was driven ashore and wrecked in Dundrum Bay.

== 7 January ==
List of shipwrecks: 7 January 1832
Ship	State	Description
George Canning	United Kingdom	The brig was driven ashore near the Tybee Island Lighthouse, Georgia, United States. All on board were rescued. She was on a voyage from Greenock, Renfrewshire to Savannah, Georgia. George Canning was refloated on 31 January and beached near Absecon, New Jersey.
Richmond	United States	The ship was driven ashore at Gibraltar.

== 8 January ==
List of shipwrecks: 8 January 1832
Ship	State	Description
Mediterranean	United Kingdom	The ship sank at Holyhead, Anglesey. She was on a voyage from London to Liverpool, Lancashire.

== 9 January ==
List of shipwrecks: 9 January 1832
Ship	State	Description
Minerva	United Kingdom	The ship sprang a leak and foundered whilst on a voyage from Galway to Cork. Her crew were rescued.

== 10 January ==
List of shipwrecks: 10 January 1832
Ship	State	Description
Louisiana	(United Kingdom of Great Britain and Ireland) British North America	The ship was wrecked off West Point Island, Falkland Islands. Her crew were rescued.

== 11 January ==
List of shipwrecks: 11 January 1832
Ship	State	Description
Majestic	United Kingdom	The ship was abandoned in the Atlantic Ocean. She was on a voyage from Saint Andrews, New Brunswick, British North America to Liverpool, Lancashire.
Mary	United Kingdom	The barque was wrecked off Saint Domingue. All on board were rescued. She was on a voyage from Belfast, County Antrim to New Orleans, Louisiana, United States.
New Betsey	France	The ship was wrecked on the Group Rocks, in the Pacific Ocean. Her crew were rescued by James (United Kingdom).
Thane of Fife	United Kingdom	The sloop was wrecked at North Berwick, Lothian. Her crew were rescued. She was on a voyage from Banff, Aberdeenshire to London.

== 12 January ==
List of shipwrecks: 12 January 1832
Ship	State	Description
Chester	United Kingdom	The ship was wrecked on Dreswick Point, Isle of Man. Her crew were rescued. She was on a voyage from Whitehaven, Cumberland to Douglas, Isle of Man.

== 13 January ==
List of shipwrecks: 13 January 1832
Ship	State	Description
Good Intent	United Kingdom	The ship was driven ashore and wrecked near Ostend, West Flanders, Belgium. She was on a voyage from London to Ostend.

== 16 January ==
List of shipwrecks: 16 January 1832
Ship	State	Description
Mackay	(United Kingdom of Great Britain and Ireland) Antigua	The mailboat was wrecked at Nevis.

== 17 January ==
List of shipwrecks: 17 January 1832
Ship	State	Description
Argosy	United Kingdom	The ship sprang a leak and was abandoned by her crew in the Atlantic Ocean 60 nautical miles (110 km) off Cape Ortegal, Spain. She was on a voyage from Aberdeen to London.
Enterprize	United Kingdom	The ship was driven ashore in the Humber. She was on a voyage from Barcelona, Spain to Hull, Yorkshire. Enterprize was refloated on 25 January and taken in to Hull.

== 19 January ==
List of shipwrecks: 19 January 1832
Ship	State	Description
Elizabeth	(United Kingdom of Great Britain and Ireland) British North America	The brig was driven ashore at Bakers Island, Massachusetts, United States and was abandoned by her crew. She was refloated in mid-February.
Elizabeth	United Kingdom	The ship was wrecked on Mount Desert Island, Maine, United States. Her crew were rescued. She was on a voyage from Galway to Saint John, New Brunswick, British North America.

== 20 January ==
List of shipwrecks: 20 January 1832
Ship	State	Description
Friendship	United States	The ship was wrecked on Castle Island, Bermuda. Her crew were rescued. She was on a voyage from Jérémie, Haiti to Portsmouth, New Hampshire.
Johns	United Kingdom	The ship was wrecked whilst on a voyage from Liverpool, Lancashire to Saint Thomas, Virgin Islands. All on board were rescued.

== 21 January ==
List of shipwrecks: 21 January 1832
Ship	State	Description
Ann	United Kingdom	The ship was wrecked in Jamaica. She was on a voyage from Gibraltar to Veracruz, Mexico.
Union	United Kingdom	The ship foundered in the Atlantic Ocean off Lisbon, Portugal. Her crew survived. She was on a voyage from St. Ubes, Spain to Bergen, Norway.

== 22 January ==
List of shipwrecks: 22 January 1832
Ship	State	Description
Mentor	(United Kingdom of Great Britain and Ireland) Jamaica	The ship capsized off the coast of Jamaica. All on board survived.

== 23 January ==
List of shipwrecks: 23 January 1832
Ship	State	Description
Snipe	United Kingdom	The ship was wrecked on the "Northern Triangles", British Honduras. She was on a voyage from British Honduras to London.

== 24 January ==
List of shipwrecks: 24 January 1832
Ship	State	Description
Albion	United Kingdom	The ship was severely damaged by fire at Hull, Yorkshire.
Cassandra	United Kingdom	The ship was abandoned whilst on a voyage from Bristol, Gloucestershire to Belfast, County Antrim. She was towed in to Port Ellen, Islay on 2 February.
Elizabeth	United Kingdom	The ship was wrecked on one of the Cranberry Isles, Maine, United States. She was on a voyage from Galway to Saint John, New Brunswick, British North America.
Hoffnung	Russia	The ship was sunk by ice in the Zuiderzee. She was on a voyage from Riga to "Laandam", Netherlands.
Hudson	United Kingdom	The ship sprang a leak and was abandoned in the Atlantic Ocean. She was on a voyage from Bengal, India to Boston, Lincolnshire.
Union	Norway	The ship sprang a leak and foundered whilst on a voyage from St. Ubes, Spain to Bergen. Her crew were rescued.

== 25 January ==
List of shipwrecks: 25 January 1832
Ship	State	Description
Hope	United Kingdom	The ship was wrecked on the Goodwin Sands, Kent with the loss of all hands. She was on a voyage from London to Limerick

== 26 January ==
List of shipwrecks: 26 January 1832
Ship	State	Description
Bittern	United Kingdom	The brig was wrecked east of Dunfanaghy, County Donegal with the loss of four of her crew. She was on a voyage from Glasgow, Renfrewshire to Kilrush, County Antrim and Dublin.
Maria Louisa	United Kingdom	The ship departed from Waterford for Padstow, Cornwall. No further trace, presumed foundered with the loss of all hands.

== 27 January ==
List of shipwrecks: 27 January 1832
Ship	State	Description
Apollo	United Kingdom	The ship was driven ashore at Anderby, Lincolnshire. Her crew were rescued. She was refloated on 31 January.
Friends	United Kingdom	The ship foundered in the North Sea off Spurn Point, Yorkshire. Her crew were rescued.
Harmony	United Kingdom	The ship was wrecked at Foreness Point, Kent. She was on a voyage from Bangor to London.
Karen Wilhelmina	Denmark	The ship was abandoned in the Kattegat off Fredrikshavn. She was on a voyage from Hull, Yorkshire, United Kingdom to Nyborg.

== 28 January ==
List of shipwrecks: 28 January 1832
Ship	State	Description
Thomas and Eleanor	United Kingdom	The ship was wrecked at Portsoy, Aberdeenshire.

== 29 January ==
List of shipwrecks: 29 January 1832
Ship	State	Description
Ariadne	United Kingdom	The ship sprang a leak and was beached at Grimsby, Lincolnshire. She was on a voyage from Newcastle upon Tyne, Northumberland to a French port.

== 30 January ==
List of shipwrecks: 30 January 1832
Ship	State	Description
Margaretta	Lübeck	The ship was driven ashore and wrecked at Uddevalla, Sweden. She was on a voyage from London, United Kingdom to Lübeck.
Royal Charlotte	United Kingdom	The ship was wrecked on the Île de Ré, Charente-Maritime, France with the loss of all hands. She was on a voyage from the Charente to London and Hull, Yorkshire.

== 31 January ==
List of shipwrecks: 31 January 1832
Ship	State	Description
Anna and Mary	United Kingdom	The ship was driven ashore on Schouwen, South Holland, Netherlands. She was on a voyage from Trieste to Antwerp, Belgium.
Eclipse	United Kingdom	The ship was wrecked on La Palma, Canary Islands, Spain with the loss of four lives. She was on a voyage from London to the Cape of Good Hope.
Jean	United Kingdom	The ship was wrecked off Hoy, Orkney Islands.
Scipio	United Kingdom	The ship was wrecked near Tory Island, County Donegal. She was on a voyage from Limerick to the Clyde.

== Unknown date ==
List of shipwrecks: Unknown date January 1832
Ship	State	Description
Bittern	United Kingdom	The ship was wrecked at "Sheephead", County Donegal. She was on a voyage from Liverpool, Lancashire to Limerick.
Experiment	United Kingdom	The ship foundered in the Atlantic Ocean off São Miguel, Azores, Portugal. Her crew survived. She was on a voyage from São Miguel to London.
Greyhound	United Kingdom	The ship was lost on "Goree Island". Her crew were rescued. She was on a voyage from Dunkirk, Nord, France to Rotterdam, South Holland, Netherlands.
John Gilmore	United States	The schooner was abandoned in the Atlantic Ocean. Her crew were rescued by Excellent (United Kingdom).
Lise	France	The ship departed from Bordeaux, Gironde for Bristol, Gloucestershire, United Kingdom. No further trace, presumed foundered with the loss of all hands.
Maria	United Kingdom	The ship was wrecked on Brion Island, Lower Canada, British North America. Her crew were rescued. She was on a voyage from Quebec City, Lower Canada to Greenock, Renfrewshire.
Nancy	United Kingdom	The ship was wrecked on Cape Sable Island, Lower Canada before 15 January. She was on a voyage from Jamaica to Halifax, Nova Scotia, British North America.
Windermere	United Kingdom	The ship was abandoned at sea whilst on a voyage from Africa to Liverpool.
