= Ramsey Windmill =

Ramsey Windmill may refer to the following windmills:

- Ramsey Windmill, Cambridgeshire, England
- Ramsey Windmill, Essex, England
- Lezayre Mill, Ramsey, Isle of Man
