= Lorne House =

Lorne House may refer to:

- Lorne House, Castletown, Isle of Man, a registered building of the Isle of Man
- Lorne House, Uppingham School, Rutland, England, one of Uppingham School's houses
- Lorne House, Box, Wiltshire, England
- Lorne Estate, Holywood, Ulster, Northern Ireland
