= St Mark's, Isle of Man =

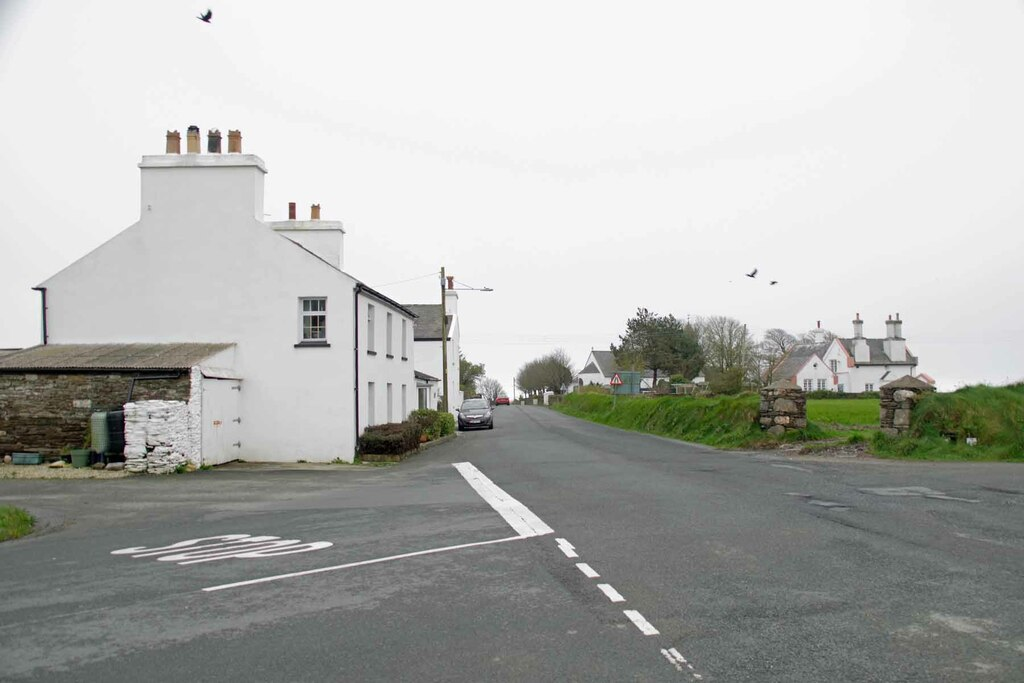
St Mark's

St Mark's on the Isle of Man is a hamlet or other unincorporated area within the parish of Malew. It includes St. Mark's Church and two other Registered Buildings, and is the centre of a Conservation Area.

== St. Mark's Church ==
St Mark's Church, St Mark's is Registered Building #182, listed 9 May 2001. 54.133836°N 4.610035°W

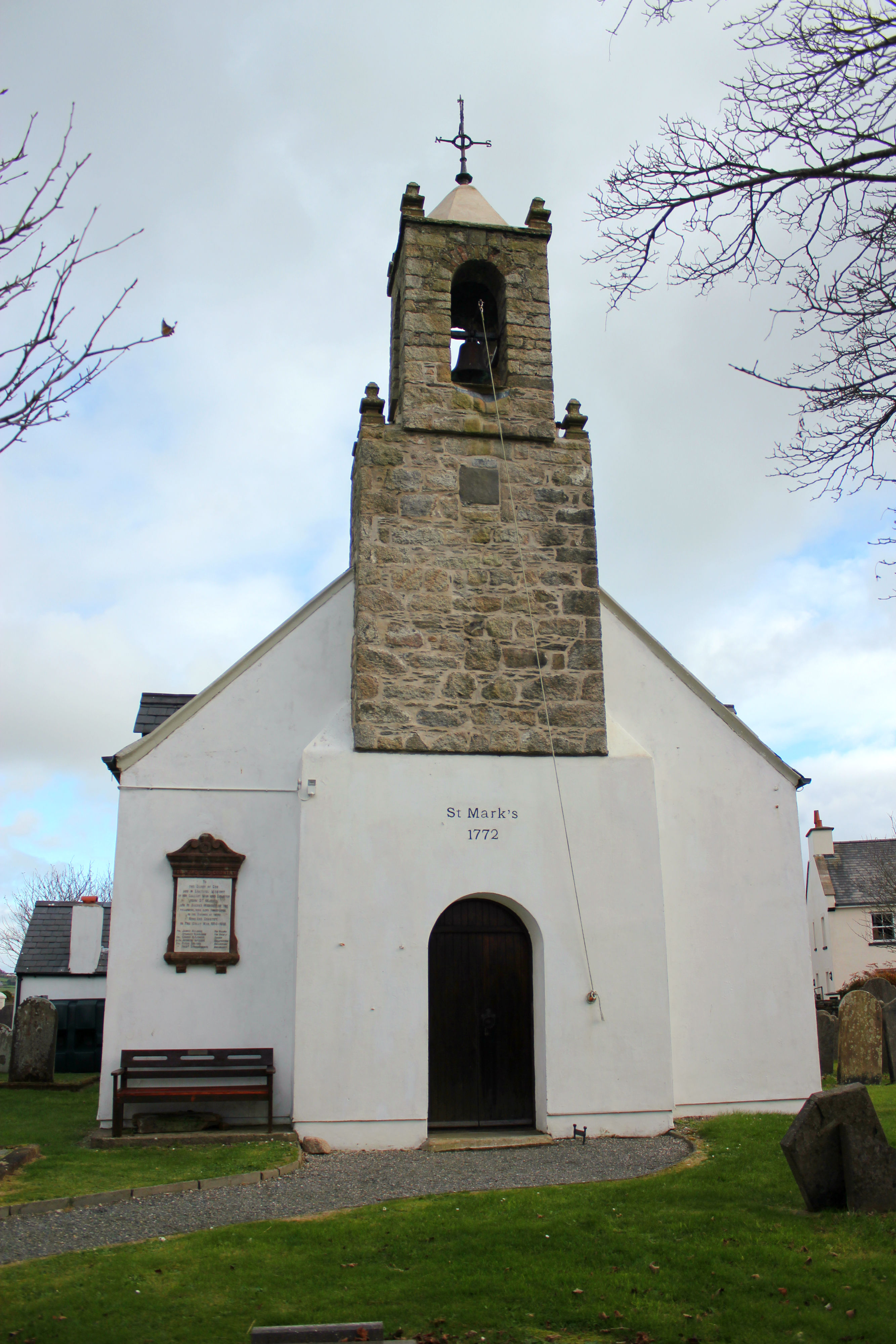
St. Mark's Church

It was consecrated in 1772.

== Old School/House, St. Mark's ==
Old School/House, St Mark's is Registered Building #181, listed 6 December 2000.

54.134151°N 4.610225°W

The school and a house for its master were built c.1845 in "Manx vernacular style". The school library had 302 volumes in 1847.

== Church Cottages, St. Mark's ==
Church Cottages, St Mark's are Registered Building #184, listed 9 May 2001.

54.133464°N 4.610185°W

They are a row of cottages at St. Mark's. Two of the row of cottages were rebuilt from a previous school in 1846; a third was added in 1899.

== St. Mark's Village Conservation Area ==
St. Mark's is the centre of the St. Mark's Village Conservation Area, established in 2003, one of Isle of Man's 21 Conservation Areas.
