= St Paul's, Ramsey =

Church in Ramsey, Isle of Man

Coordinates: 54°19′16″N 4°22′46″W

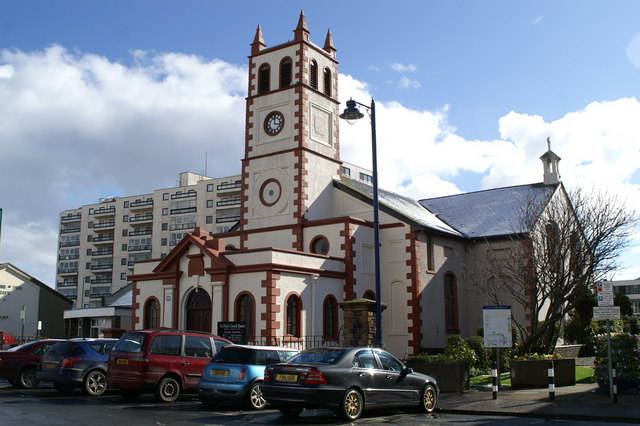
St. Paul's, Ramsey

St. Paul's is a church in Ramsey designed by Thomas Brine and consecrated in 1822. In 1830 a west gallery for musicians was erected, and two side wings were added in 1844. In 1874 a new vestry was added and in 1938 a new porch was added. This building is one of the buildings of Old Ramsey remaining in this part of the town, with the town being rebuilt to the South of here in the 1960s.

It was listed as one of Isle of Man's Registered Buildings in 1985.
