= Albert Tower =

Historic monument

Coordinates: 54.312937°N 4.379684°W

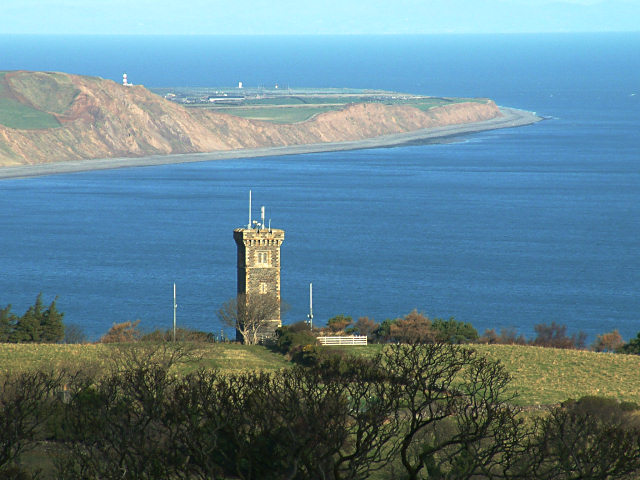
The Albert Tower

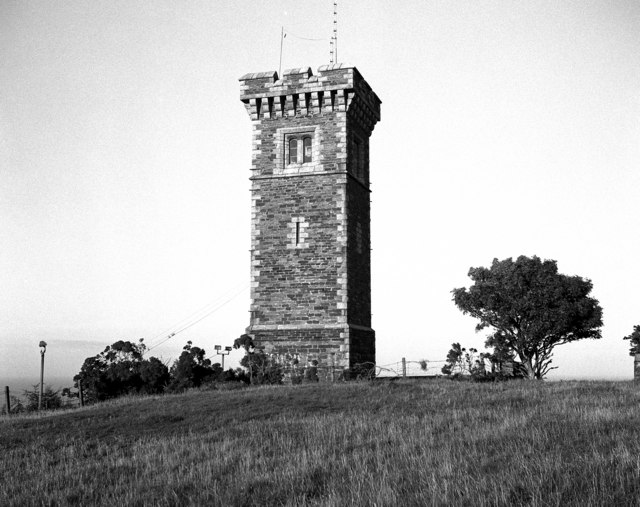
The Albert Tower

The Albert Tower on the Isle of Man is a historic monument which is one of Isle of Man's Registered Buildings. It was registered on 27 January 2003 as number 214.

The 45 feet (14 m) high slate and granite tower was built in 1848 to commemorate the visit of Albert, Prince Consort to the spot in the previous year. It was used as a lookout in World War II and has been closed since.

== History ==
The tower is located on Lhergy Frissell in the parish of Maughold, but only about 100 metres (330 ft) south of the boundary with Ramsey and overlooking the town of Ramsey. The base of the tower is at an altitude of about 130 metres (430 ft). The Tower Bends, an S-curve feature of the Snaefell Mountain Course is nearby and named for it.

It is a location visited by Albert, Prince Consort on 20 September 1847. Queen Victoria, his wife, stayed on their ship offshore. In 1848 the monument/tower was built, the foundation stone being laid by Mrs Eden who was the wife of Robert Eden, 3rd Baron Auckland the Bishop of Sodor and Man. It was designed by George W. Buck and cost £300 to build.

During World War II it was used as a lookout tower by the Home Guard. After the war access to the tower was stopped because of the poor state of the staircase within the tower.

In 2005 a two pence coin was minted for the Isle of Man with an image of the tower on it.

== Architecture ==
The granite and marble blue slate tower is 45 feet (14 m) high. It bears an inscription saying "Erected on the spot where HRH. Prince Albert stood to view Ramsey and its neighbourhood during the visit of Her Most Gracious Majesty Queen Victoria to Ramsey Bay, the 20th of September, 1847."
