= All Saints Church, Douglas =

Church in Douglas, Isle of Man

Coordinates: 54.155965°N 4.489710°W

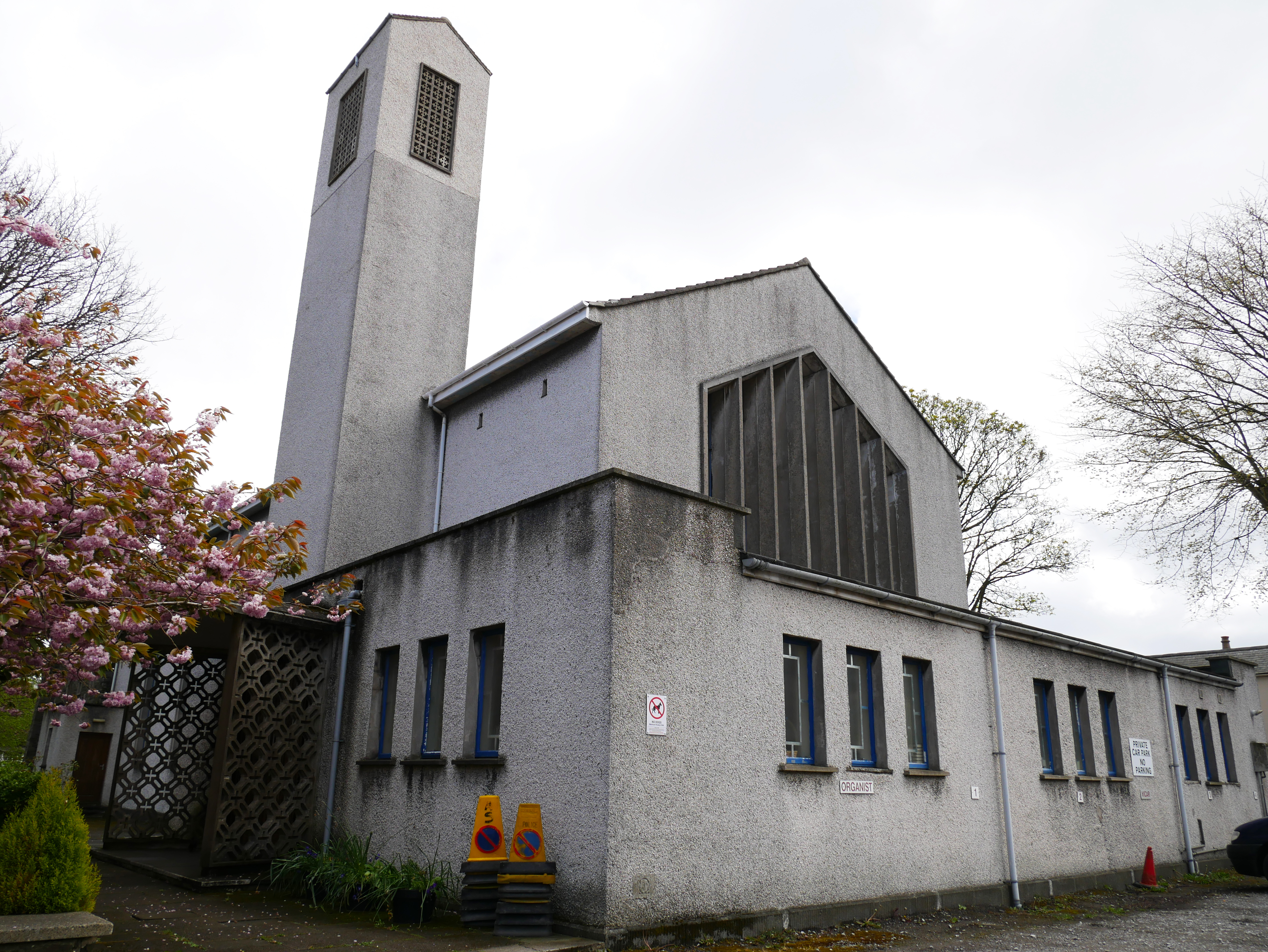
All Saints church, Douglas

All Saints Church, Douglas, Isle of Man, is a 1967 Modernist Anglican church which closed in May 2017.

The building was listed as a Registered Building of the Isle of Man in 2001.

== History ==
The first All Saints was consecrated in 1898. Known as the "Tin Tabernacle" due to its corrugated iron exterior, All Saints was established as a chapel of ease for the growing population of Douglas attached to St. George's Church. Although this structure was only initially expected to last a little over 15 years, it was not until 1965 that it was finally determined to be unfit for further use. After demolition of the "Tin Tab," the new All Saints was consecrated by the Bishop of Sodor and Man, Eric Gordon, on 20 April 1967. It was the first, and last, new Anglican church built on the Isle of Man for over 50 years.

== Architecture ==
The Modernist architecture of the building is a rarity in the Isle of Man. Designed by Claude Jennings Kneen for Davidson, Marsh & Co., the building was influenced by Auguste Perret's Église Notre-Dame du Raincy (1923) and Le Corbusier's Notre Dame du Haut at Ronchamp (1954). Noted distinctive features of All Saints include the curved concrete roof and pierced concrete block screen to the porch, which are uncommon in the Isle of Man. Notable from the interior of the building are the twelve 'Apostle' windows on north side of the sanctuary, made of thick glass from Gothenburg with each in a different colour; the East gable made from Pooil Vaaish black limestone; the font of grey-green Irish limestone decorated with a pattern found on the Cross of Gaut now housed in Kirk Michael; and the Rosso Francia altar which features birds carved into its side as one of the All Saints Building Committee was a keen amateur ornithologist. An architectural guide to the Isle of Man estimates the building as of importance:

All Saints is the Island's best and most intact Modernist building, although built well into the Late Modernist period when the early heroism was often replaced by cynicism.

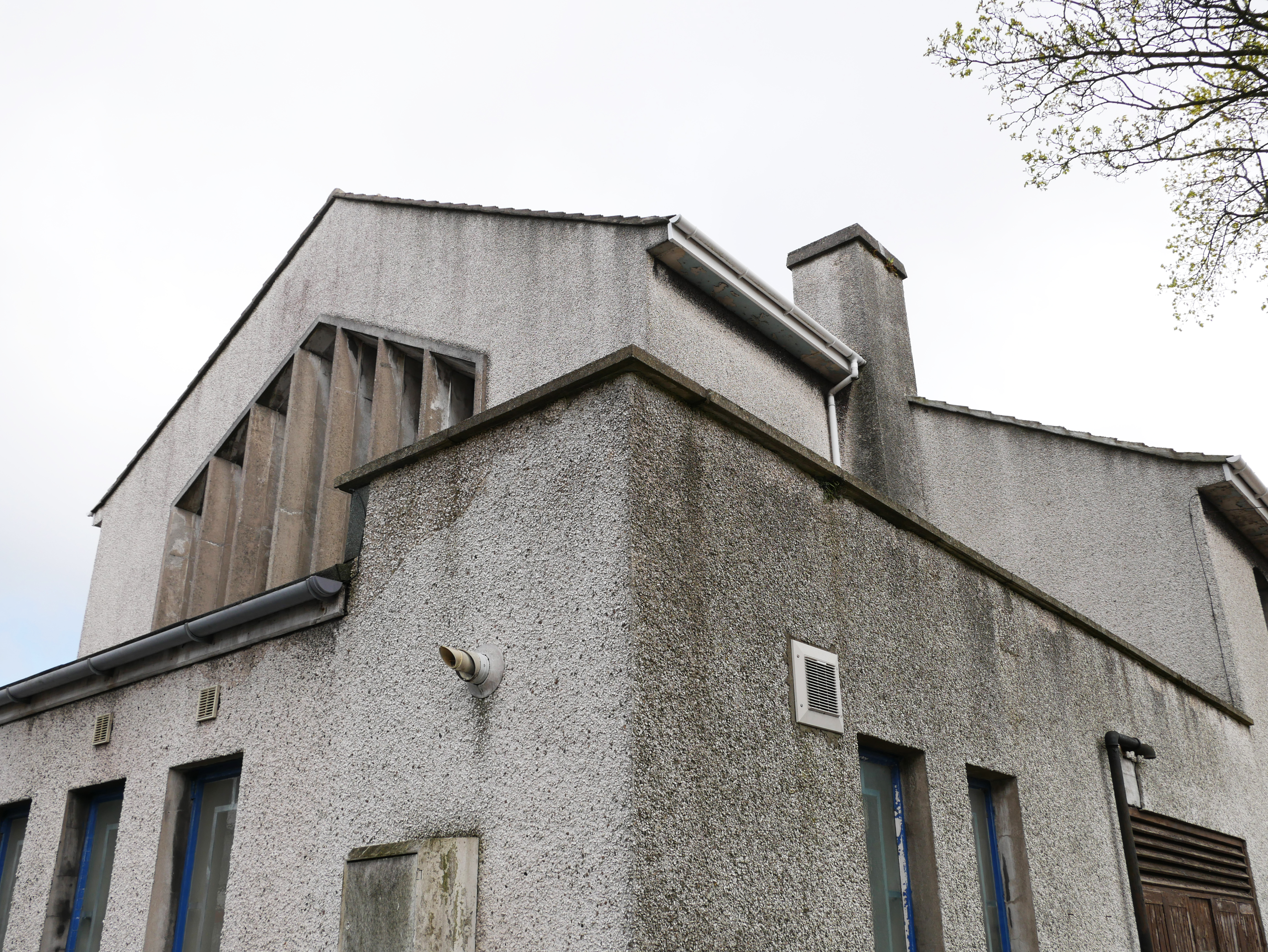
Exterior

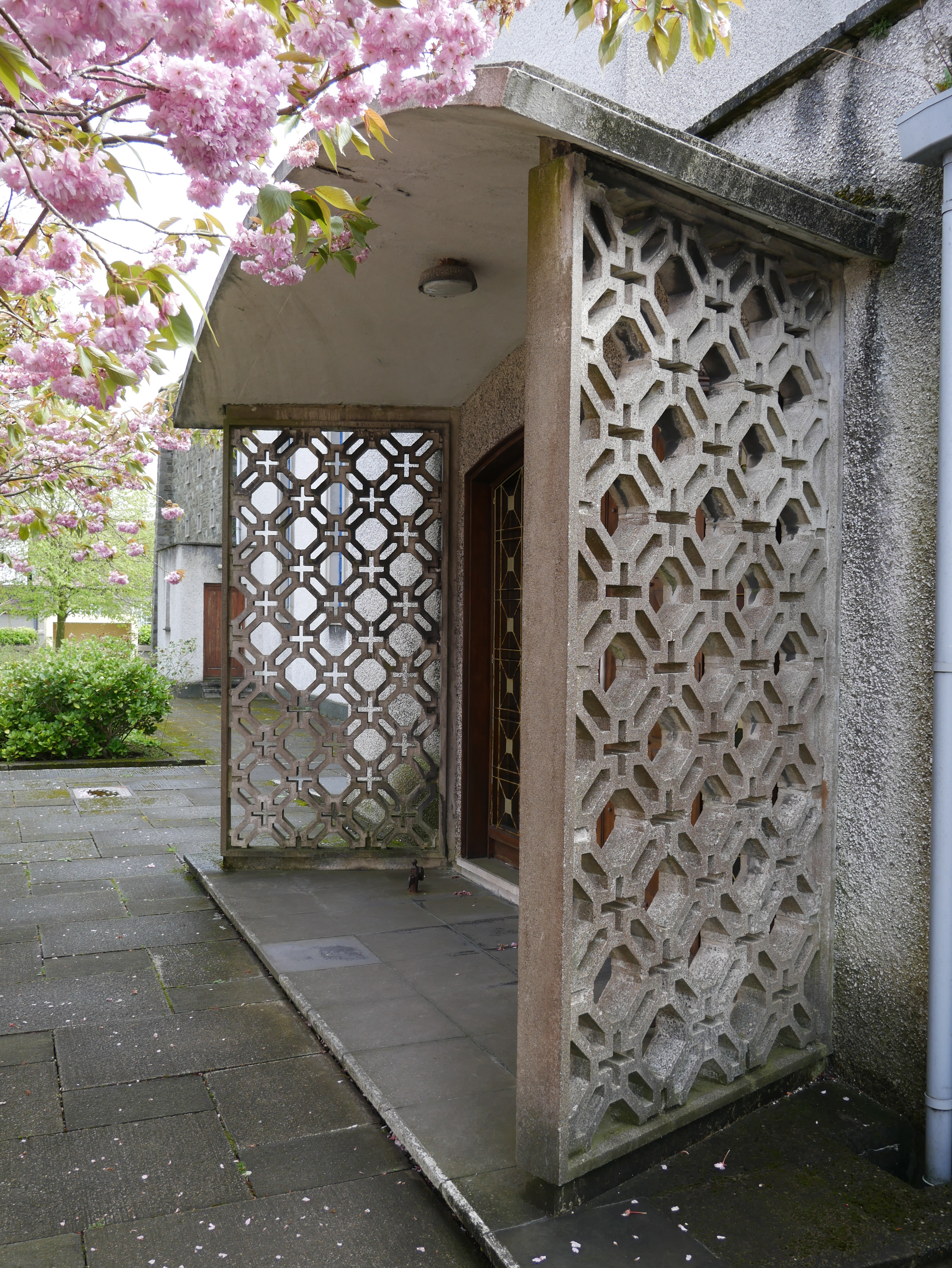
Pierced concrete block screen to the porch

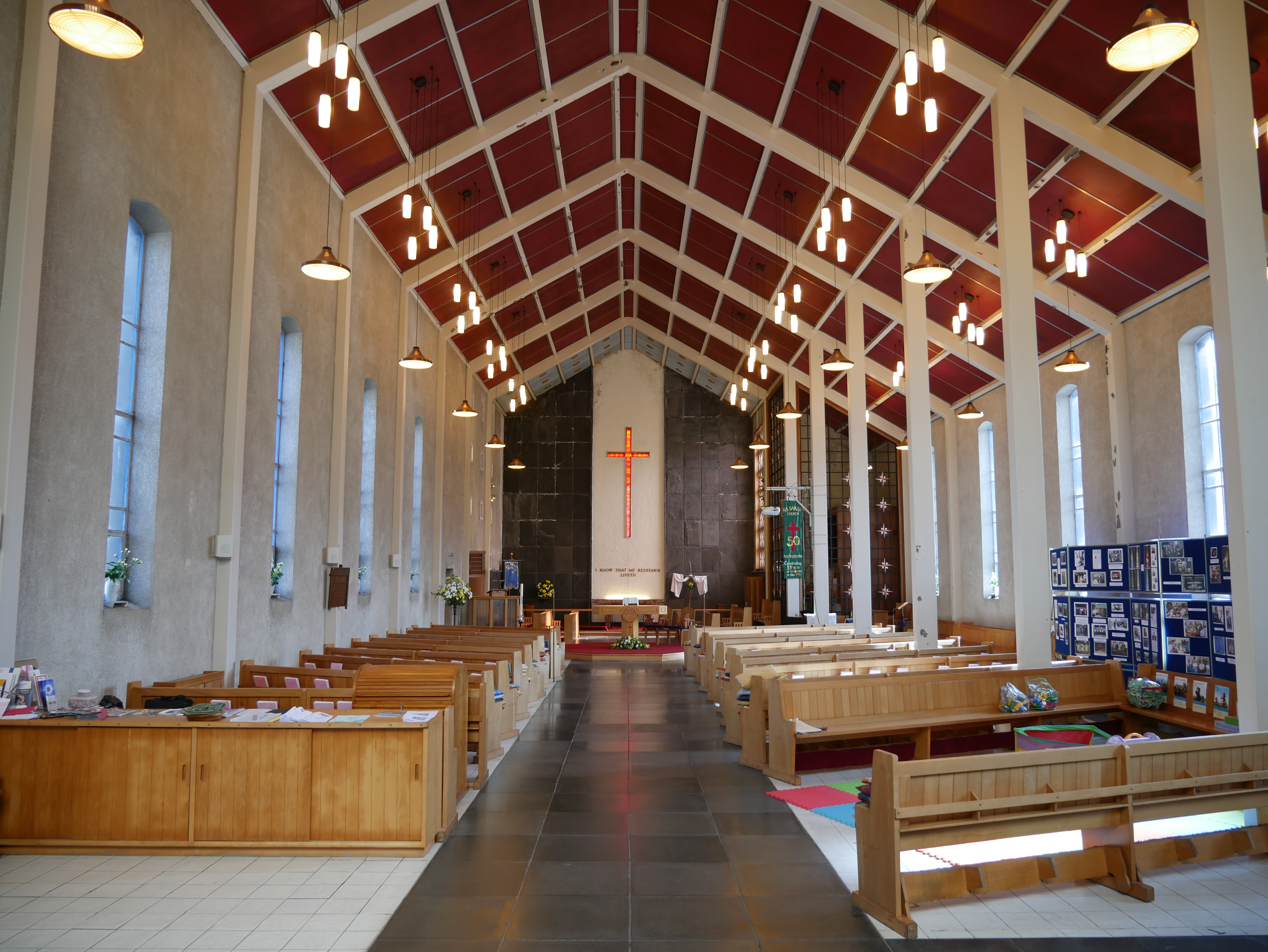
Interior

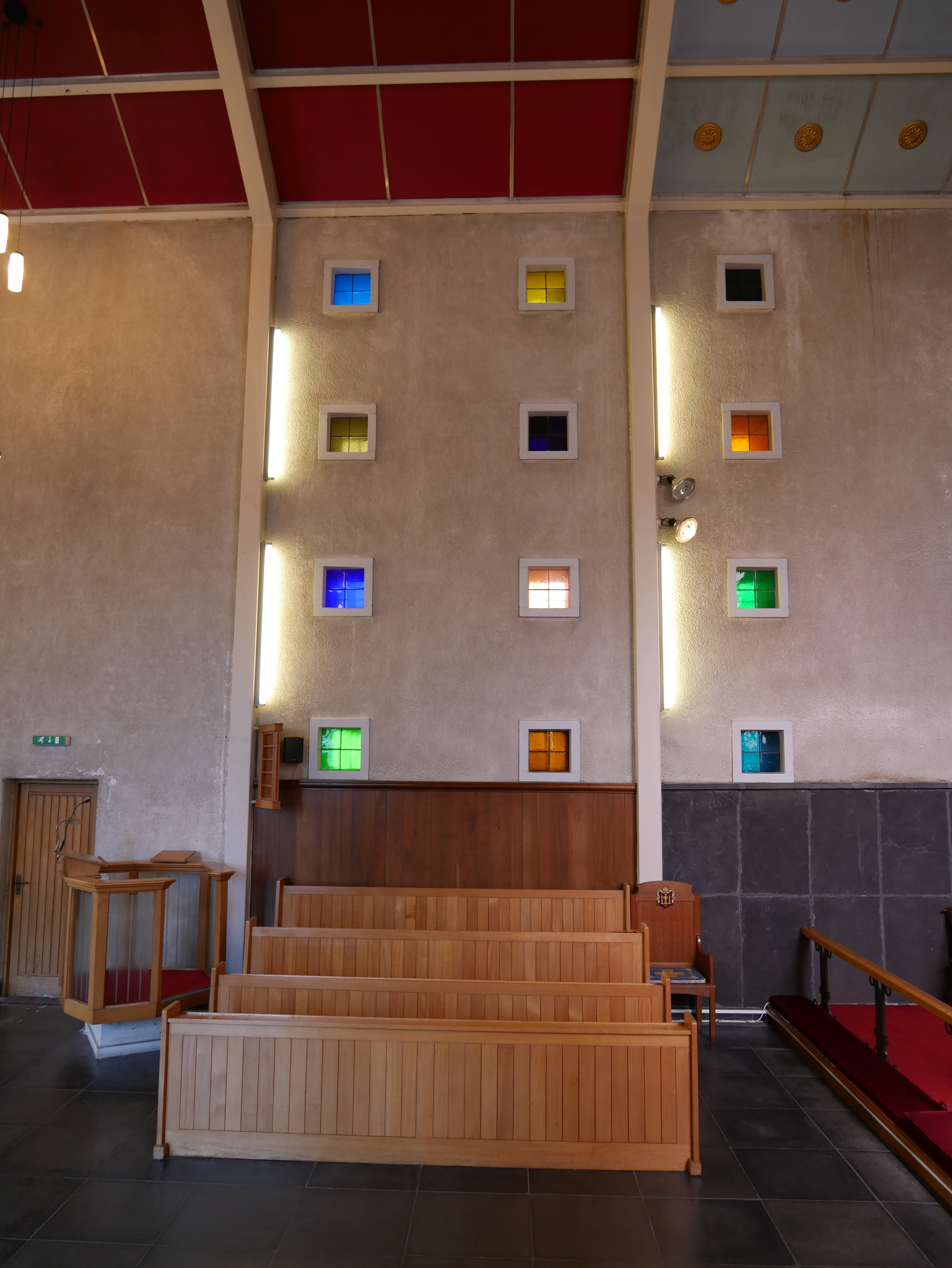
The twelve 'Apostle' windows of the sanctuary

== Closure ==
After leaks began to appear and the walls were found to be "wringing wet" with condensation, an architectural survey was commissioned. In 2016 the result was reported that the expected cost of the necessary repairs and refurbishment to the building would be in the region of at £400,000. The diocese deemed this to be ’unjustifiable’ in the contexts of the parish and the church on the Isle of Man, and so determined that the building should close. After the 50th anniversary of the building's consecration on 23 April 2017 and the final Parish Communion on 30 April, worship in the parish moved entirely to St George’s church, and All Saints finally closed its doors on 1 May 2017.

The church was documented in photography and film by Culture Vannin on 27 April 2017, days before its closure.

The building was converted into a fitness gym which is due to open in early 2026.
