= Langness Peninsula =

Coordinates: 54°03′45″N 4°37′15″W

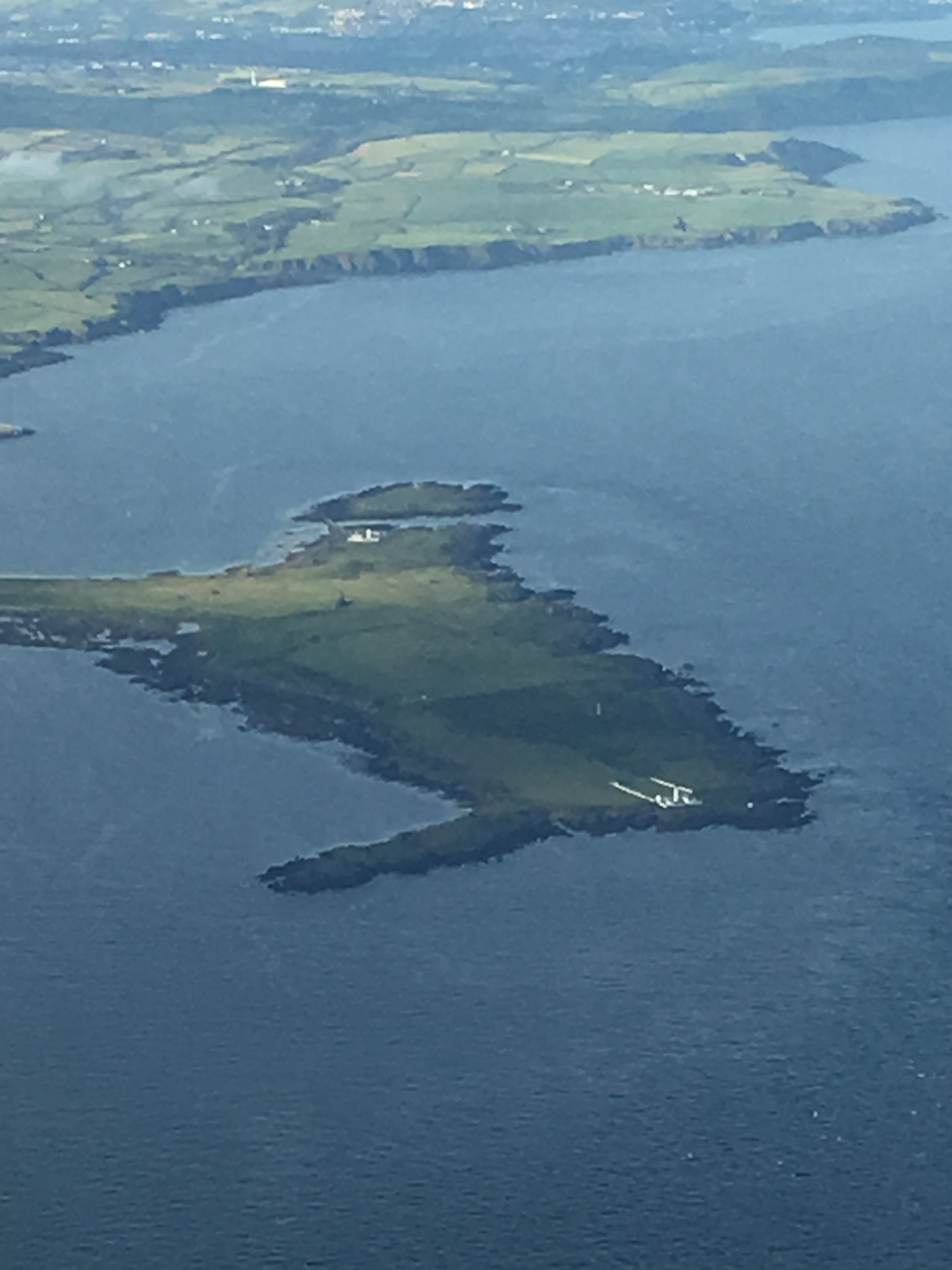
- Langness Peninsula and St Michael's Isle

- Location within the Isle of Man
- Crown dependency: Isle of Man

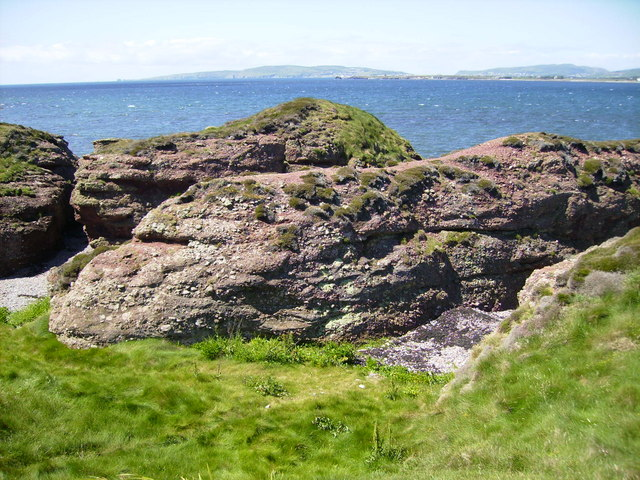
Coastal erosion on Langness Peninsula

Langness (Manx: Langlish) is a peninsula which protrudes two kilometres at the southern extremity of the Isle of Man. Signifying a cape or extended promontory, Langness literally means "long promontory" in Old Norse. Formerly an island, Langness was eventually joined to the mainland by the movement and deposition of material along Castletown Bay to form a tombolo. The small community of Derbyhaven is situated on the east coast of this isthmus, which lies close to Castletown, Isle of Man.

== History ==
The old Manx name for Langness was Oaie Ny Baatyn Marroo, which translates as the "Grave yard of the Lost Ships". Before Langness Lighthouse was built on Dreswick Point in 1880, wrecks on the peninsula were common. During periods of low visibility the only foghorn was a cow's horn which would be blown by a party of men on the shore – the sound of which carried for half a mile at best.

=== The Potato Grave ===
Near the lighthouse is a turf-covered mound, known as the potato grave. In 1832 a ship carrying Irish workers to the Isle of Man to dig potatoes was lost with all hands, and 32 bodies were washed ashore. It was customary on the island to bury a body washed ashore behind a hedge in the place it had been found, and so a communal grave was dug and all 32 bodies placed within it. No stone marks the grave; the only memorial of the victims is a turf-covered mound.

== Geography ==
The peninsula is close to Ronaldsway Airport, and a good view of the peninsula can be obtained from the port side of aircraft landing on the westerly facing runway. It is also within easy walking distance from Castletown, and the peninsula itself features an interesting nature trail. Coastal erosion has carved parts of the coast into sea arches, which are also of geological interest as they contain an unconformity: parts of the rocks are nearly 500 million years old, other parts are some 150 million years younger.

At the southern tip of the peninsula is Dreswick Point, the southernmost point of the Manx mainland, whilst St Michael's Isle (popularly known as Fort Island) is connected at the northern end of the peninsula by a narrow causeway.

A feature of the peninsula is the Herring Tower, a daymark built in 1811. Other structures to be found on the peninsula include the remains of a World War II-era gun training range, close to the lighthouse, and a memorial to local naturalist Henry Madoc, who was also the island's Chief Constable.

== Natural history ==
The peninsula is a popular haunt of birdwatchers, and has bird life ranging from golden plovers and curlews to merlins and kestrels. St. Michael's Island is a bird sanctuary.

Dolphins and porpoises can also occasionally seen in the waters off the peninsula.

== Leisure ==
The Castletown Golf & Country Club (formerly also a hotel, closed since 2007) is set on the peninsula and the isthmus connecting it with Derbyhaven and has been the scene of many international championships. In 2005, the Duke of York Young Champions Trophy golf championships were held at the club.

== See also ==
- List of peninsulas
