= Old House of Keys =

Former meeting place of the lower house of Tynwald

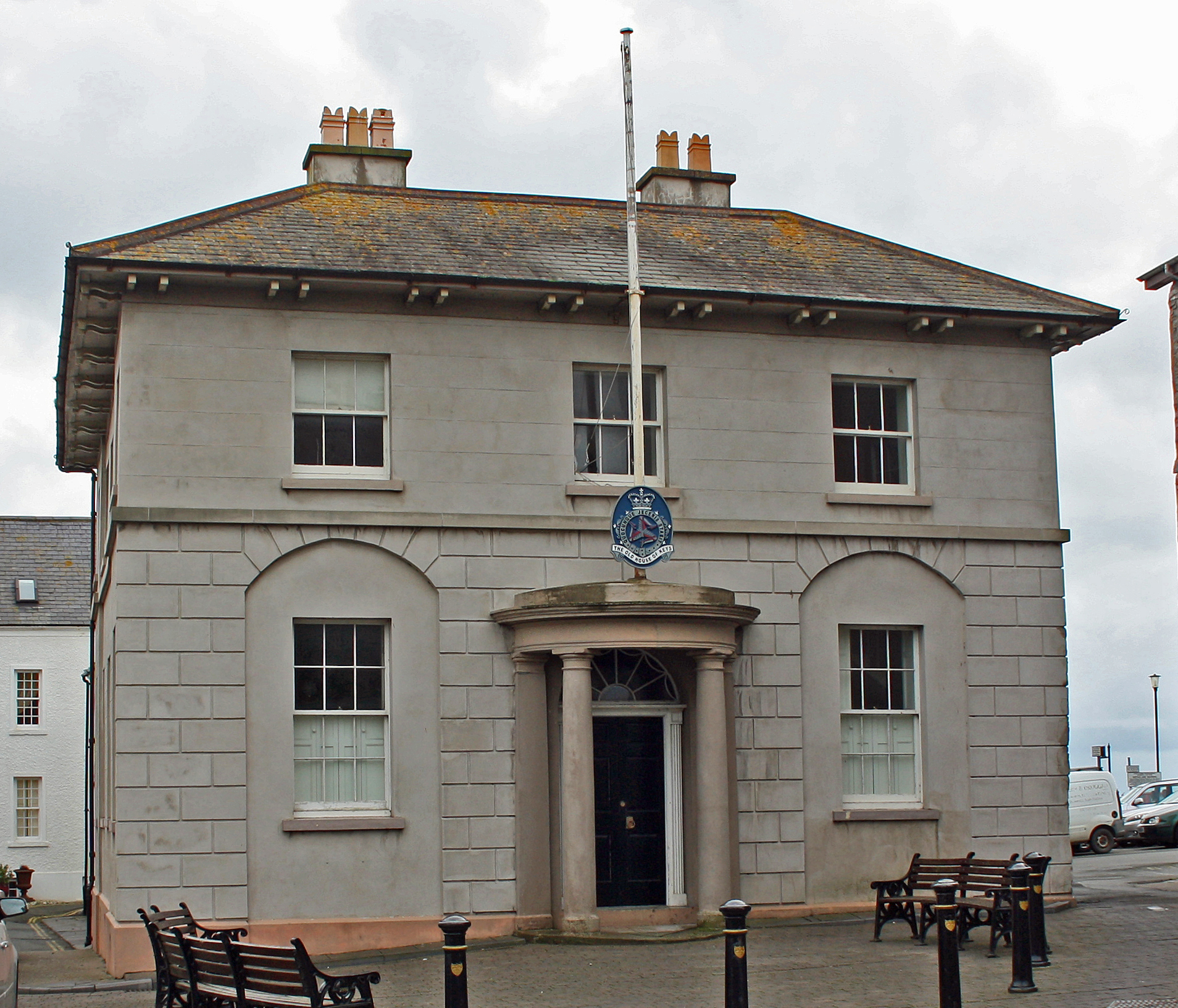
- Facade of the Old House of Keys

- Location with the Isle of Man

General information
- Location: Castletown, Isle of Man
- Coordinates: 54°4′24.2″N 4°39′7.5″W
- Current tenants: Manx National Heritage (museum)
- Construction started: 31 May 1819
- Completed: January 1821
- Cost: £1039-10-0d
- Client: Duke of Atholl
- Owner: House of Keys

Design and construction
- Architect: Thomas Brine

Website
- Official website

The Old House of Keys (Manx: Shenn-thie y Chiare as Feed) is the former meeting place of the House of Keys, the lower house of Tynwald, the Isle of Man's parliament. It is located across the street from Castle Rushen in Castletown, the former capital of the Isle of Man, in the south of the island. The building was used as the House of Keys from 1821 until 1874, when the parliament was moved to Douglas.

Prior to 1821, the House of Keys had no official home, but met first at Castle Rushen, and later at the Bishop of Sodor and Man's library in Castletown. After criticism from a Royal Commission, plans were drawn up for a new meeting house for the Keys in 1813, but after concerns about the cost, they were redrawn and approved in 1819. The building, designed by Thomas Brine, was completed in 1821. It housed the House of Keys until 1874, when the Keys followed the other primary functions of the island and moved to Douglas. After their move, the Old House became a branch of Dumbell's Bank, and later Parr's Bank. In 2000, Manx National Heritage acquired the building and began restoring the house to how it appeared in 1866. The building opened to the public as a museum in November 2001.

== Background ==
The parliament of the Isle of Man—Tynwald—is the oldest currently running parliament in the world. It is generally considered to have its origins in the 10th century, but could date back as far as the 8th century. Originally a 32-member Tynwald ruled over the Kingdom of the Isles, with half of its representatives coming from the Isle of Man. In the 12th century, this dropped to a 24-member Tynwald when the islands of Mull and Islay were lost to Argyll. By the 16th century, Tynwald consisted of an upper and a lower house; the lower house was known as the 24 Keys. At that time, the members met irregularly at Castle Rushen, when called upon by either the Lord of Mann or one of his Deemsters to help with legal and taxation issues. The Keys continued to meet at Castle Rushen until 1710, when they moved to Thomas Wilson's (the Bishop of Sodor and Man) library in Castletown. Late in the 18th century they still met in the library, of which a Royal Commission reported that "...the Keys assemble in a mean decayed building little more than sufficient to contain the number which they consist."

== History ==
=== Construction ===
Over twenty years after the Royal Commission's damning report on the state of the library in which the Keys met, the 4th Duke of Atholl, the Governor of the Isle of Man, instructed Thomas Brine, the Clerk of Works for public buildings, to cost and draw up plans for a new House of Keys. These plans were rejected by the British Home Department and Treasury as too expensive, and despite repeated demands for a new meeting place, the proposal was put on hold. Brine carried out a survey of the library in 1817 at the request of the Keys, and condemned the building, resulting in the meetings of the Keys being held in a public house, The George Inn. Despite the comfort afforded by the building, it was criticised as being "...highly improper for any Court of Justice and particularly so, for one of such importance in this Island as the House of Keys", as recorded in the Journal of the Keys in October 1817.

Another design was requested of Brine, but this time for a smaller and less expensive building. In 1818, the Keys purchased the building in which they had formerly met, moving the library to the Grammar School. The new plans were agreed upon by all concerned, but there continued to be disagreements between the British Treasury department and the Keys over how to fund the project. The Treasury believed that the cost should be covered by Manx taxes, but the Keys argued that this tax would be excessive. The two parties eventually each agreed to pay some of the £1039-10-0d cost, and the project was approved on 31 May 1819, just under 30 years after the first discussions. The building was completed in less than two years, and the Keys started using the building in January 1821.

=== Operation ===
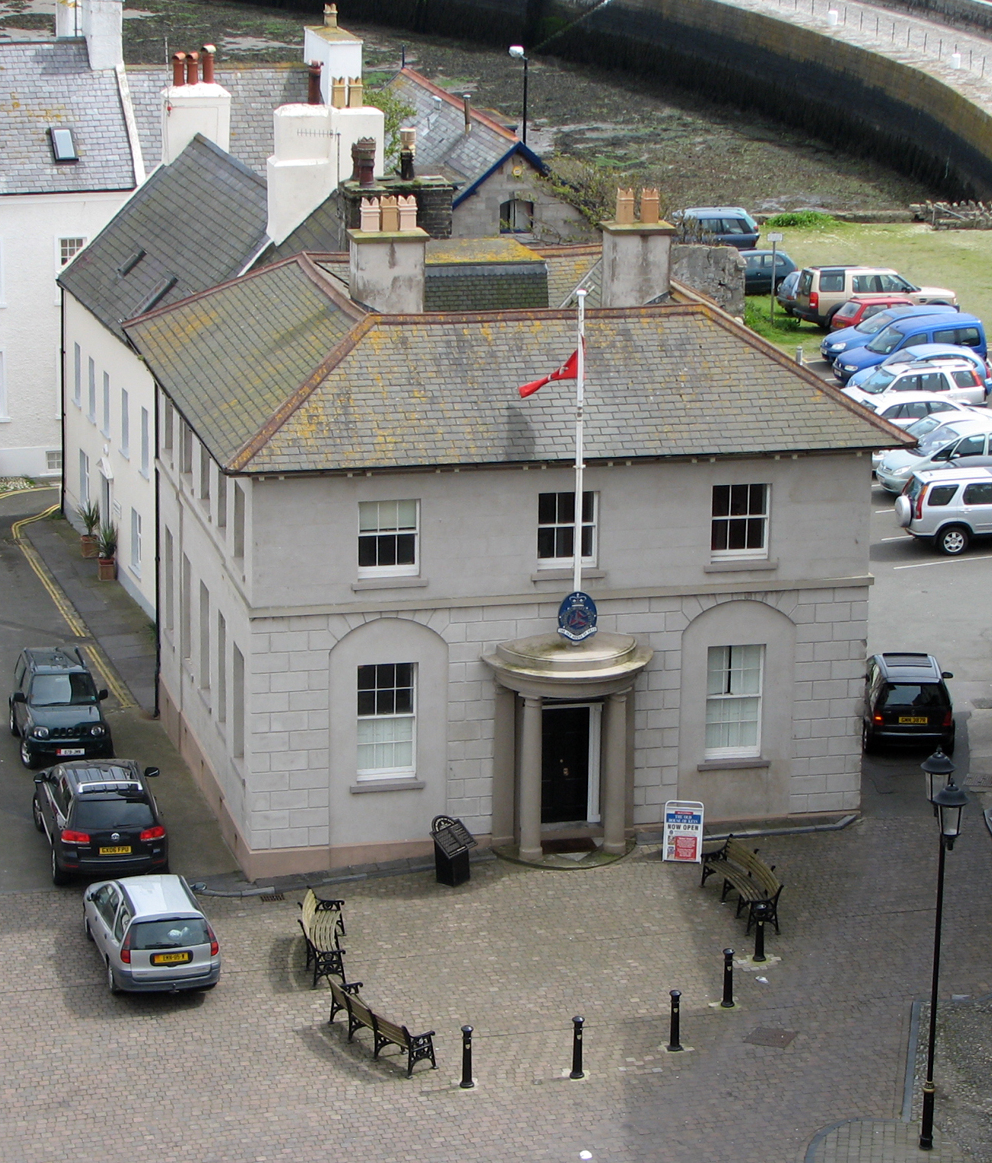
Aerial view

Within a year of its completion, the House of Keys was heavily criticised in a letter to the Rising Sun newspaper. The external appearance of the building was described as bland and "more like that of a small country villa, or village jail, than a Senate House." The interior was similarly lambasted, with particular attention being paid to the small space provided for the Speaker's chair. During the Keys' time in the building, they underwent one of their most significant changes. Until 1866, the Keys were a self-elected body, but following pressure from the public, most notably Isle of Man Times editor James Brown, the House agreed to be elected by popular vote. During the 1860s, Douglas became more prominent; the Lieutenant Governor moved his residence there in 1861, the Law Courts moved the following year, and by 1869 Douglas had replaced Castletown as the capital of the island. The House of Keys building in Castletown was described as too small, and "dilapidated with the wallpaper hanging off the wall." In 1874, the House of Keys moved to the Court House in Douglas, and five years later, into their current home, the Old Bank of Mona building also in Douglas.

=== Later use ===
After being vacated by the Keys, the building was purchased by Dumbell's Bank. Not long after acquiring the building, the bank removed the ceiling from the chamber, and added a large skylight to create a grand banking hall. The building was repainted in an expensive shade of blue which was fashionable at the time. In 1900, when Dumbell's Bank collapsed, the building was taken over by Parr's Bank. The render was stripped off the outside of the building sometime during the 1910s or 1920s, revealing the limestone underneath. In 1918, the bank became part of Westminster Bank. In the 1960s, the upper floor of the chamber was replaced. The building was presented to the Castletown Commissioners in 1973 by the National Westminster Bank on the condition that it serve the town. It was used as the Town Hall until the opening of the Town Hall and Civic Centre in 1989, and then as the Castletown Rural Library.

Manx National Heritage undertook the renovation of the building in 2000 and now runs it as a museum. The building has been restored to its appearance in 1866. That year was chosen as it was when the "House of Keys Election Bill" was passed, making the House of Keys a popularly elected body. In the absence of images depicting the interior, written descriptions were used, in conjunction with inventories.
