= Herring Tower, Langness =

Coordinates: 54.0587°N 4.6216°W

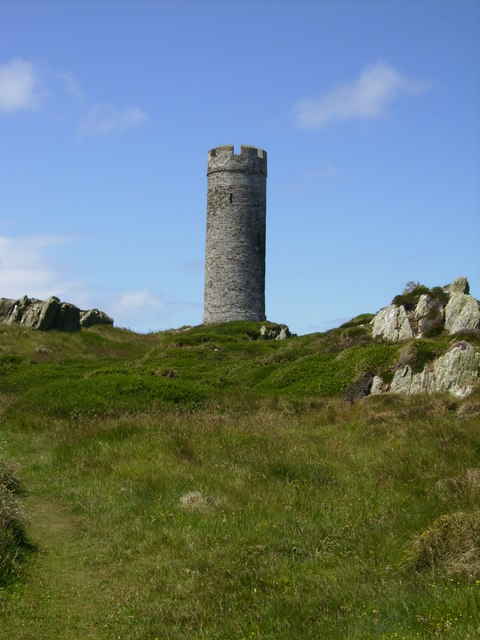
The Herring Tower, Langness

The Herring Tower is situated on the Langness Peninsula in the south of the Isle of Man. It was built by Thomas Brine in 1811. The tower was built as a daymark and was based on the style of the tower of Peel Castle. Since 1991 Herring Tower has been protected as a registered building.

== History ==
In 1811, architect Thomas Brine was commissioned by the British Government to construct two daymarks on the Isle of Man to assist cargo ships in navigating safely around the island's coast. Twelve years later in April 1823, Brine placed an advertisement in the Manx Advertiser for masons and other workers to work on a stone beacon in Derbyhaven, which may have been Herring Tower. Another identical daymark was also built in Douglas Head, which now forms part of the Douglas Head Hotel.

During the herring fishing season, a fire would be displayed in the tower to guide ships into Derbyhaven. But the tower failed to prevent many shipwrecks, with forty being recorded after the tower was constructed. However, calls for a lit lighthouse to be built nearby were rejected until 1877. Langness Lighthouse was built three years later in 1880.

A meeting of the Isle of Man Planning Committee of the Department of Local Government and the Environment on 21 June 1991 decided to protect Herring Tower as a registered building. The tower was publicly declared a registered building on 1 August 1991.

== Architecture ==
Herring Tower's design was heavily inspired by the round tower of Peel Castle.
