= Windmills in the Isle of Man =

The Isle of Man has had a number of windmills over the centuries. They were mostly threshing mills, with a few corn mills.

== Ballawhane, Andreas ==
NX 398 012 54°22′52″N 4°28′05″W

This small mill at Andreas was a threshing mill built c.1870. It was derelict in 1952. In 2007, it was proposed to add the mill to the Isle of Man's Protected Buildings Register.

== Mullen Guiye, Andreas ==
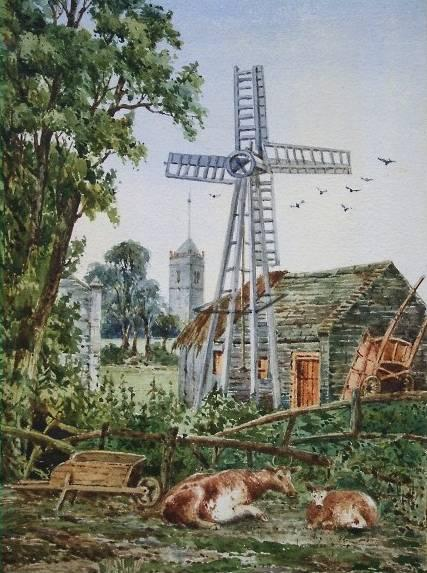
Mullen Guiye

A skeletal mill was painted by J Coleman in 1899. The mill had four shuttered sails and there was a drive through the centre of the mill and then into a barn. It is probably Mullen Guiye, which was a small threshing mill. The mill was still in existence in 1902.

== Ballacorage, Ballaugh ==
SC 348 956 54°19′44″N 4°32′31″W

This small mill at Ballaugh was a threshing mill on a farm, built in 1878. It is 2.35 metres (7 ft 9 in) in diameter at the base and was house converted between 1967 and 1972.

== Castletown ==
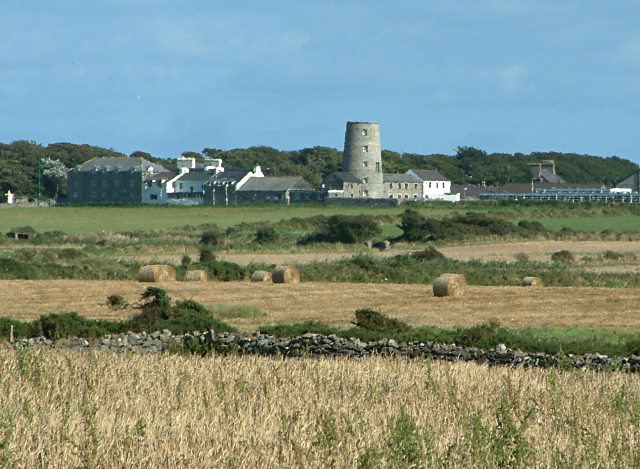
Castletown

SC 259 677 54°04′34″N 4°39′47″W

The five storey tower mill at Castletown was built in 1828. The mill drove four pairs of millstones and there was a threshing mill in one of the barns attached to the mill. It was tailwinded and lost its sails shortly after completion in 1828. In August 1829, the mill was tailwinded and the sails were damaged. It was destroyed by fire on 6 January 1850. It was a ruin by 1874. The mill was used as a museum of witchcraft from 1951 to the 1960s, thus gaining its local name of The Witches Mill. It was house converted in the 1990s, with a glass roof being built within the tower.

A Titt iron wind engine was erected at Castletown in May 1892, replacing a steam engine.

== Ballamoar, Jurby ==
The mill at Jurby was mentioned in the will of Captain Thomas Christian in 1725.

== Baldromma, Maughold ==
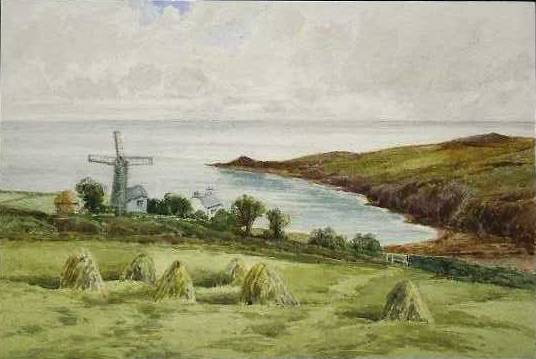
Maughold

SC 490 913 54°17′42″N 4°19′19″W

The small tower threshing mill at Maughold was built c.1881. It had four common sails which rotated in a clockwise direction. The mill had no cap and there was a stage at first floor level. The mill had sails on in 1909 but these had gone by 1949. The tower has been incorporated into a modern house.

== Billown Quarry, Malew ==
SC 269 702 54°05′53″N 4°38′56″W

This was a large iron windpump.

== South Barrule, Malew ==
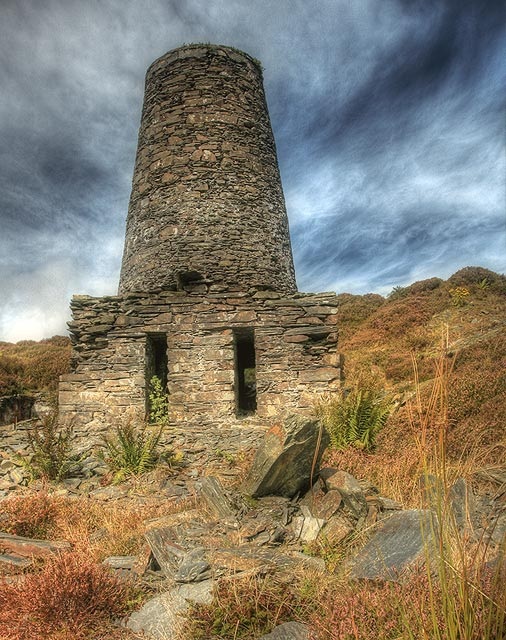
South Barrule

SC 270 768 54°09′29″N 4°39′04″W

This small tower mill was built c.1902 to work an incline on a 2 ft (610 mm) gauge railway serving the slate quarry on South Barrule, Malew. The tower survives.

== The Rhyne, Marown ==
The small threshing mill at Marown was built c.1860. Legend states that stones from a keeill were used in the construction of the mill, and that when set in motion the mill went so fast that it shook the premises, and had to be taken down as a consequence.

== Bootleyvelt, Maughold ==
The mill at Bootleyvelt, Maughold, was apparently built in a tall tree. It was used for chopping gorse.

== Michael ==
SC 318 907 54°17′02″N 4°35′06″W

The mill at Michael may have been a saw or threshing mill. A five sailed mill reputedly burnt down in 1865 and was replaced by a four sailed mill.

== Ballakermeen, Onchan ==
The mill at Ballakermeen, Onchan was a scutching and corn mill. Permission for it to be built was granted in 1755. It was in existence in the 1780s but had gone by 1790.

== Ballaquane, Peel ==
A windmill was recorded at Peel in 1608, but had gone by 1648. Another windmill was built in 1841 and burnt down on 17 December 1847.

== Lezayre Mill, Ramsey ==
SC 445 952 54°19′44″N 4°23′35″W

The tower mill at Ramsey was a combined corn and saw mill. It was built by John Monk and completed on 29 August 1836. A steam engine was added as auxiliary power in 1862. It is thought that the windmill ceased to work by the end of the 1870s. The tower was 35 feet (10.67 m) diameter at the base and 64 feet (19.51 m) high The six storey tower was reduced to a two-storey base in the 1960s and the mill is now a house conversion.

== See also ==
- Registered Buildings of the Isle of Man

== Books ==
Kelly, Nick (1995). Manx Windmills: A contemporary Survey, 1993. Mills Research Group. ISBN 0-9509758-7-7.
