= Langton Dennis =

English architect

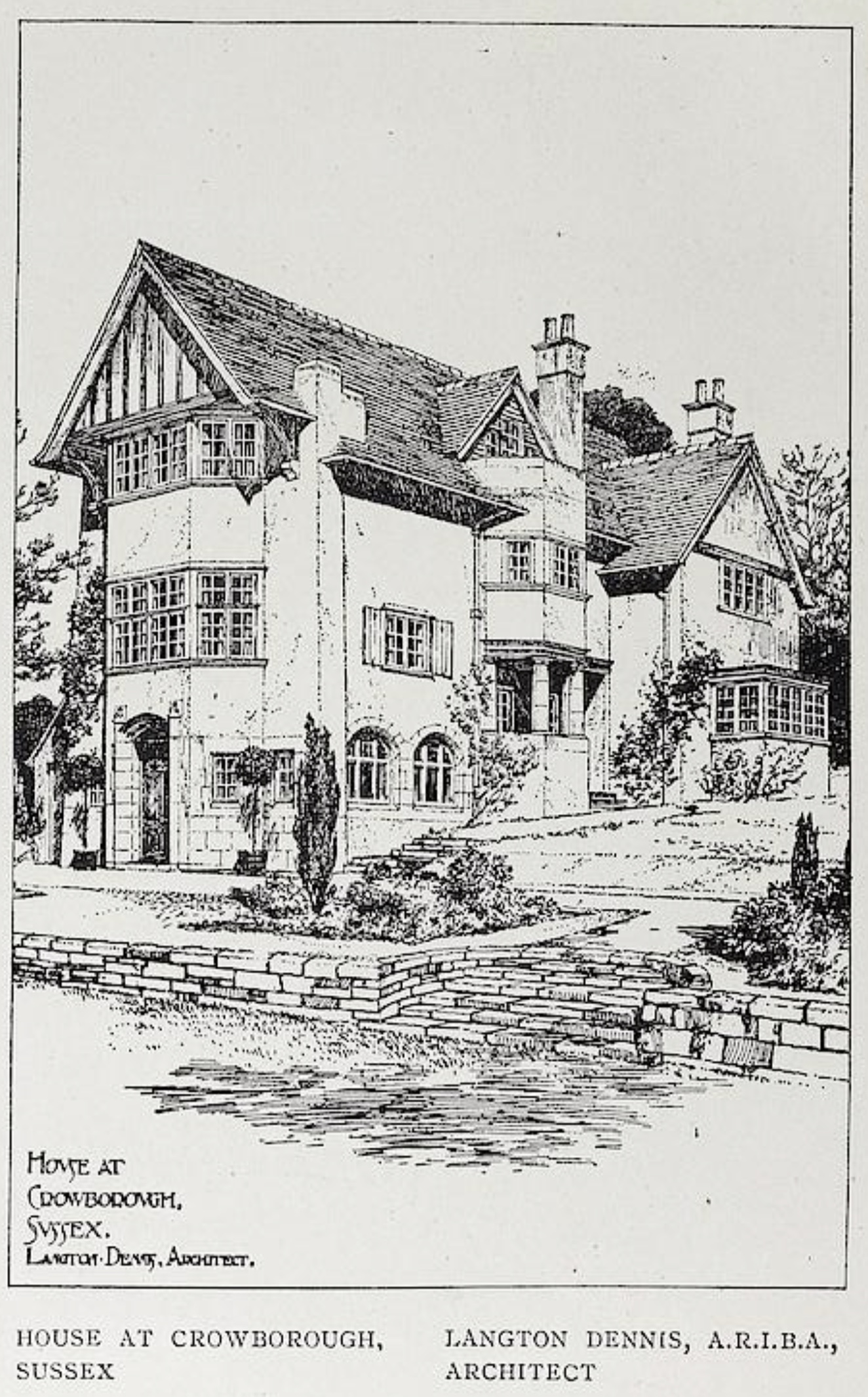
Forest House, Crowborough 1903

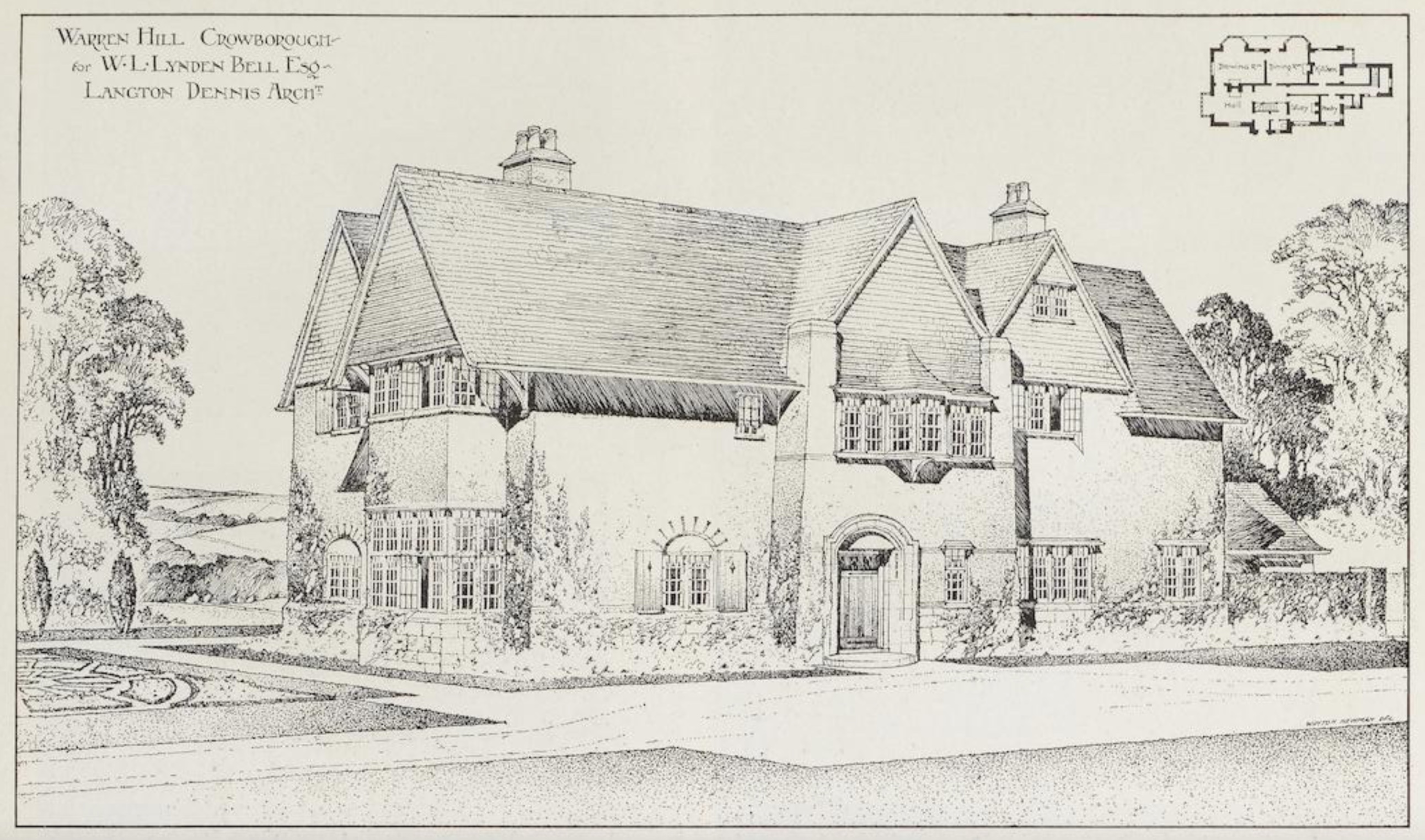
Warren Hill, Crowborough 1907

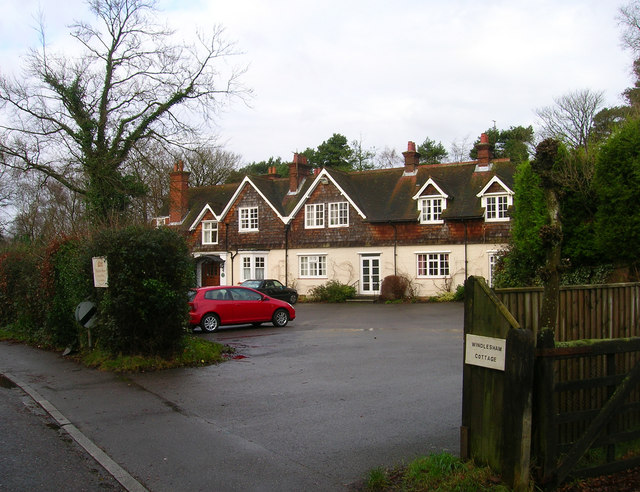
Windlesham Manor, home of Sir Arthur Conan Doyle, 1907

Langton Dennis ARIBA (11 January 1865 – 10 March 1945) was an architect based in England who is best known for his domestic houses in the Arts and Crafts style in Crowborough, Sussex.

== Architectural career ==
He was articled to Ernest George and Harold Peto from 1882 to 1886. He was assistant to Thomas Edward Collcutt from 1887 to 1888 and afterwards assistant to Frederick George Knight.

He was appointed as Associate of the Royal Institute of British Architects in 1889 but he resigned from this in 1927.

== Personal life ==
He was born on 11 January 1865 in Streatham, the son of John Dennis and Ellen. He was baptised on 8 February 1865 at Immanuel Church, Streatham.

He married Dora Gertrude Phillips on 3 August 1899 at St John's Church, Withyham, (now St John's Church, Crowborough). She became a noted breeder of Pomeranian dogs. They had children as follows:

- Lois Margaret Dennis (b.15 May 1900)
- Salusbury Langton Dennis (6 September 1907 - 15 January 2005)

He died on 10 March 1943 at Crowborough Sussex.

== Works ==
- Court House, Peel, Isle of Man, 1892-93 (now Peel Police Station)
- Forest House, Aviemore Road, Crowborough 1903
- Offley, Poundgate, Crowborough 1905 (his own house)
- Warren Hill, Crowborough 1907
- Windlesham, Crowborough ca. 1908 (for Sir Arthur Conan Doyle)
- Crowborough Cottage Hospital 1924 (additions and alterations) (with Captain Richard C Ball as Dennis and Ball)
- St John's Church, Withyham (now St John's Church, Crowborough) 1930 (renovation) (with Captain Richard C Ball as Dennis and Ball)
