= Thomas Brine =

Scottish architect

Thomas Brine was a Scottish architect who worked on several projects in the Isle of Man in the 19th century.

His works included the Old House of Keys, the Herring Tower in Langness, The Courthouse in Kirk Michael and St Paul's, Ramsey.
