= Dreswick Point =

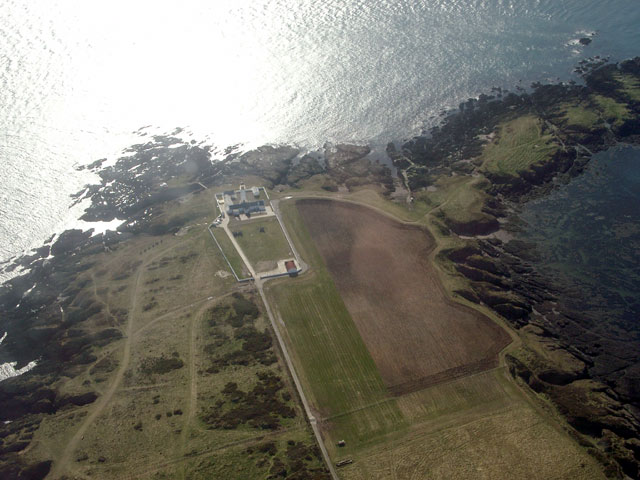
- Aerial view of the point and lighthouse

- Location within the Isle of Man
- Crown dependency: Isle of Man

Dreswick Point is the southernmost point of the main island of the Isle of Man. It is the southern tip of the Langness Peninsula in the south-east of the island, some 2 1/2 miles (4.0 km) from Castletown.

== Langness Lighthouse ==
Langness Lighthouse
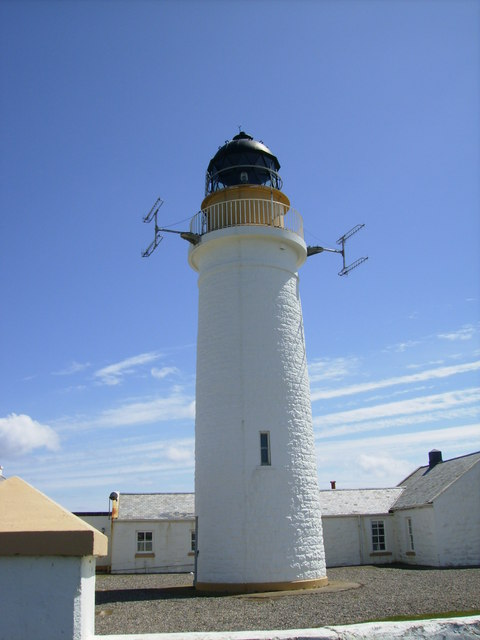
- Langness Lighthouse in 2007
- Location: Dreswick Point, Langness Peninsula; Isle of Man
- Coordinates: 54.054878°N 4.625078°W

Tower
- Constructed: 1880
- Construction: Masonry tower
- Automated: 1996
- Height: 19 metres (62 ft)
- Shape: Cylindrical tower with balcony and lantern
- Markings: White tower, black lantern
- Operator: Langness Lighthouse Cottage
- Heritage: registered building

Light
- Focal height: 23 metres (75 ft)
- Lens: Twin 300 mm lenses
- Range: 12 nmi (22 km; 14 mi)
- Characteristic: Fl (2) W 30s.

Langness Lighthouse was established in 1880 to guide boats into Castletown. The lighthouse keeper's cottages were formerly owned by TV car journalist Jeremy Clarkson, who featured the lighthouse in an episode of Top Gear (series 07, Episode 1). Before this time, a landmark known as the Herring Tower held a lighted flare to guide fishing boats. The lighthouse is a Registered Building.

=== The Potato Grave ===
Near the lighthouse is a turf covered mound, known as the potato grave. In 1832 a ship carrying Irish workers to the Isle of Man to help with the digging of potatoes was lost with all hands and over the intervening days the bodies of those who perished were washed ashore. At this time on the Isle of Man it was customary bury the bodies of people washed ashore behind a hedge in the place it had been found, and so a communal grave was dug and all 32 bodies placed within it.

No stone marks the resting place of these souls, their only memorial is a turf covered mound.

== See also ==
- List of lighthouses in the Isle of Man
