= Civil defense by country =

Non-military engineering services

Many countries around the world have civil defense organizations dedicated to protecting civilians from military attacks and providing rescue services after widespread disasters. In most countries, civil defense is a government-managed and often volunteer-staffed organization.

Towards the end of the Cold War, a number of civil defense organizations have been disbanded or mothballed (as in the case of the Royal Observer Corps in the United Kingdom and the United States civil defense), while others have changed their focuses into providing rescue services after natural disasters (as for the State Emergency Service in Australia).

== Africa ==
=== Algeria ===
Algerian Civil Defence is a unit of the Algerian government responsible for firefighting, rescue services, and emergency response.

=== Egypt ===
The Egyptian General Administration of Civil Defense "is a department of Ministry of Interior (Egypt), founded in 1875. Its main task is to respond and to protect civilians and animals in case of emergency or natural disasters".

=== Nigeria ===
The Nigeria Security and Civil Defence Corps "is a para-military agency of the Government of the Federal Republic of Nigeria that is commissioned in 2003, to provide measures against threat and any form of attack or disaster against the nation and its citizenry".

== Americas ==
=== Brazil ===
States and some cities have their own civil defense measures, overseen by the Ministry of Regional Development.

=== Canada ===
Canada's civil defense measures evolved over time. As with many other matters in Canada, responsibility is shared between the federal and provincial government. The first post-WWII civil defence co-ordinator was appointed in October 1948 "to supervise the work of federal, provincial and municipal authorities in planning for public air-raid shelters, emergency food and medical supplies, and the evacuation of likely target areas".

In 1959, the Government of Canada, under John Diefenbaker handed authority for civilian defense to the Emergency Measures Organisation (EMO). Large fallout shelters, known as "Diefenbunkers" were built at rural locations outside major cities across Canada at the height of the Cold War during the infancy of the ICBM threat.

The EMO then became Emergency Planning Canada in 1974, then Emergency Preparedness Canada in 1986. In February 2001, the Government replaced Emergency Preparedness with the Office of Critical Infrastructure Protection and Emergency Preparedness (OCIPEP), responsible for civilian emergency planning in both peace and war.

Among the "Core Missions" of the Canada First Defence Strategy (under the Canadian Department of National Defence) are to respond to terrorist attacks and other crises such as natural disasters. According to the Emergency Management Act, the Minister of Public Safety and Emergency Preparedness is responsible for exercising leadership relating to emergency management in Canada by coordinating, among government institutions and in cooperation with the provinces and other entities, emergency management activities.

=== Caribbean ===
Anguilla, Antigua and Barbuda, the Bahamas, Barbados, Belize, the British Virgin Islands, Dominica, Grenada, Guyana, Haiti, Jamaica, Montserrat, Saint Kitts and Nevis, Saint Lucia, Saint Vincent and the Grenadines, Suriname, Trinidad and Tobago, and the Turks and Caicos Islands, are members of the Caribbean Disaster Emergency Management Agency, which organizes relief efforts after widespread disasters. Antigua and Barbuda, Barbados, Dominica, Grenada, Saint Kitts and Nevis, St. Lucia, and St. Vincent and the Grenadines are also members of the Regional Security System, which may also provide assistance during national emergencies.

=== Panama ===
The Panama Civil Defense Seismic Network has the capability of informing and warning citizens of hazardous conditions such as earthquakes, volcanoes, or tsunami.

=== United States ===
The Office of Civilian Defense was set up May 20, 1941, by Executive Order 8757, to co-ordinate state and federal measures for protection of civilians in case of war emergency. The Federal Civil Defense Administration (FCDA) was organized on December 1, 1950, and distributed civil defense information until it was merged with FEMA in 1979. Between 1979 and 2001, the duties of Civil Defense were served by the Federal Emergency Management Agency (FEMA). FEMA was absorbed into the Department of Homeland Security in 2003.

== Asia ==
=== China ===
China continues to construct large public emergency shelters. Not less than three large (maximum capacity of around 8000) shelters are to be completed in the Shanghai area by 2012, with more planned. The ironic completion date of late 2012 has been dismissed as coincidence, with the true intent claimed to be a response to the 2008 Sichuan earthquakes, "as a precaution against possible natural disasters".

=== Cyprus ===
The Cyprus Civil Defense Force was established in 1964 in response to the Turkish bombings of Tilliria in order to protect the civilian population and to help it recover from the immediate effects of hostilities or disasters.

=== Indonesia ===
Badan Nasional Penanggulangan Bencana or loosely translated into English as National Agency for Disaster Countermeasure is the government agency that has the authority of managing disaster in the national scale.

=== India ===
- Directorate General-Fire Services, Civil Defense & Home Guards (DGFSCDHG) - federal agency of the Government of India
- Kerala Civil Defence

=== Iran ===
The National Organization for Passive Defense is the principle civil defense organization in Iran. It was established in 2003 and is formally subordinated to the General Staff of the Armed Forces of the Islamic Republic of Iran.

=== Israel ===
The Home Front Command, a unit and a military district command of the Israel Defense Forces is the principle civil defense organization in Israel. It was created in February 1992 in response to the lessons of the Gulf War, which was the first war since the 1948 Arab–Israeli War in which centers of civilian population faced significant threat.

=== Lebanon ===
The Directorate General for the Lebanese Civil Defense works alongside the Lebanese Red Cross and is administered by the Ministry of Interior and Municipalities (Lebanon). It provides search and rescue, fire-fighting and pre-hospital services.

=== Malaysia ===
The Malaysia Civil Defence Force is mainly in charge of disaster relief efforts. A separate department the Malaysian Fire and Rescue Department is in charge of the fire and rescue services in Malaysia.

=== Mongolia ===
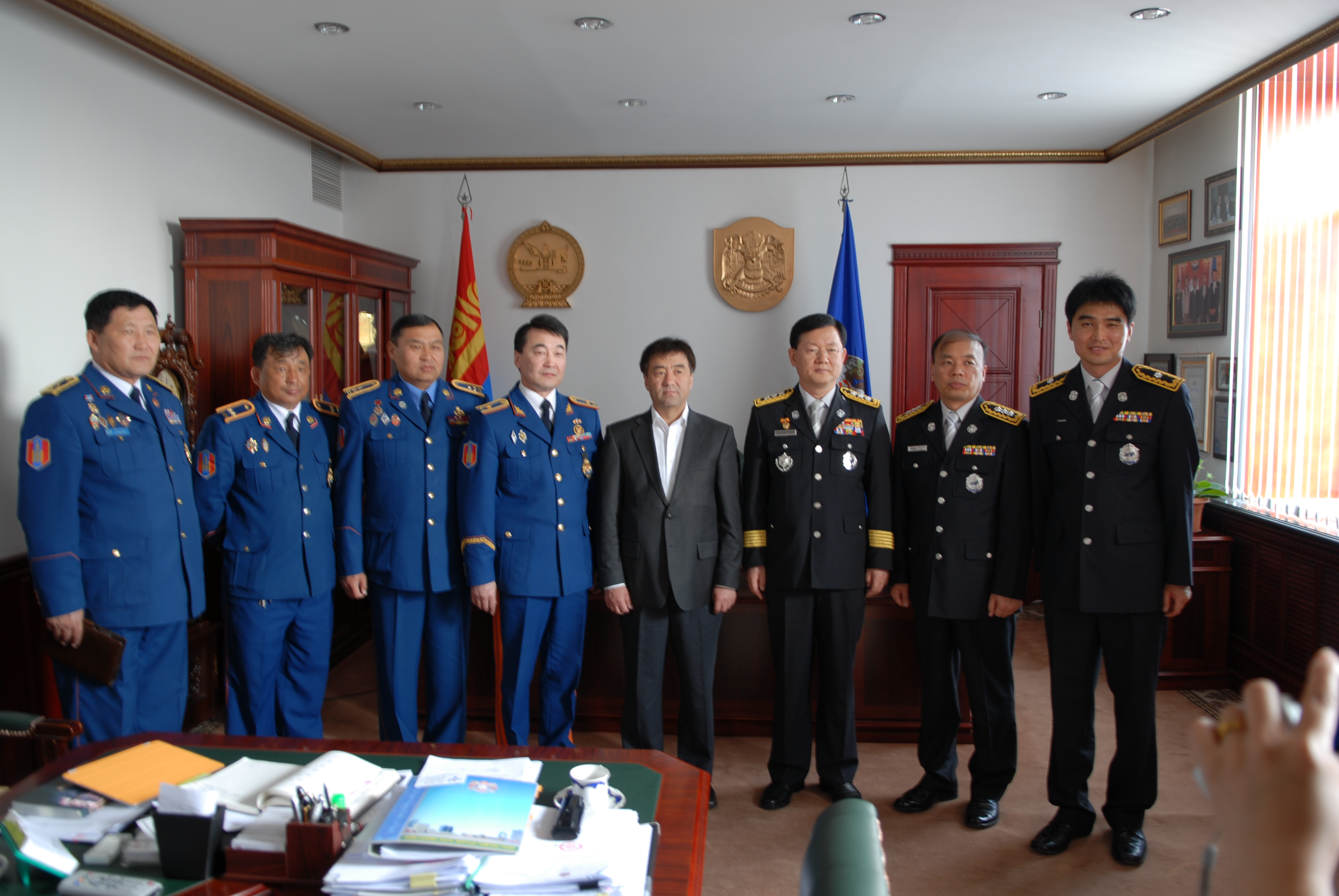
Personnel of the Emergency Management Department with members of the Seoul Metropolitan Fire and Disaster Management Headquarters in Ulanbaatar

The paramilitary National Emergency Management Agency (NEMA) was established by the State Great Khural in June 2003. It was established with the duty to conduct nationwide post-disaster activities. All 21 Aimags as well as the capital of Ulaanbaatar have a NEMA division and department. Similarly to the Post-Soviet Ministry of Emergency Situations, it broadly develops environmental legislation and implements activities on disaster prevention and search and rescue work.

=== Pakistan ===
The Directorate General of Civil Defence provides civil defence services in Pakistan.

=== Philippines ===
The Office of Civil Defense began as the National Civil Defense Administration, established on August 18, 1954 through the Civil Defense Act of 1954. The Department of National Defense exercises executive supervision over the Office of Civil Defense.

On September 27, 2010 the "Philippine Disaster Risk Reduction and Management Act of 2010" was passed to strengthen the country's disaster risk reduction and management system in response to Typhoon Ondoy.

=== Singapore ===
The Singapore Civil Defense Force (SCDF) was established by the Civil Defense Act of 1986 as an independent organization under the Ministry of Home Affairs. The SCDF and the Singapore Fire Service were formally merged in 1989.

=== South Korea ===
On December 15, 2010, Seoul held its largest civil defense drill in since 1975, in response to the Bombardment of Yeonpyeong.

=== Sri Lanka ===
The Sri Lanka Department of Civil Security is a paramilitary force which is tasked as an auxiliary to the Sri Lanka Police. It evolved from the "Home Guards" created in response to attacks by the Liberation Tigers of Tamil Eelam.

=== Syria ===
The Ministry of Emergency and Disaster Management is responsible for developing and overseeing a national system for risk and disaster management in Syria.

=== Taiwan ===
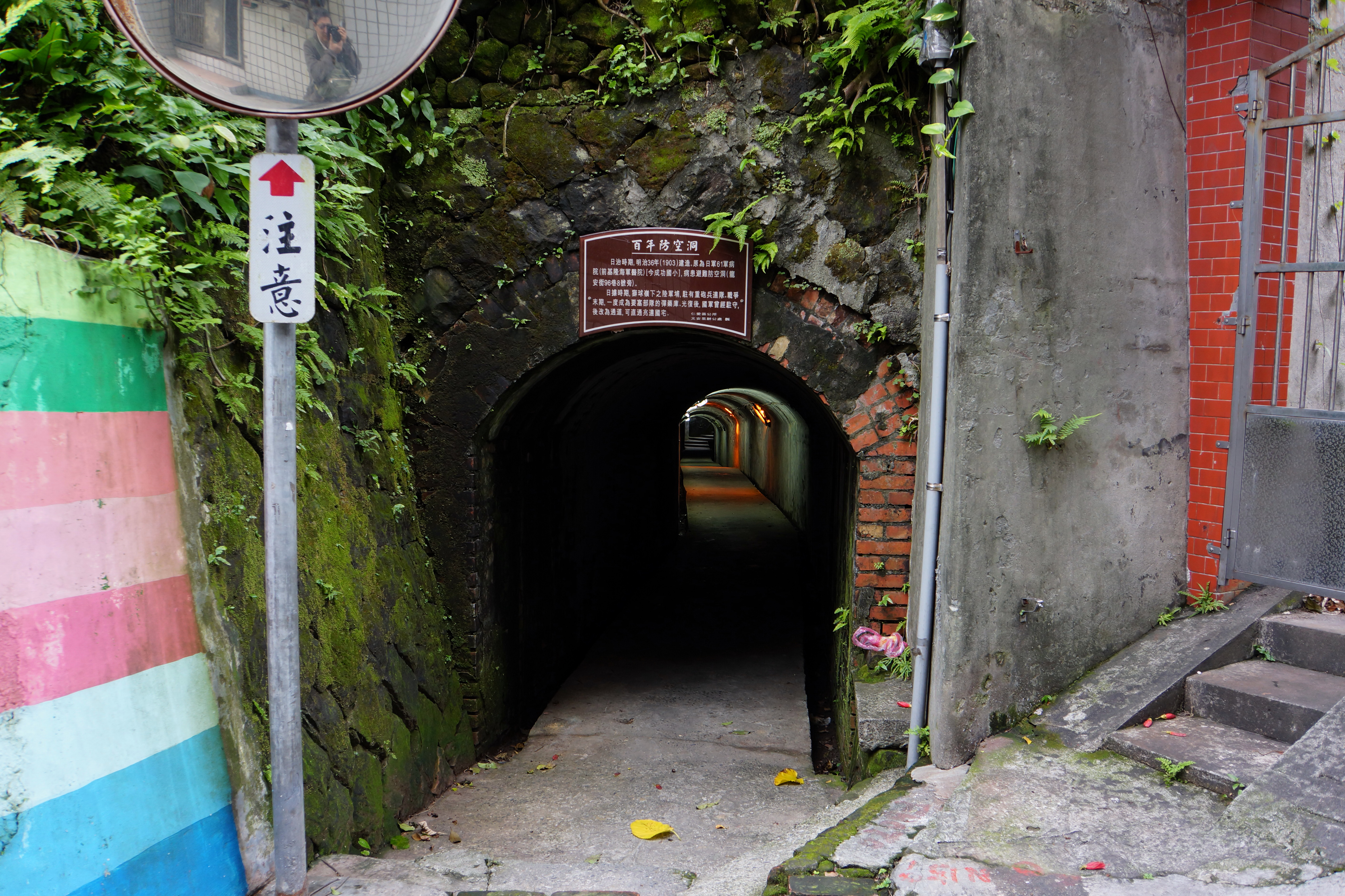
Japanese colonial period bomb shelter in Taiwan

There are more than 117,000 air raid shelters in Taiwan, some dating back to the Japanese colonial period. Many more obsolete shelters as well as military bunkers have been repurposed as commercial, artistic, or public buildings.

=== Turkey ===
Disaster and Emergency Management Presidency (AFAD) is the responsible Turkish institution for coordinating civil defence, and to respond to civil emergencies including those arise from natural disasters. AFAD is a participant of the European humanitarian aid and civil protection mechanism.
General Directorate of Civil Defence under Turkish Ministry of the Interior was the responsible institution in Turkey for civil protection and it was disbanded in 2009 with the establishment of AFAD.

=== Turkmenistan ===
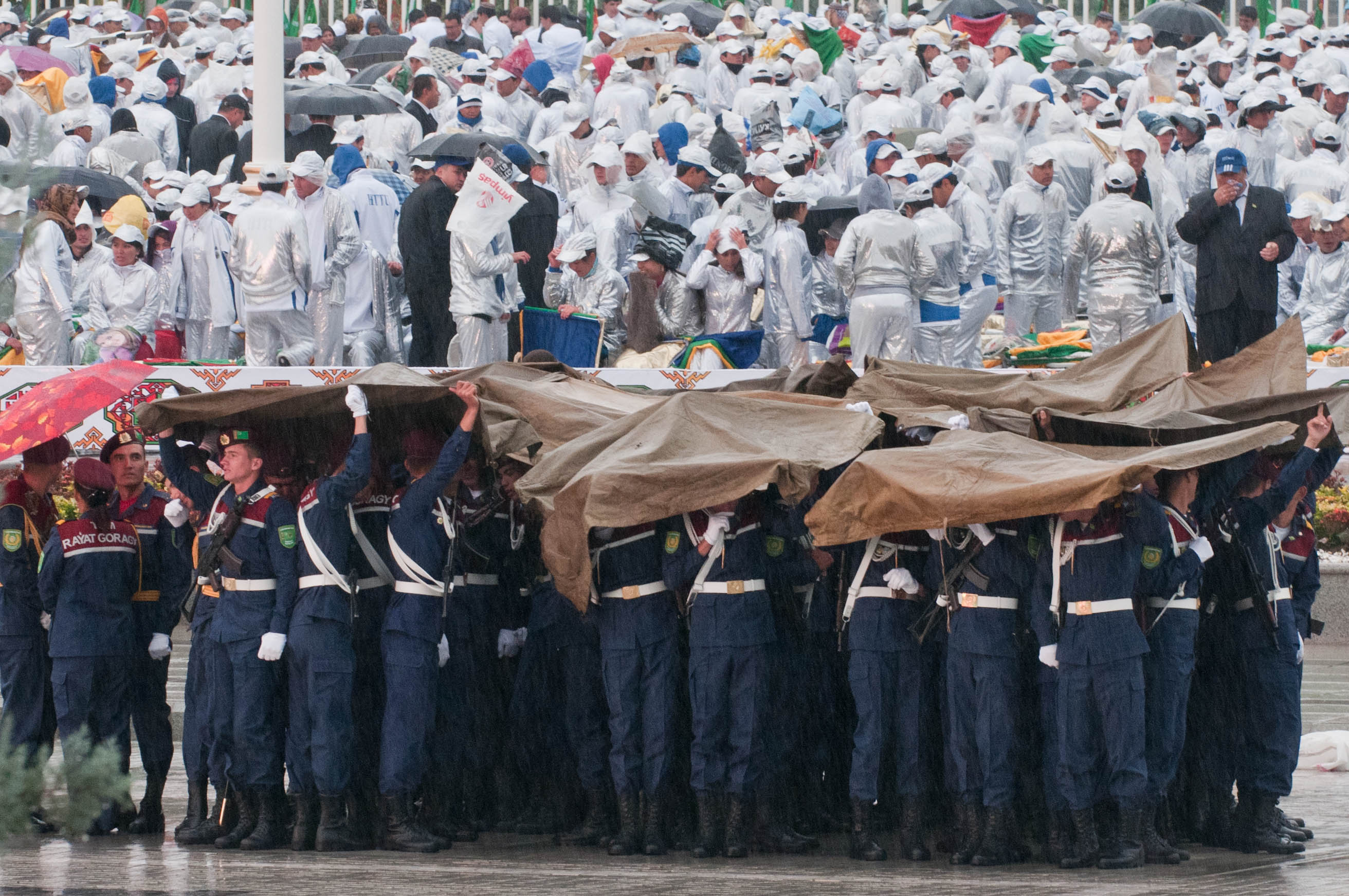
Personnel of the General Directorate of Civil Defense and Rescue at a parade in Ashgabat in 2011

The General Directorate of Civil Defense and Rescue (Turkmen: Raýat goranmak we halas ediş baş müdirligi) is part of the Ministry of Defense of Turkmenistan. It is the civil defense agency of Turkmenistan that is similar organizationally to the Russian Ministry of Emergency Situations. It conducts exercises in the territories of industrial enterprises with non-militarized rescue workers, developing tactics in the event of various natural disasters and/or rescue operations. The directorate opened the Center for Emergency Management in January 2011.

=== United Arab Emirates ===
Dubai has the Dubai Civil Defence organization.

=== Vietnam ===
Vietnam Militia and Self-Defence Force (Vietnamese: Dân quân tự vệ) is part of the Vietnam People's Armed Forces. Their main task is to prevent, combat and overcome the consequences of disasters, incidents, natural disasters, epidemics, fires and explosions; search, rescue, rescue; forest protection, environmental protection and other civil defense tasks according to the provisions of law. They can be deployed as active military soldiers, as it is one of the three branches of the Armed Forces.

== Europe ==
=== European Union ===
In addition to providing funding to humanitarian aid, the European Commission's Directorate-General for European Civil Protection and Humanitarian Aid Operations (DG-ECHO) is in charge of the EU Civil Protection Mechanism to coordinate the response to disasters in Europe and beyond and contributes to at least 75% of the transport and/or operational costs of deployments. Established in 2001, the Mechanism fosters cooperation among national civil protection authorities across Europe. Currently 34 countries are members of the Mechanism; all 27 EU Member States in addition to Iceland, Norway, Serbia, North Macedonia, Montenegro, Turkey and Bosnia and Herzegovina. The Mechanism was set up to enable coordinated assistance from the participating states to victims of natural and man-made disasters in Europe and elsewhere.

=== Albania ===
Civil Protection in Albania is coordinated by Agjencia Kombëtare e Mbrojtjes Civile (National Civil Protection Agency), a department within the Ministry of Internal Affairs of Albania. Established in 2001 as Drejtoria e Përgjithshme e Emergjencave Civile (General Directorate of Civil Emergencies) and renamed in 2019, this agency deals with preparedness and response to natural and man-made disasters.

=== Belgium ===
The Belgian Civil Protection is coordinated by the Federal Public Service Interior (the former Ministry of the Interior) and operates as a specialized second-line service. It is not a first-response service like the fire departments, but is only called upon when specialized assistance is needed. Its main tasks revolve around CBRN incidents, search and rescue operations and heavy technical assistance. As of 2016, the Belgian Civil Protection employs about 1,100 people, of which 450 professionals and 650 volunteers.

=== Denmark ===
The Danish Emergency Management Agency is a governmental agency under the Ministry of Resilience and Preparedness chiefly tasked with preparing for and responding to natural disasters and national emergencies in Denmark. The DEMA is also capable of deploying abroad on request from other states. It evolved from the wartime Civilforsvarsstyrelsen (Civil Defense Agency), and the general public still often refer to it as the Civil Defense.

=== Finland ===
Civil defense in Finland is a civilian effort, coordinated by the Ministry of Interior through the Civil Defense Act of 1958, to provide shelters in high-risk areas, evacuate civilian populations from threatened areas, and limit damage from natural disasters.

=== France ===
The Direction de la Défense de la Sécurité Civile (Department of Civil Defense and Emergency Preparedness) is the civil defence agency of the French Government, which includes the Sous-Direction des Sapeur-pompiers and the Sous-Direction des opérations de Secours et de la coopération civilo-militaire (Rescue operation and civil-military cooperation branch).

=== Germany ===
The German Federal Agency for Technical Relief (THW Technisches Hilfswerk) is an organization of voluntary experts as an authority in the department of the Federal Ministry of the Interior, founded in 1950.

=== Greece ===
In 1995, the civil defense was institutionally established with the establishment of the General Secretariat for Civil Protection at the Ministry of the Interior.

=== Ireland ===
Civil Defence Ireland, established in 1950 in response to the threat of nuclear disaster following "The Emergency", is operated at local authority level in conjunction with the Department of Defence.

=== Isle of Man ===
Established in 1949, the IOMCDC is an emergency service of the Isle of Man Government, with a wide brief for emergency response, civilian evacuation, flood control, disaster management, emergency communications, and mass decontamination.

=== Italy ===
The Civil Protection deals at national level with the forecast, prevention, management and overcoming of human and natural disasters and in emergency situations. It also deals with sector such as forest fire and hydrogeological risk.

=== Monaco ===
The Corps des Sapeurs-Pompiers is a military force, consisting of 135 military personnel and 25 civilian employees, which handles fire-fighting and civil defense duties.

=== Norway ===
The Norwegian Civil Defence support the police, fire departments and health care during larger incidents which those departments do not have the manpower to handle.

=== Poland ===
In July 1950 the Main Headquarters of Local Anti-aircraft Defense (Polish: Komenda Główna Terenowej Obrony Przeciwlotniczej) was established at the Government Presidium, as well as structures within the provincial councils. In 1959, the State Defense Committee was established and had responsibility for defining and prioritizing civil defense related tasks including means and methods for preparing the civilian population, developing evacuation plans and adapting shelters to new threats, preparing conditions for the functioning of state authorities in wartime, and introducing appropriate adjustments to the organizational structures of the Main Headquarters of Local Anti-aircraft Defense.

=== Portugal ===
In Portugal, the National Emergency and Civil Protection Authority works in prevention, preparation, response and recovery activities against natural and technological risks, as well as preventing and fighting rural fires.

=== Romania ===
In Romania, the General Inspectorate for Emergency Situations (Romanian: Inspectoratul General pentru Situaţii de Urgenţă) is the governmental body responsible for nationwide civil defence. Each county has a bureau in charge of emergency management in the area. IGSU is accountable for the construction and maintenance of public ABC shelters.

The concept of centralized civil defence was established by law in 1933, through the Royal Decree 433, to which Col. Gheorghe Pohrib made essential contributions. It continues to be part of various ministries, such as Internal Affairs and Defence.

=== Russia ===
During the Soviet era, specialized civil defence subunits were maintained in order to provide assistance to the population after bombing raids and nuclear, biological or chemical attacks. And today, by law, the Ministry of the Russian Federation for Affairs for Civil Defence, Emergencies and Elimination of Consequences of Natural Disasters civil defence troops must retain such a wartime role. Thus they are charged with the organisation and coordination of Russian military forces for the purpose of civil defence not only during natural and manmade disasters, but also during wartime.

=== San Marino ===
The Civil Police and the Civil Protection Service of San Marino are responsible for civil defence, as well as tax collection, domestic security, and traffic control.

=== Slovenia ===
The Civil Protection in Slovenia (Slovene: Civilna zaščita) is part of the national system for protection against natural and other disasters.

It is coordinated by the Administration of the Republic of Slovenia for Civil Protection and Disaster Relief, which operates under the Ministry of Defence.

The system includes professional and volunteer units, with significant involvement from local municipalities.

Civil Protection has in recent years been involved in responding to various natural and other disasters, including floods, wildfires, and the COVID-19 pandemic.

=== Spain ===
Spain started the civil defence policies in the 1940s and since 1960s, the Directorate-General for Civil Protection and Emergencies, a component of the Ministry of the Interior has existed to develop the government policy on civil protection. In addition, the Spanish regions and municipalities also have their own civil defence plans. Also, since 2006 there is a military unit, the Military Emergencies Unit.

=== Sweden ===
Swedish civil defense "consists of a diverse range of activities conducted by society to strengthen the ability to cope with a state of heightened alert and war." Sweden's objectives of civil defence are to: protect the civilian population; contribute to peace and security; and strengthen societies ability to prevent and manage severe peacetime emergencies.

=== Switzerland ===
The Swiss Federal Office for Civil Protection (FOCP), under the Federal Department of Defence, Civil Protection and Sports, is responsible for the coordination of civil defense services. It operates the National Emergency Operations Center (NEOC) and the Spiez Laboratory, which is responsible for weapons of mass destruction research and protection. Switzerland built an extensive network of fallout shelters during the cold war, including the Sonnenberg Tunnel. The reference Nuclear War Survival Skills declared that, as of 1986, "Switzerland has the best civil defense system, one that already includes blast shelters for over 85 percent of all its citizens." As of 2006, there were about 300,000 shelters built in private residences, institutions and hospitals, as well as 5,100 public shelters for a total of 8.6 million places, a level of coverage equal to 114% of the population. Switzerland also has mandatory stockpiling of essential goods.

=== Ukraine ===
Formerly a ministerial level agency, today the State Emergency Service of Ukraine is part of Ministry of Internal Affairs.

Before 2005, in Ukraine existed the Civil Defense Troops.

=== United Kingdom ===
During the inter-war period, and Second World War, the United Kingdom called upon Air Raid Precautions to supplement existing emergency services and create wartime specialist services. This service, later called the Civil Defence Service, was disbanded in 1945. The Civil Defence Corps was a civilian volunteer organisation established in Great Britain in 1949 as the primary organisation for civil defence work, primarily concerned with nuclear war preparations but could respond to civil emergencies; it was supported by the Auxiliary Fire Service, National Hospital Service Reserve, Industrial Civil Defence Service and the Royal Observer Corps. The CDC, AFS, NHSR and ICDS were disbanded in 1968.

A number of organisations have been created to try and emulate the work of Civil Defence, but none are government funded or recognised as such. However, Emergency Preparedness is the responsibility of agencies under the Civil Contingencies Act 2004, with professional emergency planners in place.

Some of these organisations are:

- Association of Lowland Search and Rescue
- Mountain Rescue England and Wales
- British Cave Rescue Council
- Civil Aid Voluntary Rescue Association
- St John Ambulance
- British Red Cross
- The Salvation Army
- Radio Amateurs Emergency Network
- RE:ACT Disaster Response
- Serve On Search and Rescue
- The Joint Civil Aid Corps (National Civil Defence)

== Oceania ==
=== Australia ===
Australia's State Emergency Service is a fully volunteer organization intended to provide emergency help during and after officially declared disasters. The SES is one of many public safety organizations using the Australasian Inter-Service Incident Management System.

=== New Zealand ===
The National Emergency Management Agency (NEMA) is the public civil defense department of the Department of Prime Minister and Cabinet in New Zealand. The agency administers the Civil Defence Emergency Management Act 2002 in its duties. NEMA's child agency is the National Crisis Management Centre.
