= Ballakilpheric =

Coordinates: 54°06′26″N 4°43′01″W

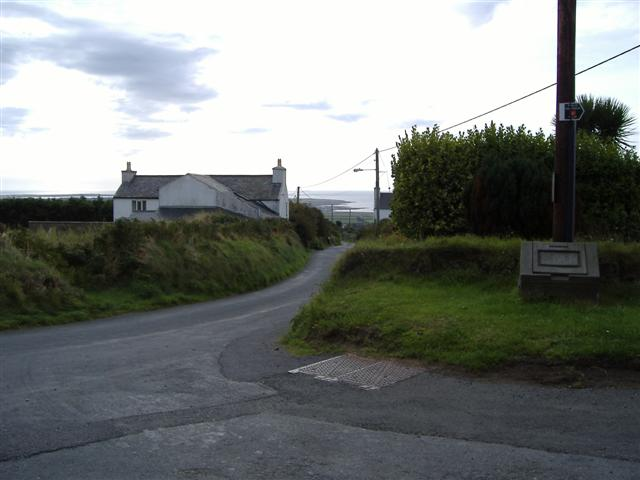
- Ballakilpheric. Looking down the road leading to Colby

- Location within the Isle of Man
- Crown dependency: Isle of Man
- Post town: ISLE OF MAN
- Postcode district: IM
- Police: Isle of Man
- Fire: Isle of Man
- Ambulance: Isle of Man

Ballakilpheric (Manx: Balley Keeill Pherick; meaning "settlement of St Patrick's church") is a small village in the parish of Rushen (recently amalgamated with Arbory for administrative purposes) in the southwest of the Isle of Man, 1 kilometre (0.6 mi) northwest of the larger village of Colby, and 8 kilometres (5 mi) by road northeast of Port Erin. It is the main settlement on the B44 road. The small Colby River flows to the east of the village, and forms the boundary with Arbory parish. Ballakilpheric Methodist Chapel lies at the top of the hill.

== History ==
There were several Neolithic stones in the vicinity. At the Ballakilpheric Standing stone site (grid reference 222716), in 1878 four stones were still standing together in a crescent, but by 1900 there were two, 10 ft (3.0 m) tall and 28 ft (8.5 m) apart and now there is just one. An Early Bronze Age flat axehead was unearthed in a field near Ballakelly Cottage in the village in 1975; it is currently part of the Manx National Heritage Collection. An archaeological find of early medieval artifacts in the area is known as the Ballakilpheric hoard.

== Landmarks ==
Ballakilpheric Methodist Chapel is situated at the top of a hill. There is a large white house called Burn Brae, past Ballakilpheric Farm, and another large house called Belle Abbey House.

== Culture ==
A traditional harvest festival is held at Ballakilpheric Methodist Chapel in September. The Manx Gaelic language singing group Caarjyn Cooidjagh released a CD entitled Ballakilpheric. The album features traditional songs from the Isle of Man.
