= Isle of Man Coastguard =

- Coastguard badge
- Motto: Quocunque ieceris stabit Whichever way you throw, it will stand

Agency overview
- Formed: 1989

Jurisdictional structure
- Operations jurisdiction: Isle of Man
- Specialist jurisdiction: Coastal patrol, marine border protection, marine search and rescue

Operational structure
- Headquarters: Marine Operations Centre, Douglas
- Elected officer responsible: Jason Moorhouse MHK, Minister of the Dept of Infrastructure
- Agency executives: Vacant, Operations Manager, Harbours & Coastguard; Kevin Scott, Rescue Team Manager; Michael MacDonald, Coastguard Operations Officer
- Parent agency: Harbours Division, IOM Government

Facilities
- Stations: 1 control centre, 5 operational stations

The Isle of Man Coastguard also known as the Manx Coastguard is the coastguard service of the Isle of Man Government. It is responsible for the provision of coastguard services throughout the Isle of Man, an independent Crown dependency located in the Irish Sea between England and Ireland. Its main responsibilities are coastal search and rescue, maritime search & rescue, and first strike counter pollution around the coast.

== History ==
Historically, coastguard services were provided to the Isle of Man by His Majesty's Coastguard, the coastguard service of the United Kingdom. Although the Isle of Man is not part of the United Kingdom, it has historically received certain services from United Kingdom agencies. HM Coastguard maintained a principal coastguard co-ordination station at Ramsey in the north of the island. In 1988 HM Coastguard closed the Ramsey station, and announced that following 120 years of operation on the island its services would now be provided from stations in neighbouring England. The Isle of Man Government responded by establishing its own coastguard service, which began operating in 1989. The Isle of Man Government subsequently contracted with HM Coastguard for the provision of air-sea rescue services, but maintained its claim of self-determination in respect of its territorial waters. Negotiations with the United Kingdom on this point led to the Isle of Man Government formally purchasing its own territorial waters in 1991.

== Structure ==
The Coastguard is one of four sections within the Harbours Division of the national Government, the others being Harbour Operations (in the Isle of Man's eight principal harbours), Territorial Sea Management, and Administration. The Manx Coastguard maintains five Coastguard Stations, one at each of the towns of Douglas, Castletown, Port Erin, Peel, and Ramsey. Although some full-time staff are employed, a majority of Coastguard personnel are volunteers. They must be physically fit, live close to a Coastguard station, and be aged between 18 and 50 years. In 2013, owing to insufficient numbers to maintain the service, the Coastguard began a recruitment drive in the southern part of the island.

== Command ==
Coastguard personnel work in teams attached to one of the five coastguard stations, or at the marine Operations Centre (MOC). Each station has a Station Officer in command, assisted by a Deputy Station Officer; staff at the MOC are supervised by a Senior Watch Officer, assisted by a Watch Officer. Until 2010 Station Officers and Watch Officers reported to a Sector Manager, who was responsible to the Chief Coastguard. From the establishment of the service in 1989 until 2010 the first Chief Coastguard was Colin Finney.

In 2010 Colin Finney was promoted to the role of Operations Manager for Harbours and Coastguard, which is the senior management role for the Harbours Division of the Isle of Man Government, with overall responsibility for the Coastguard and the other sections of Harbour Division. At that time the role of Chief Coastguard was abolished, as was the rank of Sector Manager. The duties formerly assigned to the Chief Coastguard and the two Sector Managers are now shared between the Operations Manager, and the two senior coastguards, the Coastguard Operations Officer (responsible for pollution, salvage, evaluation, search and rescue plans and procedures, the Marine Operations Centre, and multi-agency liaison) and the Rescue Team Manager (responsible for rescue teams, coastguard stations, training, and equipment).

Isle of Man Coastguard Ranks and Insignia
1989–2010	Rank	Chief Coastguard	Sector Manager	Senior Watch Officer	Station/Watch Officer	Deputy Station Officer	Section Leader	Coast Guard
1989–2010	Epaulette Insignia							
2010–current	Rank		Operations Manager	Senior Watch Officer	Station/Watch Officer	Deputy Station Officer	Section Leader	Coast Guard
2010–current	Epaulette Insignia							

== Marine Operations Centre ==
From 1989 to 2009 all 999 (emergency telephone number) calls were diverted to the United Kingdom and answered by HM Coastguard's operations room at Liverpool. Staff in Liverpool then alerted and mobilised the necessary Isle of Man personnel. In 2007 the IOM Chief Coastguard Officer announced the development of an independent control centre, and in 2009 the Marine Operations Centre (MOC) opened in Douglas. It has a staff of eleven people who maintain cover 24 hours a day, 365 days a year, answering all emergency telephone calls, and tasking Coastguard assets to respond where necessary. The Chief Coastguard Officer stated that handling calls locally, rather than through a control room in the United Kingdom, maintained the integrity of the IOM service, provided operators with a higher degree of local knowledge, and removed a "dog leg" from the system of responding to emergency calls. The number of 999 emergency calls directed to the Isle of Man Coastguard was 285 in 2008.

== Assets ==
The Coastguard service owns and operates a marine operations centre, five operational stations, and four-wheel drive emergency response vehicles at each station, with emergency equipment trailers. A considerable quantity of equipment is maintained at each station: from rescue tools, winches, and medical supplies, to uniform items. Every Coastguard is equipped with personal protective equipment (PPE) including dry suits, wet suits, helmets, and uniform overalls with logos, rank markings, and hi-visibility patches. The Coastguard operates small boats. Although air-sea rescue is contracted to the UK Coastguard, rescues by boat are handled by the Isle of Man Coastguard. Offshore rescues are tasked through the Coastguard Marine Operations Centre to the RNLI's lifeboat service, whilst inshore rescues are often handled by Coastguard crews in their own small boats.

== Isle of Man Inland Search and Rescue Group ==
The IOMISRG is a joint force consisting of volunteers from four of the five official Government emergency services on the Isle of Man, namely the IOM Constabulary, the IOM Coastguard, the IOM Civil Defence Corps, and the IOM Fire and Rescue Service. The umbrella organisation provides a forum for joint planning and management, as well as jointly resourced operational inland search and rescue teams. The joint organisation enabled the establishing of SARDA Isle of Man, a local branch of the National Search and Rescue Dog Association (NSARDA), with a small team of search and rescue dogs and handlers.

== Emergency services on the Isle of Man ==
- Isle of Man Ambulance Service
- Isle of Man Civil Defence Corps
- Isle of Man Constabulary (Police)
- Isle of Man Fire and Rescue Service
