= Civil Defence Medal =

Civil Defence Long Service Medal
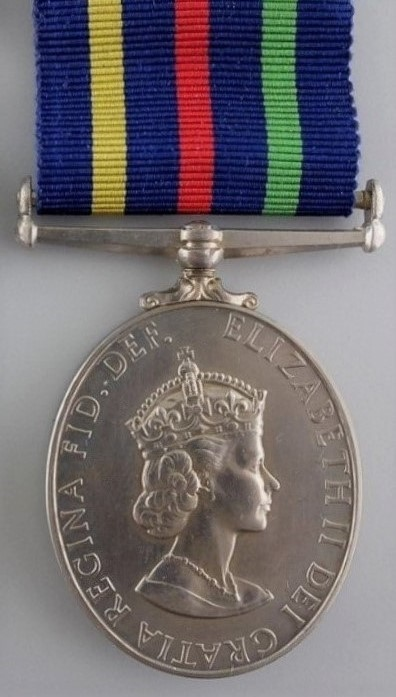
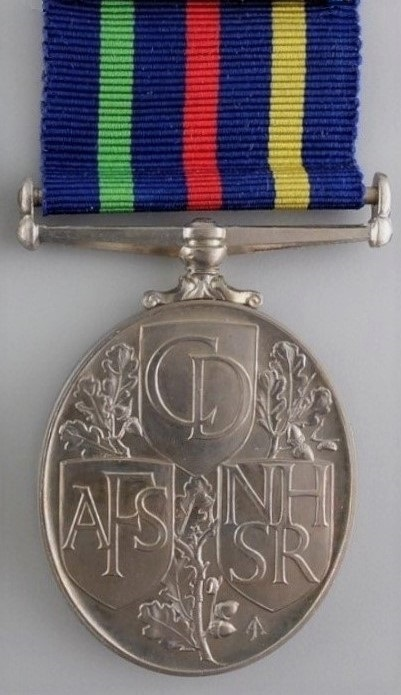
- Obverse and original reverse
- Type: Long service medal
- Presented by: the United Kingdom and Crown dependencies
- Established: 1961
- Second award clasp Ribbon bar of the medal

Order of Wear
- Next (higher): Royal Observer Corps Medal
- Next (lower): Ambulance Service (Emergency Duties) Long Service and Good Conduct Medal

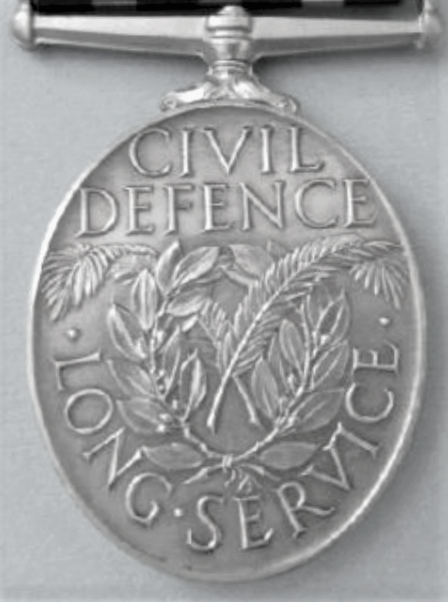
Reverse, second type

The Civil Defence Medal (CDM) is a long service award by the United Kingdom, instituted by Queen Elizabeth II in March 1961 and awarded for 15 years continuous service in a variety of different organisations including the Civil Defence Corps (CD), the Auxiliary Fire Service (AFS), the National Hospital Service Reserve (NHSR) and the United Kingdom Warning and Monitoring Organisation. Qualification was extended in 1963 to Civil Defence personnel in Gibraltar, Hong Kong and Malta.

With most of the eligible organisations disbanded, the medal is currently only awarded to civil defence volunteers on the Isle of Man.

== Description ==
An oval medallion measuring 38mm in height by 32mm wide in silver coloured cupronickel.
Obverse: The crowned head of Queen Elizabeth II and the legend ELIZABETH II DEI GRATIA REGINA FID. DEF.
Reverse: The original 1961 medal depicted three shields, each bearing the initials of one of the three main services: CD, AFS and NHSR, with an oak branch in the background. A separate Northern Ireland version had the initials AFRS (Auxiliary Fire and Rescue Service) and HSR (Hospital Service Reserve) on the last two shields. When the award was extended to Gibraltar, Hong Kong and Malta in 1963, a new reverse was designed, bearing the words CIVIL DEFENCE and LONG SERVICE, separated by a design of laurel wreaths and palms. This was the only design in use after 1968.

A bar clasp bearing the words LONG SERVICE, attached on the ribbon, was issued for each further period of 12 years service.

The medal hangs from a straight bar, with a 32mm wide ribbon of dark blue with three narrow stripes of yellow red and green. The yellow is worn furthest from the left shoulder.

Miniature medals for wear at black tie events remain available from several commercial sources.

== Naming ==
The medals were issued unnamed.

== Disestablishment of the recipient organisations ==
The Auxiliary Fire Service, National Hospital Service Reserve and Civil Defence Corps were disbanded in 1968, with those serving in their fifteenth year, or twenty-seventh year for the bar, receiving the medal even though they had not completed their full qualifying service. On the UK mainland, only members of the United Kingdom Warning and Monitoring Organisation continued to qualify after 1968, until it too was disbanded in 1992 (the Warning and Monitoring Organisation on the Channel Islands of Jersey continued until 2007). The medal was awarded in Hong Kong until the territory was transferred to China in 1997. The medal is still awarded to members of the Isle of Man Civil Defence Corps, with two members receiving clasps to the medal in 2011 from the Lieutenant Governor, Vice Admiral Sir Paul Haddacks KCB KStJ.
