= Starum =

The Norwegian Civil Defence and Emergency Resource Center, Oppland civil defence district is located at Starum, Norway. The Norwegian Civil Defence is a state resource enhancement for public safety agencies when handling large and special events - an important player in the Norwegian rescue service. After the Cold War ended, the Civil Defence to an even stronger degree increased its support to local communities' emergencies in peacetime.

The district is also the education centre for the Norwegian Civil Defence. This means that the district is responsible for training crews for all levels of civil defence – in addition to having a wide range of courses aimed at safety agencies (fire, police and healthcare), the voluntary aid organizations and fund public and NGOs.

== History ==
The camp was until the 1980s stand for a quarter of "Hærens kløvkompani" and headquarters for the Army's veterinary service. When the Army left in 1980s, parts of Starum camp divested to a local "Equestrian", while the rest was taken over by the Norwegian Civil Defence.
