= Gravesend Civil Defence Sub-Divisional Control Centre =

Cold War control bunker in Gravesend, Kent, England

Coordinates: 51.4311°N 0.3643°E

The Gravesend Civil Defence Sub-Divisional Control Centre is a former Cold War-era Sub-Divisional Control Centre near Gravesend, Kent in England.

== Description ==
It is situated under what is now Woodlands Park.

It was completed in 1954 and was part of Civil Defence Region 6.

The bunker is now a listed building. As of 2024, guided tours were available.
