= Isle of Man Fire and Rescue Service =

British fire service

Operational area
- Country: Isle of Man
- Address: Isle of Man Fire and Rescue Service Department of Home Affairs Headquarters Tromode Road Douglas IM2 5PA

Agency overview
- Established: 1940
- Employees: 163
- Chief Fire Officer: Mark Christian
- Motto: To be the safest small island community

Facilities and equipment
- Stations: 7

Website
- www.gov.im/categories/home-and-neighbourhood/emergency-services/fire-and-rescue-service/

The Isle of Man Fire and Rescue Service (Manx: Shirveish Mooghey as Savail Ellan Vannin) is the fire brigade of the Isle of Man Government, providing fire and rescue cover throughout the Isle of Man, an independent Crown Dependency located in the Irish Sea between England and Ireland. The service operates under the Department of Home Affairs.

== History ==
The Isle of Man received its first two fire engines from England in October 1803. These were independently operated by an insurance company and were horse-drawn and hand-operated.

The Douglas Town Act of 1860 provided for the establishement of a public fire service, and in 1862 this was created with 12 full time staff. This was followed by the Peel commissioners establishing a fire service in 1884, followed by Port Erin in 1903 and Laxey in 1920. The outbreak of war brought calls for a unified fire brigade. In February 1940, the Local Government (Fires) Act was implemented, establishing a single Isle of Man Fire Brigade, with seven fire areas - Douglas, Laxey, Ramsey, Kirk Michael, Peel, Rushen, and Castletown. These fire areas are the same today.

== Structure and ranks ==
A total of 110 retained (part-time) firefighters are stationed across all seven of the island's fire stations. Douglas fire station has a permanent watch of full-time firefighters, numbering 32 in total, working in shifts. The service is headed by a Chief Fire Officer (Mark Christian, appointed 2023), and has a rank structure based on that of the United Kingdom.

Current title	Chief fire officer	Deputy chief fire officer	Divisional officer	Assistant divisional officer	Station officer	Sub-officer	Leading firefighter	Firefighter
Rank insignia								

== Fire stations and appliances ==
The service has seven fire stations. The largest, at Douglas, is crewed by both wholetime firefighters and retained firefighters, whilst the other six stations at Laxey, Ramsey, Kirk Michael, Peel, Rushen and Castletown, are staffed by retained crews only. Retained firefighters make up around two thirds of the total complement of just over 150 firefighters.

== Ronaldsway Airport Fire and Rescue Service ==
In common with most international airports, the Isle of Man Airport, historically known as Ronaldsway Airport, maintains its own independent fire service. This service cooperates closely with the Isle of Man Fire and Rescue Service. The airport fire station is now considered too small for its current appliances and crews, and a contract has been awarded for the construction of a new £200,000 fire station, starting in 2022–2023.

== Emergency services on the Isle of Man ==
- Isle of Man Ambulance Service
- Isle of Man Civil Defence Corps
- Isle of Man Coastguard
- Isle of Man Constabulary (Police)
