= Isle of Man Civil Defence Corps =

- Active: 1949-present
- Country: Isle of Man
- Type: Civil Defence Corps
- Size: 50+ personnel
- Part of: Department of Home Affairs
- Garrison/HQ: EPU & CDC HQ, Douglas
- Colours: Blue and orange

Commanders
- Emergency Planning Co-ordinator: Jane Kelly
- Commandant: Norman McBride
- Minister of the Dept of Home Affairs: The Hon Jane Poole-Wilson MHK

Insignia
- Badge

- Standard

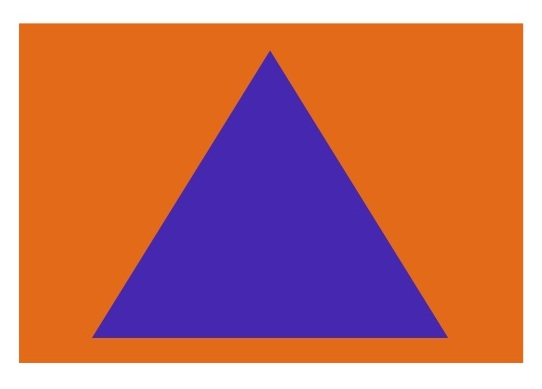
- Tactical Recognition Flash

The Isle of Man Civil Defence Corps is one of the five emergency services maintained by the Isle of Man Government, to provide a range of emergency responses on the Isle of Man, an independent Crown dependency located in the Irish Sea between the England and Ireland. The corps operates under the Department of Home Affairs.

== History ==
The Civil Defence Corps was founded in 1949 by the United Kingdom Government, and operated throughout England, Scotland, and Wales, as well as on the Isle of Man. Its primary purpose was to co-ordinate civil defence in the event of a nuclear attack during the Cold War period. It was largely disbanded in 1968 (although some specialist units lasted longer in connection with special duties). The Isle of Man is not part of the United Kingdom, and in 1968 the Isle of Man Government decided not to disband its Division of the Civil Defence Corps, and it has continued to operate ever since, as the IOM Civil Defence Corps. Similar organisations continue to operate in New Zealand, Iceland, Ireland, and Australia.

In 2012, twenty-eight volunteers of the Civil Defence Corps were awarded the Queen's Diamond Jubilee Medal by the then Home Affairs Minister, Juan Watterson MHK. There was also a special presentation to two stalwarts of the organisation, Stewart Kermeen and Mike Dobson, who had both completed 27 years of service, joining Martin Blackburn and Norman McBride as the island's other recipients of this rare award. They were awarded the clasp to the Civil Defence Long Service Medal in recognition of their outstanding commitment to the island’s "fifth emergency service".

== Structure and ranks ==
The Minister of Home Affairs is the senior elected politician responsible for the Department which controls the Civil Defence Corps. The senior manager is the IOM Emergency Planning Co-ordinator, who is the head of the island's Emergency Planning Unit (EPU). This is an executive organisation under Government control, providing emergency planning solutions to both Government and the private sector. The Emergency Planning Co-ordinator is essentially a civil servant, but they are a uniformed officer, with rank markings which resemble those of a fire brigade senior divisional officer, and the Civil Defence Corps cap badge on his headdress. The Civil Defence Corps as an operational unit, under the supervision of the Emergency Planning Co-ordinator, is headed by a Commandant. The members are divided into five teams, each headed by a Team Leader and a Deputy Team Leader.

Isle of Man Civil Defence Ranks and Insignia
Rank	Emergency Planning Officer	Assistant Emergency Planning Officer	Commandant	Deputy Commandant	Team Leader	Deputy Team Leader	Volunteer
Epaulette Insignia							

== Equipment ==
Civil Defence Corps teams operate in all-terrain vehicles in a blue livery, with Civil Defence markings. As a front line emergency service they operate with strobing blue lights and sirens. Vehicles carry basic first aid and rescue equipment. They also operate a fleet of minibuses for personnel transport and civilian evacuation, as well as mobile command centres and catering units. Trailers are operated with equipment including mobile lighting units and generators, and air tents.

== Responsibilities ==
Civil Defence Corps teams carry out training on Wednesday nights throughout the year. They are responsible for a range of duties including establishing a command post in connection with any civil emergency, and evacuating the civilian population where necessary. The key areas of responsibility for the CDC are defined as:

- search and rescue – on the inland hills and open areas of the island
- first aid – all CDC members hold a first aid qualification
- driving – all members hold a clean driving licence, and many hold specialist driver training qualifications such as MIDAS or HGV
- communications – CDC staff maintain communications in an emergency situation by means of TETRA radio
- flood response - All members are trained in basic domestic salvage techniques, the safe use and maintenance of water pump equipment and the use of sandbags. During high tides and severe weather IoM Civil Defence works alongside other emergency services and local authorities to alleviate the effects of flooding.
- emergency catering
- evacuation, and evacuation centres
- chemical, biological, radiological and nuclear monitoring – CBRN equipment is deployed and members are trained in mass decontamination techniques
- civil emergency equipment maintenance - equipment such as air-raid sirens and portable generators is maintained and regularly tested

== Ceremonial function ==
As an emergency service the Civil Defence Corps maintains a military-style discipline, and its members wear uniform. This also allows them to be deployed on ceremonial duties in processions and parades ranging from Remembrance Sunday to the island's Tynwald Day. The Civil Defence Corps flag is paraded on such occasions by the Corps Standard Bearer, and uniformed members march in support of the flag.

== Isle of Man Inland Search and Rescue Group ==
The IOMISRG is a joint force consisting of volunteers from four of the five official Government emergency services on the Isle of Man: the IOM Constabulary, the IOM Coastguard, the IOM Civil Defence Corps, and the IOM Fire and Rescue Service. The umbrella organisation provides a forum for joint planning and management, as well as jointly resourced operational inland search and rescue teams. The joint organisation maintains the island's only trained SARDA (Search and Rescue Dog Association) dog and handler.

== Emergency services on the Isle of Man ==
- Isle of Man Ambulance Service
- Isle of Man Civil Defence Corps
- Isle of Man Coastguard
- Isle of Man Constabulary (Police)
- Isle of Man Fire and Rescue Service
