= Ballakilpheric Methodist Chapel =

Manx Methodist church building

Coordinates: 54°06′24″N 4°43′00″W

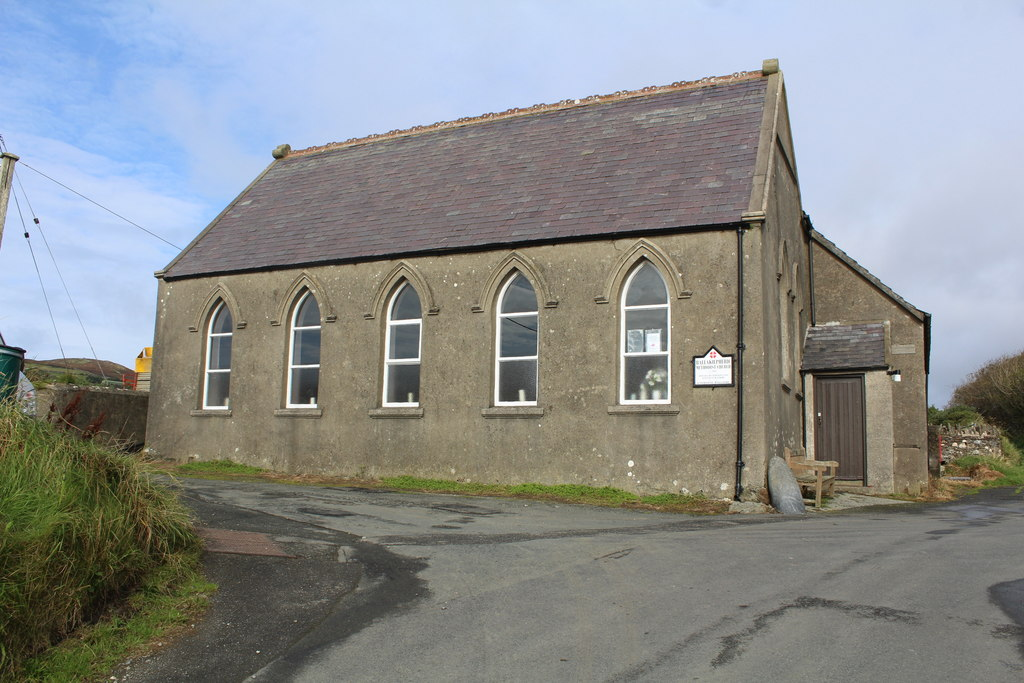
Ballakilpheric Methodist Church

The Ballakilpheric Methodist Chapel, or Ballakilpheric Chapel, is a Methodist church in the village of Ballakilpheric on the Isle of Man.

Services such as coffee and biscuits are offered, alongside community-based events held in the old school room hall or the chapel. It has a small congregation; festivals such as Christmas, Feast and Easter are celebrated annually.

== History ==
Before the chapel was constructed, services were held in the farmhouse of Tom the Dipper.

First built in 1850, later extensions would bring the addition of a Sunday school in 1889. The costs would come to £195.

In 1937, the installation of electric lights was funded by the widower Richard R. Kermode, a local Methodist preacher. It was proposed that electric heating be installed, and this was added in 1938, when heating was still rather rare in the south of the island. The event would be marked with a large ceremony and conducted service.

In the later half of World War II, the chapel would raise money for the war effort. Many of its donations would go to the Manx Prisoner of War Fund. During the Christmas period of 1944, the choir would raise £13. The amount was split, with 6 pounds and 12 shillings going to the prisoner of war fund and the rest to the National Children's Homes in London.

In 1957, the chapel hosted a free comedy show for the sunday school, with refreshments handed out to the children.

By 2024, urgent repairs were needed. This would include safety inspections, heating in the school room, repairs on the buildings exterior, repairs to the drains and new floorings. In the hope of raising some funds, Culture Vannin would showcase historic short films at the chapel for the public. On the 20 July 2025, the chapel's 175th anniversary was celebrated. As of May 2026, only 10% of the goal has been met. The money raised so far is £3,500 out of the £35,000 goal.
