= National Hospital Service Reserve =

Civil defence organisation in Britain

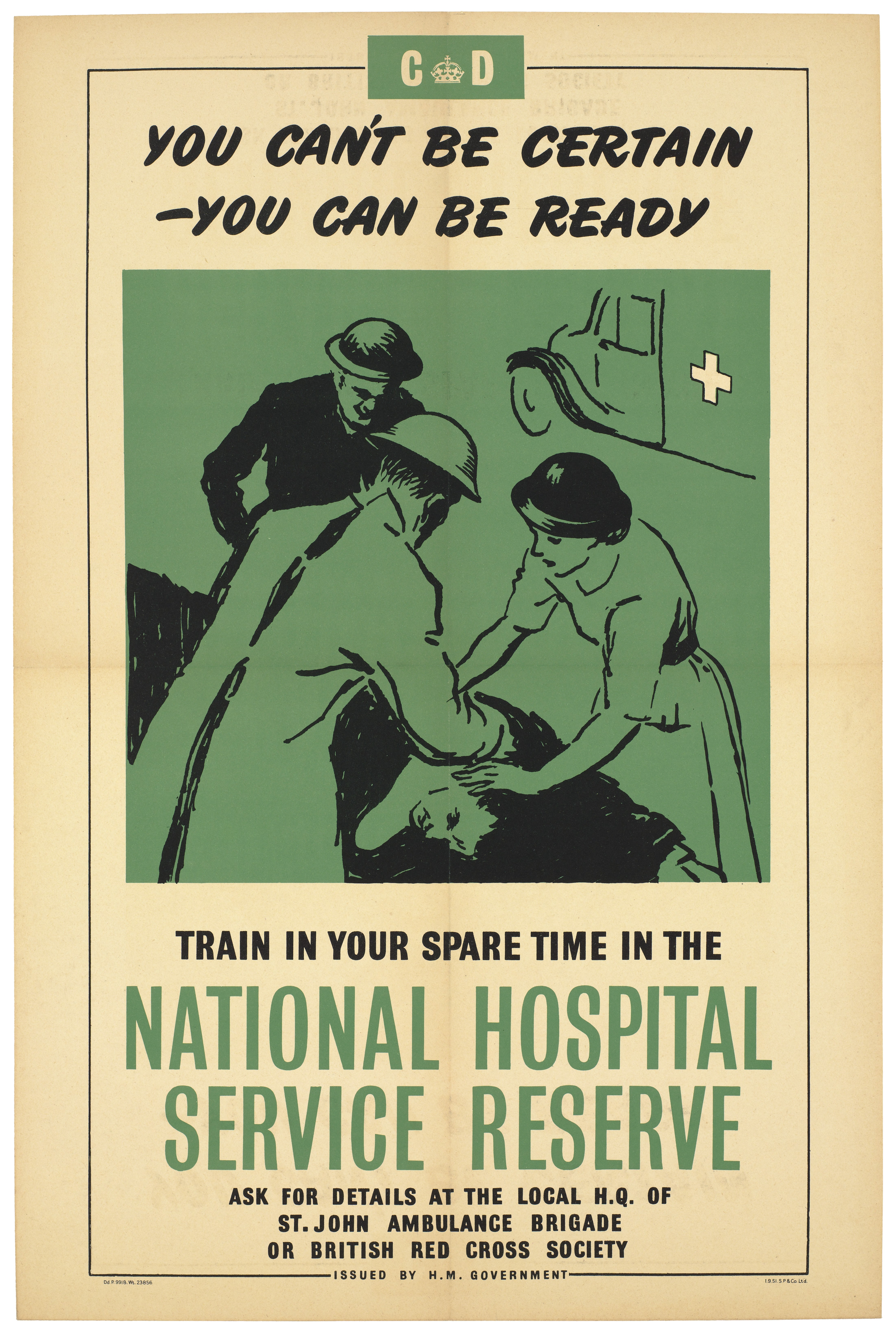
Recruiting poster

The National Hospital Service Reserve was a British civil defence organisation established under the Civil Defence Act 1948 to provide a reserve of trained nurses, midwives, ambulance staff and first aiders to supplement full-time staff in times of war. Recruitment began in 1949 and volunteers were required to carry out 48 hours of training per year, with which the British Red Cross, St John Ambulance Brigade and St Andrew's Ambulance Association voluntary organisations assisted. The NHSR had a target membership of 80,000 persons in peacetime, by March 1967 it mustered 69,335. The organisation was disbanded on 1 August 1968, with members directed towards alternative volunteering opportunities in hospitals.

== Formation ==
The National Hospital Service Reserve (NHSR) was formed under the Civil Defence Act 1948, with recruitment starting on 15 November 1949. Its foundation came at a time when British civil defence was shifting focus from dealing with the effects of conventional air raids to the aftermath of a nuclear attack. The NHSR had its origins in a working party of the British Red Cross, St John Ambulance and War Office formed after the passing of the 1948 act to propose medical civil defence measures to operate during a large-scale war. The NHSR became one of four organisations expected to play a role in civil defence together with the Civil Defence Corps, also established in 1949; the Auxiliary Fire Service, which had been re-established in 1948, and the pre-existing Special Constabulary.

== Organisation and equipment ==
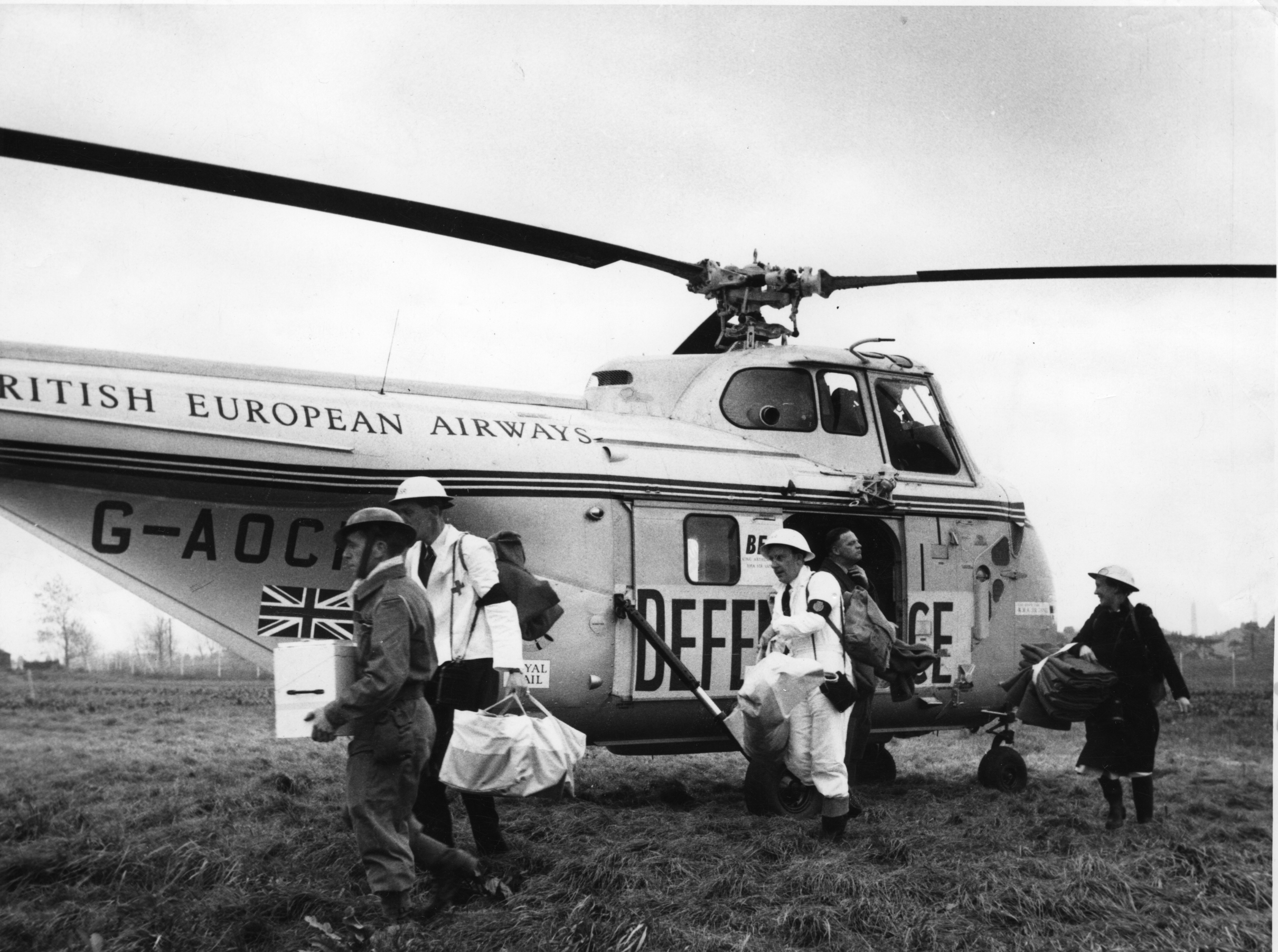
Auxiliaries of the NHSR arrive by helicopter alongside a nurse and doctor during a civil defence exercise in Croydon in 1955

The aim of the NHSR was to provide a reserve of men and women with qualifications in first aid and nursing. Members of the unit were required to undertake 48 hours of training per year. In times of war they would provide additional staff for hospitals and man 2,000 mobile first aid units and 800 static first aid posts. The St John Ambulance, British Red Cross and St Andrew's Ambulance assisted in training and organising the NHSR, with members also providing voluntary assistance to hospitals in peacetime to hone their skills. Training exercises included practice in first aid techniques likely to be required in the aftermath of a nuclear or chemical attack.

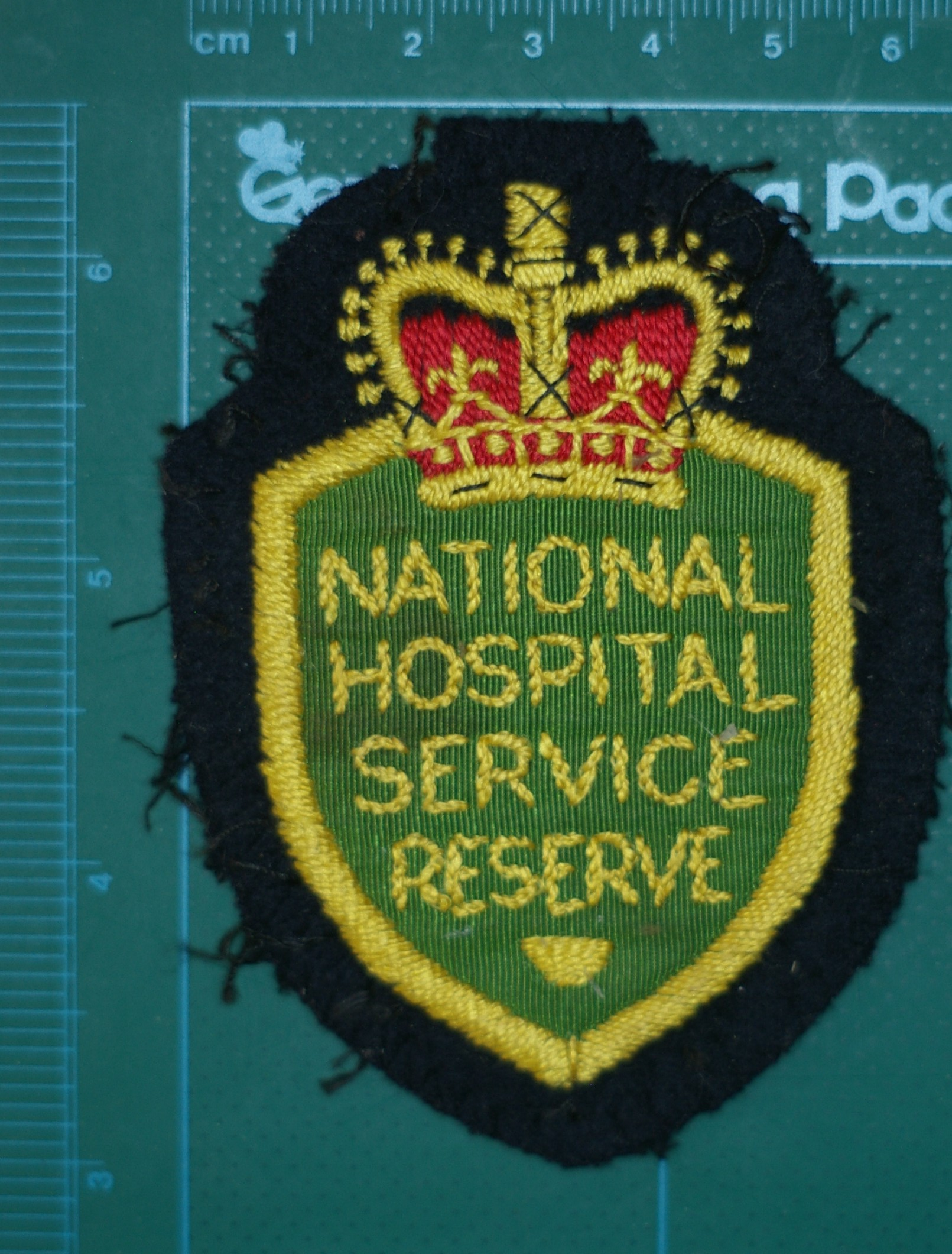
Embroidered badge worn on the uniform arm of NHSR Personnel

The organisation was nation-wide but in Scotland was managed by the Secretary of State for Scotland rather than the UK's Minister of Health. Executive committees for each regional hospital board managed the NHSR in their region. The committees were chaired by an experienced nurse and members included the chief nursing officer of the region and representatives of St Andrew's Ambulance, the British Red Cross and the Ministry of Labour and National Service. They were assisted, when needed, by representatives from the region's local authorities. In times of emergency the NHSR would be mobilised by order of the responsible minister or secretary of state.

Members of the NHSR belonged to one of three classes: nurses and midwives; nursing auxiliaries and ambulance auxiliaries. The former category was recruited by the regional hospital boards and the latter two were recruited and trained by the ambulance societies. The NHSR aimed to have 80,000 members in peacetime, rising to 100,000 in times of war. By the end of 1953 the NHSR had 35,000 members. This rose to 46,000 by 1954 and 49,664 by the end of 1958, of which 4,061 were nurses or midwives. A national rally was held at the Royal Albert Hall in November 1959 to commemorate the 10th anniversary of the organisation. By March 1967 the organisation had 69,335 members.

There was no single uniform for the organisation, unlike the Civil Defence Corps. A 1953 article by the Institute of Civil Defence argued that introducing one would provide "glamour" that "is unlikely to attract recruits of integrity and determination". It was noted that around 50% of the nursing and ambulance auxiliaries in the organisation were also members of the ambulance societies and were entitled to wear those uniforms. NHSR members were issued some equipment on a local basis. In Cardiff male members in the 1950s wore a charcoal-grey woollen greatcoat with the NHSR emblem (the organisation's name on a shield surmounted by a crown) embroidered on the left sleeve. Some members were issued Brodie helmets of WWII vintage painted cream with "NHSR" in black lettering on the front.

Members were eligible for the Civil Defence Medal, instituted in 1961, upon completion of 15 years' service.

== Disbandment ==
The NHSR was stood down in 1968, alongside the Civil Defence Corps. The NHSR was disbanded on 1 August 1968 by Ministry of Health Circular HM (68) 52. The disbandment came under Harold Wilson's Labour government. Minister of Health Kenneth Robinson noted that his civil servants had suggested that hospitals look to offer alternative opportunities for former NHSR members to volunteer in peacetime. The Civil Defence Corps was disbanded due to persistent shortages of volunteers which resulted from the widely held belief that the extensive damage hydrogen bombs would inflict on the UK in a nuclear war made it pointless to prepare for such a conflict.
