= Norwegian Civil Defence =

Emblem

The international distinctive sign of civil defence, defined by the rules of International Humanitarian Law and to be used as a protective sign

Traditional coat of arms

Norwegian Civil Defence (Norwegian: Sivilforsvaret) is the civil defence organization of Norway.

The Norwegian Civil Defence sorts under the Norwegian Directorate for Civil Protection and Emergency Planning which again reports to the Ministry of Justice and Public Security. The organization is based on conscription where both men and women between the age of 18 and 55 can be called to serve. The Civil Defence reinforce emergency response in peacetime and protects the civilian polpulation in accordance with the Geneva conventions in war.

== Organization ==
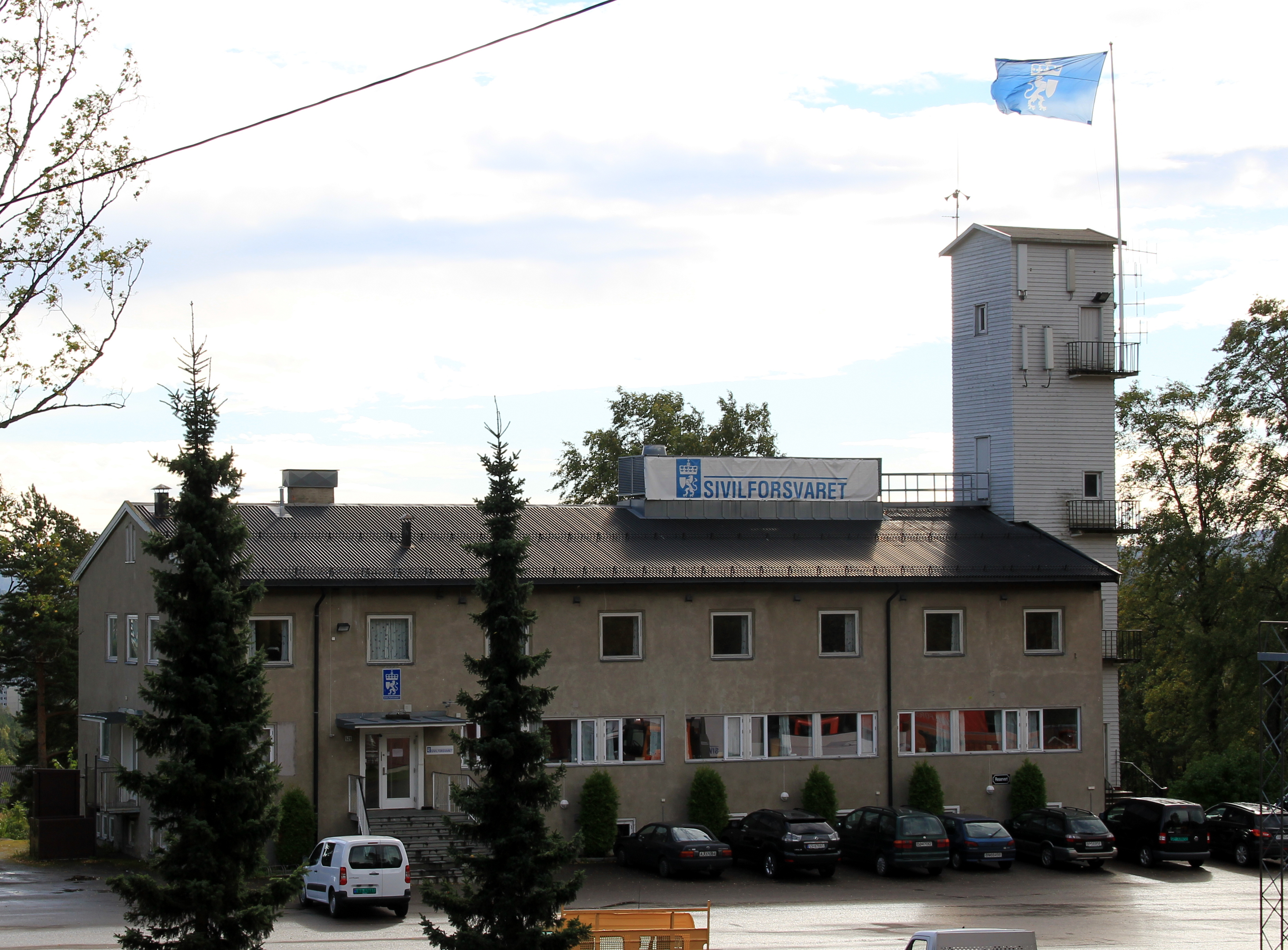
Norwegian Civil Defence headquarters in Oslo

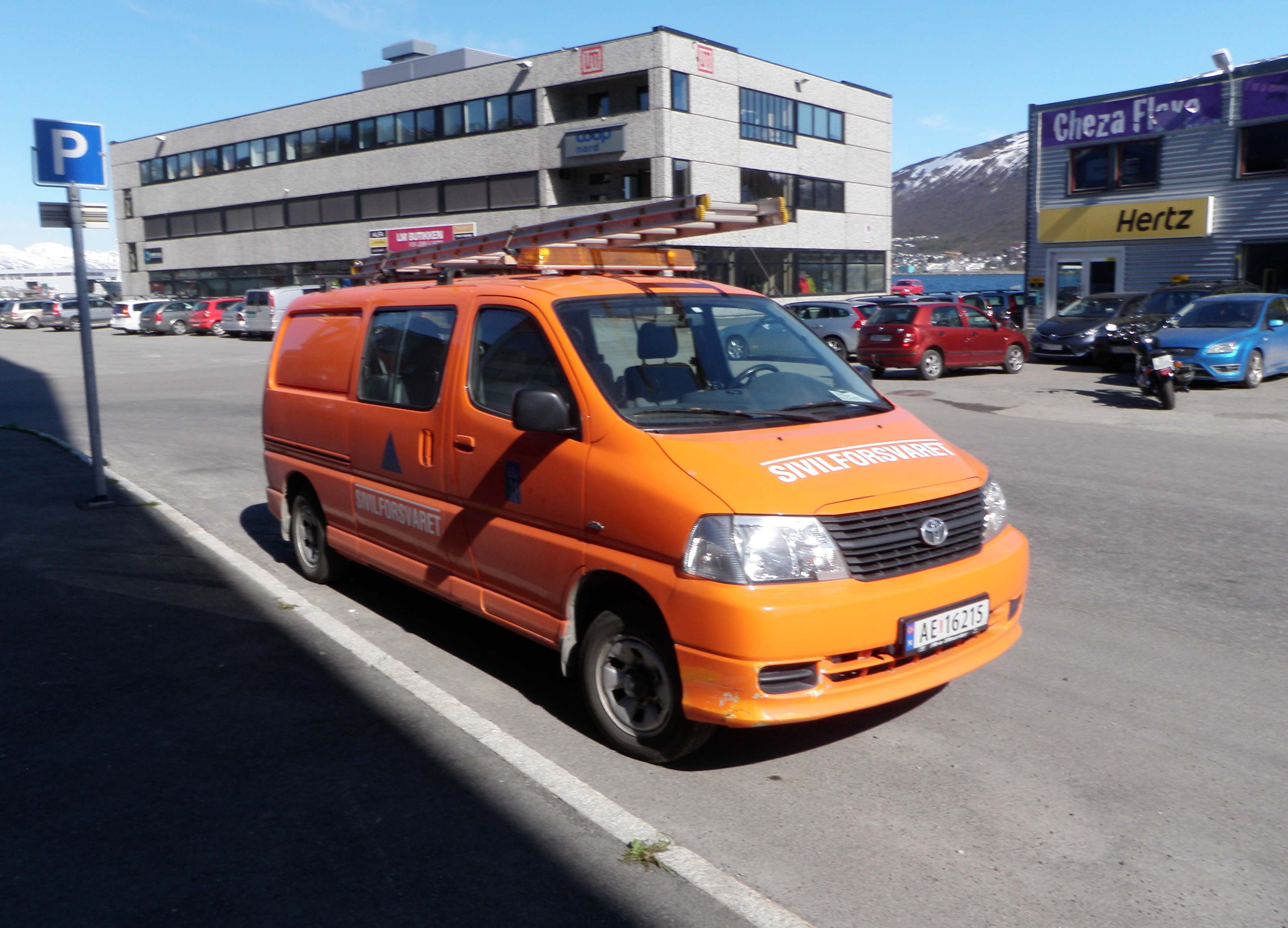
Norwegian Civil Defence van in Tromsø

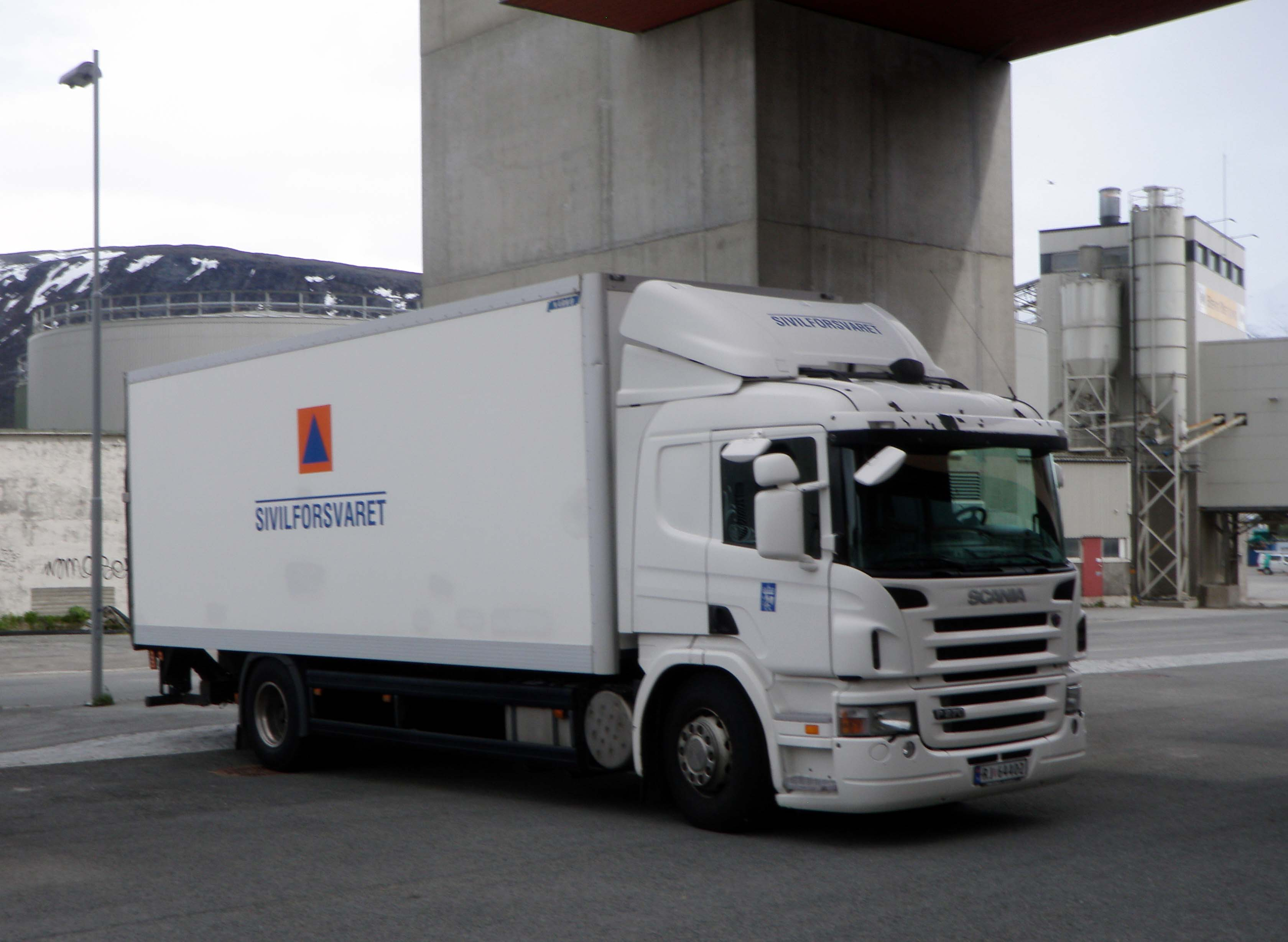
Norwegian Civil Defence Scania lorry outside Tromsø fire station

The Norwegian Civil Defence is split into.

- Peacetime Contingency Teams (FIG)
- Peacetime Contingency Teams - Personnel (FIG-P)
- Mobile Decontamination Units (MRE)
- Air Alert Service (LVG)
- Radiation measurement patrols (RAD)

As of 2016 the Norwegian Civil Defence has an operative force of 8,000 men and women with duty to serve. In addition, a wartime reserve force will be trained and equipped should the need arise.

=== Peacetime Contingency Teams (FIG) ===
The most active part of the Norwegian Civil defence. Each FIG contains 22 persons, one FIG leader and a second in command. The rest of the personnel are divided in two teams led by a team leader, and a second team leader. The FIG personnel are to respond to a call-out within one hour and there are 119 active teams in the country

=== Peacetime Contingency Teams – Personnel (FIG-P) ===
This is a release-reinforcement unit for the FIG. The personnel have exactly the same training as FIG. FIG-P have a call-out time of 30–60 minutes. Normally there is one Fig-P troop per FIG unit, divided in two teams.

=== Mobile Decontamination Units (MRE) ===
There are 17 mobile clean-up units in the organization. Each group consists of 24 persons that are specially trained in decontamination of people that has been exposed to chemical, biological, or radioactive agents (CBRN).

The teams are equipped with a rapid deployable mobile decontamination unit that can be deployed at any site where chemical, biological or radioactive contamination had been detected.

=== Radiation Measurement patrols (RAD) ===
This is the smallest unit in the organization and consists of four personnel trained in measuring radioactivity. The unit measures background radiation at set locations and times for comparison. They are also trained in location radioactive materials.

There are 123 teams currently operating.

== Ranks and rank insignia ==
Rank insignia of the Norwegian Civil Defence
Rank insignia	Regular	National service	National service reserve
	Sjef for sivilforsvaret Director of Civil Defence		
	Distriktssjef; District Director		
	Sivilforsvarsinspektør I Assistant Civil Defence Director I		Stabssjef; Chief of Staff
	Sivilforsvarsinspektør II; Assistant Civil Defence Director II		
	Sivilforsvarsadjutant I Chief Civil Defence Officer I		SF-sjefskontrollør; Chief Controller Civil Defence; Rådgiver stab Staff Adviser
	Sivilforsvarsadjutant II; Chief Civil Defence Officer II	FIG-leder; Peacetime Contingency Team Leader; FIGP-leder; Peacetime Contingency Team Leader - Personnel; MRE-leder; Mobile Decontamination Unit Leader; IG-leder; Contingency Team Leader; STG-leder; Support Team Leader	Seksjonsleder stab Section Leader Staff; SF-kontrollør; Civil Defence Controller; LVG-skiftleder; Air Alert Service Shift Leader
	Sivilforsvarsbetjent; Civil Defence Officer	IG-nestleder; Assistant Contingency Team Leader; STG-nestleder; Assistant Support Team Leader	Materiellforvalter; Supply Officer; Lege; Medical Officer; LVG-operatør; Air Alert Service Operator; Stabsmedlem; Staff Member
		FIG-nestleder; Assistant Peacetime Contingency Team Leader; FIGP-nestleder; Assistant Peacetime Contingency Team Leader - Personnel; MRE-nestleder; Assistant Mobile Decontamination Unit Leader	Kvartermester; Quartermaster; Sykepleier; Nurse; Sambandsleder; Communications leader
		Lagfører; Squad Leader	
		Nestlagfører; Assistant Squad Leader; Patruljeleder; Patrol Leader; Kvartermesterassistent; Assistant Quartermaster	

== History ==
The Norwegian Civil Defence was first founded as the voluntary air protection (Norwegian: Det Frivillige Luftvern) in 1936. It was later renamed to the civil air protection (Norwegian: Det Sivile Luftvern). The primary task for the organization was to protect civilians in case of war. This is also evident in the law from 1953 (Norwegian: Lov om sivilforsvar) that still governs the organization. Even so, the organization has adapted to the change in threats against civilians.

== See also ==
- Civil defense by nation
