= Panama Civil Defense Seismic Network =

The Panama Civil Defense Seismic Network collects and studies ground motion from about 60 seismometers throughout Panama. These stations monitor volcanoes, tectonic activities, rivers, and tsunami to give fast, real-time information and warnings about these potential hazards.
