= Civil Defence Corps =

UK civil defence unit

- Active: 1949–1968
- Disbanded: 31st March 1968
- Country: United Kingdom
- Type: Civil Defence
- Colours: Blue and orange

The Civil Defence Corps (CDC) was a civilian volunteer organisation established in Great Britain in 1949 to mobilise and take local control of the affected area in the aftermath of a major national emergency, principally envisaged as being a Cold War nuclear attack. By March 1956, the Civil Defence Corps had 330,000 personnel. It was stood down in Great Britain in 1968. Many other countries maintain a national Civil Defence Corps, including the Isle of Man Civil Defence Corps and the Civil Defence Ireland in the Republic of Ireland. These corps usually have a wide brief for assisting in large scale civil emergencies such as flood, earthquake, invasion, or civil disorder.

== Organisation ==
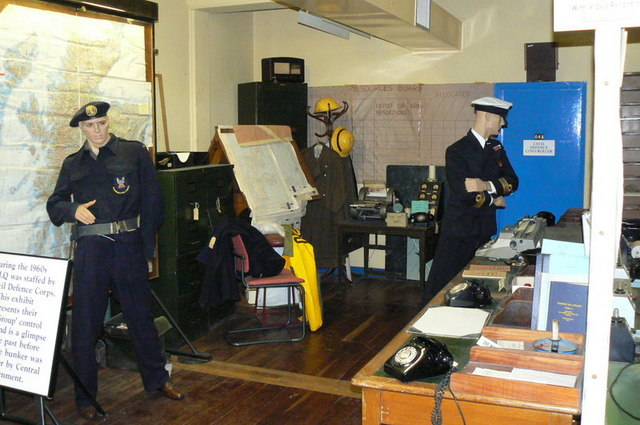
Recreation of a Civil Defence Corps Operations Room in the Scottish Central Belt (2008)

Although under the authority of the Home Office, with a centralised administrative establishment, the corps was administered locally by Corps Authorities. In general every county was a Corps Authority, as were most county boroughs in England and Wales and large burghs in Scotland. The CDC was never established in Northern Ireland. Each Corps Authority established its own Division of the corps.

Each division was divided into several sections:

- Headquarters Section, responsible for staffing control centres and divided into three sub-sections.
  - Intelligence and Operations Sub-Section, responsible for recording and analysing information and preparing instructions.
  - Signal Sub-Section, responsible for installing, operating and maintaining communications systems.
  - Scientific and Reconnaissance Sub-Section, responsible for advising controllers on scientific and technical aspects of nuclear, biological and chemical warfare, and providing reconnaissance parties (especially to monitor nuclear fallout).
- Warden Section, responsible for local reconnaissance and reporting, and leadership, organisation, guidance and control of the public.
- Rescue Section, responsible for rescue operations, demolition and debris clearance.
- Ambulance and First Aid Section, built around peacetime local ambulance services. This section did not exist in Scotland, where the Scottish Ambulance Service was expected to perform ambulance functions and specialist casualty wardens of the Warden Section to perform first aid functions.
  - Ambulance Sub-Section, responsible for the operation of ambulances to transport casualties to Forward Medical Aid Units (FMAU). (Note: A mobile unit provided by the local National Health Service hospital and each staffed by four doctors, four nurses and thirty-six nursing auxiliaries, as well as administrative staff.)
  - First Aid Sub-Section, responsible for basic first aid at the scene and the removal of casualties by stretcher to ambulances.
- Welfare Section, responsible for the welfare of those rendered homeless and/or deprived of normal facilities, including evacuation, accommodation, feeding, sanitation, clothing, nursing, information etc.

In London the City of London and London boroughs were Corps Authorities, but their divisions only had Headquarters, Warden and Welfare Sections. The London County Council organised the Rescue and Ambulance and First Aid Sections centrally and also shared responsibility for the Welfare Sections.

From 1949 to 1968, the Civil Defence Corps Training School was at Taymouth Castle in Scotland. The Castle was also one of the sites for PYTHON, the plan for continuity of government in the event of nuclear war.

The Civil Defence Corps was disbanded due to persistent shortages of volunteers which resulted from the widely held belief that extensive damage which would be inflicted by hydrogen bombs in a nuclear war made it pointless to prepare for such a conflict.

== Uniforms and insignia ==
Members of the corps were issued with dark blue battledress and berets. A system of horizontal bars and point-down chevrons was used to indicate rank.

Rank Insignia	Intelligence & Operations Sub-Section	Signal Sub-Section	Scientific & Recce Sub-Section	Warden Section	Rescue Section	Welfare Section	Ambulance Sub-Section	First Aid Sub-Section
	Division Chief Officer			Chief Warden	Chief Rescue Officer	Chief Welfare Section Officer	Chief Ambulance Officer	
	Senior Staff Officer	Senior Signal Officer	Senior Scientific Intelligence Officer	Deputy Chief Warden	Deputy Chief Rescue Officer	Deputy Chief Welfare Section Officer	Deputy Chief Ambulance Officer	
					Column Rescue Officer		Column Ambulance Officer	
				Assistant Chief Warden	Deputy Column Rescue Officer		Deputy Column Ambulance Officer	
	Staff Officer (Operations); Staff Officer (Intelligence); Sector Staff Officer	Signal Officer	Scientific Intelligence Officer; Reconnaissance Officer	Sector Warden	Company Rescue Officer	Assistant Chief Welfare Section Officer	Company Ambulance Officer	Company First Aid Officer
				Deputy Sector Warden	Deputy Company Rescue Officer	Senior Welfare Section Officer	Deputy Company Ambulance Officer	Deputy Company First Aid Officer
				Post Warden	Platoon Rescue Officer		Platoon Ambulance Officer	Platoon First Aid Officer
		Signalmaster		Deputy Post Warden	Deputy Platoon Rescue Officer	Welfare Section Officer	Deputy Platoon Ambulance Officer	Deputy Platoon First Aid Officer
	Operations Clerk; Intelligence Clerk	Signal Clerk; Field Cable Party Leader	Reconnaissance Party Leader	Senior Warden	Rescue Party Leader	Welfare Section Detachment Leader	Ambulance Detachment Leader	First Aid Party Leader
					Deputy Rescue Party Leader		Deputy Ambulance Detachment Leader	Deputy First Aid Party Leader

== Equipment ==
The Civil Defence Corps initially inherited vehicles and equipment that had been stored since the end of the Second World War. However, it was realised that a nuclear attack demanded a different kind of response from the wartime experience, potentially wiping out any local emergency response and communications in the affected area, so from 1954 there was a new approach to training and equipment to reflect this. It included a new rescue manpack and the purchase of new vehicles.

The headquarters sections were equipped with mobile control centres, despatch riders, and Land Rovers equipped for reconnaissance (e.g. to measure radiation levels, damage, and road accessibility). These were fitted with radio to communicate back to base, and could carry a second radio for forward communication to personnel on foot. To repair or establish communication, there were also field cable party Land Rovers towing trailers for cable laying.

A reconnaissance detachment comprised four Land Rovers, each with a crew of four (driver, leader/navigator, radiac operator, wireless operator), which would be sent in on three parallel paths towards an area affected by a nuclear strike (with one vehicle spare). The radio operator would be in touch with area control at a base station, which could be a mobile station based in a Fordson Thames signal office vehicle, or could be in a local town hall. The wireless equipment was Pye or BCC and operated at 155 or 168MHz. These mid-1950s radios (like the military equivalent) were 12 volt, using the vehicle supply or batteries. A second 5-channel radio operating at 96Mhz was fitted between the driver and navigator and could be used to communicate with personnel on foot. These vehicles were fitted with hard tops with side windows. The Radiac operator would gather radiation level measurements that would be analysed together with wind patterns by the intelligence section.

The field cable party Land Rovers were soft-tops towing Brockhouse trailers with both cable and poles, so that cables could be carried over roads. Establishment of communications was one of the first priorities. Other vehicles included rescue trucks, equipped with a wide range of rescue equipment and trained staff with Rescue Manpacks, and welfare vehicles, as well as ambulances.

== Industrial Civil Defence Service ==
The Industrial Civil Defence Service was a similar organisation to the Civil Defence Corps, but separate from it. Every industrial or commercial undertaking which employed two hundred or more people could form a civil defence unit to protect its own property and staff. These units were organised in a similar way to the Civil Defence Corps, with Headquarters, Warden, Rescue, First Aid and Fire Guard Sections. The Fire Guard Section managed fire points and smaller fire appliances. Each unit had its own control post, and groups of units could form a group control post. Group control posts and control posts in larger factories had the status of warden posts in their own right, whereas smaller units answered to their local Civil Defence Corps warden post.

== See also ==
- Air Raid Precautions
- Civil Defence Ireland
- Civil Defence Medal
- Civil Defence Service
- Civil defense by country
- Isle of Man Civil Defence Corps
- Royal Observer Corps
- Singapore Civil Defence Force
- Federal Emergency Management Agency
