= Isle of Man Ambulance Service =

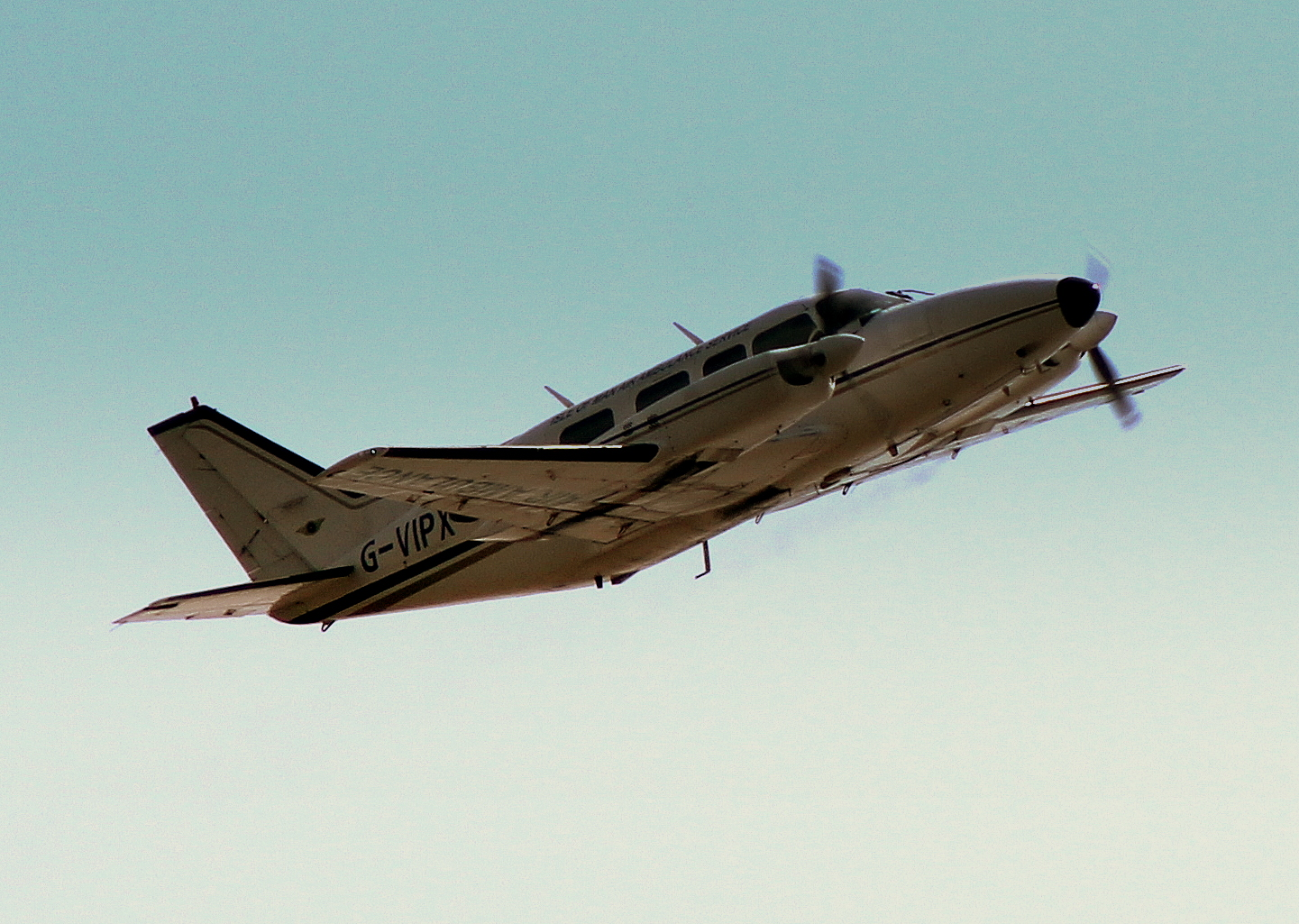
- Established: 1994
- Headquarters: Isle of Man Ambulance Service Ambulance Headquarters Cronk Coar Noble’s Hospital Braddan Isle of Man IM4 4RJ
- Jurisdiction: Isle of Man
- Ambulances: 10 Ambulances 10 Paramedic Cars 1 Air Ambulance (Plane, Pictured above)
- CEO: Will Bellamy
- Website: https://www.gov.im/categories/health-and-wellbeing/isle-of-man-ambulance-service/

The Isle of Man Ambulance Service is a sub-division of the Department of Health and Social Care.

The Isle of Man has ten ambulances and ten paramedic cars; operating from three bases: Douglas (Ambulance Service HQ at Noble’s Hospital), Ramsey (Ramsey Cottage Hospital) and Castletown and Malew combined fire and ambulance Station. There are four operational ambulances on duty during the day, and three overnight, supported by a paramedic duty officer.
