= Douglas, Isle of Man =

Capital city of the Isle of Man

Coordinates: 54°09′00″N 04°28′39″W

Douglas: Manx: Doolish
- City
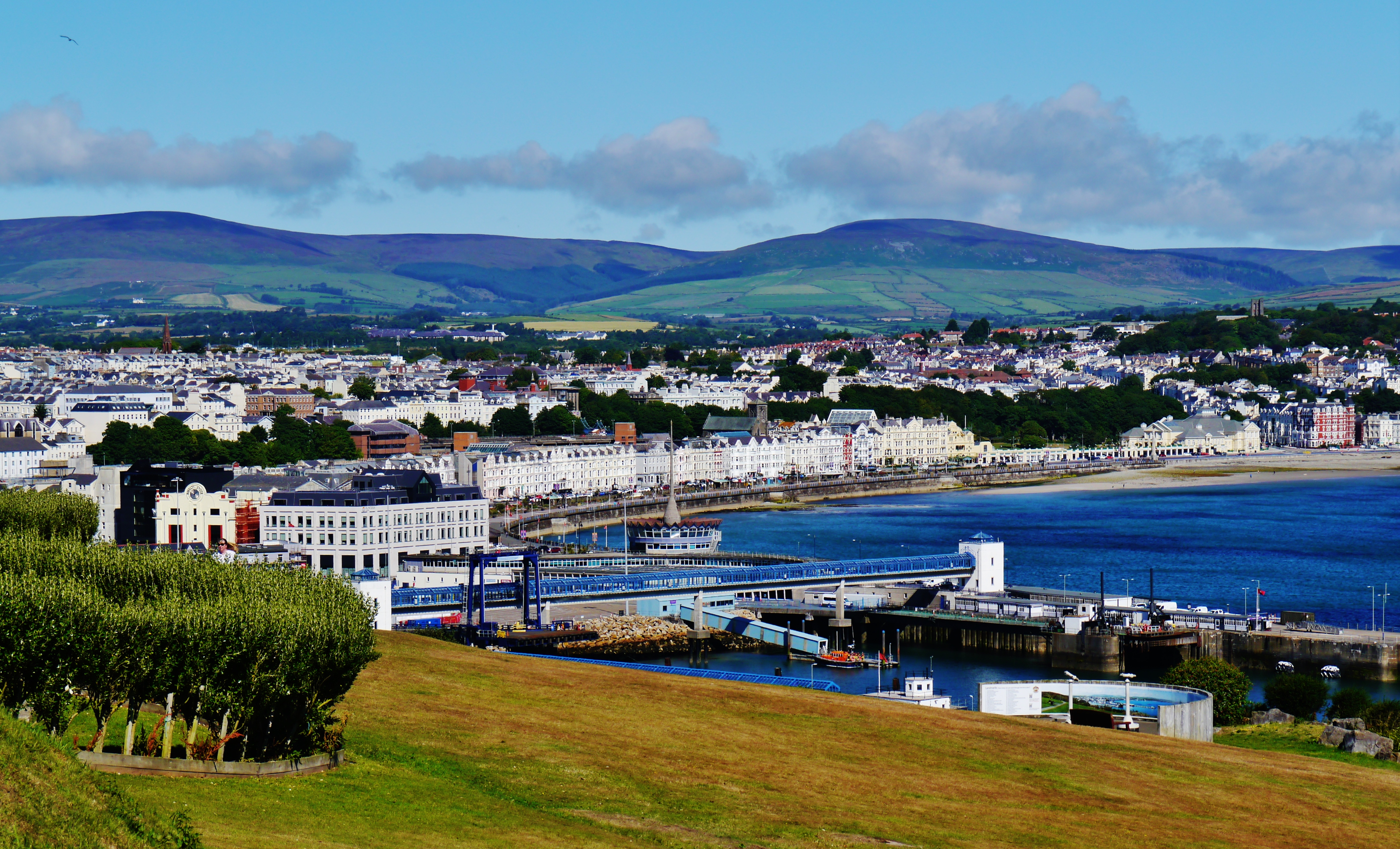
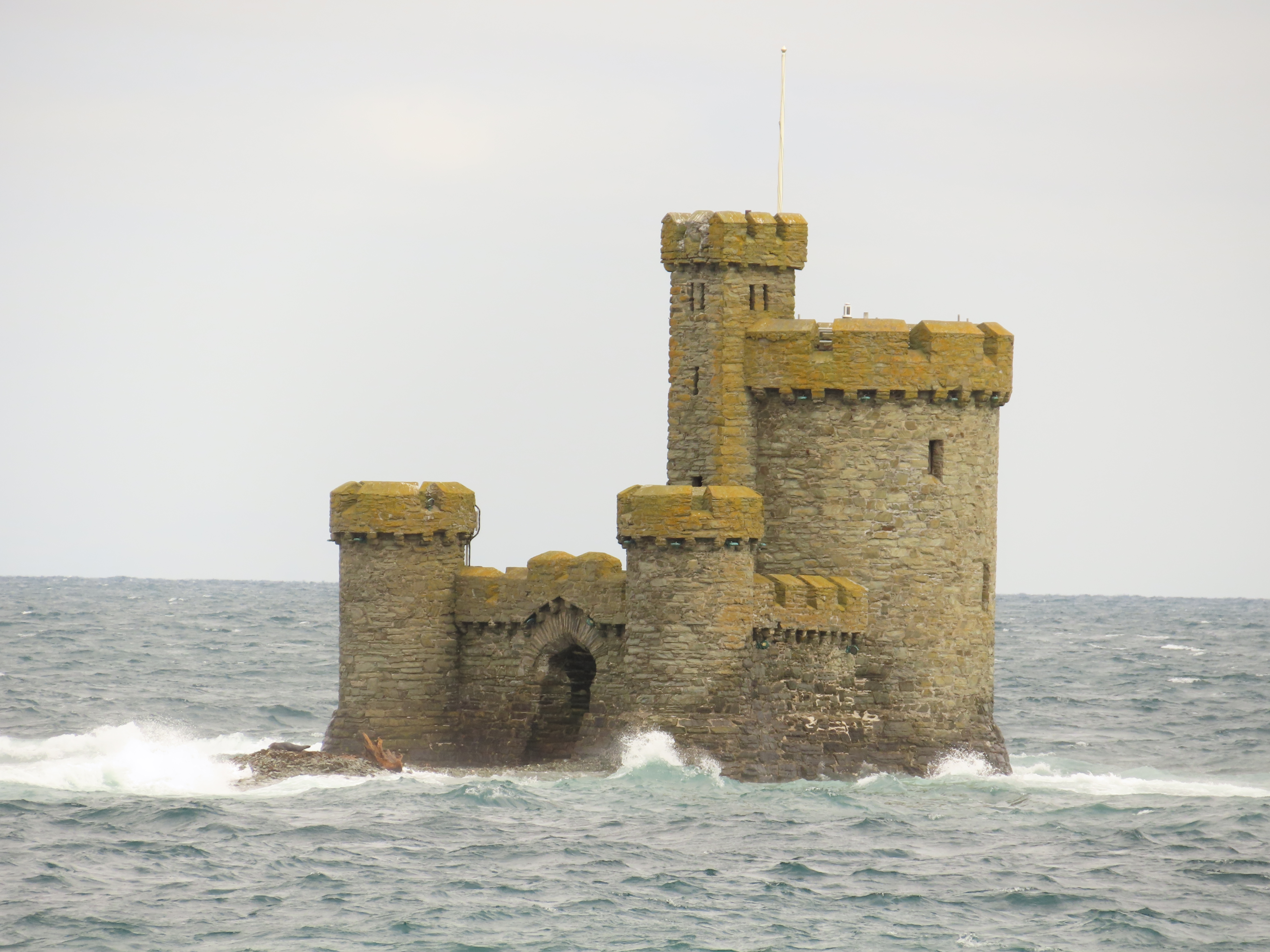
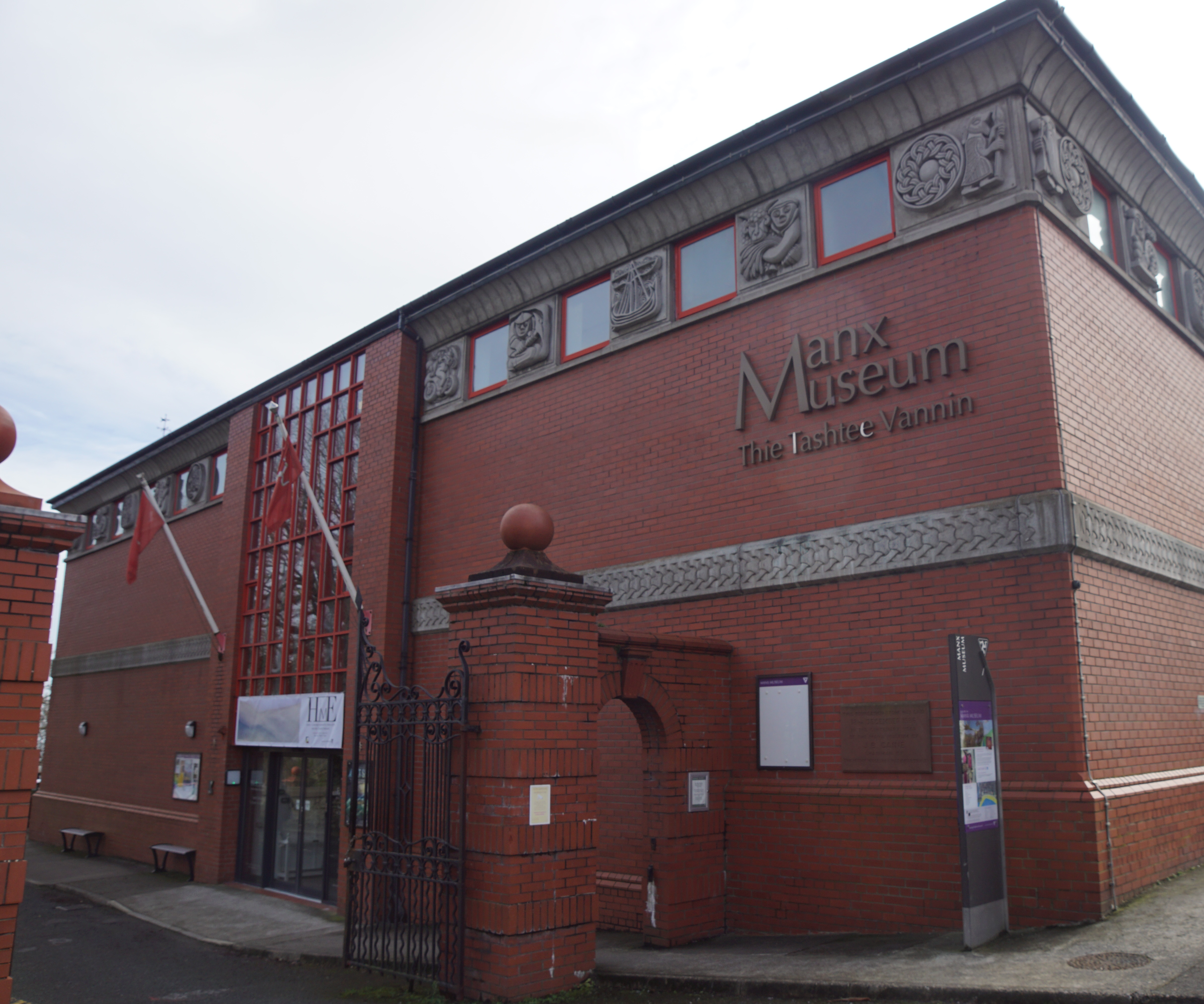
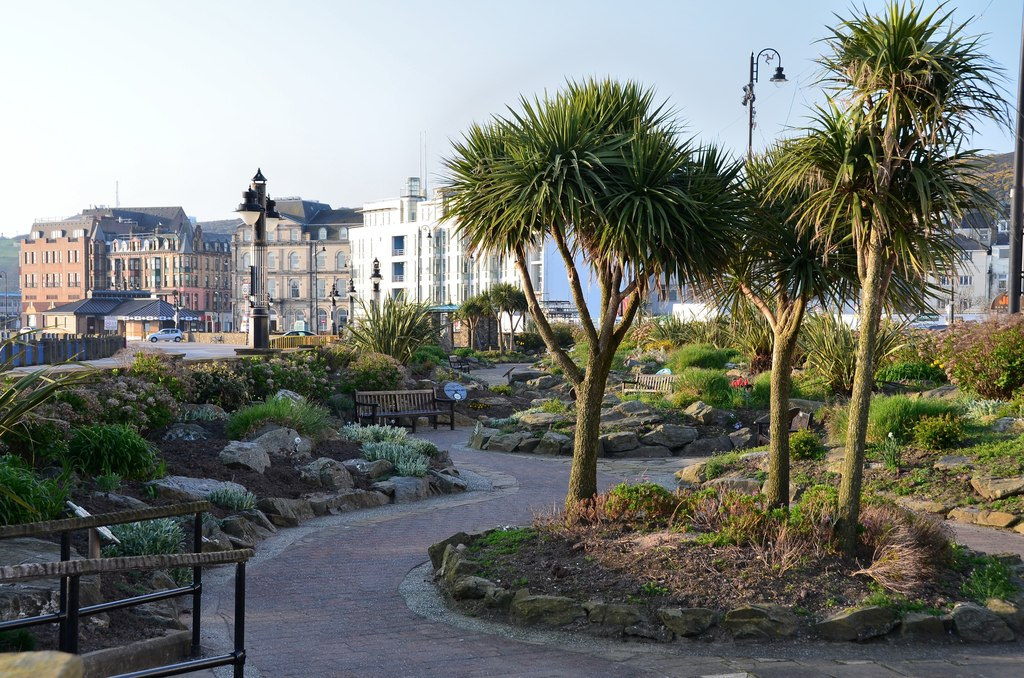
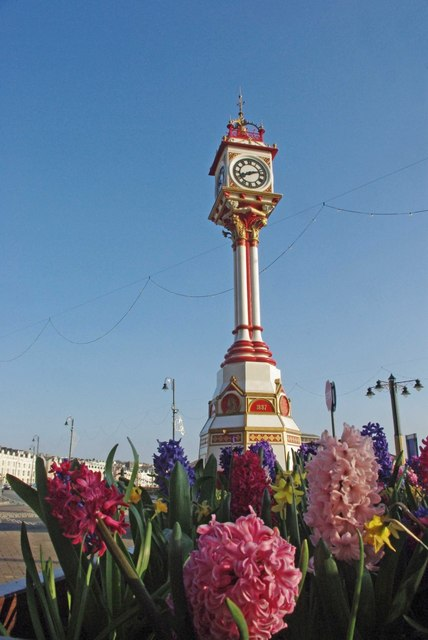
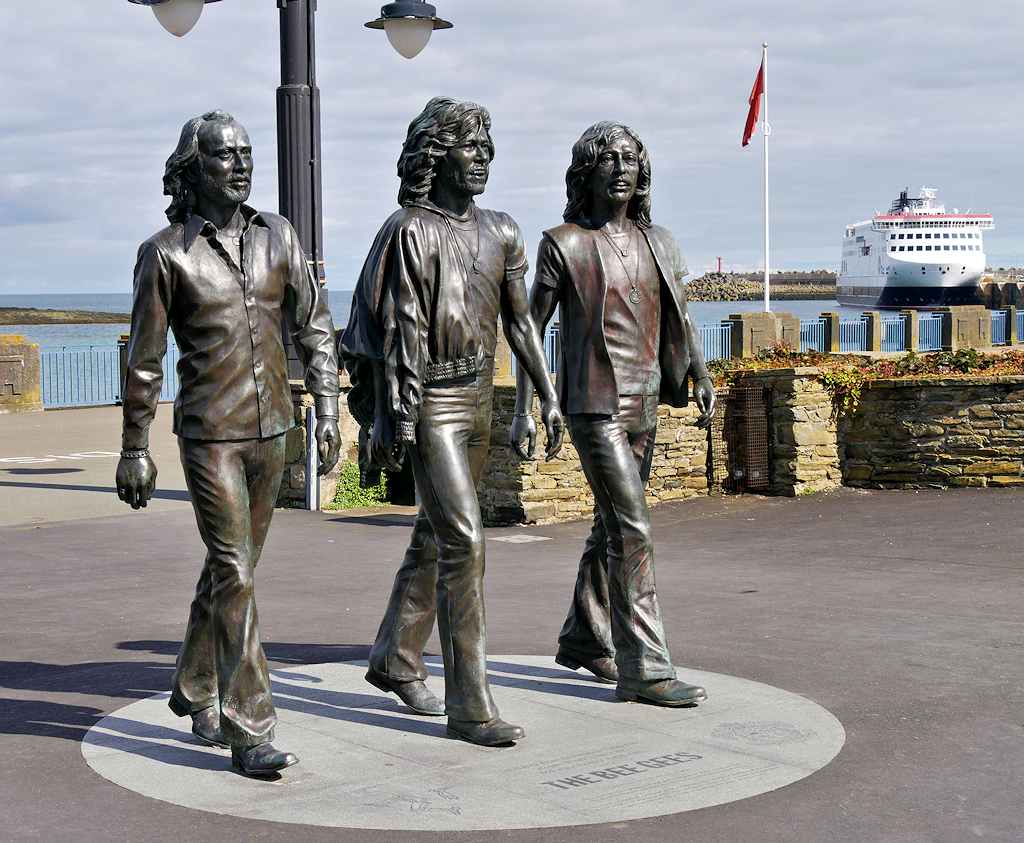
- Top: Douglas skyline, Middle: Tower of Refuge, Manx Museum, Promenade Gardens Bottom: Jubilee Clock Tower, Bee Gees statue

- Flag

- Location within the Isle of Man
- Area: 4.1 sq mi (11 km^{2})
- Population: 26,677 (2021)
  - Density: 6,506.58/sq mi (2,512.41/km²)
- OS grid reference: SC379750
- Parish: City of Douglas
- Sheading: Middle
- Crown dependency: Isle of Man
- Post town: ISLE OF MAN
- Postcode district: IM1 / IM2
- Dialling code: 01624
- Police: Isle of Man
- Fire: Isle of Man
- Ambulance: Isle of Man
- House of Keys: Douglas North; Douglas East; Douglas South; Douglas West
- Website: www.douglas.gov.im

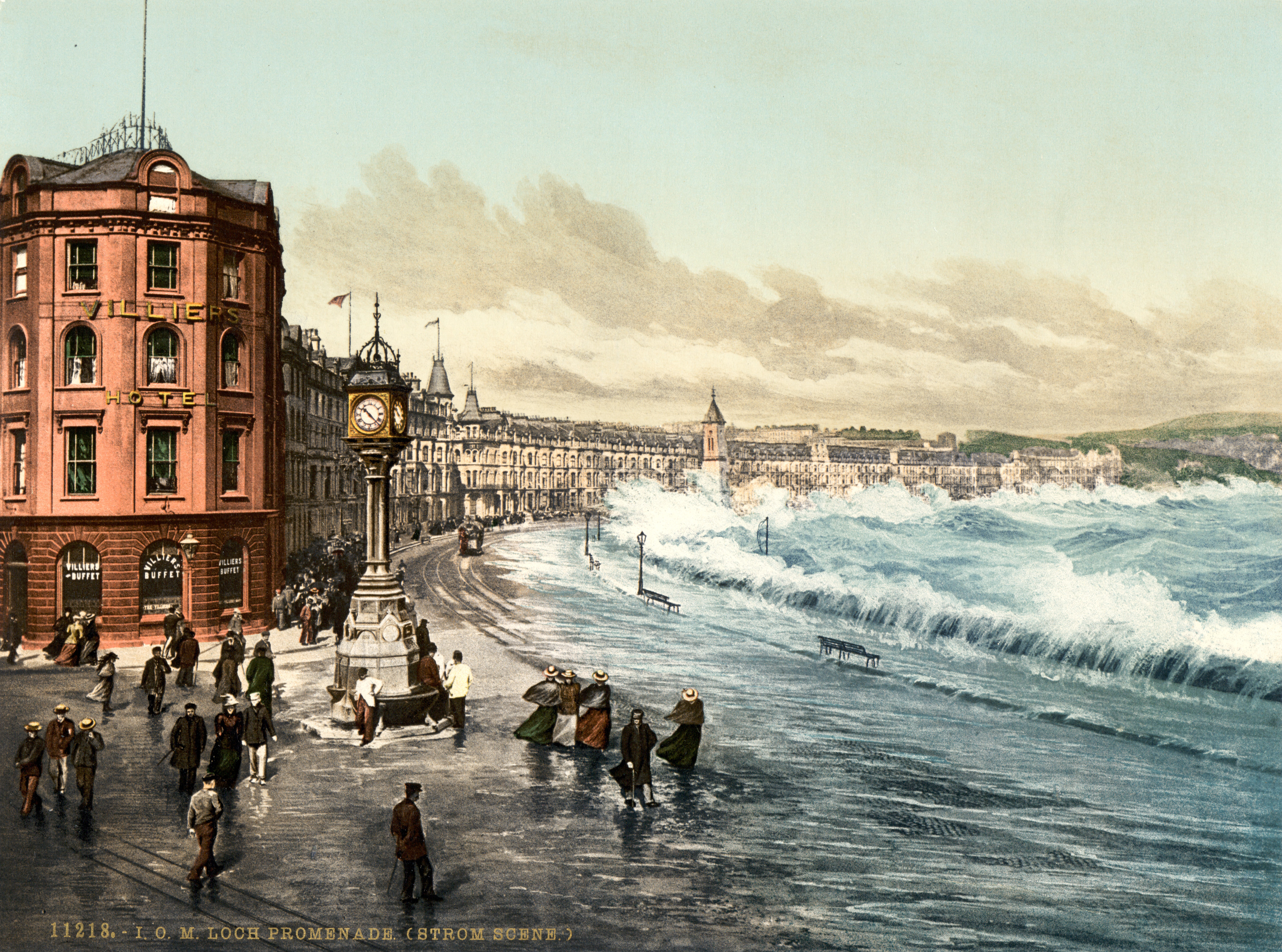
Photochrom of Loch Promenade during a storm, 1890s

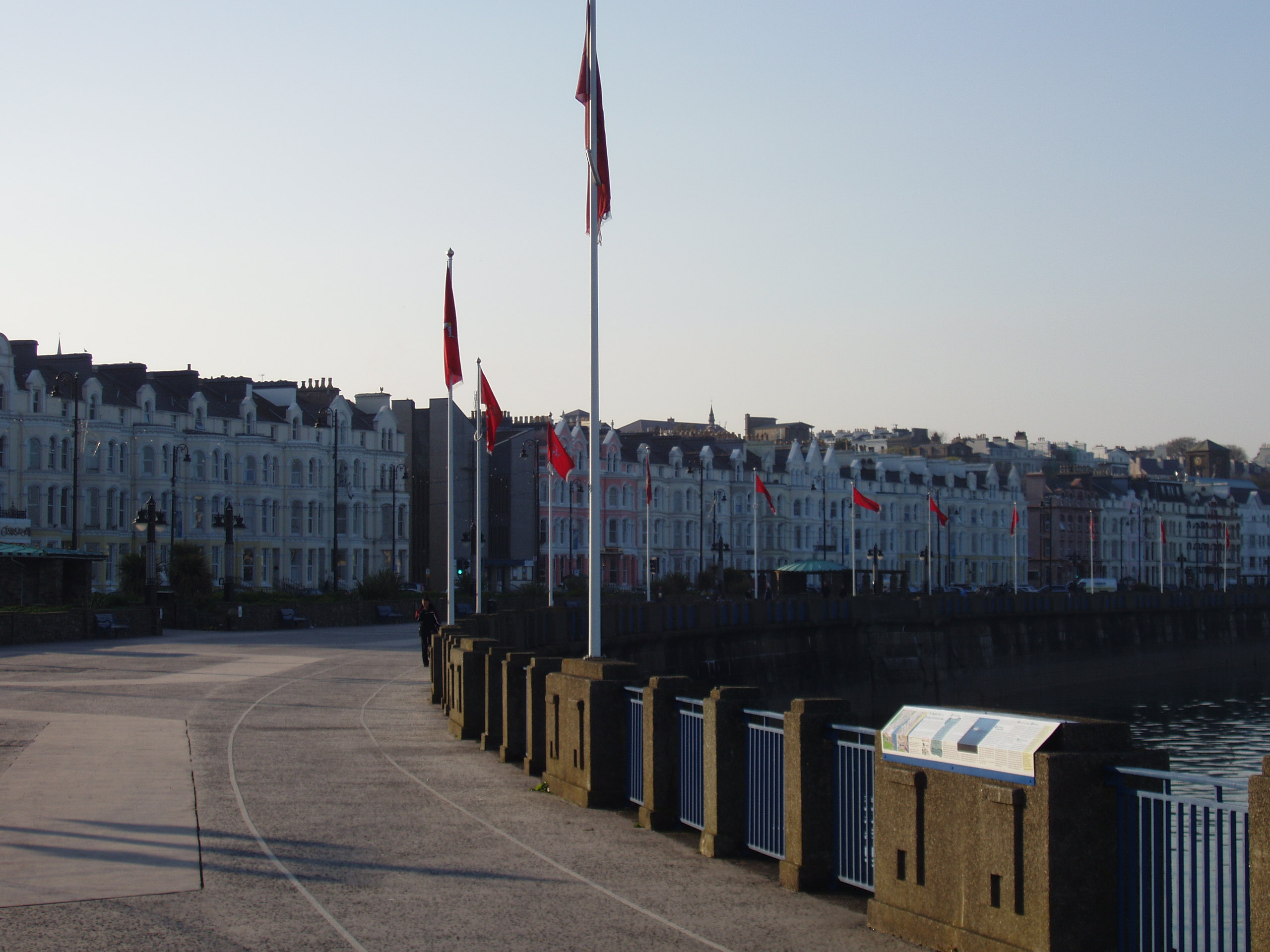
Douglas Promenade, which runs nearly the entire length of beachfront in Douglas

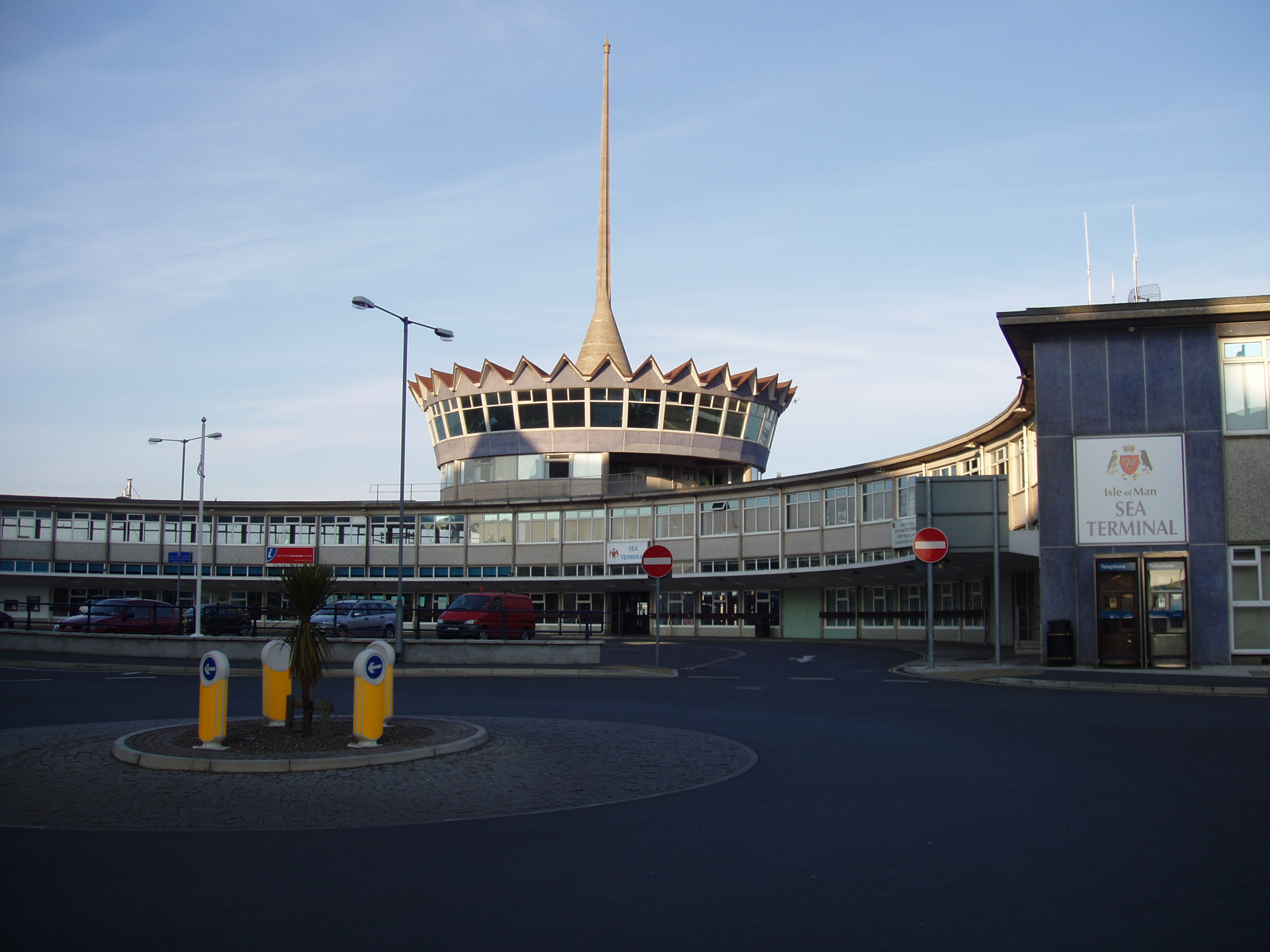
Sea terminal in Douglas

Douglas (Manx: Doolish, pronounced [ˈdðuːlʲəʃ]) is a port city and the capital of the Isle of Man, situated on the Douglas Bay, near the Irish Sea. It is located at the mouth of the River Douglas, and on a sweeping bay of two miles (three kilometres). The River Douglas forms part of the city's harbour and main commercial port.

Douglas was a small settlement until it grew rapidly as a result of links with the English port of Liverpool in the 18th century. Further population growth came in the following century, resulting during the 1860s in a staged transfer of the High Courts, the Lieutenant Governor's residence (actually located in nearby Onchan), and finally the seat of the legislature, Tynwald, to Douglas from the ancient capital, Castletown.

With a population of 26,677 in 2021, Douglas is the most-populous settlement on the Isle of Man. It was once the largest town on the island, until it was granted city status in 2022, now making Ramsey the most-populous town on the island. The city is the island's main hub for business, finance, legal services, shipping, transport, shopping, and entertainment. The annual Isle of Man TT motorcycle races start and finish in Douglas.

== Name ==
It is generally agreed that the toponyms of English Douglas and Manx Doolish both come from Proto-Celtic *duboglassio-, where *dubo- (which survives today in Welsh as du and Irish as dubh) meant 'black; deep' and *glassio- (surviving in Welsh glais and Irish glais) meant 'water, river'; thus, it probably meant 'deep river'. The name of the city thus came from a nearby river. It is a common name for place names around the British Isles, related to other toponyms such as Dyfleis, Dulais, Develish, Dawlish, Dowlish and, of course, other settlements named Douglas.

== History ==
=== Early history ===
In the absence of any archaeological data, the origins of the city may be revealed by analysis of the original street and plot pattern. The discovery of a bronze weapon in central Douglas, and the large Ballaquayle Viking treasure hoard on the outskirts (now in the Manx Museum and British Museum, London), both in the 1890s, hint at the early importance of the site now occupied by Douglas. Scholars agree that the name of the city derives from Early Celtic 'Duboglassio' meaning 'black river'. Douglas is twice referred to in the monastic Chronicle of the Kings of Man and the Isles: first in 1190, when the monks of St Mary's Abbey at Rushen were transferred there for a four-year stay; then again in 1313, when Robert the Bruce, King of Scotland, spent the night at the "monastery of Duglas" on his way to seize Castle Rushen. These may be references to the site of the later Nunnery, a little upstream from the port.

The first detailed documentation shows that in 1511 there were only thirteen resident households in the settlement clustered north of the harbour; most of the property there was classified as "chambers" (unoccupied, unheated, single-celled structures) for which rent was paid by non-residents including clergy, officials and landowners from elsewhere on the island. This suggests that the city's nucleus originated as a non-urban port. Speculation links the store buildings with the Irish Sea herring fishery, and the import/export trade.

=== Growth and development ===
In 1681 Thomas Denton described Douglas as "the place of greatest resort" on the Isle of Man, and by 1705 a clear picture of the early town emerges, with hints that its residential, market, and military defence functions were growing in importance alongside the port facility. The town thrived in the next 60 years, as imposing merchants' houses, large warehouses, quays and a pier were built to accommodate the burgeoning "running trade" (smuggling): one of the stimuli for the town's expansion. Other forms of trade also grew, and after the Revestment Act 1765, Douglas began to reap the benefits of transatlantic trade, due in part to co-operation at a local level with Liverpool. Legitimate merchants who rose to prominence over the period included the Murreys, the Moores, and the Bacons. The town's later prosperity was facilitated by the low cost of living, and the favourable legal status enjoyed by English debtors and half-pay officers. The initial growth and development of the ALR owed much to its natural harbour (now the Inner Harbour), since greatly expanded and improved. Over the 18th century, the town's population rose from about 800 in 1710 to nearly 2,500 in 1784.

Throughout the 19th century, the town's demographics followed the same trends as the United Kingdom, due to the Industrial Revolution. The number of holiday visitors grew from the early 19th century, and from around 1870 onwards, the town was transformed into a leading holiday resort. But there were increasingly unsanitary conditions, and poor quality housing; again reflecting a trend seen across the United Kingdom. The open sewage, middens (domestic waste dumps), and smell from the harbour at low tide all contributed to the town's uncleanliness. Oil and gas lamps first appeared in the late 1820s and 1830s, the first hospital to join the Dispensary was built in 1850, and in 1832 the scenic Tower of Refuge was built in Douglas Bay to offer shelter and provisions for sailors awaiting rescue. Douglas in the first half of the 19th century often suffered from the destitution of its population and the many epidemics, in particular cholera.

The rise of Douglas as the social and economic stronghold was recognised in 1869, when it became the home of the island's parliament, Tynwald, and therefore the capital, an honour previously held by Castletown, a smaller town in the south of the island. Douglas's political landscape also changed significantly in the 19th century, in spite of the conservatism of some townsfolk: in 1844, for example, at a public meeting, the idea of a town council was rejected in favour of retaining the system of Town High Bailiffs; when the Town Bill Act was passed at Tynwald in 1852, the people of Douglas again rejected the idea. However, an Act passed later that decade, which did not include opt-out clauses, was accepted, and in 1860, Douglas elected its first town council, which was predominantly middle class in its makeup. The Town Commissioners could tackle the town's problems with greater efficiency, and by 1869 the sewage problem had been largely resolved.

The Commissioners also worked to alter the anachronistic architecture of Douglas, built during the era of fishing and trading, and no longer amenable or safe for tourists. The proportion of the total Manx population living in Douglas was also expanding, with 35% living there by 1891. The Victorian and later modernisation of the town was achieved at the expense of the original maze-like layout of the oldest streets. These were cleared away in the new street schemes and slum clearances of the 1870s to 1920s. The town's infrastructure was radically altered for tourists' convenience, and in 1878 the Loch Promenade was constructed. In 1870, there were 60,000 visitors annually; by 1884, this had grown to 182,000. In 1887, 310,916 visited for Queen Victoria's Golden Jubilee.

=== Seafaring links ===
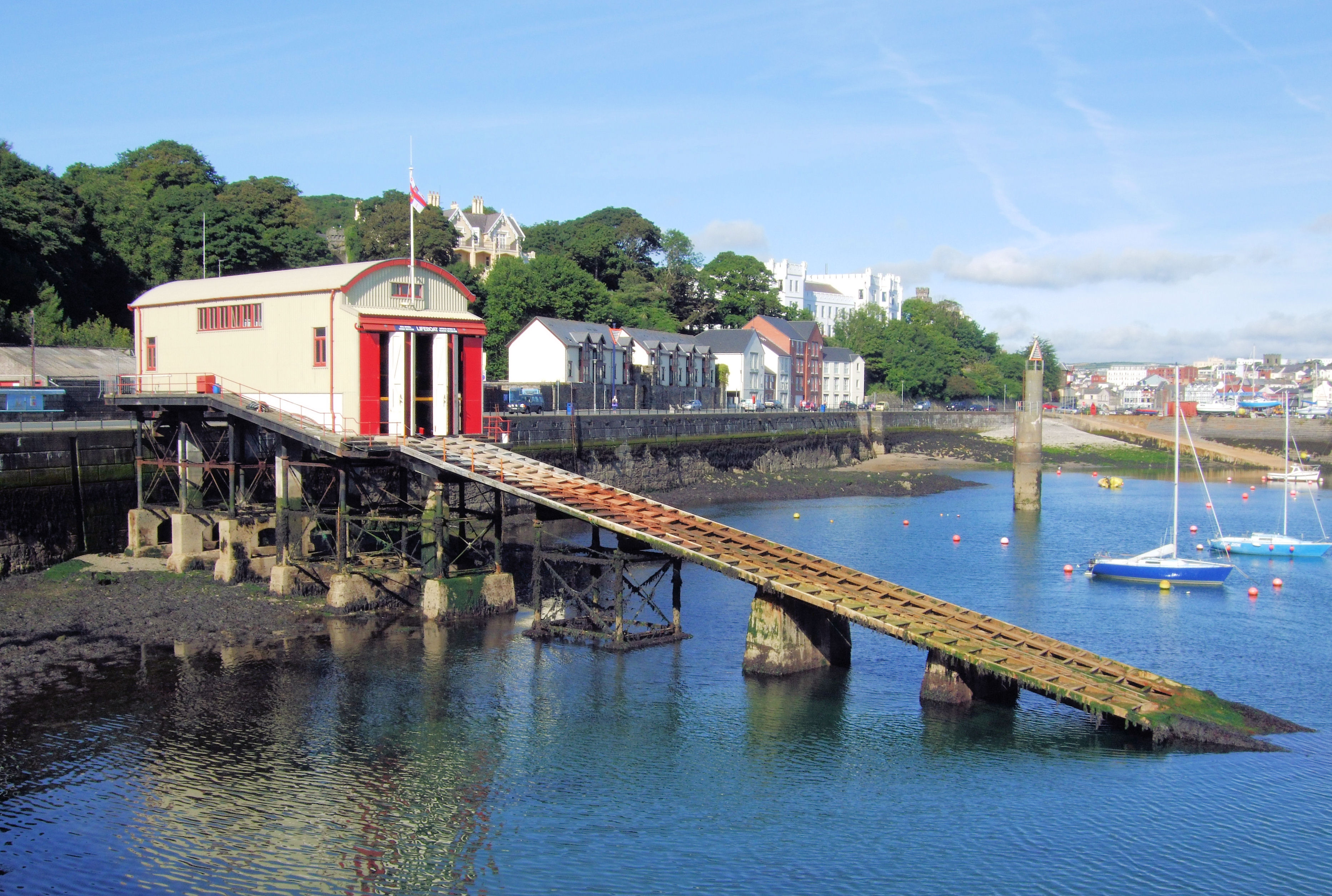
Douglas Lifeboat Station

The earliest organised ferry services emerged between Douglas and Whitehaven, established by William Nicholson in the 1750s. More formally, Nicholson's Packet Service began in 1765 or 1766, and the Post Office mail contract was secured by 1782. Sailings were irregular and heavily dependent on weather conditions. Steamer services brought a considerable improvement; the first regular link (en route between Greenock and Liverpool) was available from 1819. The formation of what became the Isle of Man Steam Packet Company in 1830 led to greatly improved services, and also laid the foundations for growth in both cargo and tourist traffic.

The Royal National Lifeboat Institution (RNLI) has a lifeboat station at Douglas. The first lifeboat station in the port was established in 1802. In 1825 it was one of the first lifeboat stations to be provided with a purpose-built lifeboat; this was at the request of Sir William Hillary, the founder of the Institution. It was not operational between 1851 and 1868, and it closed in 1895. The station, established in 1874, operates the Tyne-class lifeboat Sir William Hillary. There are three memorials to Sir William in Douglas: one in St George's Church where he was buried in 1847, one on Loch Promenade, and the other on Douglas Head near where he established the Tower of Refuge in 1832.

=== Recent history ===
During the First and Second World Wars, some parts of Douglas and elsewhere in the Isle of Man were home to internment camps for "enemy aliens". Douglas held seven out of the ten internment camps on the island during World War II, including: Hutchinson, Metropole, Central, Palace, Granville and Sefton Camp. Sections of the Promenade were cordoned off and many guest houses were used for the purpose. The war dead of the island are commemorated on the Douglas War Memorial.

Douglas is now the main home of the island's offshore financial services industry, and also of the main shopping centre.

The city was the birthplace of brothers Maurice, Robin and Barry Gibb, members of the Bee Gees.

Douglas was home to the Summerland leisure centre, which suffered a catastrophic fire in 1973.

In 2011 Douglas hosted the Commonwealth Youth Games.

On 20 May 2022, it was announced that, as part of the Platinum Jubilee Civic Honours, Douglas would receive city status by Letters Patent sometime later in 2022. The letters patent was expected to be effective from 1 November 2022, although there were some reports in November 2022 that it was somehow delayed following the death of Queen Elizabeth II, to an unknown date. A council meeting was said to discuss the issue in February 2023, but it was not discussed. Queen Camilla presented Letters Patent conferring city status on 20 March 2024.

== Geography ==
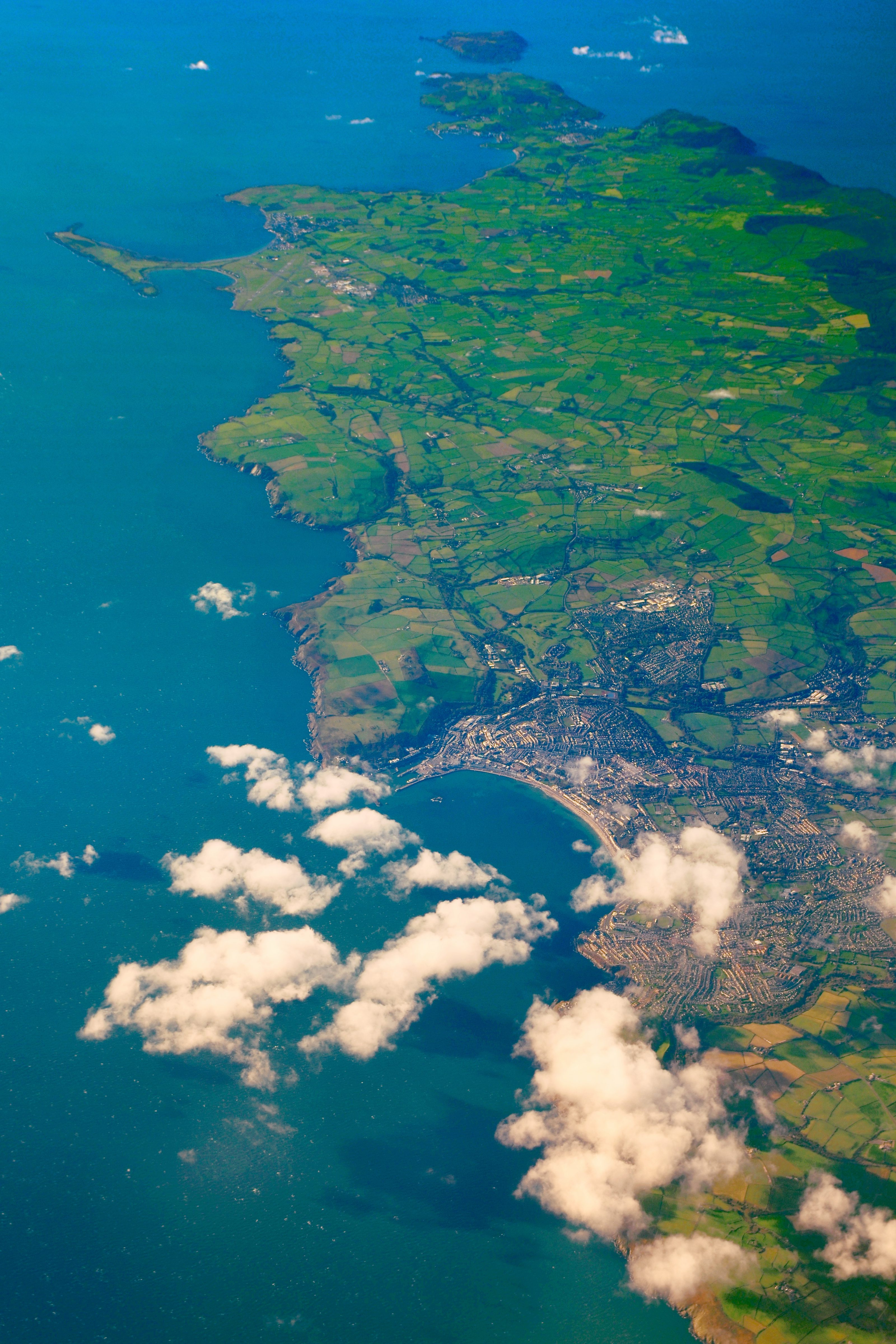
Aerial view of Douglas and the southern half of the Isle of Man

Douglas is on the east of the island near the confluence of the two rivers Dhoo and Glass forming the Douglas. At Douglas, the river flows through the quay and into Douglas Bay. A gently sloping valley runs inland and there are hills around the city. The city is surrounded by several villages, most notably Onchan to the north-east (which forms a conurbation with Douglas) and Union Mills to the west.

=== Climate ===
The weather reporting station closest to Douglas is the coastal weather station at Ronaldsway, about 7 miles (11 km) south-west of Douglas. The highest temperature recorded in Ronaldsway stands at 28.9 °C (84.0 °F), recorded in July 1983. On average, a temperature of 25 °C (77 °F) or more is recorded 0.8 days per year at Ronaldsway (1981–2010) and on average the highest temperature of the year is 24.1 °C (75.4 °F).

On average, 14.5 days of air frost per year were recorded at Ronaldsway in the period 1981–2010. The lowest temperature recorded in Ronaldsway is −9.1 °C (15.6 °F), recorded in December 1961. For the period of 1981–2010, the lowest temperature of the year was −3.4 °C (25.9 °F) on average.

== Demography ==
The Isle of Man census 2021 lists the population of Douglas as 26,677, a reduction from the 2011 population of 27,938. The 2001 census gave a population of 25,347. The city has 31.73% of the island's total population of 84,069.

== Governance ==
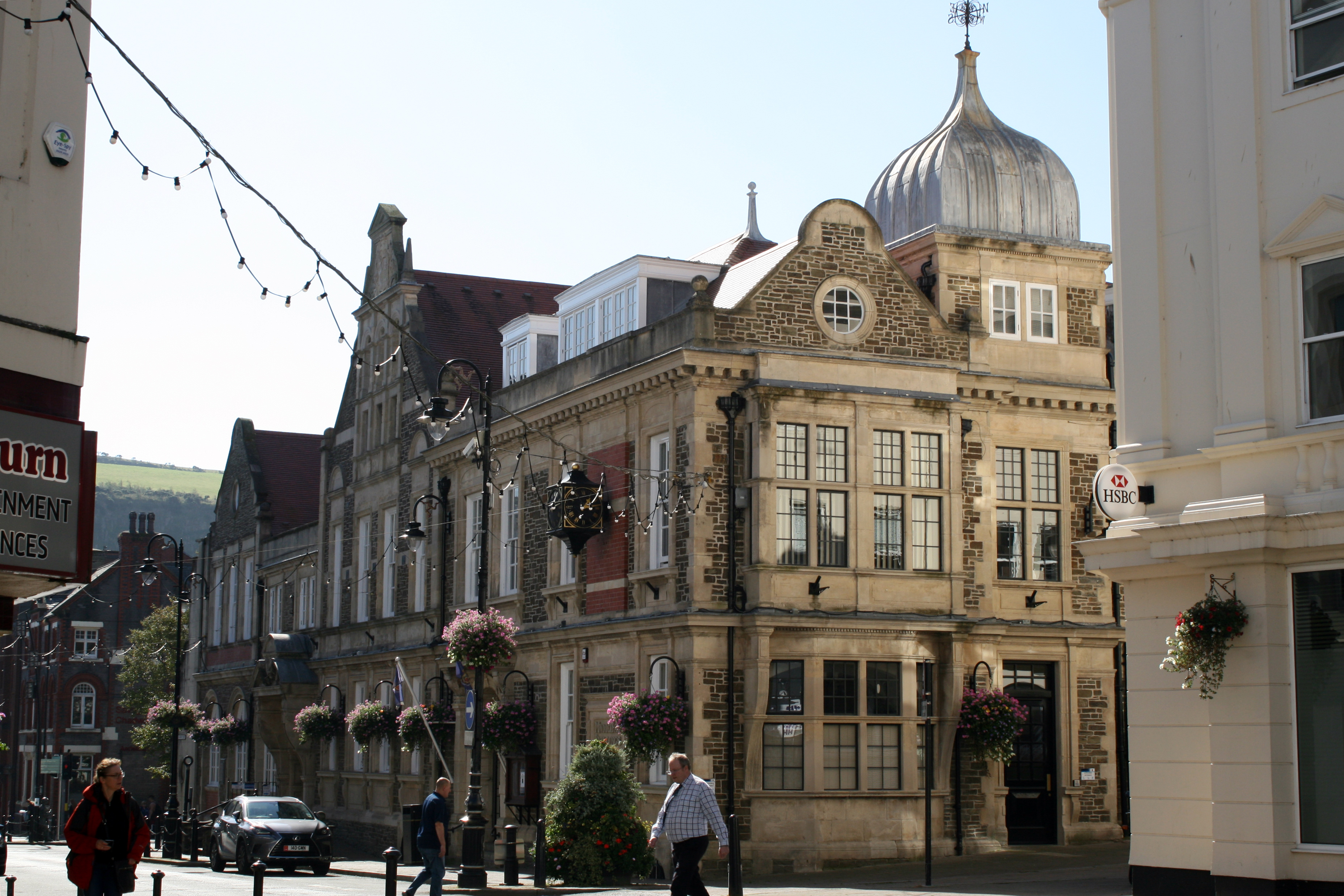
Douglas City Hall

Douglas elects eight members of the House of Keys: two each from four constituencies (Central, East, South and North). The House of Keys is the lower house of Tynwald, the Manx parliament. The local authority responsible for the running of services is Douglas City Council (formerly Douglas Borough Council), which has 12 elected councillors. It is based at Douglas City Hall.

== Transport ==
Douglas is the hub of the island's bus network, with frequent services to Port Erin, Peel and Ramsey, as well as various more local bus services. The city also has the termini of the two main railway lines on the island: the steam railway to Port Erin and the electric tramway to Ramsey. It is also the home of the ferry terminal, from where the Isle of Man Steam Packet Company operates regular services to Heysham and to Liverpool and occasional services to Dublin and to Belfast.

== Media ==
The Isle of Man's three main radio stations Manx Radio, Energy FM and 3FM are all based in Douglas.

Local TV coverage is served by BBC North West Tonight on BBC One and ITV Granada Reports on ITV1.

The city is served by three local newspapers: the Isle of Man Examiner, the Isle of Man Courier and the Manx Independent.

== Education ==
References to education in Douglas begin in the late 17th century, with mention of the schoolmastership, usually combined with the Chaplaincy of Douglas, and reference to a "petty school" in 1675. William Walker (1679–1729) was appointed to the mastership in 1700; school was probably kept in the old Chapel, in later Heywood Place.) Walker was later preferred as Rector of Ballaugh, and received an honorary Doctorate. He is now remembered in his mother's Manx Gaelic lament on her sons: "Illiam Walker as Robin Tear".

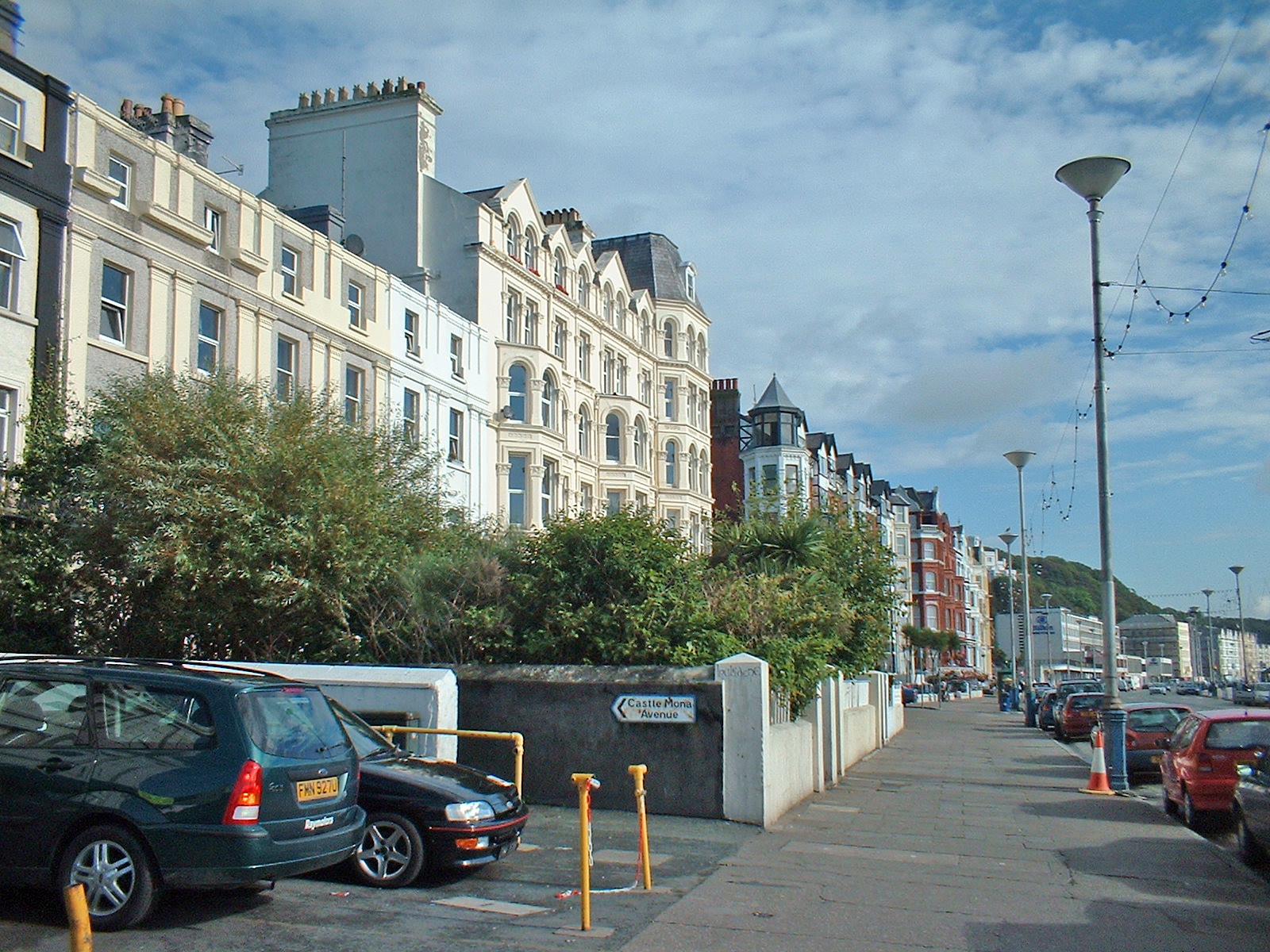
Seafront, Douglas

The more formal history of education in the city begins with Bishop Thomas Wilson's establishment of the Douglas Grammar School. Alderman William Dixon (a native of Douglas, but resident in Dublin since at least the 1680s) agreed to hand over his parents' former home, and passed over the New Bond Street property in 1714. The Bishop raised an endowment of £500 (Irish currency), half being funded by the Barrow Trustees, most of the balance being provided by the Bishop's Douglas relatives, the Murrey family. Even after this, the mastership of Douglas Grammar School continued to be combined with the Chaplaincy, now of the new Chapel of St Matthew. Details of the building of the original Grammar School are sparse, but it seems that William Murrey was deeply involved, retaining the use of the capacious storage vault under the school in lieu of repayment of £150 costs.

Another notable Master of the Grammar School was Rev. Philip Moore (1705–1783) who was a native of the city, his father Robert Moore having been one of the "Undertakers" who organised the construction of St Matthews, and his mother Miss Katherine Kelly. Moore was appointed Master in 1735, and was reckoned to be a good classical scholar, and have "an inherent love of teaching".

Today, Douglas has two high schools (Ballakermeen High School and St. Ninian's High School), and numerous primary schools. University College Isle of Man and the International Business School are also located in Douglas.

== Landmarks ==
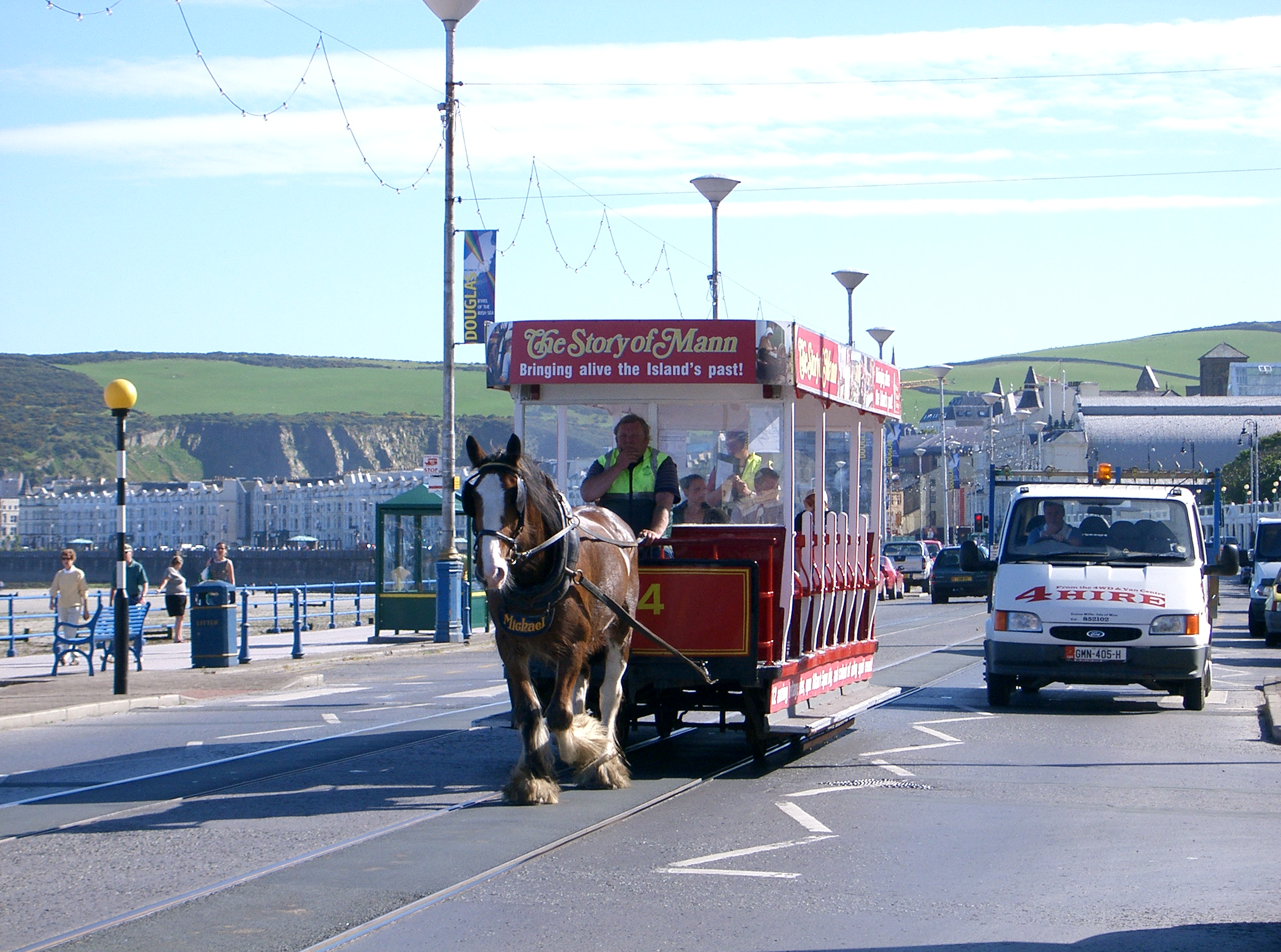
A horse tram passes a pedestrian crossing on Douglas promenade

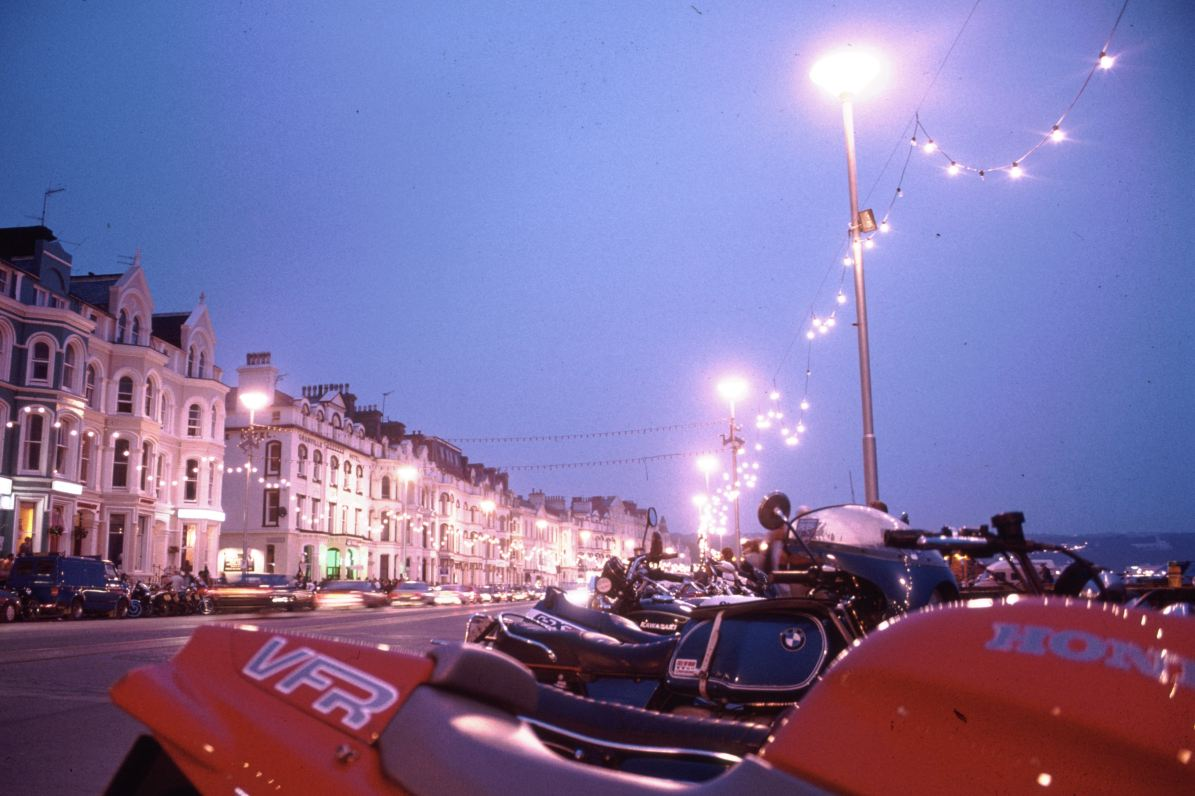
Douglas during the 1992 TT Races

Douglas has a number of attractions and items of interest:

- The Tower of Refuge is a small castle-like shelter built upon Conister Rock in Douglas Bay as a sanctuary for shipwrecked sailors. Construction was instigated by Sir William Hillary, founder of the RNLI.
- Douglas Head is home to the Great Union Camera Obscura which has recently undergone restoration and is open to the public during the summer months. Other artefacts and remnants of Victorian Tourism can still be found on walks around the area.
- The horse-drawn trams that run along the promenade from the Villa Marina to the Manx Electric Railway station from spring to early autumn.
- Steam trains run 15 miles from Douglas railway station to Port Erin in the south of the island.
- The Grandstand on Glencrutchery Road marks the start and finish of the annual TT Races and various other motorsports.
- The Gaiety Theatre and the Villa Marina are popular venues for all manner of stage acts: from rock music to comedy to drama to ballet. The Gaiety Theatre is one of the best surviving examples of the work of Frank Matcham and dates from 1900. Both venues have recently undergone extensive renovations.
- The award-winning Manx Museum in Kingswood Grove contains many of the most important cultural artefacts relating to the Manx nation. Highlights include the Calf of Man Crucifixion Stone, the Pagan Lady's necklace from the Viking excavations at Peel Castle, and the largest collection of Archibald Knox materials. It also houses the National Art Collection, and the National Archives.
- The Jubilee clock is a street clock built in 1887 to mark the Golden Jubilee of Queen Victoria's reign. It is located at the foot of Victoria Street at its junction with Loch Promenade. The location also marked the lower terminus of the Upper Douglas Cable Tramway.
- Other buildings of interest include Isola restaurant, in John Street, and the Douglas Hotel, on the North Quay, both merchants' houses from the mid-18th century; the Castle Mona (formerly the Quality Hotel), a seaside mansion built by John Murray, 4th Duke of Atholl in 1804, awaiting refurbishment; and the Loch Promenade, a curving terrace of former boarding houses dating from the 1870s.

Douglas saw the first architectural essays of the Arts and Crafts architect Baillie Scott.

- The breakwater extension was built outside the existing smaller one, which carried a rail-mounted crane. It was completed in 1983 and opened by Princess Alexandra.
- The Sunken Gardens on Loch Promenade were created as a result of the widening of the promenade at the turn of the 20th century. A construction line was installed for this task.

== Sport ==
Douglas is the start and finish point for the Isle of Man TT. The race had been a part of the FIM Motorcycle Grand Prix World Championship but lost its status when a new British motorcycle Grand Prix was established in 1977.

The Isle of Man Cricket Club was formed in 1930 and later reformed as the IoM Cricket Association. It was elected a member of the International Cricket Council in 2004.

The National Sports Centre (NSC), is a large multi-sports centre and athletics stadium located on Pulrose Road. Owned by the Department of Tourism and Leisure it is operated by Manx Sport & Recreation. The King George V Bowl, a multi-use stadium located on Pulrose Road is owned by Douglas Borough Council.

A free Parkrun takes place in Nobles Park, St. Ninian's Road every Saturday.

Douglas is home to eight of the seventeen football clubs that compete in the Isle of Man Football League:

| Club | Home ground |
|---|---|
| Corinthians A.F.C. | Nobles Park |
| Douglas and District F.C. | Groves Road, Pulrose |
| Douglas Royal F.C. | National Sports Centre, Groves Road |
| Gymnasium F.C. | Tromode Park, Tromode Road |
| Police A.F.C. | Groves Road, Pulrose (shared) |
| Pulrose United A.F.C. | Groves Road, Pulrose (shared) |
| St Georges A.F.C. | Glencrutchery Road |
| St Marys A.F.C. | The Bowl, Pulrose Road |

Douglas Rugby Club and Vagabonds Rugby Club are based in the city. Their 1st teams play in the English competitions and reserve teams play in the Manx Rugby competition.

== Notable people ==
=== Science and technology ===
- Professor Edward Forbes FRS, FGS (1815 in Douglas – 1854 in Edinburgh) a Manx naturalist
- Martin R. Bridson FRS (1964 Douglas) Manx mathematician
- David W. Lewis, mathematician known for his contributions to quadratic forms theory
- Gordon Manley FRGS (1902 in Douglas – 1980) an English climatologist
- Dorothy Pantin (1896–1985) the first woman doctor and surgeon of the Isle of Man
- Derek Charles Robinson FRS (1941 in Douglas – 2002 in Oxford) a physicist who worked in the UK fusion power programme

=== Public service and commerce ===
- Commander Robert Benjamin Young, RN (1773 in Douglas – 1846 in Exeter) an officer in the Royal Navy, he observed the battle of Trafalgar in 1805 from the deck of HMS Entreprenante
- Arthur Forbes, 9th Laird of Culloden DL FRSE (1819 in Douglas – 1879 in Aldershot) a noted Scottish landowner and amateur botanist. He was Deputy Lieutenant of Nairn and Ross
- Thomas Edward Brown (1830 in Douglas – 1897) a scholar, teacher, poet and theologian
- Lawrence Adamson, CMG, (1860 in Douglas – 1932) a schoolmaster of Wesley College, Melbourne, Australia.
- Admiral Sir Thomas Hugh Binney KCB KCMG DSO (1883 in Douglas – 1953 in Colchester) a senior officer in the Royal Navy and Governor of Tasmania from 1945 to 1951
- Sidney Nowell Rostron (1883 in Douglas – 1948) a Church of England priest, theologian, and academic. He was the first Principal of St John's College, Durham, 1909 to 1911
- Bertram Kelly (1884 in Douglas – 1976) brought electricity to the Island
- Chris Killip (born 1946 in Douglas) a Manx photographer who has worked at Harvard University in Cambridge, Massachusetts since 1991, where he is a professor of visual and environmental studies
- Angela Little (born 1949 in Douglas) Professor Emerita at the Institute of Education, University of London works in primary education policy and practice in developing countries
- Phil Gawne BSc (born 1965 in Douglas) a former Member of the House of Keys and Minister of Agriculture, Fisheries and Forestry

=== The arts ===
- William Clucas Kinley (1866–1920), Manx playwright and journalist
- Otto Schwarz (1876–1961), travelling bandleader from Germany, who was interned in the prisoner of war camp at Douglas in 1914–1918.
- Harry Korris (1891–1971) a British comedian and actor, star of the hit BBC radio show Happidrome and starred in the 1943 film version
- William Thomas Quirk (1908–1977), Manx poet, composer, and teacher
- Toni Onley OC (1928–2004) a Manx painter noted for his landscapes and abstract works, he moved to Canada in 1948 and lived in Brantford, Ontario
- Bryan Kneale RA (born 1930) a Manx artist and sculptor, described by BBC News Online as "one of the Isle of Man's best known artists."
- Margaret Curphey (1938–2024), British soprano
- Sir Barry Gibb, CBE (born 1946) a British singer, songwriter and record producer who is the last living member of The Bee Gees
- Maurice Gibb, CBE (1949–2003) a British singer, songwriter, multi-instrumentalist and record producer who achieved fame as a member of the Bee Gees
- Robin Gibb CBE (1949–2012) a British singer, songwriter and record producer, who gained worldwide fame as a member of the Bee Gees
- Francis Magee (born 1959 in Dublin) an Irish-Manx actor, best known for his portrayal of Liam Tyler in the long-running British soap opera EastEnders from 1993 to 1995; raised on the Isle of Man
- Jamie Blackley (born 1991) a British actor, known for his role as Adam Wilde in the film If I Stay
- Amy Jackson (born 1992) a Manx-born, Liverpool raised actress, who appears in Indian movies
- Joe Locke (born 2003) a Manx actor, best known for his portrayal of Charlie Spring in the Netflix series Heartstopper

=== Sport ===
- Dave Moore (born 1966), Motorsport commentator
- Tim Kneale (born 1982 in Douglas) a Manx sport shooter who specializes in the double trap
- Mark Cavendish (born 1985 in Douglas) a Manx professional road racing cyclist
- Conor Cummins (born 1986 in Douglas) a Manx motorcycle road racer
- Kieran Tierney (born 1997 in Douglas) a Manx-born, Scottish international footballer. He plays for Celtic F.C..
- Adam Long (born 2000 in Douglas) a Manx professional footballer

== Panoramas of Douglas ==
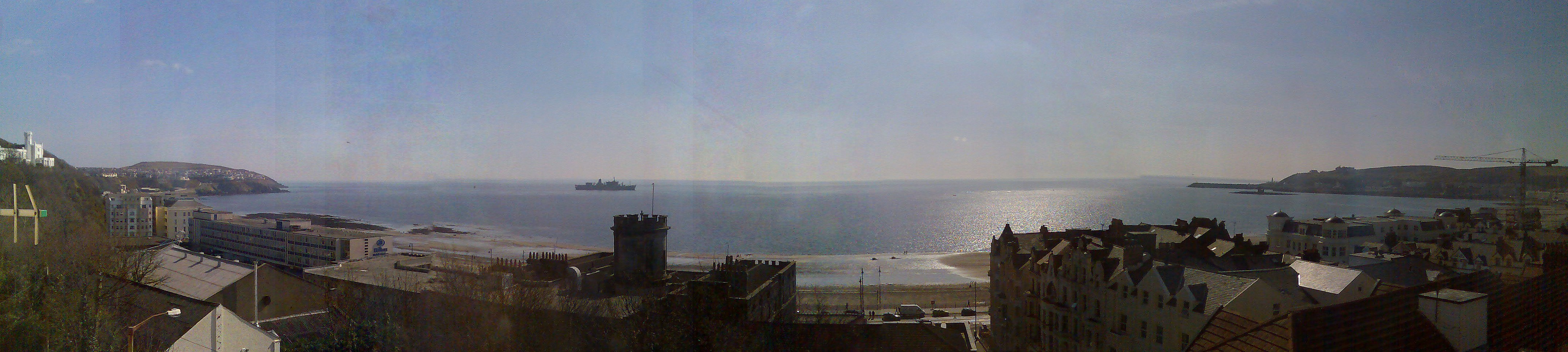
View of the bay showing visible landmarks of the Castle Mona hotel staircase turret (centre) and Onchan Head to left

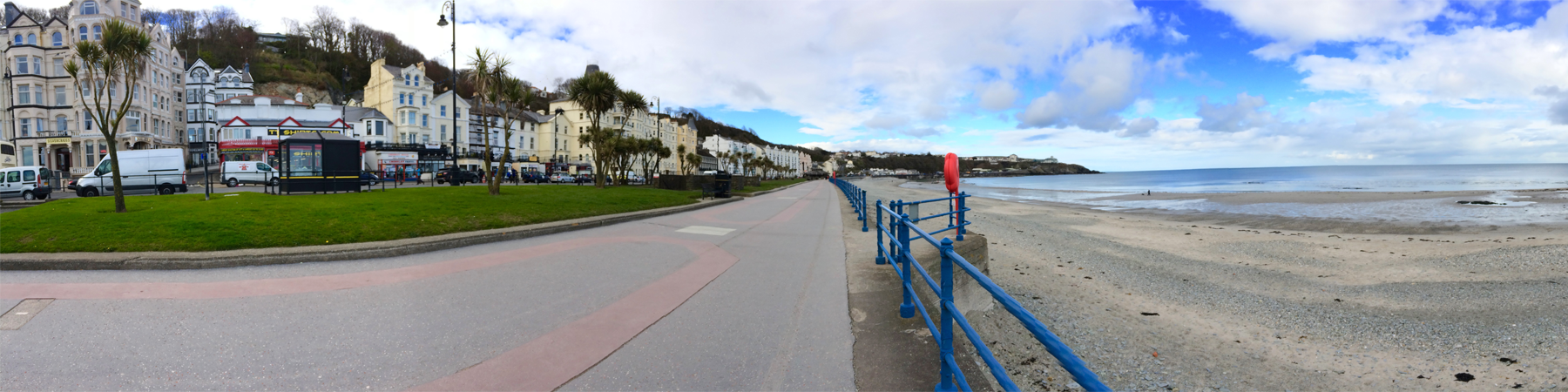
Douglas promenade with Onchan Head in distance
