= Nature Relationship Index =

The Nature Relationship Index (NRI) is under development by the Leverhulme Centre for Nature Recovery, (the LCNR - part of the Environmental Change Institute) in association with the United Nation Human Development Report (HDR) Organization as an adjunct to the widely used Gross Domestic Product (GDP) and the Human Development Index. The latter was introduced in 1990.

== Objective ==
The objective of the NRI is to initiate a narrative in which humanity is only a small part of the reality of global nature. The project suggests that, currently nations, industries, and commerces tend consider the exploitation of the planetary resources as individual short-term supply channels problems related only to particular consumables in isolation. The NRI hopes to widen the current GDP/HDR indices as part of an overall narrative of strategic maintenance supporting both human development and planetary prosperity in terms of diversity and accessibility of natural reserves.

The conceptual foundations of the NRI were first outlined in the journal Nature in 2025.

== Main questions ==
Yadvinder Malhi, director of the Leverhume Centre for Nature Recovery, reports on a seminal workshop held at Hangzhou China which identified three cardinal dimensions:

- Is nature is thriving within a society and accessible to its people?
- Is the society indexed treating its local natural surroundings with due care and consideration?
- Are particular national, industrial and commercial regulations apt to safeguard the whole of the natural environment world-wide for its long-term conservation and future prosperity?
