= Douglas City Council =

Type
- Type: Unitary Authority

Leadership
- Mayor of Douglas: Steven Robert Crellin, JP
- Leader of the Council: Devon Watson

Structure
- Seats: 12 councillors
- Political groups: Independents (8); Manx Labour (3); Green (1)

Elections
- Voting system: Multiple non-transferable vote
- Last election: 22 July 2021
- Next election: 25 April 2025

Meeting place
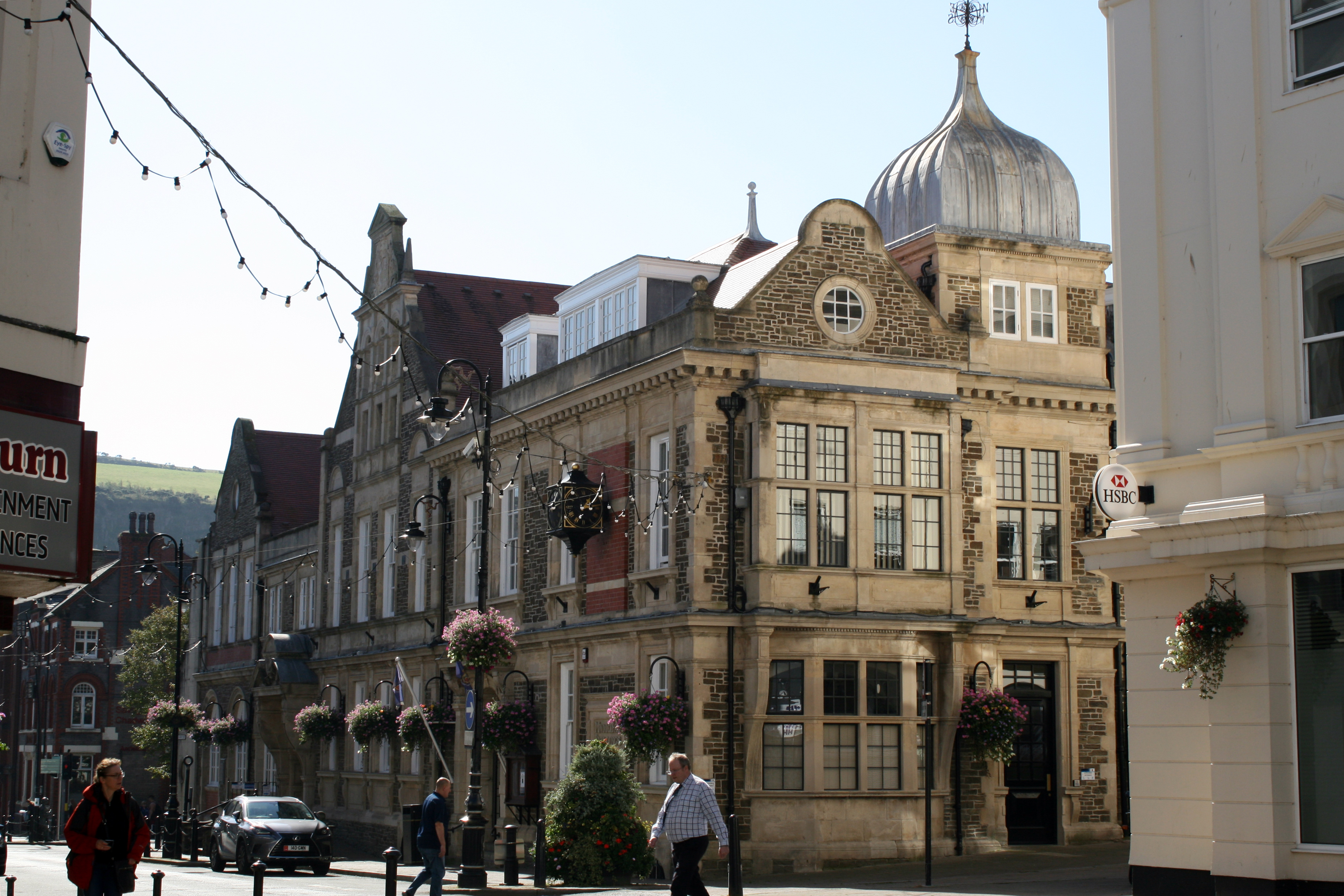
- Douglas City Hall, Douglas

Website
- www.douglas.gov.im

The Douglas City Council is the local elected authority for Douglas, the capital city of the Isle of Man and one of the 17 parishes that run local services on the island (however, it is the only authority with the "City" status). It is the largest local authority, with 12 elected councillors representing the city.

== History ==
Throughout the 18th century the settlement of Douglas had grown rapidly as a result of its port providing shelter to the smuggling trade. After the Island was revested by the British Crown and smuggling saw a decline, Douglas became a popular tourist destination for visitors from the United Kingdom.

In 1869, the decision was made by Tynwald, the Island's parliament, to move the capital from Castletown in the south of the Island to Douglas. As the new seat of the government, Douglas continued to grow and by 1891, was home to 35% of the Manx population. During much of the 19th century, Douglas was governed by Town Commissioners however their powers severely limited.

However in throughout the early 1880s, the commissioners received additional powers and Tynwald passed the Local Government Act 1886, providing the municipal government with the ability to raise and set the level of rates within the town and provided the Town Commissioners with unlimited borrowing powers subject to Tynwald approval. The act also gave the Commissioners the ability to set bye-laws and to source gas and water for the town. The same year with the passage for the Foreshore Act 1886, the local government gained ownership and responsibility for the foreshore.

Tynwald passed the Douglas Improvement Act 1899 which gave the commissioners the power to declare areas unhealthy and seize unsanitary buildings, as well as the power to create redevelopment and improvement plans for parts of the town. The act also required the commissioners to provide housing for working class residents.

The Douglas Water and Loans Act 1890 authorised the creation of stock to the extent of £217,500, of which £144,000 was spent in acquiring the property from the Waterworks Company. That year also the passing of an act which permitted the Town Commissioners to close all private slaughter-houses in the town, when they had provided a public slaughter-house.

In 1895, Douglas was formally incorporated into a town. The Douglas Municipal Corporation Act 1895 was passed by Tynwald to provide for the election of 18 councillors for the town’s six wards with six aldermen elected by the councillors. This legislation enabled the formation of the Municipal Borough of Douglas in 1896. In 2022, Douglas was formally conferred city status by letters patent after a successful application during Elizabeth II's Platinum Jubilee.

== Structure ==
The modern Council is made up of 12 councillors elected from 4 wards across Douglas. These are Central, East, North and South. The boundaries of each ward aligns with the corresponding House of Keys Constituency. Each ward elects three councillors for a term of four years using the multiple non-transferrable vote electoral system.

Prior to the 2021 Local Authority elections the number of councillors was reduced from 18 to 12 and the number of wards was reduced from 6 to 4.

The council operates though a system of committees and is led by the Executive Committee. The executive committee is composed of five councillors: the leader of the Council, who serves as its chairman, the chairmen for each of the three policy committees, and a Member who does not serve on the three policy committees.

The full Council elects the leader of the Council, the chairmen for each of the three policy committees, the chairman and members of the Standards Committee, the chairman and members of the Pensions Committee, and the chairman and members of the Allotments Committee.

The Executive Committee then appoints members to serve on each of the policy committees. These committees are, the Housing and Property Committee, the Regeneration and Community Committee and the Environmental Services Committee.

The constitution requires that the leader and committee members hold office for a maximum of two municipal years, after which a special meeting is convened at which an election will take place to appoint all posts for the following two-year term of the Council.

Following the 2021 Manx Local Authority Elections Councillor Claire Louise Wells was elected Leader of the Council by a margin of 7 to 5 votes against Manx Labour Party Councillor Devon Watson.

== Mayor of Douglas ==
The non-political Mayor of Douglas serves the "first citizen of the City" and presides over Council meetings, promotes public involvement in the Council's activities and represents the Council at civic and ceremonial functions. The mayor is elected on a yearly basis by a majority of Councillors. The Mayor of Douglas is supported by the Office of the Mayor and receives an annual allowance to support them in their duties.

== Functions ==
The Council provides a range of services including public sector housing, recreation sites (including Douglas Golf Course), refuse, car parking, crematorium and graveyards services, libraries and has the power to set bye-laws for the city.

Along with Onchan and Braddan, Douglas is one of the three Island local authorities which collects local authority rates from property owners, however water and burial ground rates are collected by the Isle of Man Treasury.
