= Southend High School for Boys =

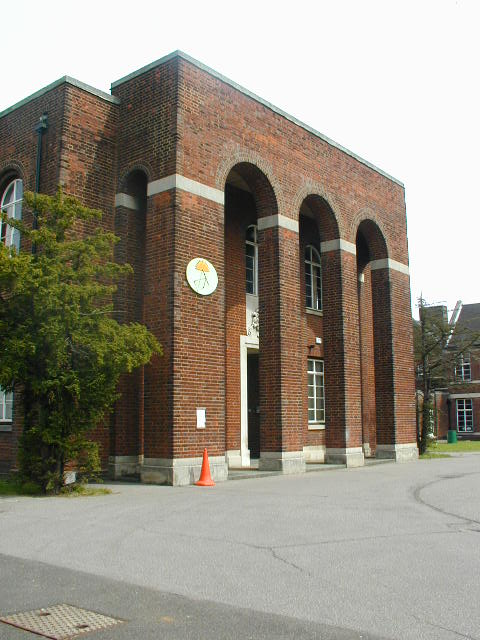
- School crest Front arches of the Southend High School for Boys main building

Location
- Prittlewell Chase; Southend-on-Sea, Essex, SS0 0RG; England; 51.5534°N 0.6955°E

Information
- Type: 11–18 boys Grammar school with mixed sixth form
- Motto: Latin: Forti nihil difficile (To the determined, nothing is difficult)
- Religious affiliation: Anglican
- Established: 1895 (founded), 1939 (moved to current premises)
- Founder: Joseph Hitchcock
- Local authority: Southend-on-Sea
- Department for Education URN: 136443 Tables
- Ofsted: Reports
- Head teacher: Rachel Worth
- Gender: Boys (with mixed-gender sixth form)
- Age: 11 to 18
- Enrolment: Approximately 1,300
- Houses: Athens; Sparta; Troy; Tuscany
- Colours: Green and white
- Athletics: Athletics, Rugby union, football, cricket, rounders, basketball, badminton, tennis, cross country
- Publication: SHSBulletin (fortnightly, formerly weekly), Excel newsletter, Old Southendian Association magazine (annually), Southend Spectator (internal, bimonthly)
- Website: www.shsb.org.uk

Southend High School for Boys, also known by its initialism SHSB, is an 11–18 boys selective secondary grammar school situated along Prittlewell Chase in Prittlewell, in the north-west of Southend-on-Sea, England. It teaches students from the age of 11 through to 18 years old, and admission to the school is dependent upon their performance in selective 11+ tests set by the Consortium of Selective Schools in Essex (CSSE). It converted to Academy status on 1 February 2011, and has autonomous control over itself. Student numbers have been increasing over recent years, and, as of academic year 2023–2024, just over 1,300 students on roll, with over 420 of them in the co–educational Sixth Form.

The school consistently achieves over 95% of its students attaining 5 GCSEs grade A*–C each year, and was one of the few schools in the country to achieve "outstanding" in the 2006 Ofsted inspection.

== History ==
=== Establishment ===
The Technical Instruction Act 1889 and Technical Instruction Act 1891 allowed councils to provide evening classes for technical subjects. The local board set up the Technical Instruction Committee, and soon classes were started. They were extremely popular, and the following year the newly created Southend Corporation purchased land in Clarence Road to build a Technical Institute. In 1895 the foundation stone was laid, but prior to it opening it was decided to also open a day technical school for about 20 pupils, influenced by the Bryce commission of 1894. The first headmaster was J Hitchcock from Woolwich and was supported by one assistant teacher.

The new building however was quickly outgrown, with 72 pupils by 1896 and to 146 by 1901, mirroring the growth of the town. The Technical Instruction Committee urged the Council to build a new school in 1896, with pupil numbers expected to grow to 400 by 1907. Unfortunately the vote by the council was 10 for and 10 against. However, plans were developed to build a new school, library and town hall on land owned by the council at Victoria Circus. A design by H. T. Hare was chosen, with an estimated price of £16,350, with a grant of £5,000 provided by Essex County Council towards the cost. However by 1900, these plans fell apart and the library and town hall were dropped from the plans as estimated costs had risen to £27,000. In 1901, the foundation stone was laid by Lord Avebury, and a year later the joint Technical Institute and Day Technical School was opened by the Countess of Warwick. The day technical school was a pioneer in the country in that amongst its pupils were girls.

By 1905, an extension was added to cope with the demand of both the day technical school and the college of art which was located in the top floor. In 1907, Essex County Council formed a new Higher Education committee, who decided that education should be split into separate boys and girls schools. In 1912, a foundation stone was laid in Boston Avenue for a new girls school, and a year later the girls left the Day Technical School to the new Southend High School for Girls. The Day Technical School was renamed as Southend High School for Boys. In 1914, Southend became a County Borough, taking charge of all education in the town, including the High School, School of Art and the Evening class institute all located still in the same building.

After the war the number of pupils increased, so in 1919 the School of Art moved out of the top floor to make room for the High School, into temporary wooden buildings at the rear of the building. Land was purchased on the corner of Victoria Avenue and Carnarvon Road to build a new further education college to host both the school of art and the evening class institute. The School of Art would become the nucleus of the newly formed Municipal College, however by 1934 the council had decided that the site purchased for the college would be better for a new town hall. By this time the school had 618 pupils and the site was to small. In 1936, the council purchased a site on the Earls Hall Garden Estate, and employed architect Frank W. Smith, who designed new buildings with an estimated cost of £65,000. The construction work started in 1936, and in September 1938 the school reopened in the new building at Prittlewell Chase.

In 1940 the school was evacuated to Mansfield in Nottinghamshire but the boys returned before the end of the war. Until 1974 it was administered by the County Borough of Southend-on-Sea Education Committee, then Essex County Council, and then the Unitary Authority of Southend-on-Sea from 1998.

=== Specialism and awards ===
In 2001 the school was a Language College as part of the Specialist Schools and Academies Trust, promoting modern foreign languages both inside and outside the curriculum as well as within the local community. It was a founder member of Southend Excellence Cluster, supporting and collaborating with nearly thirty primary and secondary schools. In 2006, as a high-performing specialist school, it was invited to become a Leading Edge school, promoting innovation in teaching and learning in liaison with local partner schools.

The school has also, in the past, received the National Association for Able Children in Education (NACE) Challenge Award "for Excellence in Provision for Able, Gifted & Talented Pupils", the Leading Aspect Award, and the Department for Education and Skills Sportsmark award.

In 2023, the school secured a fifth consecutive accreditation for the (NACE) Challenge Award - it was the first school in the world to do so. Staff at the school are actively engaged with the National Association for Able Children in Education in supporting research-informed pedagogical development in schools across the UK; hosting regular visits for teachers to attend workshops and visit lessons.

=== Building extensions and premises upgrades ===
Although the building was originally built almost symmetrically in 1939, it has undergone various changes which have meant that this is no longer the case. In 1992, QE1 and QE2 classrooms were built inside the East End quadrangle to cope with the demand arising from extra pupils. In 1995, the Hitchcock Library was constructed to fill in the West End quadrangle with a new art room, W17 on top. The library was needed to alleviate overcrowding in the "Old Library" which is located above the headmaster's office & main school office. In 1998, the Sixth Form centre was built, removing four of the "temporary huts" 37 years after they were built.

In 2003, the Language College was constructed to create room for an expanded intake of pupils; an extra 25 per year starting in the 2002–2003 year. As this was built, subject rooms also got swapped around; Mathematics moved from the four other huts into E1, E2, E3 and QE1 (E1 and E9 were previously German rooms, E2, QE1, and QE2 were French rooms, and E3 was a Latin room). E9 became an extra English Room (previously English had just E5, E6, E7 and E8) and Religious Education gained the use of QE2. Music also gained the use of L6 in the Language College for a short period of time whilst the Sports Hall & Music Centre was under construction. In the Language College, German was moved into L1 and L2, Spanish into L6 and L9, French into L10, L11, L12, L14, L15 and L16. L4, L7, and L8 are small rooms used for speaking practice and L3 and L13 are computer suites.

Owing to such a long time in sub-standard accommodation in Music and Physical Education (as mentioned by the OFSTED report of 2001), a bid was made to Southend Borough Council for a grant to be awarded for a new Sports Hall and Music Centre (following the construction of a top quality facility at St Bernard's High School for Girls). Permission was granted and the sum of £2.25 million was given to the school for the construction of this new facility. The school began a development appeal to raise a further £475,000 in order to equip the centre with the latest fitness machines and recording studio. This was the largest amount an English High School had hoped to raise in the history of British education. The appeal lasted for 3 years until 2006 when it was closed. The total raised was £376,000; slightly less than expected. Unlike the Sixth Form Centre and Language College, which were built from prefabricated units in a brick shell, this building was designed by Peter Emptage & Associates and built to last. According to documentation, this building is constructed to last 120 years. Constructed in a steel frame and finished in glass, red brick, micro-ribbed aluminium panelling and a beech coloured wood, the new centre boasts a 5 badminton court size sports hall, the largest school sports hall in Southend Borough (the only larger indoor hall is that at Southend Leisure & Tennis Centre). This building was completed in September 2005 and is now well used; not only by members of the school community but also the wider community in the evenings and at weekends.

In November 2008 two temporary classrooms were installed to the east of the main buildings between the music centre and the rear exit. These buildings have been constructed to relieve the inevitable stress of the new, larger pupil intake and also to provide alternative classrooms for the rooms disrupted by the planned complete window changes in the main building. The planning application was granted subject to the condition that the rooms are removed once the extension to the Sports Hall is completed.

In May 2009, a planning application was submitted to Southend Council to extend the Sports Hall & Music Centre on its western side, effectively infilling the underused grass area. The application included 6 classrooms over two phases; four in Phase 1 and 2 IT suites in Phase 2, located to the north of Phase 1. The four classrooms will be used to house the Mathematics department and include 111 square metres of circulation space as well as ample storage and an office. A connection will be created from the fitness suite to the upstairs of the new extension, but will only come into use during emergency evacuations or disabled people using the lift in the main Sports Hall. Construction has begun in February 2010 with scheduled completion for Phase 1 in June 2010.

In December 2009, a planning application was submitted to Southend Council to extend the Dining Hall into the eating area with a 150 square metre room, linked to both the dining hall and main hall. This allows the room to be used both for the lunchtime seating expansion of the dining hall, exam desk expansion during exam season, and for light refreshments during school events such as the annual drama performance or music concerts. Over the summer months of 2010, T3 was converted to a food technology room due to the government's requirements for all schools to teach food technology as part of the curriculum beginning year 2010/11. In 2022, building works were completed on a new classroom on the second floor of the East End. The new classroom is intended for Special Educational Needs (SEN) pupils. A new catering facility and refurbishments to QE1 and QE2 were also completed.

== School overview ==
=== Headteachers ===
The current headteacher is Rachel V. Worth. She was first appointed as interim headteacher following the departure of her predecessor in 2024, before being confirmed as the permanent headteacher in February 2025. She is the school's eighth headteacher.

Previous headteachers include:

- Robin M. Bevan, 2007-2024
- Michael Frampton, 1988-2007
- Edward G. Morris, 1971-1988

=== Old Southendian Association ===
Former pupils, teachers, and other members of the school are known as Old Southendians, and are entitled to join the Old Southendian Association (OSA) of past members and alumni, to keep in touch and network with other former pupils at social, sporting, and musical events, and on trips and meals. The OSA has the motto "sustaining friendships", and is one of the oldest and largest Boys Associations in the country, with 2,470 members as of October 2011. The school also has a Parents' Association (PA), which is a registered charity, and associated PA Committee.

=== Academic attainment ===
The school was last inspected in June 2024 when the report by Ofsted (the Office for Standards in Education) included the following:

Pupils see themselves as a positive force for change. Pupils lead pioneering work on promoting understanding of neurodiversity. They are proactively growing this work across other schools nationally. Pupils develop a strong sense of moral purpose.

Southend High School for Boys is an inspirational place. Very long-standing leaders have worked with newer leaders to establish a culture of excellence. However, to say the school is just about academic excellence would not do it justice. There is an entire culture that develops pupils as young adults who have the highest levels of decency.

=== Award system ===
Students may earn a form of award called Colours for significant achievement in academics, sport, debating or music and drama. Commonly these are awarded to winners of National or County tournaments however they are also awarded for extraordinary service to the school. They are also awarded for prestigious efforts undertaken by students outside of their school careers. There are four forms of colours raising in prestige: Term colours, for students performing an act of real merit; Year Colours, for students performing meritorious acts over an academic year; Half school colours, for dedication, achievement and service to a field and Full School Colours which are awarded very rarely to remarkable acts carried out on behalf of the school across a student's school career.

Colours are indicated by a range of additions to a students blazers: term and year colours are indistinguishable and take the form of a small brass badge with coloured enamel affixed to the lapel. The badge is coloured to indicate the school year in which it was earned and the field it was earned in is embossed in brass on it. Half school colours take the form of a badge sewn onto the breast of the blazer above the school crest on the pocket. The badge is always school green and the text gold. Full School colours are gold band sewn in rings onto the arms of the blazer one ring per award.

== Traditions ==
=== House system ===
Students at Southend High School for Boys are split into four houses; Athens (motto: nulli secundus, lit. 'second to none'), Tuscany (motto: sine labore nihil, lit. 'nothing without effort'), Sparta (motto: non sibi sed domo, lit. 'not for self, for house'), and Troy (motto: fortiter et recte, lit. 'boldly and rightly'), modelled upon a traditional house system. Competitiveness is actively encouraged between houses as the students contend to win the Cock House Championship. Students compete in sports, music, debating and other fields to secure house points to establish the victor. In addition students earn house credits which are converted into house points which contribute towards the overall cup. As well as the overall cup each event holds its individual trophy as well as cups for individuals.

=== School song ===
During the school's early history, the school song was "Forty Years On" (a song adopted by several schools at the time). Around 1923, Lionel Elvin (a student and School Captain at the time) was invited to write an original song for the school after a conversation with his history master. Elvin wrote five verses which summarised school life and the nostalgic sentiment of its pupils. The song was presented to the Headmaster who approved. Although Elvin imagined the lyrics could be sung to the tune of The Lass that Loves a Sailor by Charles Dibdin, the school's music master wrote an original tune for Elvin's lyrics.

Sometime before the Second World War two of Elvin's five verses were dropped. Around 1939 another music master, Arthur Hutchings, composed a new tune for the song which has been used ever since. Hutchings wrote the new melody as a piano accompaniment in pencil at the back of his hymn book. In 1953 construction of a new organ was completed and music master Reginald Foxwell adapted the tune for organ. When Foxwell died suddenly in 1957 A-level music students Gerald Usher and Paul Green inherited the responsibility of leading the school song for a year until a new music master was appointed. The two students found that no copy of the song existed and Hutchings' hymn book notes had been lost. Usher played the accompaniment as he remembered it and Green taught the younger students the lyrics. Although the lyrics were written down, when the two students left a year later the melody had still not been written down and only survived through memory and through passing it down from one generation to the next.

Thirty five years later in 1993 Usher was invited by Headmaster Michael Frampton to teach A-level music. Usher was shocked to find that the song was rarely sung and had changed somewhat due to it being passed on through oral tradition. Usher wrote down the 1957 version of the song from memory and made numerous copies. A few years later a copy of Hutchings' melody resurfaced in an old school newsletter from the 1940s and Usher was delighted to find that he had only mis-remembered one note and a slightly spread chord. During his time as a teacher, Usher encouraged the singing of the school song at numerous school events and nurtured its popularity among students.

The school song has since been printed and published in several documents. The song is sung at several events every academic year, most notably at the end of the final assembly of each school term, during which the entire school (except the new students whom this is intended to startle) shouts the last word (“memory”) at the top of their voice. It is also sung by members of the Old Southendian Association at meet ups and is often sung by sixth form students repeatedly during their last day. The school song is used as the music on hold when calling the school's reception.

== Notable Old Southendians ==
- Mathew Baynton, actor
- David Austin (cartoonist) (1935–2005), cartoonist for Private Eye
- David Witts, actor and model
- Phil Gardner, journalist
- Brian Gibson, film director
- Jonathan Clements (born 1971), author
- Robert Nye (1939–2016), poet and novelist
- Chris Copping and Robin Trower of Procol Harum
- Sam Duckworth, lead singer of Get Cape. Wear Cape. Fly
- Digby Fairweather, Jazz musician
- Arthur Hutchings, musicologist, taught at the school, 1938–1941
- Adrian Lucas, conductor and organist
- Vivian Stanshall, poet, author and singer-songwriter
- Bernard Stevens, composer
- Brigadier Martin Hotine, commanded the Royal Engineers from 1917 to 1918, responsible for the design of the UK's triangulation pillars and for the Retriangulation of Great Britain in the 1930s
- Henry Chilver, Baron Chilver of Cranfield, engineer, Vice-Chancellor from 1970 to 1989 of Cranfield Institute of Technology (since 1993 Cranfield University)
- Bertram Kelly, electrical engineer
- Neil F. Johnson, professor of physics
- Yadvinder Malhi, professor of ecosystem science at the University of Oxford
- Stanley Alexander de Smith, Downing Professor of the Laws of England from 1970 to 1974 at the University of Cambridge
- Stephen Pewsey, historian
- Warwick Rodwell, architectural historian and archaeologist
- Samuel Soal, parapsychologist
- Roger Luckhurst, writer and academic
- Clive Needle, Labour MEP from 1994 to 1999 for Norfolk
- Lionel Elvin, UNESCO Director of Education
- Gareth Bennett, ecclesiastical historian
- Bertram Kelly, engineer who brought electricity to the Isle of Man and later became a vicar
- Mark Foster, swimmer
- Morgan Fox, footballer
- Josh Rees, footballer
- John Lloyd, Tennis Player
- Garry Nelson, footballer and author
- Emile Acquah, footballer
- Noah Chilvers, footballer
