= Phil Gardner =

British writer, playwright and journalist

Phil Gardner (born 29 July 1973) is a British writer, playwright and journalist. He lives in Brighton, East Sussex, where he writes regularly for The Argus website and The Kemptown Rag, based in the Kemptown district of Brighton

== Early life ==
Phil Gardner was born in Hastings, East Sussex, and grew up in Basildon, Essex. He attended Southend High School for Boys and Woodlands School in Basildon.

== The Poddington Peas ==
In 1992 Gardner was invited to write for the BBC's animated children's television show The Poddington Peas. He was involved in the development of two new sets of characters, The Bugz and The Freshwater Friends, which were intended to be introduced to an American audience under the title The Wonderful World of Poddington. The project, which was to be produced in conjunction with HIT Entertainment, was ultimately abandoned and no episodes featuring the new characters were ever made.

== Plays ==
Gardner has written a number of plays, the first of which, Internet Cafe (2002) has also been turned into a movie screenplay. Be Worth It (2003) was acclaimed by both the Royal Court and the Soho Theatre in London, but perhaps his most successful play is Ledgers (2003), a one-act comedy taking as its theme the subject of depression and suicide, which has been performed in both the UK and US.

== Micro Fiction ==
Gardner's Micro Fiction has won awards on both sides of the Atlantic, and has featured on the curriculum in a number of US high schools, as well as appearing on the Contemporary English syllabus at the University of Lyon in France.

== Mirkin Topp ==
In November 2004, Gardner took part in the National Novel Writing Month, producing the fantasy novel Mirkin Topp and the Hair of the Dog.

== The Peter Marlin Story ==
In November 2006, the Hoax-Slayer website revealed Phil Gardner to be the author of The Peter Marlin Story, an elaborate online hoax written in 2004 and purporting to be a journalist's account of his dealings with a serial killer. Gardner has since admitted to its authorship on his own blog, and has also written of his mild loathing of the piece.

== Mulled Whines ==
Gardner's personal blog, Mulled Whines, gives a humorous and ironic account of his daily life, and has been running since January 2003. In September 2007 it was nominated for a Brighton Web Award.

== Depression ==
Gardner suffered from clinical depression for much of the late 1990s and has written extensively about his experience of the illness and the prejudice encountered by its sufferers. He is a supporter of Mind and has campaigned for the equal treatment of people with mental health problems, particularly in relation to employment.
