= Bertram Kelly =

Manx engineer

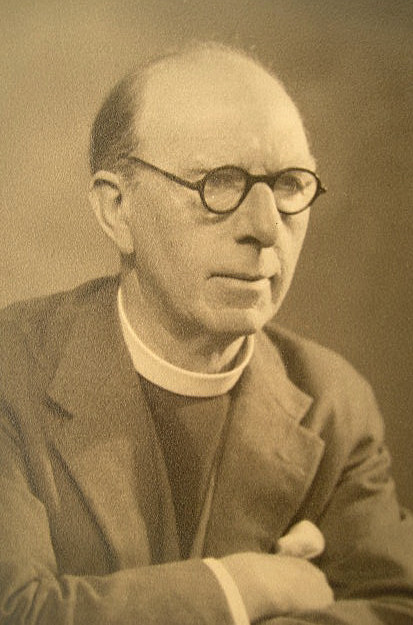
- Bertram Kelly – credited with lighting up the Isle of Man
- Born: Bertram George Kelly; 4 January 1884; Douglas, Isle of Man
- Died: 1976 (aged 92); Isle of Man
- Education: Southend High School for Boys; Royal Technical College
- Spouse: Daisy "Nina" Christian
- Children: Sybil Marjorie, Joan Christian, Monica Joyce
- Parent(s): Captain James Kelly and Margaret Qurik
- Engineering career
- Discipline: Civil engineer
- Institutions: Institution of Civil Engineers
- Practice name: Borough Electrical Engineer – Douglas, Isle of Man
- Projects: Bringing electric light to the Isle of Man

Bertram George Kelly (4 January 1884 – 1976) was born in Douglas, on the Isle of Man, and is credited with bringing electricity to the Island.

== Early life ==
Bertram Kelly was born into a Manx seafaring family on 4 January 1884. His mother was Margaret Quirk and his father was Captain James Kelly. Captain Kelly was a master mariner who changed careers later in life to become manager of Southend-on-Sea Pier, Pavilion and Electric Tramways in 1887. Following this appointment, Captain Kelly moved his family to England.

Bertram Kelly was educated at Southend High School for Boys and Walton College before studying electrical engineering at the Royal Technical College, Glasgow. After finishing his education, Kelly took up electric lighting posts with Midland Railway, London County Council and Hornsey Borough Council. While in London, he was an active member of the London Manx Society.

== Bringing electric light to the Isle of Man ==
Bertram Kelly when he was appointed as the first Borough Electrical Engineer

Bertram Kelly returned to the Isle of Man in 1920, where he was appointed chief assistant engineer to the Manx Electric Railway. Two years later, in 1922, he was appointed as the first Douglas Borough Electrical Engineer – the year the Douglas Corporation Light and Power Act completed its passage through Tynwald. This enabled him to supervise the building of the North Quay power station.

His career was one of expert and visionary service to the Douglas electricity undertaking. He was a true pioneer and when he retired in 1947, the town council's electricity committee announced that during Mr Kelly's service, the undertaking's generating capacity rose from its original 410 kilowatts to 11,541 kilowatts and the number of consumers had risen from 424 in 1924 to 6,844. He was a remarkable man by any definition.

— History of the Manx Electricity Authority

== Church career ==
After retiring from the technical environment of Douglas Corporation Electricity Department, Kelly sought out a second career – this time in the church. After being ordained in the Church of England, he became vicar of Kirk Braddan, on the Isle of Man, in 1950. He served the parish for the next 14 years, until he retired for the second time in 1964. Part of his duties involved taking the open air church services outside Kirk Braddan each Sunday during the summer, a task he adored.

== Personal life ==
The Reverend Kelly with the Queen Mother in the 1960s.

Bertram Kelly married Douglas-born Daisy Christian at Dhoon Church, near Laxey, in 1911. The marriage produced three daughters, twins Sybil Marjorie and Joan Christian in 1912 and Monica Joyce in 1917. He died in 1976, at the age of 92.
