= Metropole Internment Camp =

WWII internment camp in Douglas, Isle of Man, UK

Coordinates: 54°09′58″N 4°27′56″W

The Metropole Internment Camp was a World War II internment camp in Douglas, Isle of Man. Officially known s “S” Camp, it was predominantly for Italians and was in existence from July 1940 until November 1944.

== Location ==
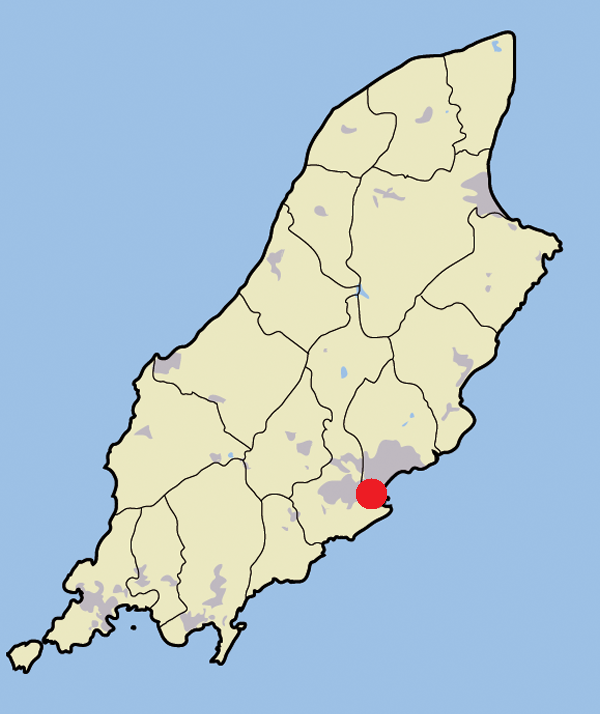
Douglas on the Isle of Man, the site of Metropole Camp

Metropole camp was located towards the northern end of the Douglas promenade, just before Strathallan Crescent and Summer Hill. The back of the camp was only a few yards from the rockface below Little Switzerland.

== Capacity ==
The camp opened in the first week of July 1940 with 743 internees. This number rose over the subsequent months but then dropped to 650 by January 1941. By October 1944 it had only 482 internees, and it was closed in the first week of November 1944.

== Structure ==
The camp comprised four former hotels and boarding houses: the Alexander (later renamed the Continental) and Metropole Hotels, the Waverley and Dodsworth's.

The Metropole Hotel had on its ground floor a canteen, a general store, a billiard room, a hall, a library, and a dining room, (which also acted as a recreation room outside of mealtimes). In the basement was a bakery, the parcel post office and the kitchen.

On the ground floor of the Alexander Hotel was the camp office, the assembly room, and a large dining room. In the basement were kitchens (where internees were permitted to do private cooking), a music room with a piano, correction room (for use by the internees’ “House Council” when they did not wish to report lighter misdeeds to the military authorities), and a room used as the church (where Mass was offered and confessions heard by internee priests).

In the Waverley on the ground floor was a large recreation room and dining room. In the basement of was the barber's shop, carpenter's shop, welfare office and a room used as a school.

The first, second and third floors of all the houses were devoted to bedrooms, bathrooms and toilets. The Alexandra had four bathrooms on each floor, the Metropole three and the Waverley two on each floor.

Most rooms were occupied by three men, although some were occupied by only one man, and some were set up as family rooms where up to eight men and boys could stay together.

Dodsworths was the infirmary.

Outside of the fence were the military headquarters, and a prison for internees undergoing special punishment. The latter of these was previously a stable used for the horses used for horse-drawn trams.

“It was an interesting prison, three feet wide and six long, with a manger at one end on which you could neither sit nor lie, a small ventilator window and a cobbled floor which was always damp. There were eight of these stall-cells, and the end one was used as a lavatory, so the stink was quite a revelation.”

== Camp life ==
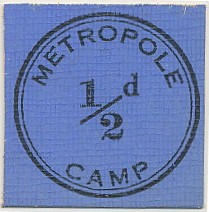
A half pence "coin" used within the camp by internees

Reveille was at 7 a.m., when roll call was taken and physical exercises undertaken before breakfast. Meals were generally taken communally, an unusual occurrence in the Manx internment camps possible only because of the large dining rooms stretching the length of the ground floor of the hotels. The men were free to entertain themselves between meals, which they did through various recreational, sporting and educational activities.

A school existed in the Metropole Hotel where French, English, Latin, German and Russian classes were taught. Cabaret performances were produced by internees in the dining room of Metropole Hotel, which was also used for indoor sports outside of mealtimes. In the basement of the Waverley was an Italian elementary school which was for the benefit of a number of sailors who could not read or write. Excursions under guard were also permitted, most notably walks along and beyond the promenade, and also swimming in the sea.

After an initial period at the beginning of the war, internees were permitted to apply to work outside of the camp on local farms. They also took up business of their own within the camp, for which they started their own internal currency created from stamped pieces of cardboard. Visits from relatives were permitted with prior arrangement and official permits from the Home Office. These would be for a limited period of time within a designated area of the camp.

At 5 p.m. roll call was again taken and the names announced of those being released in the morning were announced, a practice that began in October 1941 with the beginning of the release of “grade C” and soon “grade B” internees considered to be a little or no harm to the Allies.

Troop discipline was considered to be slack in comparison to the other camps on the island. Thefts from military stores and the occasional guard asleep on duty were reported, as were poor or forgotten searches of internees returning to the camp.

During the infrequent air raids on the island, the camp was evacuated to a quarry a hundred yards behind the camp.

== Escape attempts ==
There were three attempted escapes from Metropole camp. One concerned a man whose English wife was on the island to visit him. She was staying in a private hotel yards from the camp and so the internee escaped to visit her in her bedroom. However, he “only got as far as his shirt”, as the police arrived within minutes, having been informed by other guests at the hotel.

On 21 September 1942, two men broke through the wire to escape, but when they heard a guard approaching they hid in the Crescent Hotel next door to the camp. Within three hours they had been caught and returned to the camp, having spent most of that time hiding in a bedroom of the hotel.

A Marine engineer who spoke no English had suffered from psychiatric problems in the camp and so had briefly been a resident at the psychiatric hospital before being returned to the camp. However, he escaped from the camp, in order to walk back to the hospital to readmit himself.

== See also ==
- Category: People interned in the Isle of Man during World War II
