= Colin Wyatt (illustrator) =

- Area: Artist

Colin Wyatt (born 1939) worked from 1957 to 1980 for IPC Magazines as an illustrator of children's comics.

== Biography ==
Concentrating mostly on the very young children's stories, he contributed to such well-known titles and Tiny Tots and Jack and Jill, as well as illustrating many Disney tie-in comics and inserts.

In 1975, Wyatt began work on the controversial boy's comic Action! as Assistant Art Editor. When that title was withdrawn following the infamous "banned" issue, he became the Art Editor on IPC's new launch, science fiction comic 2000AD. Overseeing the comic's second and third years in print, he played a large role in nurturing the developing talents of Brian Bolland and Mike McMahon, among others.

After leaving IPC, Wyatt became a freelance artist, creating such children's series as the Poddington Peas.

== Personal life ==
Colin was fond of the Performing Arts and was a member of an Amateur Dramatics group in Thundersley, Essex. He performed in such shows as The Mikado, Pirates of Penzance and Fiddler on the Roof.

Colin has been married to Jan since 1965 and has two children: illustrator, Justin Wyatt and Debz Hobbs-Wyatt novelist and award-winning short story writer.
