= William Thomas Quirk =

Manx poet, composer and teacher

William Thomas Quirk (1908–1977) was a Manx poet, composer and teacher. He was most prolific in the publishing of his poems towards the end of his life, in the 1960s and 70s.

Quirk was born in Douglas on 12 April 1908, to William James Quirk (c.1877-1966), grocer and provisions merchant, and Margaret Helena née Corrin (c.1876-1945). He had a successful teaching career on the Isle of Man, at Demesne Road School, Onchan Primary School and Ballakermeen High Schools (interrupted by World War Two service in the R.A.F.), before serving as Headteacher at Foxdale School (1949–1955) and Victoria Road School, Castletown (1955–1971).

Quirk was prolific in his writing, creating poems, plays, operettas, music, short stories, articles, sermons and more, many of which were published in small publications. He published a book of poetry in 1968 with the title 'Lyrics by Lamplight' and a book of his Manx Stories called 'Four Stories for Christmas' followed by 'Four Yarns for Summer'. His poetry was published weekly, as were articles written under the title 'Christian Viewpoint', in the Manx newspapers during his lifetime as being by 'W. T. Quirk.' After his death, on 19 June 1977, his poetry has continued to be accessible through a collection of his Manx dialect poetry released in 2008, The Gaffer's Tales: Poems in Manx Dialect by W. T. Quirk, and a website that contains hundreds of his poems. He began writing at the age of 10 and he wrote his last poem on 17 June, just two days before his sudden death.
