= Douglas City Hall, Isle of Man =

Municipal building in Douglas, Isle of Man

Douglas City Hall
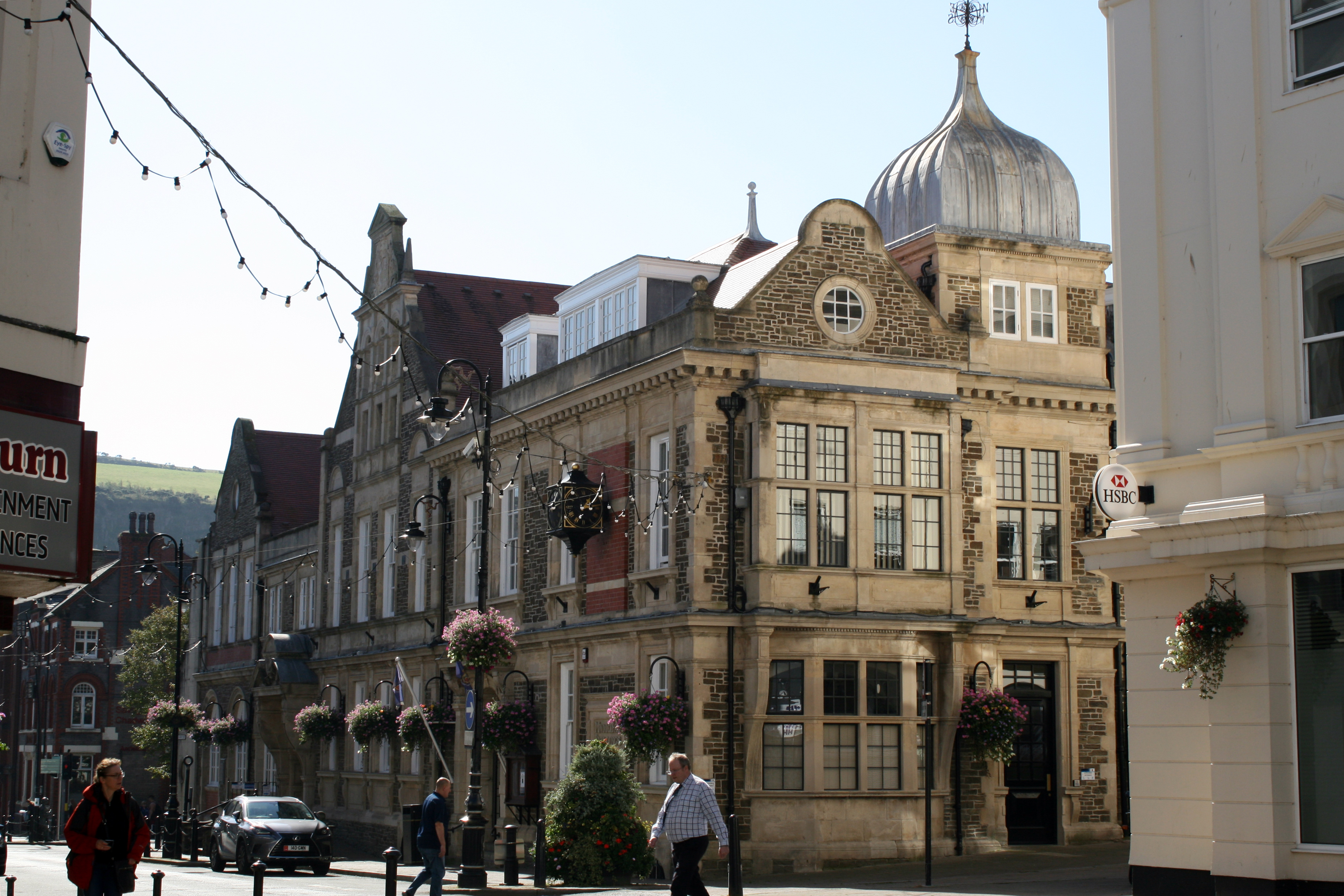
- The building in September 2019

- Shown in Isle of Man
- 54.1488°N 4.4808°W
- Location: Ridgeway Street, Douglas

History
- Built: 1900

Site notes
- Architect(s): Ardron & Dawson
- Architectural style: Renaissance Revival style

Douglas City Hall is a municipal building on Ridgeway Street, Douglas, Isle of Man. It accommodates the offices and meeting place of Douglas City Council. The building is recording on the protected buildings register of the Isle of Man.

== History ==
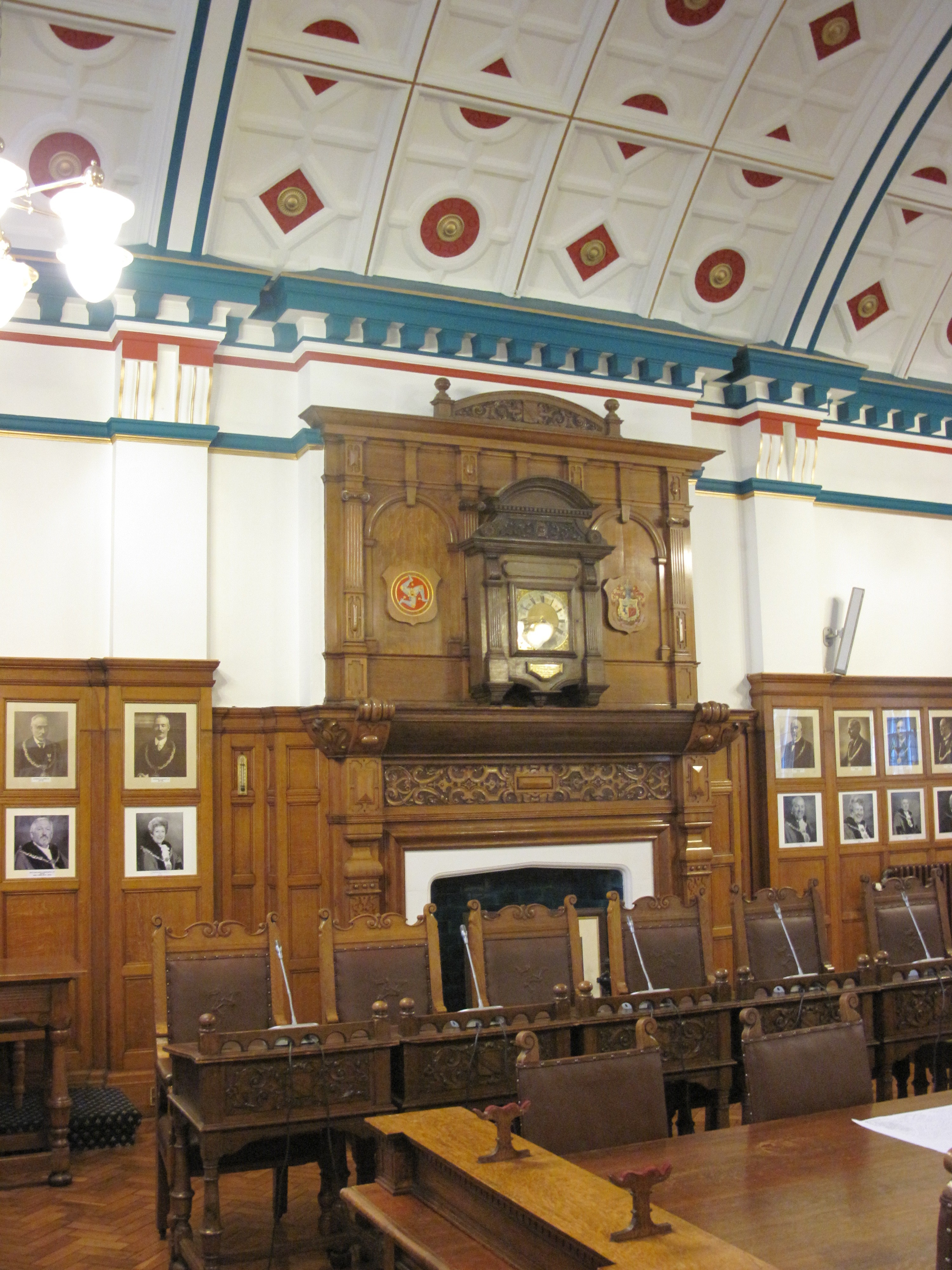
The Council Chamber

After significant population growth, largely associated with the seaside tourism industry, town commissioners were appointed in Douglas in 1860. The new commissioners established their offices in a single storey residential building in St Barnabas Square. The old town hall was designed in the neoclassical style, built in ashlar stone and dated back at least to the early 19th century. The design involved a symmetrical main frontage of three bays facing onto St Barnabas Square. The central bay featured a porch formed by a pair of Doric order columns supporting an entablature, which was inscribed with the words "Commissioners' Office". The other two bays were fenestrated by sash windows within slightly recessed arches.

Following the implementation of the Douglas Municipal Corporation Act 1895, which created an elected town council for Douglas, the new council decided to commission a new town hall. The site they selected was on the west side of Ridgeway Street. Construction of the new building started in 1897. It was designed by Ardron & Dawson of Westminster in the Renaissance Revival style, built by Gradwell and Co. of Barrow-in-Furness in rubble masonry at a cost of £25,708, and was officially opened by the mayor, Alderman Samuel Webb, on 10 May 1900.

The design involved an asymmetrical main frontage of 11 bays facing onto Ridgeway Street. The left-hand section of four bays formed the public library: the fourth bay on the left featured a round headed opening with an open segmental pediment. The other bays were fenestrated with round headed windows on the ground floor and with sash windows on the first floor. The first two bays were surmounted by a gable containing an oculus. The right-hand section of seven bays formed the town hall: the third bay on the right featured a round headed opening with a triangular pediment. The other bays were fenestrated with sash windows on both floors and the first four bays on the left of the town hall section were surmounted by a gable. Internally, the principal rooms were the offices of the council officers on the ground floor and the council chamber, which was 47 feet (14 m) long and 32 feet (9.8 m) wide, on the first floor. The council chamber was panelled and featured an ornate arched ceiling designed by Warings of London.

An extensive programme of refurbishment works was undertaken in the early 1990s. A projecting clock, designed and manufactured by Potts of Leeds, was installed at the same time.

The building became known as Douglas City Hall, after Douglas was formally conferred city status by Letters Patent during the Platinum Jubilee of Elizabeth II in 2022. Queen Camilla visited the city hall and met civic leaders to formalise city status on 20 March 2024.
