= The Poddington Peas =

British animated television series (1989)

- VHS cover
- Genre: Animated television series
- Created by: Paul Needs; Colin Wyatt
- Written by: Paul Needs
- Directed by: Colin White; Pat Gavin
- Starring: Neil Pearson
- Composer: Geoff Stephens
- Country of origin: United Kingdom
- Original language: English
- No. of series: 1
- No. of episodes: 13

Production
- Producer: Laurie Frost
- Running time: 5 minutes

Original release
- Network: BBC One
- Release: 14 September – 22 December 1989

The Poddington Peas is a British animated television series that was created by Paul Needs and Colin Wyatt of Cairnvale Productions for Poddington PLC; it has thirteen five-minute episodes, and was aired on BBC One as part of the Children's BBC strand (as it had been known from its inception on 9 September 1985 until 4 October 1997) from 14 September to 22 December 1989. The series was regularly repeated throughout the 1990s and early 2000s until 2002. The series' theme song, composed by Geoff Stephens, describes the eponymous group of Peas living "down at the bottom of the garden". Human-sized garden objects, enormous in size to the Peas, are often seen, such as upturned flowerpots which serve as most of their buildings. Humans themselves are never seen or mentioned (with the single exception of Christmas gift-giver Santa Claus, who left his gifts at Creepy Castle in the last episode). All thirteen episodes were released on VHS by Palace Video in 1990 (HPV0018), but this is now out of print. As with the majority of other older BBC children's series, it has also never made it to DVD.

In 1992, writer Phil Gardner was employed by Poddington PLC to help them write a prospective second series of episodes, which were to include one with the intention of piloting the series in the United States, and feature a new group of characters known as the "Bugz" as well as the mischievous but well-intentioned "Podd Twins". However, these episodes were never published.

There was also a book series by Paul Needs, illustrated by Colin Wyatt and published by Boxtree and Award Publications. The books, including new titles, were later released with a new associated press, and merchandise complementing these titles was released in 2013. Later in 2013, a new Adobe Flash remake of the series was announced on Needs' website. With the new pilot originally offered to CBBC, then produced independently after it was turned down, a 90-second promotional clip appeared on Needs' site. However, the project was eventually abandoned due to copyright issues – whilst Needs and Wyatt were the creators, the BBC still owned the rights to the series and character names (even though it was last repeated in 2002), which would have proven too costly to secure for the independent project.

== Characters ==
Poster of The Poddington Peas cast

The series features a group of thirty-four anthropomorphic peas, and most of their names not only refer to their jobs and main characteristic traits (similar to The Smurfs), but are also plays on words (typically "pea" sounding like "-py", such as "Bump-Pea" sounding like "bumpy", "Chip-Pea" sounding like "chippy" and "Creep-Pea" sounding like "creepy").

- Black-Eyed Pea (male): A mischievous pea with a protruding tooth who wears a black eye patch over his right eye, is a darker shade of green than most of the others, and is usually seen with Creep-Pea; together the pair of them are often the villains of the series, and live in Creepy Castle, which overlooks Poddington and has its own patch of "Creepy Carrots" (who are named for having sinister eyes).
- Bump-Pea (male): A clumsy pea with a somewhat paranoid expression who is covered in bumps and has a big plaster on his left cheek.
- Captain Hop-Pea (male): A nautical captain (which explains his title) pea who has a moustache, a beard and a wooden left leg, wears a blue-and-white captain's hat, carries a non-astronomical telescope and sometimes appears to be in charge of the others. In later books his name is sometimes, inconstantly, rendered as Cap'n Hop-Pea. In later books he is often accompanied by a cabin boy-like sidekick named Rope-Pea, who is responsible for the cleanliness of his ship, and who wears a striped red and blue pirate's t-shirt.
- Chip-Pea (female): A "chippy" (or fish-and-chip shop, to give them their formal name) worker pea with ginger hair, who wears a white three-cornered hat, a blue bow tie and a white apron, and is often seen carrying a blue chip scoop
- Chop-Pea (male): A lumberjack pea who wears a stereotypical brown lumberjack's hat with flaps on its sides and carries an axe.
- Creep-Pea (male): A creepy-looking mischievous pea with two tufts of hair made to look like the Devil's horns, a long pointed nose and pointed teeth, who is again a darker shade of green than most of the others, and usually seen with his fellow villain Black-Eyed Pea.
- Dough-Pea (male): A somewhat bewildered-looking simple-minded chef pea who wears a big white chef's hat and carries a rolling pin.
- Dump-Pea (male): A fat, greedy, dumpy pea who is bigger and heavier than all of the others, and always eating (usually jam tarts).
- Garden Pea (male): A pea who likes gardening, has thin black hair and a thin black moustache, wears a straw hat and holds a spade. Books show him to also be a keen historian, who has traced the Poddington Peas' family roots.
- G-Pea (male): A general practitioner (and doctor) pea with white hair, glasses and a stethoscope, who carries a briefcase.
- Glop-Pea (male): An unkempt, unhygienic, and rather mysterious pea, hinted to be created by a scientist. Only seen in later books.
- Grump-Pea (male): A very grumpy-looking pea who likes to complain whenever the others require him to do something for an occasion.
- Hap-Pea (male): A happy, good-natured pea who wears a red baseball cap, and often appears to be the main character for the series.
- Hip-Pea (male): A musical hippy 1960s-era pea with long blond hair and a moustache, who wears a headband and carries a guitar. Later books show several other unnamed hippy peas in his company.
- Jump-Pea (male): A pea who has a single springlike hair and legs, and makes use of the latter for jumping higher than the others.
- Nap-Pea (male): The youngest pea, he is Penela-Pea's baby, who wears a white nappy, sits in a pushchair and carries a teddy bear.
- P.C. Pod (male): A policeman pea with a black moustache, who wears a blue helmet. His name is a pun on "P.C. Plod" from Noddy.
- Penela-Pea (female): A motherly pea who pushes her baby, Nap-Pea, around in a pushchair. Her name is a pun on the name "Penelope".
- Pop-Pea (male): A grandfatherly pea with white hair (even though he is mostly bald) who wears glasses and carries a walking stick.
- Princess Pea (female): Appearing in only one later book, she is a princess who inhabits a small, majestic castle located on a rise above the garden, who has lost her priceless golden pea. Her name is a play on the story of The Princess and the Pea, and the missing pea is indeed found under her mattress.
- Pup-Pea (dog): A small pea dog who helps keep the peace in Poddington, as P.C. Pod adopted him and trained him to be a police dog.
- Scoop-Pea (male): The editor for the "Daily Pod" (Poddington's daily newspaper), who wears glasses and a green eyeshade visor.
- Scrap-Pea (male): A scruffy tool and scrap worker pea with thin black hair and stubble, who wears a blue hat and carries a hammer.
- Scrum-Pea (male): A fairly elderly farmer pea, with thick white moustache and whiskers, and red checked shirt and dungarees. Talks in a West Country accent and often comments on things in old sounding, folklore sounding sayings.
- Skip-Pea (female): A young pea with blonde pigtails, who has two red bows on her head and always skips by using her skipping rope.
- Sleep-Pea (male): A dozy pea who wears a nightcap and sleeps too much, so always misses occasions that all the others turn up for.
- Slop-Pea (male): An artistic painting pea who has messy ginger hair, carries a paintbrush and is always covered in blobs of paint. In the later books, is sometimes shown to have an unpredictable artistic temperament.
- Snap-Pea (male): The photographer of the "Daily Pod" newspaper who wears a hat with a press pass in its brim and carries a camera.
- Snip-Pea (male): A barber pea who has smartly combed black hair and a brown moustache and carries a comb and pair of scissors.
- Snoop-Pea (male): A detective pea who wears a Sherlock Holmes-style deerstalker hat and carries a yellow magnifying glass.
- Soap-Pea (female): A clean pea who always has soapy bubbles covering her head, carries a bar of pink soap and often blows bubbles.
- Sweep-Pea (male): A street sweeper pea with a thin black moustache, who wears a brown cap and carries a broom and a waste bin.
- Sweet Pea (female): An attractive pea with a blonde ponytail and blue eyes, who wears a magenta bow on her head and both her feet.
- Tea-Pea (female): A tea lady pea with brown hair who wears a white maid's hat (or mob cap), and carries a teapot and a teacup.
- Wee McPea (male): A small Scottish pea, who has a ginger moustache and wears a Tam o'shanter.
- Weep-Pea (male): An easily-upset pea who always cries whenever he gets injured or something goes wrong and carries a handkerchief.
- Zip-Pea (male): A fast pea with thin black hair who wears a sweatband on his head, and always runs around quicker than the others.

== Episodes ==
The first twelve episodes were shown on BBC One as part of the Children's BBC strand on Thursdays at 3:50pm, while the last one was shown on that same channel, three weeks and one day after the penultimate one (because of its seasonal subject matter), on a Friday at 10:50am.

No.	Title	Original release date
1	"The Vegetable Show"	14 September 1989
2	"Creep-Pea Gets Carried Away"	21 September 1989
3	"Dump-Pea's Diet"	28 September 1989
4	"Mound of Trouble"	5 October 1989
5	"Hip-Pea's Band"	12 October 1989
6	"Well Done Dump-Pea"	19 October 1989
7	"Zip-Pea Saves the Day"	26 October 1989
8	"The Balloonatics"	2 November 1989
9	"The Poddle Island Mystery"	9 November 1989
10	"Dough-Pea Gets Lost"	16 November 1989
11	"Zip-Pea's Shadow"	23 November 1989
12	"Bubble Trouble"	30 November 1989
13	"Creep-Pea's Christmas Surprise"	22 December 1989

== Credits ==
- Written and created by: Paul Needs
- Original designs: Colin Wyatt
- Directors: Colin White, Pat Gavin
- Series director: Pat Gavin
- Producer: Laurie Frost
- Executive producer: Ian Green
- Narration: Neil Pearson
- Music and lyrics: Geoff Stephens
- Production managers: Muriel MacLeod, Heather Pedley
- Animation director: Tony Garth
- Layouts: Anna Brockett, Terry Dormer, Clive Dawson, Ted Pettengell, Arthur De Cloedt, Neil Salmon
- Animation: Billy Allison, Arthur Humberstone, Kevin Baldwin, Colin Hughes, Anna Brockett, Willard Kitchen, Paul Chung, Charles MacRae, Arthur De Cloedt, Rob Newman, Terry Dormer, Neil Salmon, Bob Godfrey, Kim Stephenson, Tony Guy, Paul Stone, Barry Hales, Simon (Jiminy) Turner, Stephen Hales, Glen Whiting
- Tracing: Mark Cheesman, Rona Couper
- Backgrounds: Sue Branch, Mike Hirsch, Pat Gavin, Ray Rankine, Ian Henderson, Vivienne Redmond, Gary Sycamore
- Paintings: Beverley Allan, Brian Holmes, Alex Barclay, Sophie Law, Christine Courtney, Phillip Lee, Lynn Durrans, Dena Mackenzie, Tessa Farrington, Sarah Marsden, Heather Fisher, Jacqui Millar, Alison Flintham, Audrey Murch, Beryl Godfrey, Joan Pettengell, Denise Hamby, Joanna Scott, Audrey Hammond, Lisa Stephenson, Louise Harding, Emma Tornero, Lynette Hodson
- Editors: Keith Holden, Kevin Ahern
- Co-ordinator: Louise Harding
- Paint and Trace Supervisor: Henrietta Maslin
- Title animation: Harold Whitaker
- Checking: Russell Murch, Louise Harding
- Rostrum: Cardiff Cartoon Cameras

== See also ==
- Podington (a village in Bedfordshire, England)
