= Yadvinder Malhi =

Yadvinder Malhi FRS
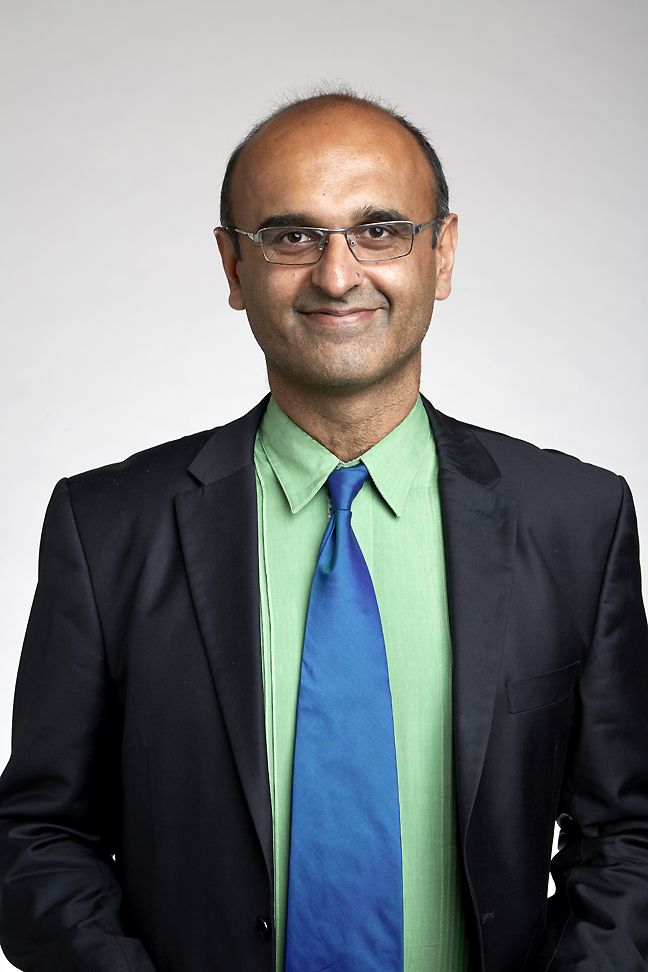
- Malhi in 2017
- Born: Yadvinder Singh Malhi; 1968 (age 57–58); High Wycombe, Buckinghamshire, United Kingdom
- Education: Southend High School for Boys
- Alma mater: University of Cambridge (BA, MA); University of Reading (PhD)
- Awards: Royal Society University Research Fellowship (1999–2005); Marsh Award for Climate Change Research, British Ecological Society (2016); Patron's Medal, Royal Geographical Society (2018); Ramon Margalef Prize for Ecology (2025)
- Scientific career
- Fields: Ecosystem ecology Tropical forests Climate change
- Workplaces: University of Oxford; University of Edinburgh; University of Reading
- Thesis: Sensible heat flux from heterogeneous surfaces (1993)
- Doctoral advisor: Alan Ibbetson; George Dugdale
- Website: yadvindermalhi.org

Yadvinder Singh Malhi (Punjabi: ਯਦਵਿੰਦਰ ਸਿੰਘ ਮਲਹੀ, born 1968) is a British ecologist who is Professor of Ecosystem Science at the University of Oxford and a Jackson Senior Research Fellow at Oriel College, Oxford.

== Education ==
Malhi was educated at Southend High School for Boys and Queens' College, Cambridge where he graduated with a Master of Arts degree in natural sciences (specialising in physics) in 1990. He completed postgraduate study at the University of Reading where he was awarded a PhD in meteorology in 1993 for research on the earth's energy budget and heat fluxes supervised by Alan Ibbetson and George Dugdale.

== Research and career ==
Malhi's early career focused on Amazonia, including some of the first measurements of carbon dioxide exchange in tropical forests but in recent years his research interests have expanded across Africa and Asia. He has ongoing projects in Malaysia, the Ankasa Conservation Area, Kakum National Park and Kogyae Strict Nature Reserve in Ghana, Lopé National Park in Gabon, the Serra do Mar coastal forests in Brazil. He also conducts field research in tropical island restoration and in Arctic tundra. In the context of the UK he has particular interests in ecosystems restoration, and also conducts extensive ecological research at Wytham Woods the Amazon rainforest and the Andes. He co-founded the RAINFOR network of forest plots across the Amazon forest (with Oliver Phillips), helped establish a 3500 m elevation transect study in the Amazon-Andes of Peru, and more recently founded the Global Ecosystems Monitoring (GEM) network of intensively studied sites across the tropics.

His work also makes use of microscale meteorology, global climate datasets, terrestrial ecosystem models and satellite remote sensing. This work has contributed to our understanding of the carbon sink in the terrestrial biosphere, and to how it may be vulnerable to climate warming. Malhi's research interests extend to a broad understanding of contemporary change in the biosphere and how to navigate it through the Anthropocene, through a combination of natural sciences, social sciences and science policy.

With Oliver Phillips at the University of Leeds, he co-edited the book Tropical Forests and Global Atmospheric Change published in 2005 by Oxford University Press. He was one of the 620 global contributors to the IPCC Fourth Assessment Report published by the Intergovernmental Panel on Climate Change in 2007.

As part of his teaching activities, he leads field trips to Wytham Woods in Oxfordshire. Malhi's research has been funded by the Natural Environment Research Council (NERC), the Royal Society, the European Union, the European Research Council (ERC), the Gordon and Betty Moore Foundation, Microsoft Research and the Earthwatch Institute. Before moving in Oxford in 2004, Malhi was a postdoctoral researcher(1995–1999) and Royal Society University Research Fellow (1999-2004) at the University of Edinburgh.

He was President of the Association for Tropical Biology and Conservation (ATBC) over 2017-2019, and was President of the British Ecological Society (2021-2022).

In May 2020 he was appointed Trustee of London's Natural History Museum. On 26 April 2024 Malhi was reappointed for a four-year term.

== Awards and honours ==
Malhi was elected a Fellow of the Royal Society (FRS) in 2017 having previously been awarded a Royal Society University Research Fellowship (URF) from 1999 to 2005.

In 2026 Malhi was elected a Fellow of the British Ecological Society.

Malhi was appointed Commander of the Order of the British Empire (CBE) in the 2020 Birthday Honours for services to ecosystem science.
