= Kogyae Strict Nature Reserve =

Park in Ghana

Coordinates: 7°11′N 1°5′W

Kogyae Strict Nature Reserve (or Kogyae) is a strict nature reserve, located near Kumasi, Ghana. The Kogyae Strict Nature Reserve was established in 1971 and has an area of 386 km^{2}. Animals present on the reserve include African buffalos, African civets, civet cats, and monkeys, as well as 85 species of birds. The reserve has taken the waterbuck as its symbol.
