= Arthur Forbes of Culloden =

Arms of Forbes of Culloden: Azure on a chevron between three bears’ heads couped argent, muzzled and langued gules, as many unicorns’ heads erased sable.

Arthur Forbes, 9th Laird of Culloden DL FRSE (1819–1879) was a Scottish landowner and amateur botanist. He was Deputy Lieutenant of Nairn and Ross. He was a descendant of Duncan Forbes of Culloden.

== Life ==
He was born at Douglas on the Isle of Man on 25 January 1819 the son of Duncan George Forbes of Culloden (1781–1840) and his wife, Sarak Walker (d.1838). He was educated at Aberdeen and then Cambridge University.

In 1843 he was elected a Fellow of the Royal Society of Edinburgh. His proposer was John Cockburn.

He died at Aldershot on 16 March 1879.

== Family ==
In 1849 he married Sarah Georgina Warrand (d.1879).
