= Rail transport in the Isle of Man =

The Isle of Man has a rich transport heritage and boasts the largest narrow-gauge railway network in the British Isles with several historic railways and tramways still in operation. These operate largely to what is known as "Manx Standard Gauge" (3 ft [914 mm] narrow gauge) and together they comprise about 65 miles (105 km) of Victorian railways and tramways. The Isle of Man Railway Museum in Port Erin allows people to find out more about the history of the Manx railways, and was until 1998 accompanied by a similar museum in Ramsey, which was dedicated to the history of the electric line, but this was closed and converted into a youth club. The steam railway to the south of the island, electric to the north and mountain line to the summit of Snaefell, the island's only mountain, are all government-owned, and operated under the title Isle of Man Railways, as a division of the island's Department of Infrastructure. The lines at Groudle Glen and Curraghs Wildlife Park are both privately owned but open to the public.

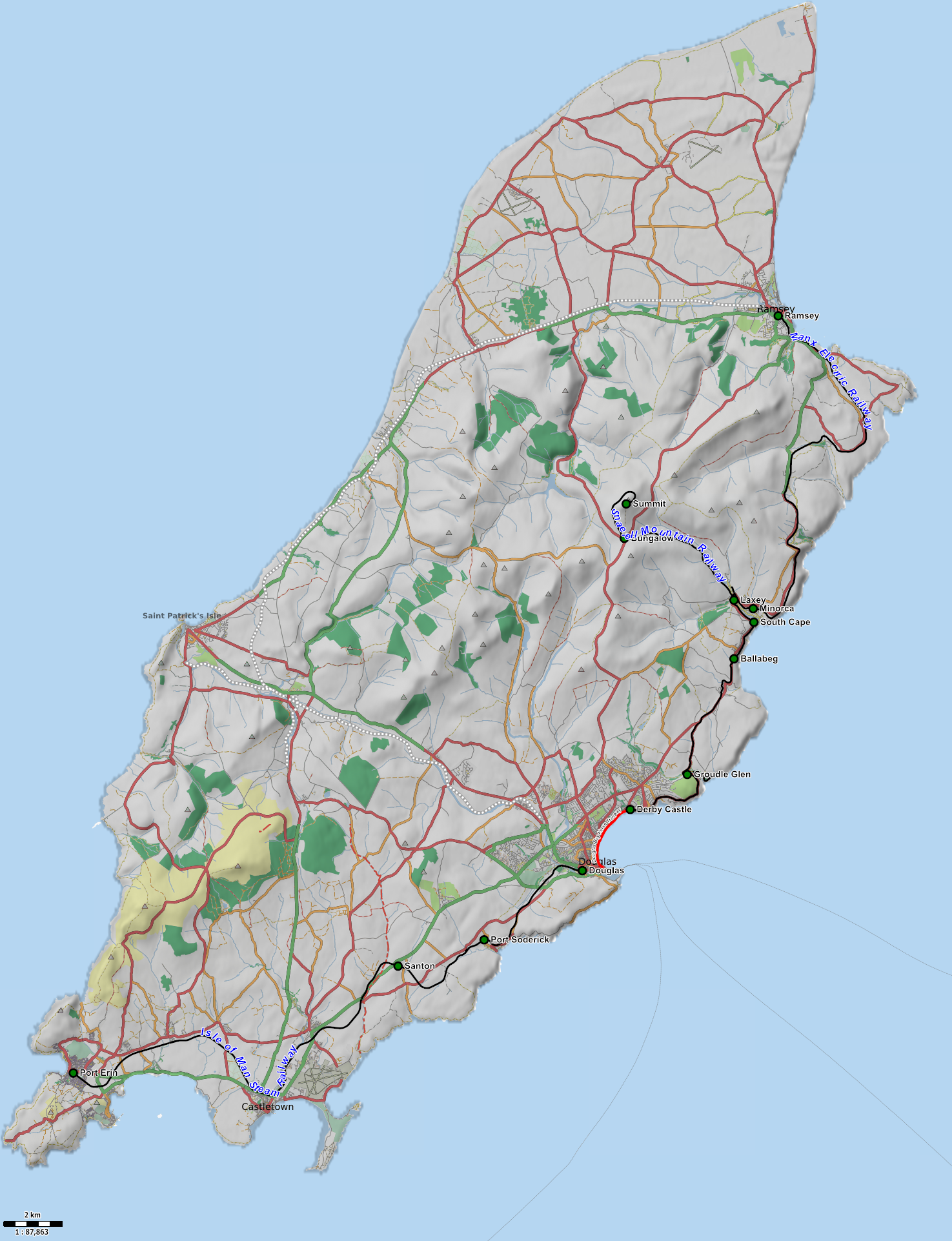
Map of main railways in the Isle of Man

== Lines ==
The lines listed in the table are or have been open to the general public. Most of the major lines had/have "Manx Standard Gauge" of 3 ft (914 mm).

Lines open to the general public
Name	Opened	Closed	Gauge	Length	Notes
Isle of Man Railway	1873	—	3 ft (914 mm)	15.5 miles (24.9 km)	Peel line closed 1969
Manx Northern Railway	1879	1905	3 ft (914 mm)	47 miles (76 km)	Taken over by the Isle of Man Railway in 1905. Last tracks used 1969.
Foxdale Railway	1886	1905	3 ft (914 mm)	2.25 miles (3.62 km)	Taken over by the Isle of Man Railway in 1905.
Snaefell Mountain Railway	1895	—	3 ft 6 in (1,067 mm)	5.5 miles (8.9 km)	
Groudle Glen Railway	1896	—	2 ft (610 mm)	0.9 kilometres (0.56 mi)	No service 1962 to 1983
Manx Electric Railway	1893	—	3 ft (914 mm)	17 miles (27 km)	
Douglas Bay Horse Tramway	1876	—	3 ft (914 mm)	1 mile (1.6 km)	
Great Laxey Mine Railway	1877; 2004	1929 —	19 in (483 mm)	0.25 miles (0.40 km)	Former mine railway, reopened in 2004 as a tourist heritage railway
Upper Douglas Cable Tramway	1896	1929	3 ft (914 mm)	1.57 miles (2.53 km)	
Douglas Southern Electric Tramway or Marine Drive railway	1896	1939	4 ft 8 1/2 in (1,435 mm)	4.7 miles (7.6 km)	
Douglas Head Funicular Railway or Douglas Head Inclined Railway	1900	1954	4 ft (1,219 mm)	450 feet (140 m)	Passenger incline railway
Port Soderick Cliff Lift	1896	1939	4 ft (1,219 mm)	217 feet (66 m)	First Falcon Cliff Lift sold to Port Soderick and re-erected there in 1896
Laxey Browside Tramway	1890	1906	5 ft (1,524 mm)	300 feet (91 m)	
Queen's Pier Tramway, Ramsey	1882	1971	3 ft (914 mm)	0.424 miles (0.682 km)	Restoration works under way
Orchid Line, Wildlife Park, Ballaugh	1992	—	Various		Miniature railway
First Falcon Cliff Lift, Douglas	1887	1896	4 ft (1,219 mm)	218 feet (66 m)	Sold and became the Port Soderick Cliff Lift
Second Falcon Cliff Lift, Douglas	1927	1990	5 ft (1,524 mm)	129 feet (39 m)	Track and installations still in place but overgrown.

There have been various other railways on the Isle of Man that have never been open for public transport, such as those in the various mines around the island. Among these are/were:

Glenfaba

- Glenfaba Brickworks Tramway
- Knockaloe branch line, owned by the IMR, for Knockaloe Internment Camp internees and supplies
- Peel Harbour Tramway, construction railway, 3 ft (914 mm), steam locomotives, built 1864 or 1865 and dismantled 1873.
  - Incline railway connecting to the Peel Harbour Tramway, self-acting incline.
  - Corrin's Hill, 3 ft (914 mm) horse-drawn construction railway connecting a stone quarry to the incline railway.

Garff

- A second Laxey Mine tramway, 3 ft (914 mm), horsedrawn, on the lower washing floor, constructed around 1865 and lasted until at least 1918

Middle

- Douglas Breakwater Crane Railway
- Douglas Holiday Camp
- A construction railway to the Injebreck Reservoir, 3 ft (914 mm), built 1899, length 4 1/2 miles (7.2 km) from Hillberry to the Reservoir, worked with steam locomotives.

Rushen

- Port Erin Breakwater Railway, a construction line for the Port Erin Breakwater. 7 ft (2,134 mm), steam traction, built 1864.

About fifty other minor tramways, in the various mines, quarries and sand pits, or on RAF gunnery lines, existed on the island.

== Use in film ==
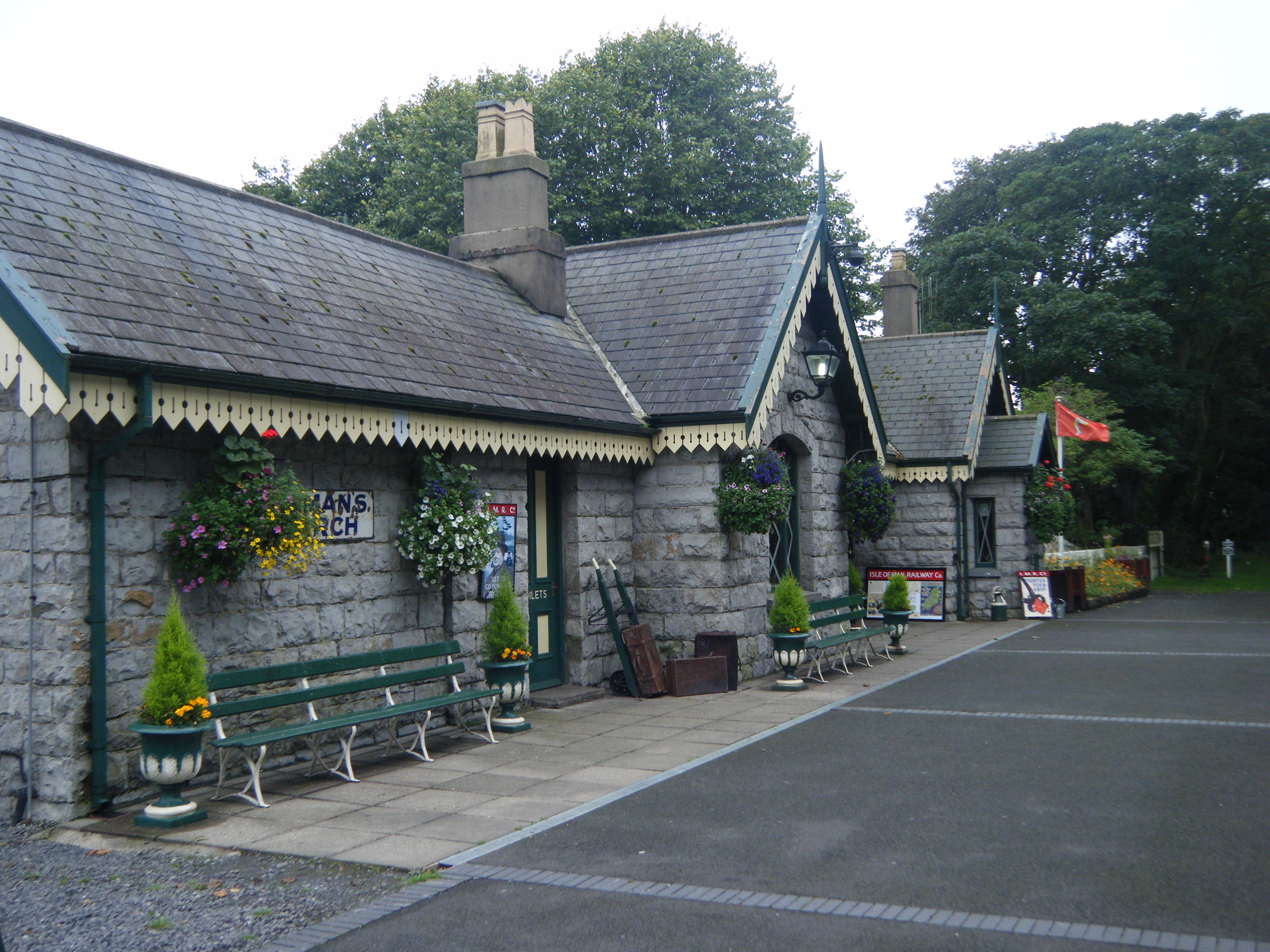
A 1979 edition of the BBC show Seaside Special featured the railway and used Castletown Station as a backdrop to a Chattanooga Choo Choo dance sequence.

The BBC adaptation of The Ginger Tree in which it doubled for communist Russia using the carriage shed at Douglas, lineside scenes and (No.11 Maitland was painted matte black for this production and remained in this guise for the remainder of the 1989 season) as well as being the subject of a 1988 BBC documentary as part of the Train Now Departing... series in an episode called "Steam in the Isle of Man". Other television credits include an adaptation of The Legend of the Tamworth Two, the television movie Stiff Upper Lips and the long-running travelogue show Wish You Were Here...? which featured Sir Norman Wisdom. In more recent times Great Coastal Railway Journeys has showcased the railway as well as Oz and James's Big Wine Adventure.

== See also ==
- Isle of Man
- List of heritage railways
- British narrow gauge railways
- Mountain railway
- Transport in the Isle of Man
- Sodor
