= 3 ft gauge railways =

Railway track gauge (914 mm)

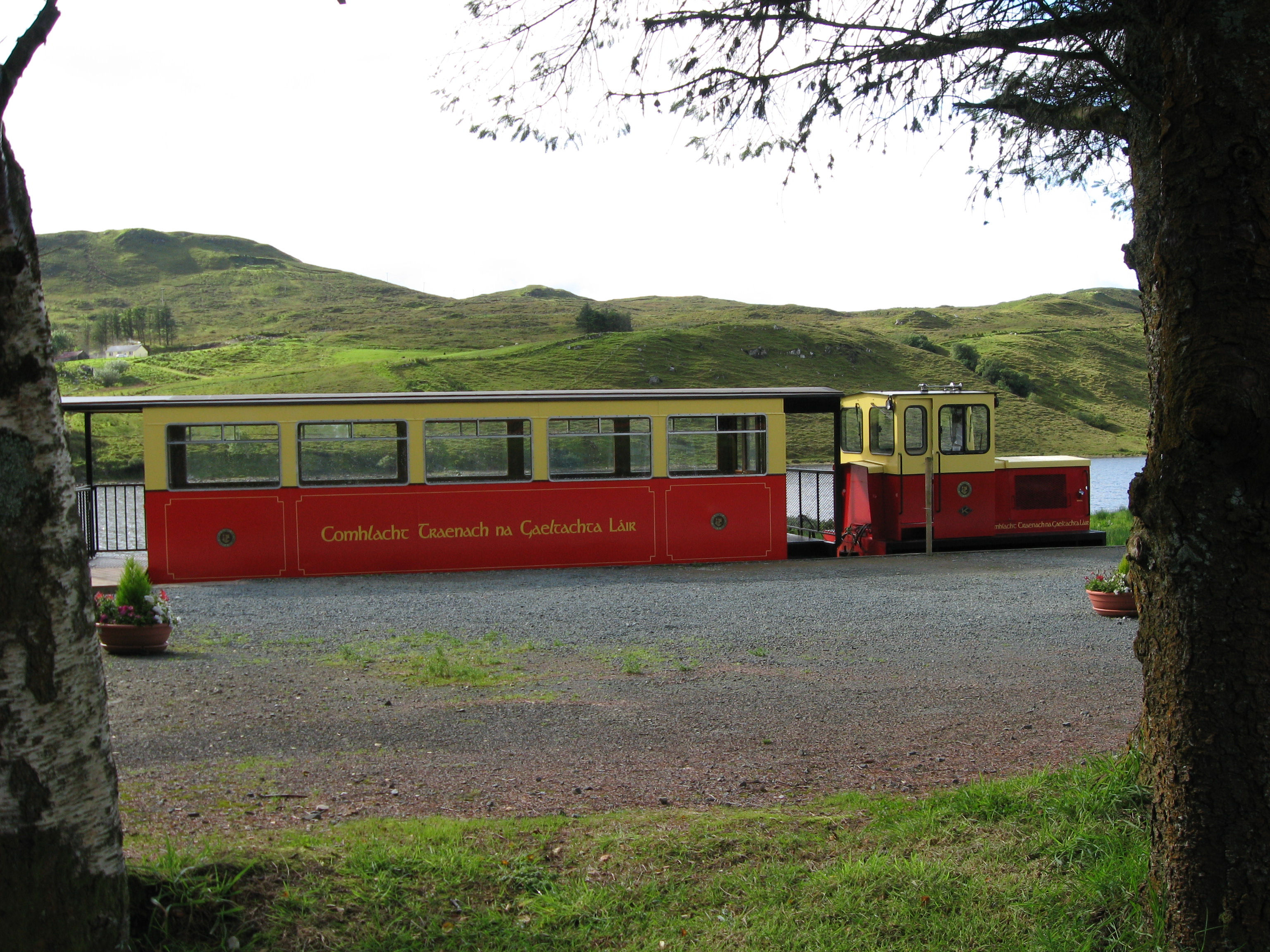
Fintown station on the trackbed of the County Donegal Railways Joint Committee (CDR) in County Donegal

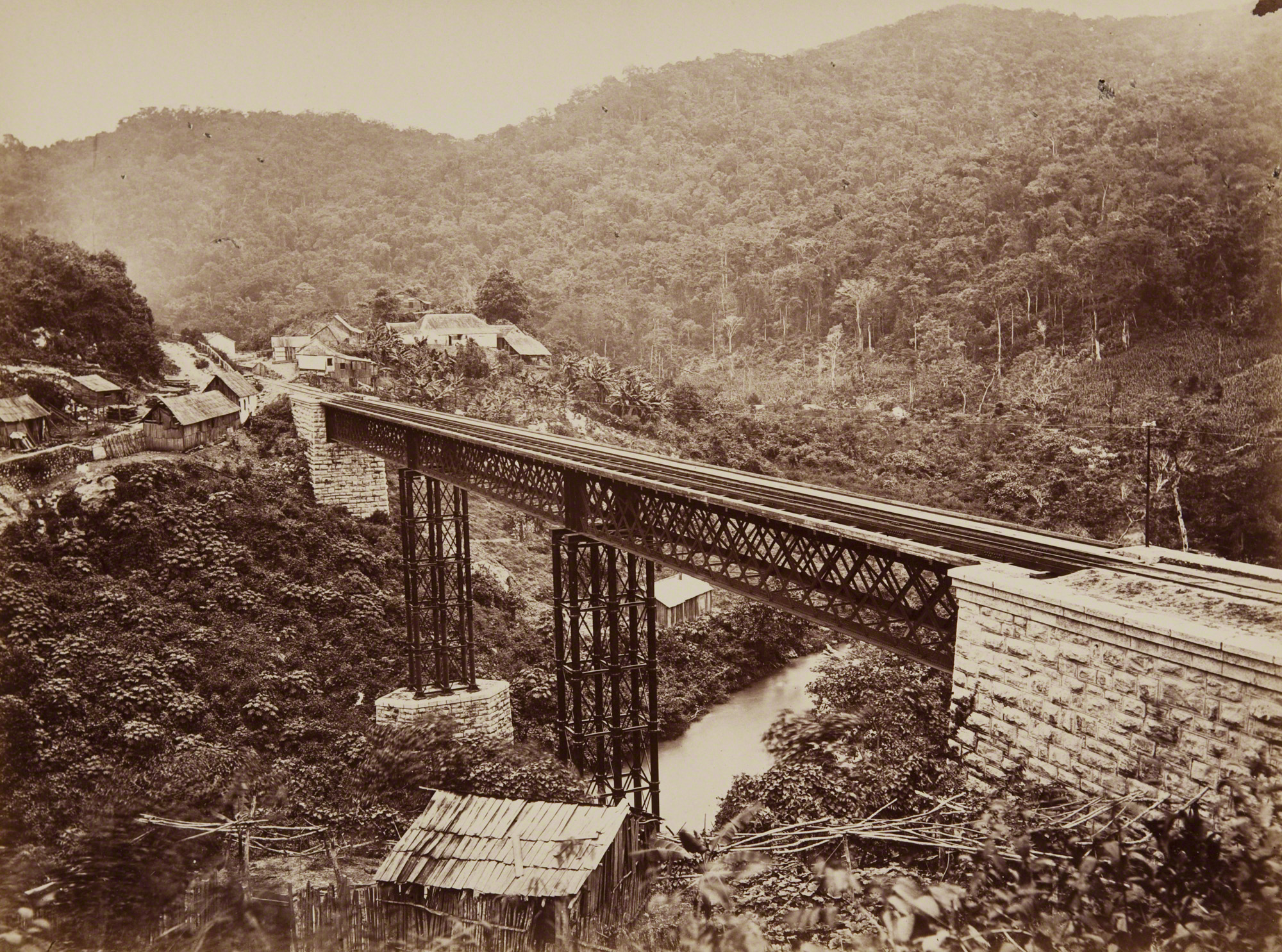
A bridge of the defunct National Railroad of Mexico in 1883

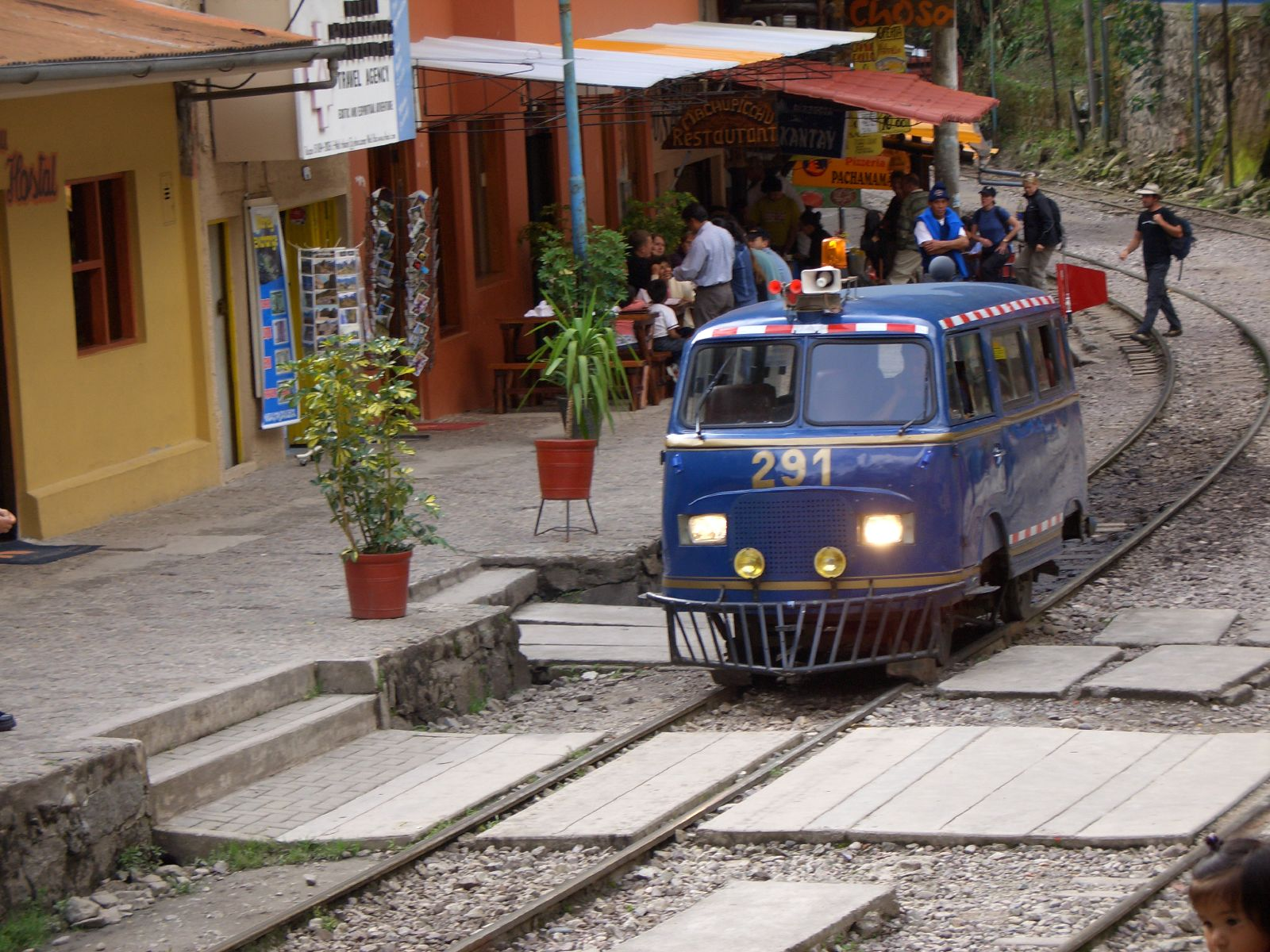
A railbus on the Ferrocarril Santa Ana near Machu Picchu

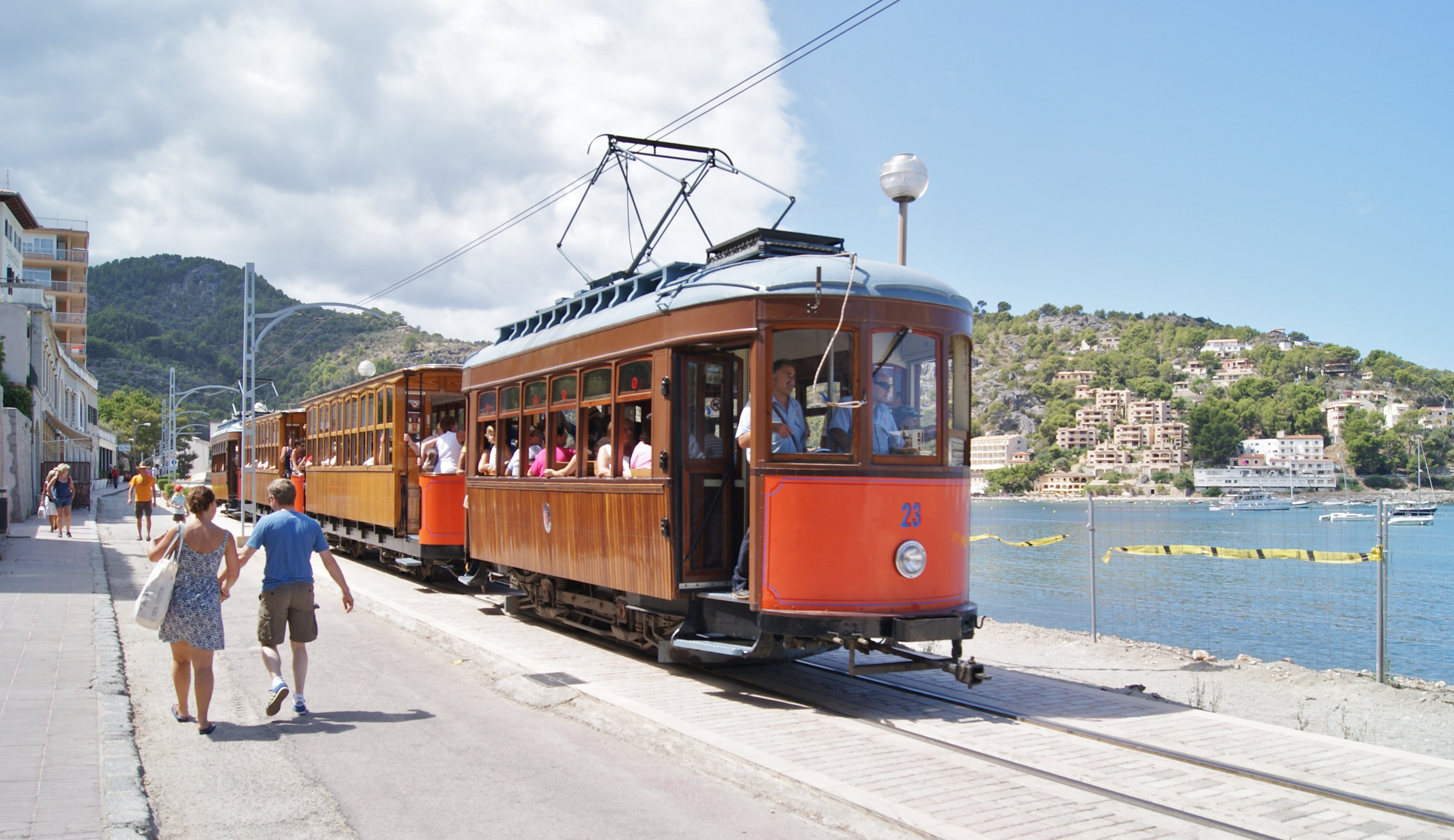
An electric tram on the Tranvía de Sóller on the Spanish island of Majorca

Three foot gauge railways have a track gauge of 3 ft (914 mm) or 1 yard. This gauge is a narrow gauge and is generally found throughout North, Central, and South America. In Ireland, many secondary and industrial lines were built to 3 ft gauge, and it is the dominant gauge on the Isle of Man, where it is known as the Manx Standard Gauge. Modern 3 ft gauge railways are most commonly found in isolated mountainous areas, on small islands, or in large-scale amusement parks and theme parks (see table below). This gauge is also popular in model railroading (particularly in G scale), and model prototypes of these railways have been made by several model train brands around the world, such as Accucraft Trains (US), Aristo-Craft Trains (US), Bachmann Industries (Hong Kong), Delton Locomotive Works (US), LGB (Germany), and PIKO (Germany).

== Railways ==
Country/territory	Railway
Australia	Powelltown Tramway (defunct)
Belize	Main article: Rail transport in Belize
Brazil	Colégio Regina Coeli (operating); Nossa Senhora da Glória do Outeiro (operating)
Canada	BC Forest Discovery Centre (operating); Columbia and Western Railway (defunct); Kaslo and Slocan Railway (defunct); Kimberley's Underground Mining Railway (defunct); Klondike Mines Railway (defunct); North Western Coal and Navigation Company (defunct); Sullivan Mine (defunct); Western Development Museum Short Line (located at the Moose Jaw Western Development Museum) (operating); White Pass & Yukon Route (crosses into Alaska, United States) (Historic Civil Engineering Landmark status) (operating as a heritage railway); Whitehorse Waterfront Trolley (operating as a heritage streetcar)
Colombia	Main article: Rail transport in Colombia
Cuba	Ferrocarril Recreacional (located in Parque Lenin) (closed - park still operating)
Denmark	Zealand Railway Company
El Salvador	Main article: Rail transport in El Salvador
France	Disneyland Railroad (Paris) (located in Disneyland Park (Paris)) (operating); Horse-Drawn Streetcars (located in Disneyland Park (Paris)) (operating)
Germany	Santa Fé Express (located in Fort Fun Abenteuerland) (operating); Trams in Chemnitz (converted to 925 mm (3 ft 13/32 in) gauge, then converted to standard gauge) (operating)
Guatemala	Main article: Rail transport in Guatemala
Guyana	Main article: Railways in Guyana
Honduras	Main article: Rail transport in Honduras
Hong Kong	Hong Kong Disneyland Railroad (located in Hong Kong Disneyland) (operating)
Ireland	Main article: List of narrow-gauge railways in Ireland
Iraq	Al Zawra’a Dream Park (operating)
Isle of Man	Douglas Bay Horse Tramway (operating); Foxdale Railway (defunct); Isle of Man Railway (operating); Manx Electric Railway (operating); Manx Northern Railway (defunct); Queen's Pier Tramway (defunct); Upper Douglas Cable Tramway (defunct)
Japan	Jolly Trolley (located in Tokyo Disneyland) (separate 2 ft 6 in (762 mm) gauge railway named Western River Railroad also present) (defunct - park and separate railway still operating); Koiwai Farm (operating); Saidaiji Railway (defunct); Seikan Tunnel Tappi Shakō Line (operating)
Kuwait	Kuwait Entertainment City (operating)
Mexico	Ferrocarriles Unidos de Yucatán (defunct); Interoceanic Railway of Mexico (defunct); National Railroad of Mexico (converted to standard gauge) (defunct); Parque Héroes Mexicanos (operating); Tren Escénico (operating)
Nauru	Main article: Rail transport in Nauru
New Caledonia	Nouméa-Païta Railway (defunct)
New Zealand	Dun Mountain Railway (defunct)
Peru	Ferrocarril Santa Ana (operating)
Philippines	Hawaiian–Philippine Company, Negros Island (operating).
Spain	Ferrocarril de Sóller (operating); Ferrocarril Tour (located in PortAventura Park) (operating); Tranvía de Sóller (operating); The Ferrocarril de Sóller and the Tranvía de Sóller are located on Majorca in the Balearic Islands. The other railways of the Majorca rail network were also 3 ft (914 mm) gauge, but with expansion and reconstruction of the network in the early 2000s, they were converted to 1,000 mm (3 ft 3 3/8 in) metre gauge.
United Kingdom	Main article: 3 ft gauge railways in the United Kingdom
United States	Main article: 3 ft gauge railroads in the United States

== See also ==
- Heritage railway
- Large amusement railways
- List of track gauges
- Swedish three foot gauge railways
