= Upper Douglas Cable Tramway =

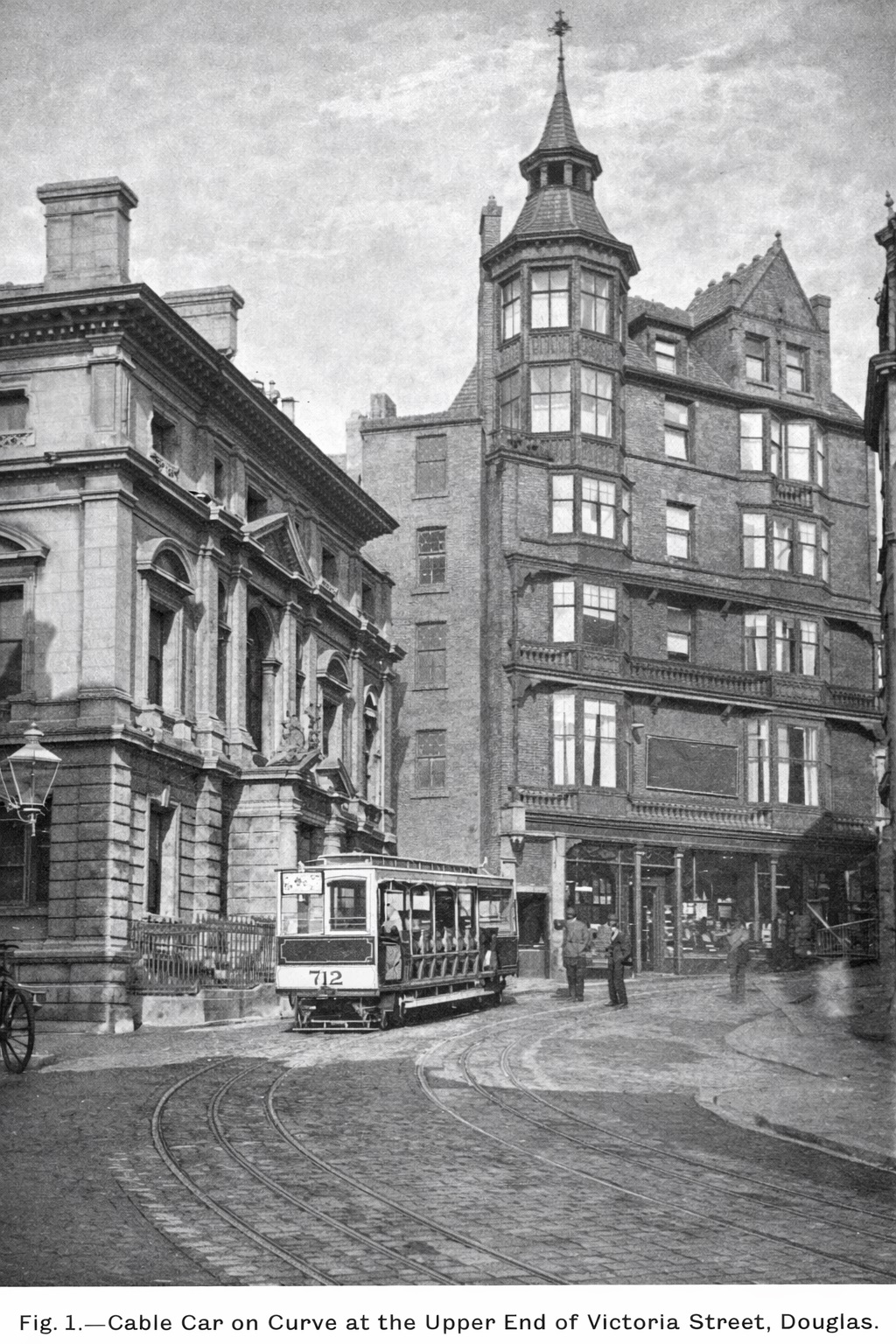
- A cable car on Victoria Street in 1896

Overview
- Status: Defunct

Service
- Type: Cable tramway
- Operator(s): Douglas Corporation

History
- Opened: 15 August 1896
- Closed: 19 August 1929

Technical
- Track gauge: 3 ft (914 mm)
Route map

The Upper Douglas Cable Tramway was a tram line serving all points between the southern end of the promenade and the upper part of the town of Douglas in the Isle of Man. It opened on 15 August 1896 and closed on 19 August 1929.

== History ==
Douglas Corporation, the local authority responsible for the town, persuaded the Isle of Man Tramways & Electric Power Company to build a line serving the hilly area of Upper Douglas in return for an extended franchise to operate the horse tramway. The line was built to 3 ft (914 mm) narrow gauge. Douglas Corporation acquired the tramway in 1902 after the collapse of Dumbell's Bank and the section south of the depot in York Road was closed as it was felt that the gradient made it too dangerous to operate. The service was downgraded to seasonal in 1922. After the line closed, the tracks remained in place until they were lifted in 1932. (in contradiction to this source however road works in the 1980s revealed some of the rails buried well under the modern road surface; in addition, in Waverley Road, on the depot entrance, a set of tramway rails and points remain; however, this may actually be from the time that the depot was used to service the horse trams: they were towed up to the depot using double decker buses). In January 2000, work in connection with the IRIS scheme unearthed the terminal cable pit at Broadway.

== Route ==
Both termini were on Douglas Promenade, at the Clock Tower and Broadway. The line followed a U-shaped route serving Victoria Street, Prospect Hill, Buck's Road, Woodbourne Road, York Road, Ballaquayle Road, and Broadway. There was a set of points connecting with the horse tramway at the Clock Tower. A proposed link to the horse tramway at Broadway was not built.

The locations listed mark road junctions, not stations or request stops.

Point	Coordinates (Links to map resources)	OS Grid Ref	Notes
Southern terminal	54.1490°N 4.4746°W	SC38477540	Junction with horse tramway
Duke Street	54.1493°N 4.4785°W	SC38227544	
Ridgeway Street	54.1493°N 4.4805°W	SC38097545	
Athol Street	54.1499°N 4.4807°W	SC38087551	
Circular Road	54.1513°N 4.4829°W	SC37947568	
Demesne Road	54.1533°N 4.4845°W	SC37847590	
Rose Mount	54.1547°N 4.4847°W	SC37847606	
Albany Road	54.1586°N 4.4869°W	SC37717650	
York Road	54.1612°N 4.4847°W	SC37867678	Sole tramway shelter remains in situ
Drury Terrace	54.1605°N 4.4818°W	SC38057670	Junction to works and carsheds
Victoria Road	54.1584°N 4.4795°W	SC38197646	Later terminal
Northern terminal	54.1571°N 4.4770°W	SC38357631	Section removed early

== Tramcars ==
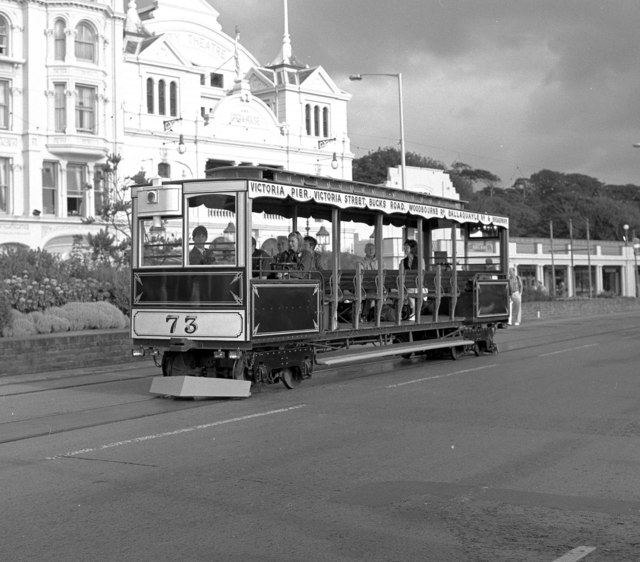
Preserved car 72/73

There were fifteen trams on the system. Tram 72/73 is now based at the Jurby Transport Museum. After closure it is believed that a number of cars (including those which remain) were offered for sale and other uses, therefore the scrapping date is largely conjectural. The colour scheme is believed to have been that carried by the restored 72/73 today, being Prussian Blue panelling with cream panelling, lemon yellow detailing and brown/chocolate lettering; this distinctively included all major destinations of the route along the upper valence which has been accurately reproduced on the displayed car today. The three lowest numbered cars were later additions, the fleet numbering commenced at 70 upon opening to allow for possible expansion of the Douglas Bay Horse Tramway fleet which never occurred (the highest number horse car was in reality 50), later cars were allocated unused numbers thereafter.

Key:	Scrapped	On Display

No.	Built	Builder	Layout	Seats	Scrap	Location & Notes
67	1911	Thomas Milnes- Voss & Co., Ltd.	Open; Crossbench	84	c.1930	Retrospectively Numbered; See Notes Above
68	1909	Thomas Milnes- Voss & Co., Ltd.	Open; Crossbench	48	c.1930	Retrospectively Numbered; See Notes Above
69	1907	The United Electric; Car Co., Ltd.	Open; Crossbench	44	c.1930	Retrospectively Numbered; See Notes Above
70	1907	The United Electric; Car Co., Ltd.	Open; Crossbench	44	c.1930	Retrospectively Numbered; See Notes Above
71	1896	G. F. Milnes & Co.	Open; Crossbench	38	c.1930	First Car Supplied; See Note Above
72	1896	G. F. Milnes & Co.	Open; Crossbench	38	~	Jurby Transport Museum; Open Seasonally
73	1896	G. F. Milnes & Co.	Open; Crossbench	38	~	Jurby Transport Museum; Open Seasonally
74	1896	G. F. Milnes & Co.	Open; Crossbench	38	c.1930	Part Of Initial Batch; One Of Seven Supplied
75	1896	G. F. Milnes & Co.	Open; Crossbench	38	c.1930	Part Of Initial Batch; One Of Seven Supplied
76	1896	G. F. Milnes & Co.	Open; Crossbench	38	c.1930	Part Of Initial Batch; One Of Seven Supplied
77	1935	G. F. Milnes & Co.	Open; Crossbench	38	c.1930	Rebuilt 1903 As Saloon; Drop In Capacity (34)
78	1896	G. F. Milnes & Co.	Open; Crossbench	38	c.1930	Rebuilt 1904 As Saloon; Drop In Capacity (34)
79	1911	G. F. Milnes & Co.	Open-Fronted; Saloon	32	c.1930	Final Batch Supplied; Final Batch Of Three
80	1911	G. F. Milnes & Co.	Open-Fronted; Saloon	32	c.1930	Final Batch Supplied; Final Batch Of Three
81	1911	G. F. Milnes & Co.	Open-Fronted; Saloon	32	c.1930	Final Car Supplied; Final Batch Of Three

=== Preserved car ===
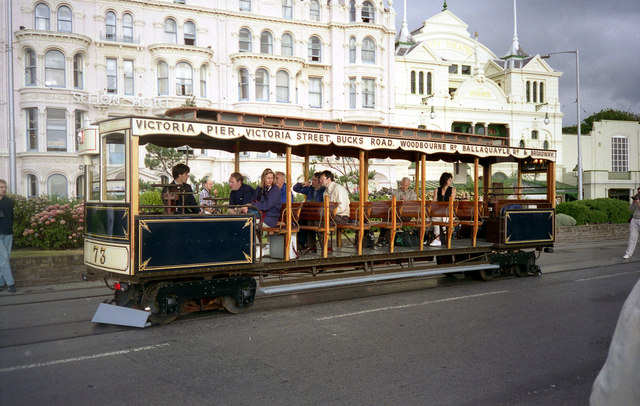
Preserved Car 72/73 Douglas Promenade

After the closure of the line, two of the cars, No.72 and No.73 were turned into a bungalow at Crawyn, Jurby. Both vehicles retained their bogies. and were parked side by side to create the floorspace, a brick built chimney installed between then. They had been built by G. F. Milnes in 1896. In late July 1968, these two vehicles were rescued by the Douglas Cable Car Group, and a restoration was carried out between then and 1976, at York Road depot (former storage shed for the tramway, later used for buses and horse tram storage), using the best of both cars. The tram now bears the number 72 on one end and 73 on the other, it has been converted to work by battery power and was sometimes seen running on the horse tramway. It was later moved to the Jurby Transport Museum where it remains today on an isolated section of reproduction track together with smaller items from the system also on display.

== Stamp ==
The Upper Douglas Cable Tramway featured on a 13p stamp issued by the Isle of Man Post Office in 1988, as part of a series depicting various railways on the island.
