= South Shields Tramways =

Tramway service in South Shields, England

Operation
- Locale: South Shields
- Open: 1 August 1883
- Close: 31 January 1906
- Status: Closed

Infrastructure
- Track gauge: 3 ft 6 in (1,067 mm)
- Propulsion system: Horse

Statistics
- Route length: 2.53 miles (4.07 km)

The South Shields Tramways operated a tramway service in South Shields between 1883 and 1906.

== History ==
The South Shields Tramways were constructed by South Shields Corporation. The services were operated under a lease by South Shields Tramways Company. Services started on 1 August 1883.

By 1886 the company was in financial difficulty, and services stopped on 30 April. The tramcars were sold in an auction to the Douglas Bay Horse Tramway. Tramcar 14 is in the Manx Museum and 18 still operates on the Douglas system (both Double Deckers)

On 28 March 1887, a new lease arranged by the corporation with the South Shields Tramways and Carriage Company enabled services to restart.

== Closure ==
The company was taken over in 1899 by British Electric Traction in expectation that it would be allowed to modernise and electrify the services. However, it withdrew and the new tramway opened, operated by South Shields Corporation Tramways.
