= Cliff railways in the Isle of Man =

There have been five cliff railways in the Isle of Man, none of which remain operational. Usually referred to as 'cliff lifts', they were all railways, having wheeled carriages running on weight-bearing rails. The two Falcon lifts served the same hotel at different periods (and in different locations); the first Falcon lift was moved to become the Port Soderick lift, at the south end of the Douglas Southern Electric Tramway, with the Douglas Head lift at its north end. The Browside lift served the Laxey Wheel.

== Locations and map ==
| Point | Coordinates (Links to map resources) | OS Grid Ref | Notes |
|---|---|---|---|
| First Falcon Cliff Lift (closed) | 54.1635°N 4.4708°W | SC38787700 | |
| Second Falcon Cliff Lift (closed) | 54.1633°N 4.4716°W | SC38737698 | |
| Douglas Head Funicular Railway (closed) | 54.1439°N 4.4675°W | SC38927482 | |
| Laxey Browside Tramway (closed) | 54.2380°N 4.4079°W | SC43178515 | |
| Port Soderick Cliff Lift (closed) | 54.1240°N 4.5304°W | SC34737275 | |

== Lifts at the Falcon Cliff Hotel ==
Falcon Cliff was a large residence, dating from the 1840s, at the top of the cliff overlooking Douglas Bay. By 1887 it was converted to a hotel and entertainment complex. Two distinct cliff railways were built to carry customers between the hotel and the road along the sea-front.

=== First Falcon Cliff lift ===
The first lift was built in 1887 by Mr T. Cain, as a funicular with two parallel 4 ft (1,219 mm) gauge tracks. It was 218 feet (66 m) long, rising 110 feet (34 m) on a gradient of 1:1.98. The cars may have been water-balanced, or driven by the same oil engine later used at Port Soderick. The cabins had a level base (as seen on photographs after they were converted to kiosks at Port Soderick). (Note: The cars can be seen, converted to kiosks, standing together in the foreground of this picture of Port Soderick:)

The lift was under-used, and was sold in 1896 to the Forrester family to be moved to Port Soderick.

=== Second Falcon Cliff lift ===
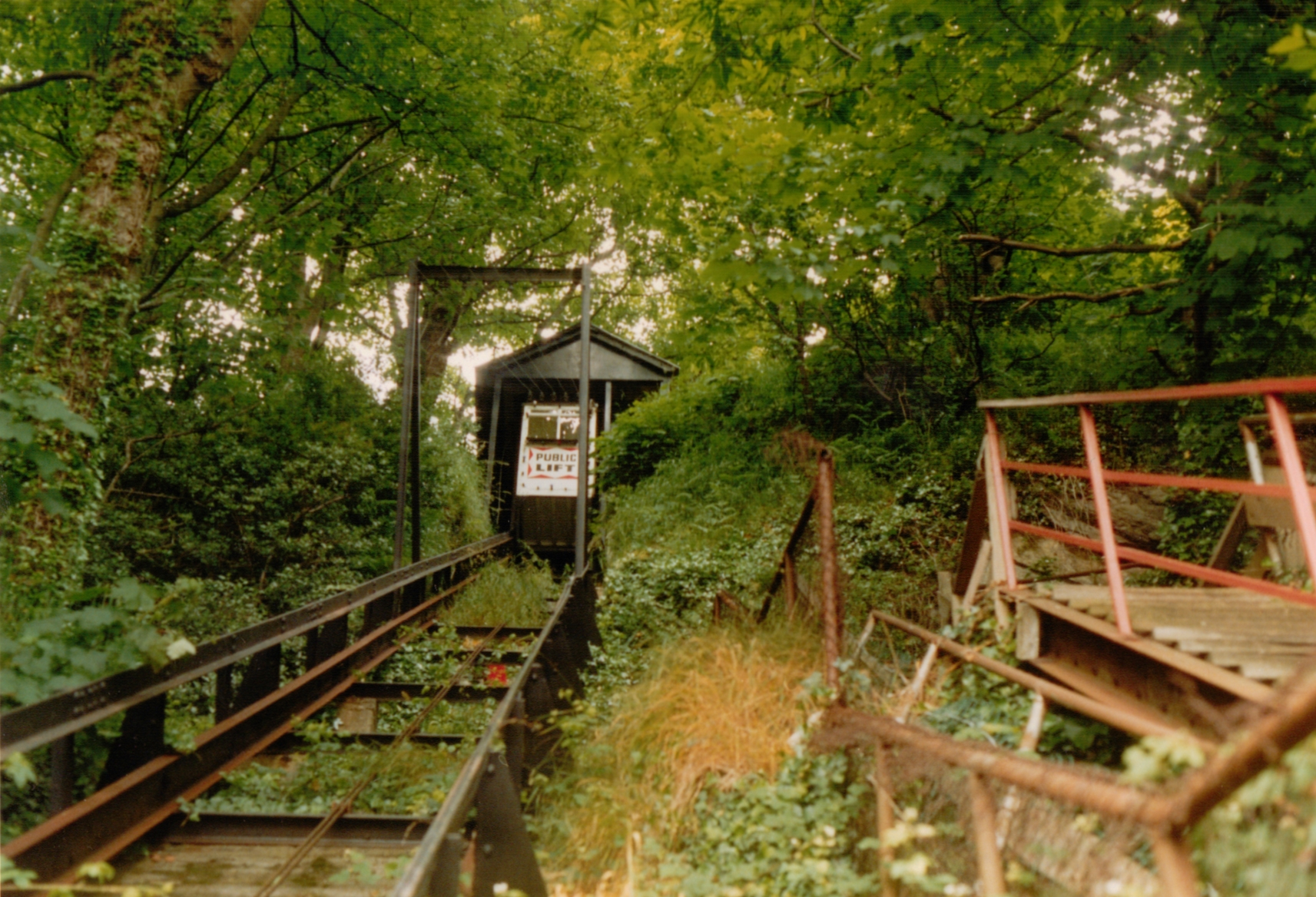
The second Falcon Cliff Lift in 1991, after closure

The second railway to serve the hotel was built in 1927 on a different alignment to the first; the line started at the end of a short cul-de-sac off the Esplanade, and led to the other side of the hotel building. It had a single 129 feet (39 m) track of 5 ft (1,524 mm) gauge, at an angle of 60° (1 in 0.57) or 41° (1 in 1.15). Powered at first by a 400V DC 6 electric horsepower (4.5 kW) motor, it was changed in 1950 to a 415V AC motor of the same power.

The line closed in 1990. As of 2007 it remained in situ, though overgrown and inaccessible.

== Port Soderick Cliff Lift ==
This was built in 1897–8 using some of the hardware of the first Falcon Cliff Lift. It provided an easy route between the southern terminus of the Douglas Southern Electric Tramway and the beach-level hotel and amusements of Port Soderick. The track was re-erected, again as a 4 ft (1,219 mm) gauge double track funicular, but this time on a wooden trestle supported by stone pillars. Two new cars with sloping or stepped floors were used. The length was unchanged at 66 metres (217 ft), but laid on a gentler gradient (1:2.2) than at Falcon Cliff. It was powered by an oil engine.

It closed about the same time as the Electric Tramway in 1939, and was dismantled in 1947–9.

== Laxey Browside Tramway ==
This mysterious (Note: "...less is known about this short-lived line than any of the other cliff railways of the British Isles...".) line was built in 1890 to allow tourists more comfortable access to the Laxey Wheel. It was a double 5 ft (1,524 mm) gauge water-driven funicular, running for 300 feet (91 m) at a gradient of 1 in 4 from just downhill of the Laxey Wheel to the valley floor below. The cars were in toastrack form, with seven or eight benches holding three passengers each. The floor of each car was kept level by mounting them on much larger wheels at the downhill end than at the other.

It closed either in 1906 or in 1914 at the start of World War I, and nothing now remains of the rails or stations.

== Douglas Head Funicular Railway ==
Four years after the opening of the Douglas Southern Electric Tramway, this funicular railway was built to carry passengers between the harbour and the northern terminus of the DSET. Also referred to as the Douglas Head Incline Railway, or the Douglas Head Cliff Railway, it was constructed by Richard Maltby Broadbent, with two 4 ft (1,219 mm) gauge tracks running 450 feet (140 m) from harbour level at Port Skillion up a 1 in 4.5 gradient to near the DSET terminus. It was powered by an oil engine. The tracks were not quite parallel but splayed out as they climbed to allow the cars room to pass each other; unusually, the tracks bent to the left (going up) a third of the way from the bottom. The cars each had ten benches, seating four persons, arranged in back-to-back pairs, and stepped so that the uphill-facing bench of each pair was level with the downhill-facing bench of the next.

It ran only in the summer, closing during WW I and from WW II until 1949. It closed after the 1953 season, following the closure of the DSET in 1939 and the introduction of a bus service to the top of Douglas Head in 1950. The tracks were lifted in 1955 to be re-used by the Manx Electric Railway near Ramsey.

It is the only cliff railway in Britain to have appeared on a British postage stamp: the Isle of Man Post Office 5p definitive of 1988.

== See also ==
- Rail transport in the Isle of Man
