= Rail transport in Honduras =

Railroads in Honduras were built in late 19th and early 20th centuries by two competing U.S. corporations, United Fruit (Tela Railroad Company) and Standard Fruit (later nationalized). All were in the Caribbean coastal area and never reached the capital. In 1993, the combined network had 785 km (488 mi). As of 2006, only three separate segments remain in operation (totalling 67 km or 42 mi) under the management of FNH - Ferrocarril Nacional de Honduras:

- San Pedro Sula - Puerto Cortes (50 km or 31 mi, freight trains carrying mainly lumber)
- City rail in La Ceiba (3 km or 1.9 mi, passenger transport between downtown and a western suburb, Col. Sitramacsa)
- Line between La Unión (a village near La Ceiba) and Parque Nacional Cuero y Salado (Refugio de vida silvestre Cuero y Salado) (9 km or 5.6 mi, transport of coconuts to a processing plant and of tourists to national park
- In late 2010, a commuter/tourist train was established in San Pedro Sula.

== History ==
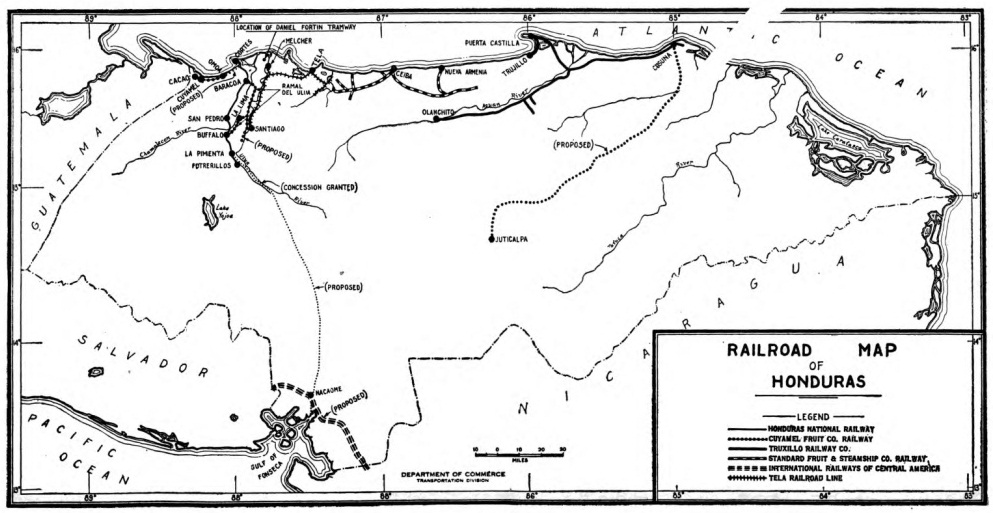
Rail map as of 1925

From the middle of the 19th century, the rulers of the newly formed State of Honduras were considering the realization of a railway project that would be transportation for the government and the population. On June 23, 1853, when General José Trinidad Cabañas was president, he signed the first contract for the construction of a railroad that would cross Honduras from North to South. And what would be worth for the use of ports between the Gulf of Fonseca in the Pacific Ocean and the coasts of the Caribbean Sea, in turn the transport of goods, such as migrants. The idea was put on the table for conversations. An American construction company was hired to carry out the work; but, a coup d’état perpetrated by General Juan López Aguirre, which would remove President Cabañas from the administration frustrated both the idea and its continuity. Later, with the country already being a republic, in 1868 and under the presidency of General José María Medina, this attempt to continue with the national inter-oceanic railway project which would follow the following route.

"It would start in Puerto Caballos (Puerto Cortés) and after crossing the Llano de Sula (Sula Valley) and crossing the Ulúa River, at the height of the town of Santiago, it would continue along the banks of the Humuya River and would reach the valley of Comayagua passing through the colonial city and capital of the nation and would continue south along the banks of the Goascorán River to conclude in the Gulf of Fonseca".

For such an adventure, Medina contacted the plenipotentiary ambassador of Honduras in Europe, Attorney Carlos Gutiérrez who, together with the French-born Mr. Jean Víctor Herrán Note 3, moved to England to hold talks with the English kingdom and thus finance the work through a loan.

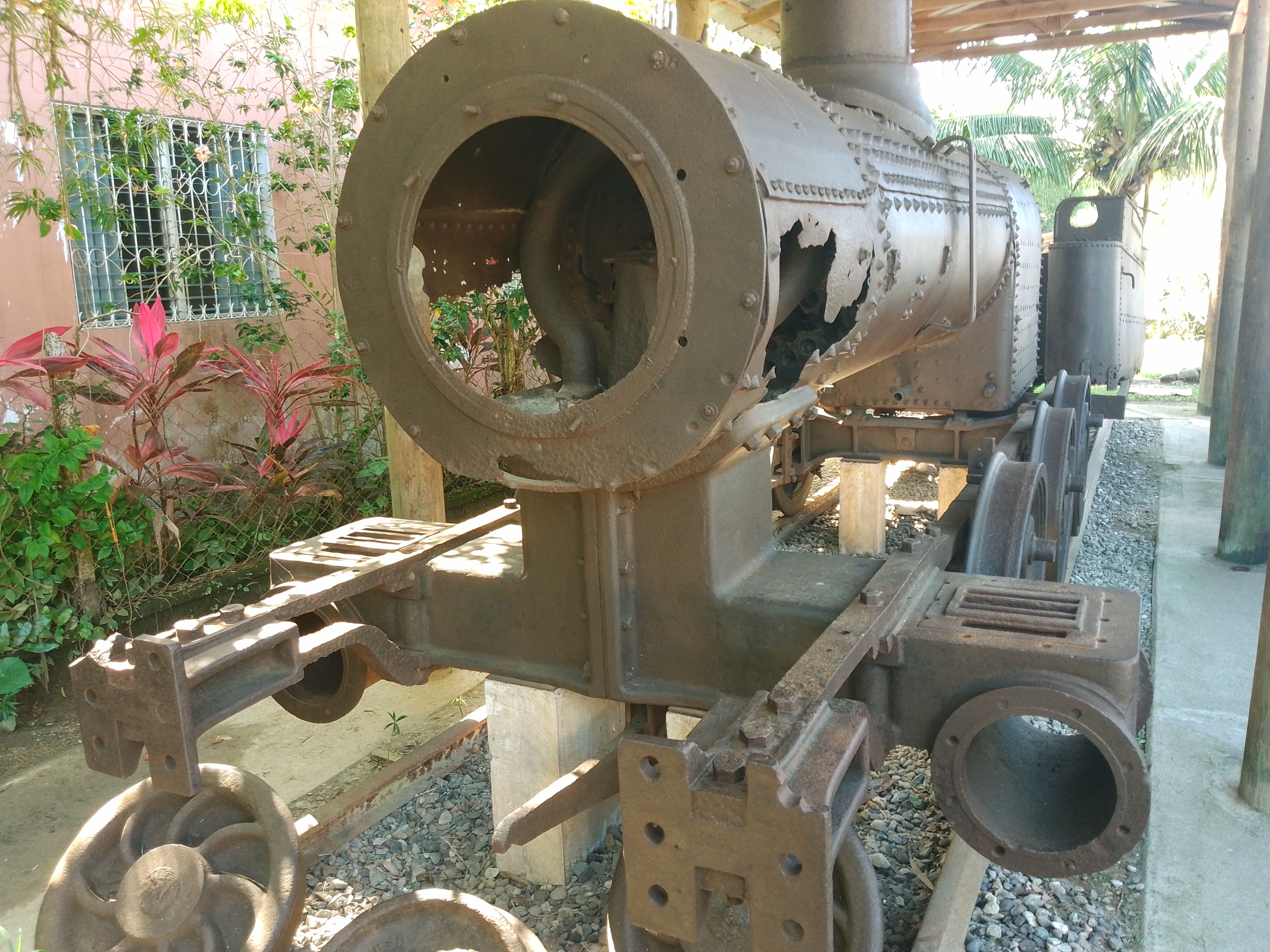
The oldest locomotive still preserved in Honduras exposed in the museum of the fortress of Omoa

The idea was similar, to build the railways between Puerto Cortés and the Gulf of Fonseca. In 1867 the Honduran representatives were successful in contracting four loans: The first two were from the Bischoffsheim House and the Goldschmidt House located in the city of London, which agreed to deliver four million pounds sterling, with 10% of interest. On February 20, 1868, President José María Medina signed the government decree for the construction of the railway and for this he contracted the American businessman William Mcandlish and company for said work and to whom the diplomat Carlos Gutiérrez claimed to have delivered 50,000 pounds sterling on date 10 November 1868, that is why on January 18, 1869, the engineer Enrique O'Hagans would arrive in Omoa to carry out the operations of territorial study, location of equipment, relocation of houses, etc. In the month of December of the same year, three ships left the English shores containing materials and rails. Supposedly in 1869 in France the Parisian houses: Dreyfus, Scheyer and Company, gave the rest of the money loaned by the government of Honduras. Although, of all that money, the government coffers only received only 300,000 British Pounds, since the European bankers saw a way to collect the interest of a good payer, in the same way other money was used to pay the diplomatic representatives.

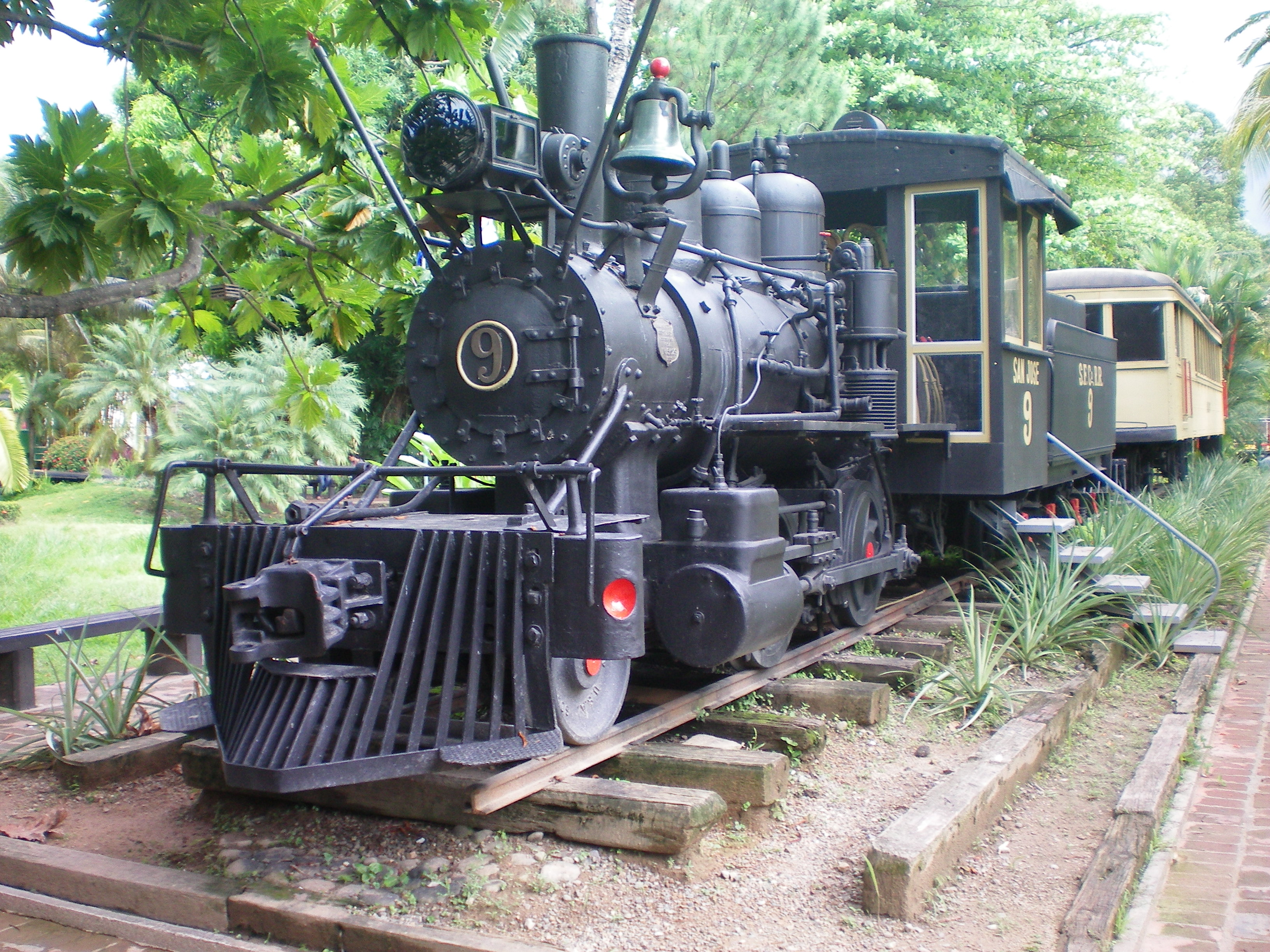
One of the oldest steam trains in Honduras

At the end of it all, the national territory was submerged in a civil war and with only one section of the railway built and in January 1870, the acting Minister of Foreign Affairs, Mr. Francisco Alvarado, had reported that the section would be completed by November of the year. in progress, but it did not count on the construction of a bridge over the lagoon and thus connect the pier with the section, which delayed the delivery that would not be effective until April 16, 1870. Then on July 20, the American James C. Madeley, gave a report on the progress of the works and mentioned that 45 miles (72 kilometres) of forest had been cleared for the section, the completion of the Choloma bridge and the Río Blanco bridge that concluded on July 23; Likewise, 8 miles (13 kilometres) of rails have been placed and on which a small manual locomotive already travels, there are cuttings around twenty-nine thousand sleepers and that two ships carrying two locomotives and material for the iron bridge that were being built would dock in the port. on the Chamelecón River and for the section that would cross San Pedro Sula.

On July 30, 1870, the engineer James Bryson informed the government of President José María Medina that the two locomotives had disembarked and were ready to be mounted on the rails and put to the test, they were called "Medina". In the same month and year, in San Pedro Sula the "Medina" locomotive was circulating along with a "first class" car and other wagons, by December 1870 the locomotives (three in total) were working at full steam spanning Puerto Cortés, San Pedro Sula, Potrerillos and Villa Medina.

=== Debt scandal ===
Under the presidency always of Captain General José María Medina, the creation and circulation of a new official currency in Honduras was given by decree, the Honduran peso of nickel material due to its low esteem within the economic market, this was devalued and the creditors of the borrowing houses so much from France that at first they agreed, it turned against them since the government of Honduras could not pay. The English accountant Robert Watts in a meeting suggested on August 3, 1875, to protect the English bonds and guarantee the payment of the debt and its interests; For this, the Honduran territory had to be sold or leased, to its most probable buyer, the United States of America, and thus the bank creditors would compensate their investment.

This reached the Courts of Justice of France, where the magistrates would condemn the House of Dreyfus for the crime of Improper Handling of Loans. Honduras was governed by Doctor Marco Aurelio Soto who on November 8, 1876, decided to suppress the London legation under Gutiérrez, as well as that of Paris in the hands of Víctor Herrán; For this, the inheritance of this debt would also be carried by his successors and the Railroad operated normally despite only having 100 kilometers (62 mi). In 1878, President Soto empowered General Luis Bográn to travel to Europe to gather the necessary information and carry out an exhaustive investigation and face the responsibilities for all the speculations carried out with the funds derived from the contracted loans, which led to the following year A decree was issued calling those responsible for such loans to account.

The Decree established as a procedure the integration of a special committee, so that in the month of August of the same year, Adolfo Zuñiga, Carlos Ernesto Bernhard and Miguel A. Lardizabal, Mr. Policarpo Bonilla and Mr. Julio Lozano were appointed in secretary quality. However, Messrs. Herrán and Gutiérrez did not appear to make statements and the investigation was stalled.

=== Banana republic ===
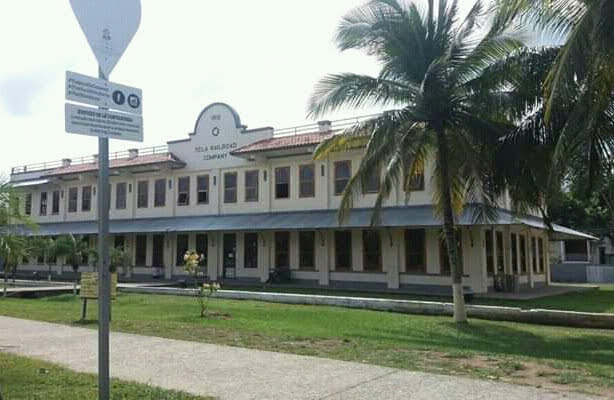
The Tela rail Road Company building today contains a museum.

Starting in the 20th century, The Vaccaro Brothers Company, or "Los Hermanos Vaccaro", was a family of Italian origin who traded bananas in New Orleans. This company received land concessions on the north coast of Honduras. In return, concessionaires had to build rail lines over a large area. The lands were granted according to the number of kilometers (0.62 miles) of railroad that each company built, establishing, for example, for each 250 hectares per kilometer (990 acres per mile) of railway. The Vaccaro Brothers Company, as other concessionaires on the north coast did later, took advantage of the privileges granted by the concessions to export bananas from the port city of La Ceiba.

The 785 kilometers (488 miles) of railways were originally built by the banana companies and consist of two separate systems with different gauges. The largest system, with almost 600 kilometers (370 miles) of track, was built by the Standard Fruit Company. Subsequently, it was decided to request a loan between the government and the Sula Agricultural Company for the amount of US$1 million to repair, build new sections and acquire new equipment, due to this the Cuyamel Fruit Company subsidiary of The Tela Railroad Company would benefit by accepting a transfer made by the Sula Agricultural Company and thus by Government Decree No. 4 dated April 17, 1920, the Cuyamel Fruit Co. would go on to administer the National Railroad, which would once again be of the government since 1983.

Previously on February 24, 1920, the Honduran government granted a concession for the construction, maintenance and exploitation of the railway in the Department of Colón, between the same and the company represented by William N. Zuber in favor of Carmelo D’Antoni and published in La Gaceta No. 5318.

== Honduran national railroad ==
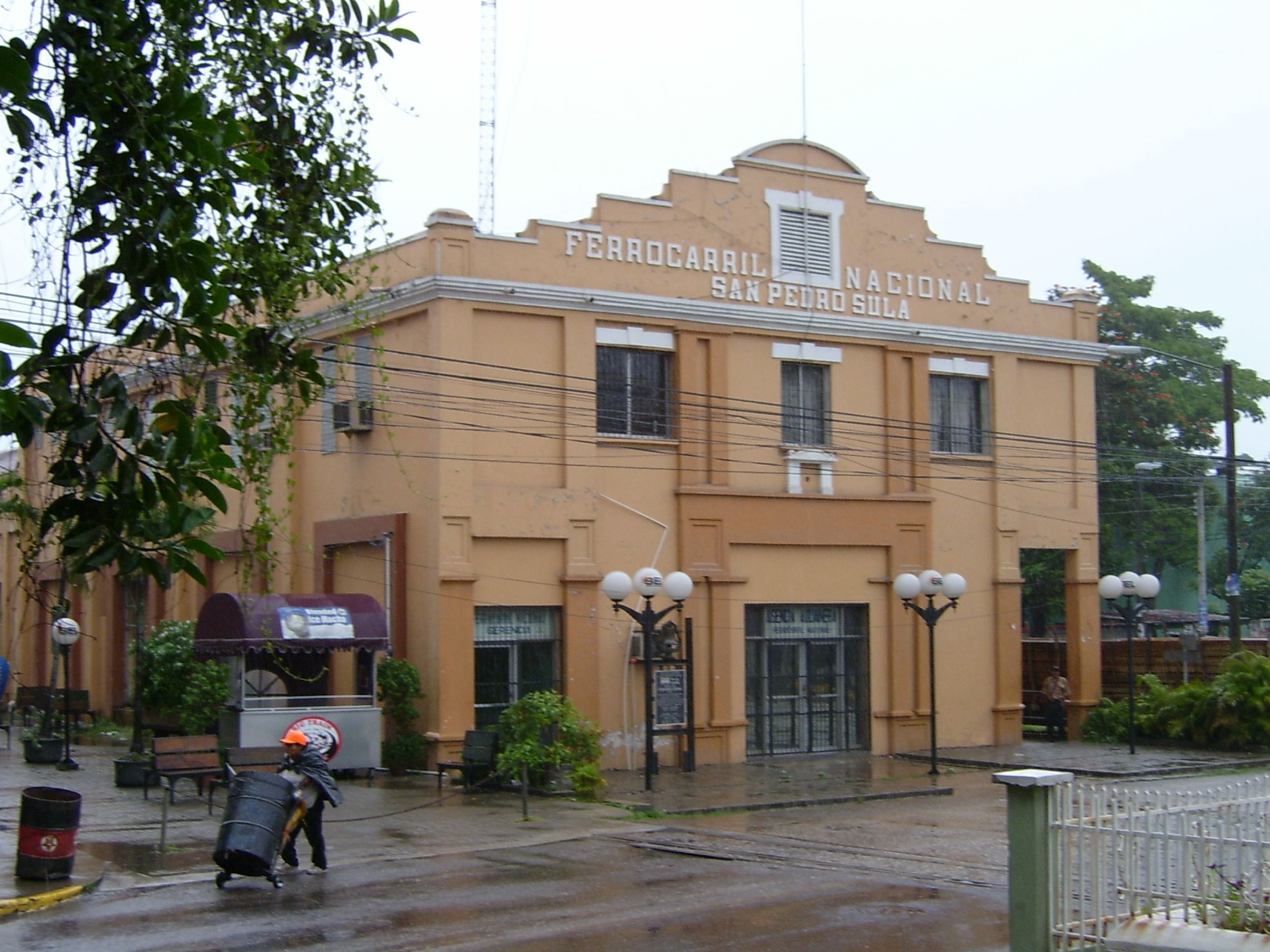
San Pedro Sula Train Station today

The railway was first equipped with 30 steam locomotives, and among others with more than 600 cars to transport bananas and other freights, 22 cars to transport passengers, 13 tank cars to transport oil and molasses, 59 ballasts and 45 railcars.

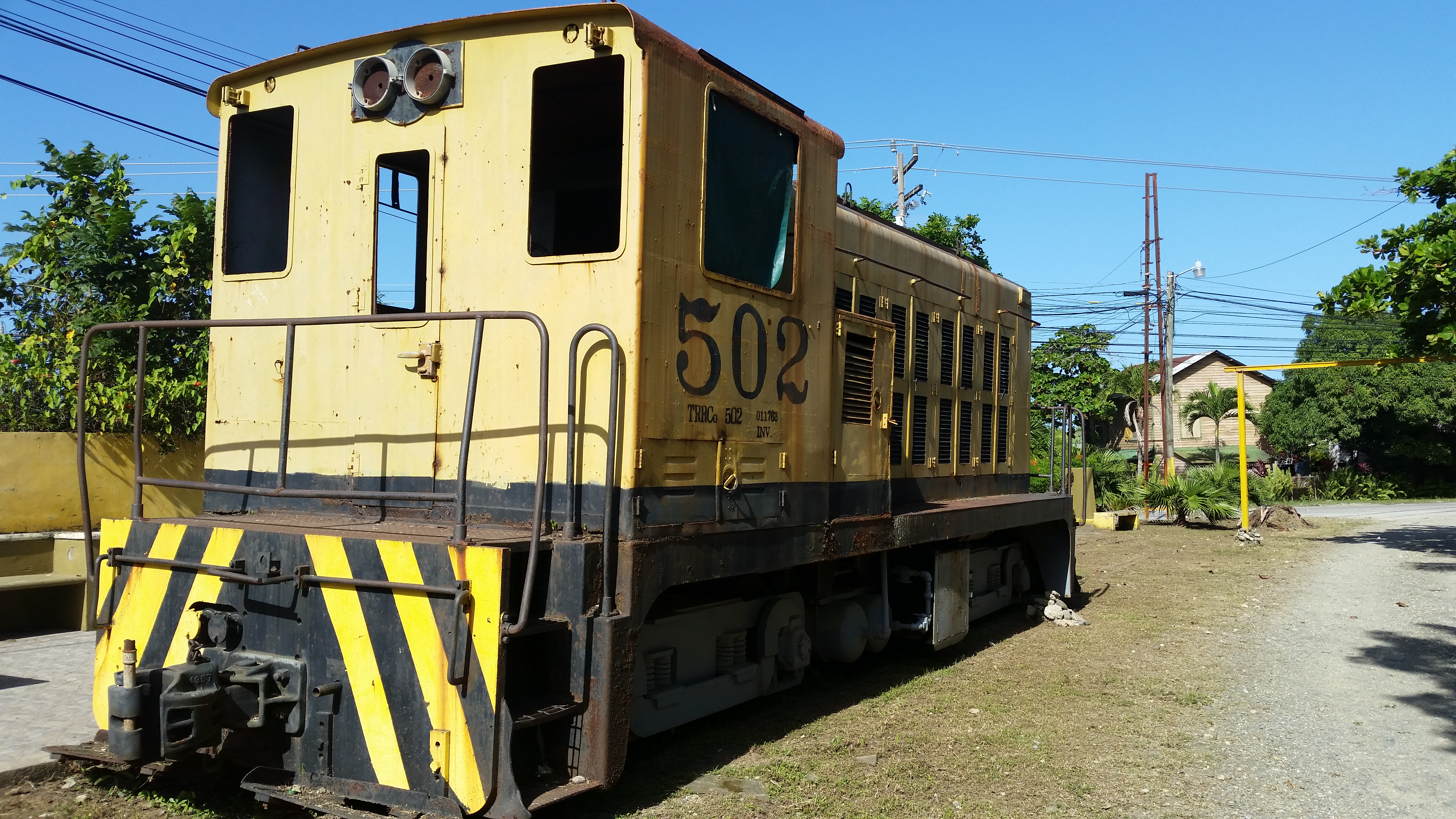
An old locomotive in Puerto Cortes

By 1930, more than 13 steam locomotives, 16 wagons, 3 first-class cars, 2 second-class cars, 3 baggage cars, 2 cabooses, 2 tank cars, 61 banana transport cars, 12 platforms, 1 tram were acquired. urban, 2 carts to transport ice, 39 carts to transport cane and 2 camps. In the early 1960s all steam locomotives were replaced by diesel electric machines. Since 1952 there has been no real significant increase in rolling equipment endowments in any of the railway companies by the Honduran government. This entailed that all the acquired locomotives were donated and bought from foreign countries.

Although, thanks to the support of the private sector, they were able to acquire several diesel locomotives and rail buses. The national railway started from Puerto Cortés, crossed the Sula Valley and ended in Potrerillos, being an approximate distance of 95 kilometers and 10 stations. With branches to the town of El Progreso, La Lima and the port of Tela. In 2004 passenger trains were canceled, leaving only to transport cargo.In 1952, the significant increase in the provision of rolling stock in any of the railway companies by the Honduran government began to gradually stop, plus there was aid for the maintenance of the machines, which is why the national railway ended up being financed almost entirely by the Honduran government. private sector, which managed to keep it in good shape by providing an efficient public transport service until the 1990s, buying new machines such as changing steam locomotives to diesel and acquiring more rail buses that made trips from Puerto Cortes, passing through San Pedro Sula and Tela, one being of the Japanese brand Nippon Sharyo model 1967, which operated until the 2000s.

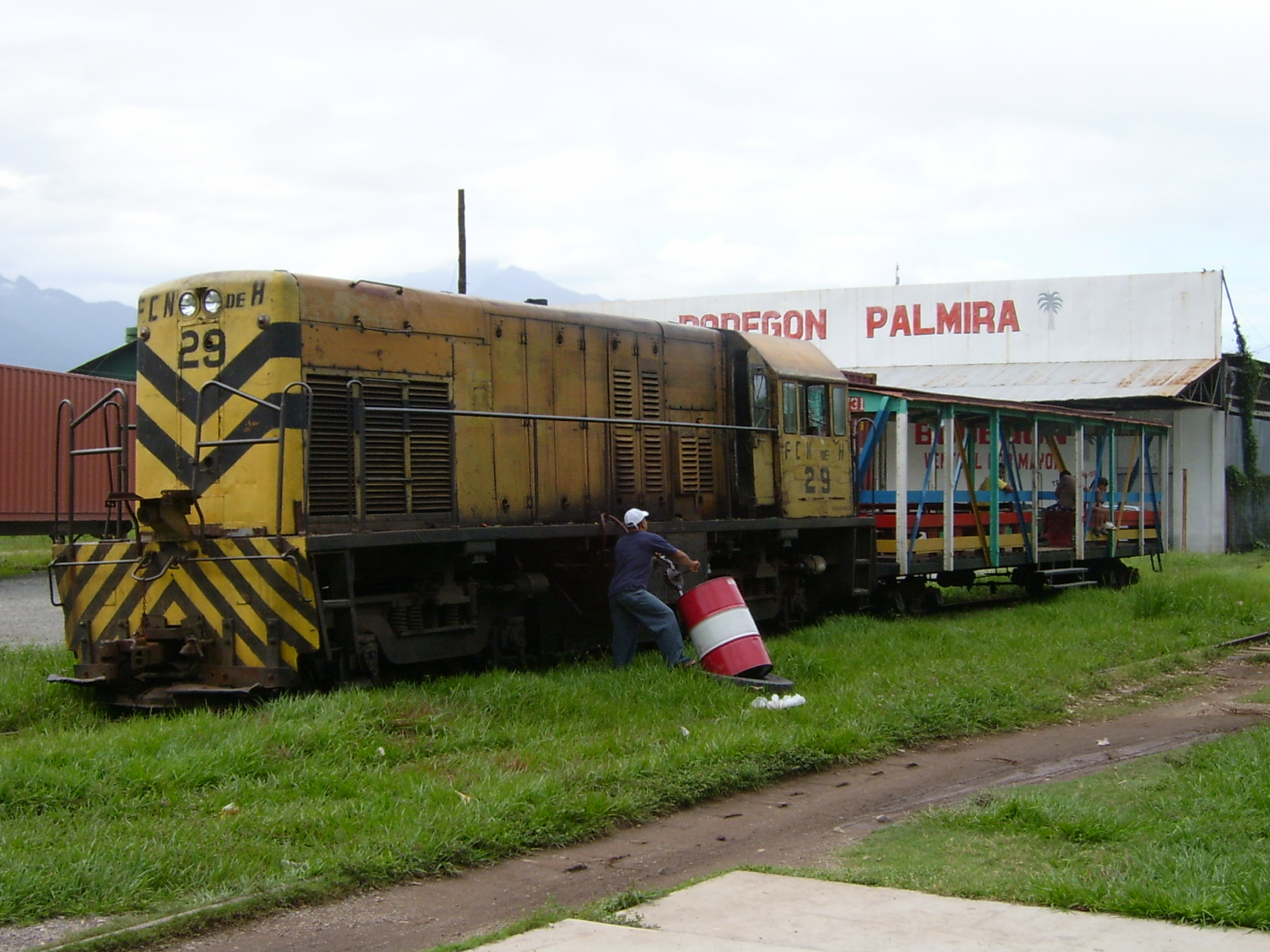
Passenger train in La Ceiba. Engineer tanks fuel manually from a barrel. Colorful passenger car (former box car without walls) is attached to the right.

Line	Station	Distance
1	Puerto Cortés	0
1	La Laguna	3
1	Chameleconcito	13
1	Campana	17
1	Baracoa/Empalme Línea 2	20,5
1	Baracoa	21,2
1	Río Blanquito	28,5
1	Río Bijao	32,5
1	Choloma	43,5
1	Río Blanco	55
1	San Pedro Sula	60
1	San Pedro Sula/Estación Metropolitana	63
1	Chamelecón	69
1	Búfalo	73
1	Villanueva	83
1	Pimienta	90
1	Potrerillos	95

Line	Station	Distance
2	Baracoa/Empalme Línea1	0
2	Baracoa	6
2	La Junta	10
2	Dora	12
2	Toloa Creek	12,5
2	Toloa/ Empalme	23
2	Finca Turn Bull	
2	Villafranca	
2	La Unión	
2	La Fortuna	
2	Agua Blanca	
2	Uluita	
2	"Kilómetro No. 15"	41
2	"Kilómetro No. 13"	45
2	"Kilómetro 10"	48
2	Puerto Arturo	50
2	Las Brisas	
2	Tela nueva	57
2	Tela vieja	58

Line	Station	Distance
1A	La Ceiba	0
1A	Parada 1	0,5
1A	Parada 2	1
1A	Parada 3	2
1A	La Ceiba (Barrio Occidente)	3
1A	Estación de Tela	104

== Historic network ==
The following table shows the main rail network at its historic extent and is based on the source works with additional original research. Details of the plantation railways are vague. An incomplete series of 1:50,000 maps are held by / published online by The University of Texas under the Perry-Castañeda Library (PCL) Map Collection website.

Table of historic railway network
Location	Section Distance (km)	Cumulative Distance (km)	Note	Co-ordinates
The numerous branches are not detailed below, nor are the numerous and often substantial plantation networks.
Ferrocarril de Cuyamel Fruit Co
'base west'	0.00	0.00	in Guatemala, approximate extent from historic map	15°34'00.7"N 88°27'40.1"W
Jimerto	5.13	5.13	in Guatemala	
Guatemala / Honduras border	1.60	6.73	approx 8 km of line inside Guatemala, closed 1923	15°37'06.4"N 88°20'40.8"W
Cuyamelito	2.89	9.62		15°36'49.3"N 88°19'05.4"W
Buena Vista	18.78	28.40		15°41'25.3"N 88°10'53.7"W
Vera Cruz				
Chachahualilla				
Omoa	22.08	50.48		15°46'40.2"N 88°02'45.5"W
Historia de los ferrocarriles de Iberoamérica gives 89 km of main line and 125 km of plantation branches. Branches may include those served by Ramal de Ulua (see below).
Ferrocarril Nacional de Honduras, originally Ferrocarril Interoceanico
Puerto Cortes (a)	0.00	0.00	measured to extent shown on historic maps	15°51'19.8"N 87°57'33.6"W
Puerto Cortes (b)	5.65	5.65	east exit from port	15°49'44.9"N 87°55'39.3"W
Baracoa Empalme	17.35	23.00	junction, line east: Ramal de Ulua	15°46'39.2"N 87°51'00.6"W
Bufalo	54.17	77.17	junction, line east: Ramal de Ulua	15°24'08.7"N 88°00'07.6"W
Blanco Wye	19.83	97.00	junction, branch west to Potrerillos	15°14'24.3"N 87°56'58.3"W
Higuerito Central	5.70	102.70	junction, branch east via Mandador	15°11'34.5"N 87°56'03.7"W
El Llano	8.14	110.84	junction, branch west via Mandador	15°10'44.7"N 87°53'21.5"W
Santa Rita	1.91	112.7.5	continues as Tela Railroad	15°11'44.3"N 87°53'33.8"W
Historia de los ferrocarriles de Iberoamérica gives a total of 197 km including 50 km 'ramales clandestinos' in the Guanchias area.
Ramal de Ulua (Cuyamel Fruit Company) - line runs on the west side of the Rio Ulua
Baracoa Empalme	0	0	junction, north / south: Ferrocarril Nacional de Honduras	15°46'39.2"N 87°51'00.6"W
La Junta	8.32	8.32	junction, south: Tela Railroad	15°42'57.7"N 87°49'02.2"W
Travesia Junction	43.85	52.17	junction, south: plantations in Omonita area	15°26'11.2"N 87°54'17.2"W
Bufalo	12.19	64.36	junction, north / south: Ferrocarril Nacional de Honduras	15°24'08.7"N 88°00'07.6"W
Historia de los ferrocarriles de Iberoamérica gives a total of 166 km.
Tela Railroad (Cuyamel Fruit Company then United Fruit) - line runs on the east side of the Rio Ulua
Santa Rita	0	0	continuation from Ferrocarril Nacional de Honduras	15°11'44.3"N 87°53'33.8"W
El Progresso	29.36	29.36		15°23'45.5"N 87°48'43.7"W
Urraco Empalme	30.28	59.64		15°36'26.7"N 87°45'38.6"W
La Curva / La Fragua	11.50	71.14	junction, north: link to Ramal de Ulua (see note below)	15°41'33.6"N 87°48'21.0"W
Toloa Empalme	9.02	80.16		15°43'45.3"N 87°45'29.6"W
Tela Vieja	38.00	118.16	vicinity of Standard Fruit Company Linea Occidental (break of gauge)	15°46'44.3"N 87°27'31.2"W
Historia de los ferrocarriles de Iberoamérica gives 133 km of main line and 327 km of plantation branches.
In 1935 a bridge was constructed over the Rio Ulua, this connected the Ramal de Ulua (at La Junta) and the Tela Railroad (at La Curva). Line approximately 2.5 km.
Standard Fruit Company ex Vaccaro Brothers: Linea Occidental
Tela	0.00	0.00	vicinity of Tela Railroad (break of gauge)	15°46'44.3"N 87°27'31.2"W
La Ceiba	98.00	98.00	continues as Linea Oriental	15°47'18.7"N 86°47'42.4"W
Standard Fruit Company ex Vaccaro Brothers: Linea Oriental
La Ceiba	0.00	0.00	commences as Linea Occidental	15°47'18.7"N 86°47'42.4"W
Jutiapa	35.00	35.00	junction, north east: Balfate	15°44'34.5"N 86°30'26.7"W
Los Planes	35.00	70.00	junction, north: Sonaguera	15°34'40.1"N 86°18'38.4"W
Sonambula			junction, south to Elixir	15°34'10.0"N 86°17'22.2"W
Loop Junction	9.00	79.00	junction, east: plantation lines	15°33'16.4"N 86°14'01.9"W
Elixir			junction, north from Sonambula	15°31'53.0"N 86°16'38.5"W
El Cruce	33.0	112.00	junction, south loop via Las Trojas junction, Trujillo Railroad	15°28'00.4"N 86°32'44.6"W
Coyoles	13.00	125.00	junction, south loop via Las Trojas	15°26'57.9"N 86°39'58.3"W
San Lorenzo	25.00	150.00		15°24'22.0"N 86°51'13.2"W
Historia de los ferrocarriles de Iberoamérica gives 118 km main line and 448 km plantation branches.
Trujillo Railroad (United Fruit) - distances are very approximate
Puerto Castilla	0.00	0.00		16°00'28.7"N 85°58'11.7"W
Corocito	42.00	42.00	junction, east: line to Cusuna and beyond	15°46'33.8"N 85°47'38.0"W
(junction)	92.00	134.00	junction, west and north: Standard Fruit Company	15°27'29.6"N 86°32'16.5"W
line continued north via El Cruce to Olanchito, merged with Standard Fruit Company in 1932
Corocito	0.00	0.00	junction, north / south: Puerto Castilla to Olanchito line	15°46'33.8"N 85°47'38.0"W
Cusuna	71.00	71.00		15°53'19.4"N 85°13'21.0"W
Sico	37.00	108.00	last named passenger station, line continued	15°48'45.6"N 85°06'15.0"W
Historia de los ferrocarriles de Iberoamérica gives 153 km of main lines and 290 km of plantation branches. A map of the line is available on the Library of Congress website

== Interoceanic project ==
In 2013 it was announced that the Honduran Government and the China Harbour Engineering Company (CCEC) were interested in building a transoceanic railroad. The governments of Honduras and the People's Republic of China plan to build a naval port on the island of Tigre in the Municipality of Amapala that would be the main one in unloading and loading of goods, which will be conducted by a new railway line, which would cross the departments of Valle, El Paraíso, Olancho and Colón, to the north coast, thus avoiding ships crossing the Panama Canal.

== See also ==
- Honduras
- Rail transport by country
