= Queen's Pier, Ramsey =

Pier on the Isle of Man

Queen's Pier
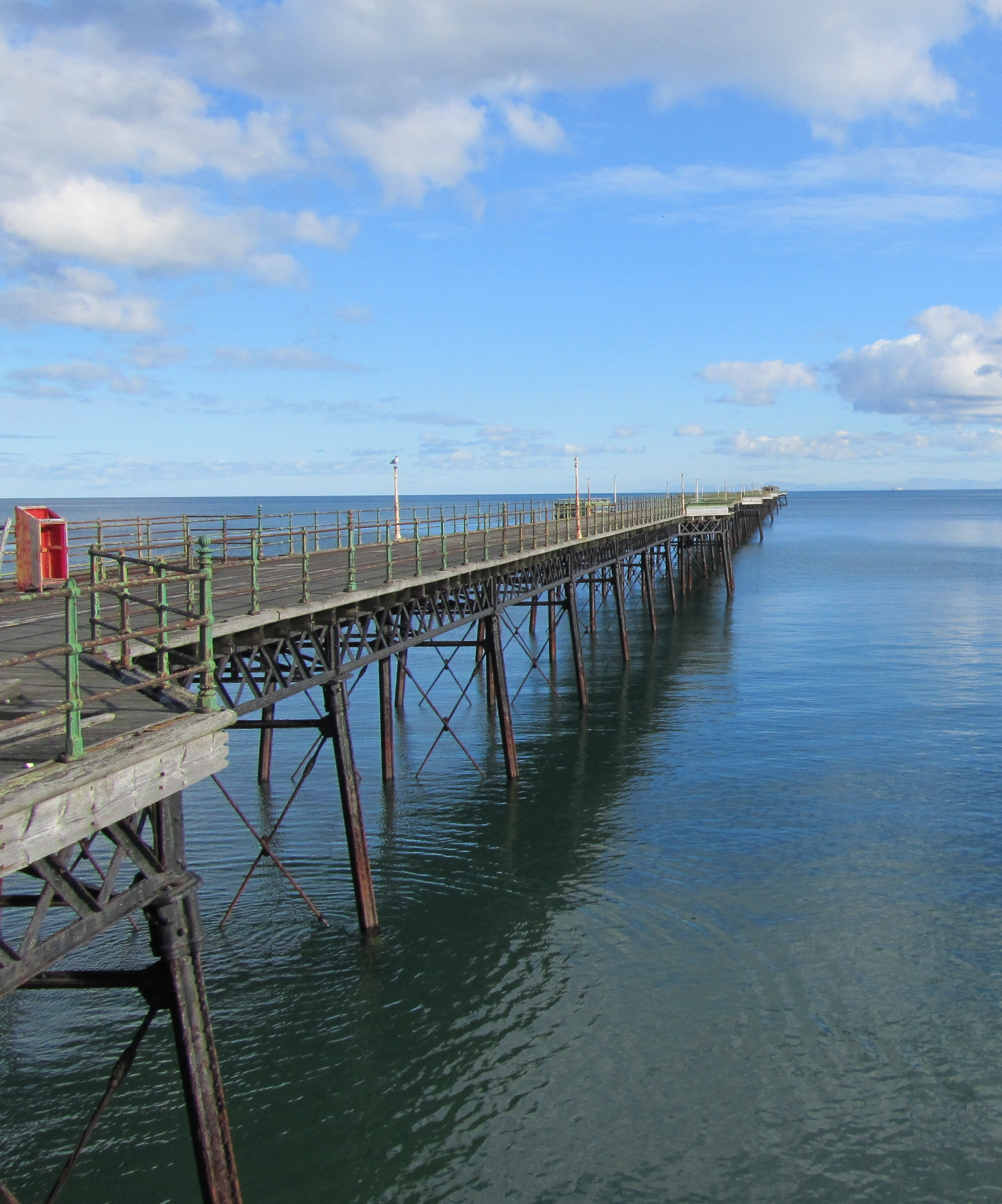
- Queen's Pier, 2010
- Type: Victorian steamer pier
- Carries: Pedestrians and tramway
- Spans: Irish Sea
- Location: Ramsey, Isle of Man
- Coordinates: 54.3194°N 4.3707°W
- Owner: Isle of Man Government
- Maintained by: Isle of Man Government; Queen's Pier Restoration Trust

Characteristics
- Construction: Iron (renovation in steel)
- Total length: 747 yd (683 m)

History
- Designer: Sir John Coode
- Constructor: Head Wrightson
- Construction start: 1882
- Completion date: 1886
- Opening date: 1885
- Inaugurated: 22 July 1886
- Renovated: 2016 onwards
- Listed: IoM Registered Building 154
- Closure date: June 1990

Queen's Pier, Ramsey is 2,241 feet (683 metres) long and was built for the Isle of Man Harbour Board for the sum of £40,752 (about £4.3 million in today's terms) by Head Wrightson of Stockton-on-Tees, England. The designer was Sir John Coode, who later became president of the Institution of Civil Engineers. Construction work began in 1882 and the pier was officially opened on 22 July 1886 by Rowley Hill, Bishop of Sodor and Man, though it had already been in use for about one year whilst being finished. The pier was originally intended as a landing stage to allow Steam Packet ships to pick up or discharge passengers when the tide was low. At low water spring tides one could expect about 16 ft (5 m) at the pier head, enough for ships of about 250 ft (75 m) in length to pick up their passengers.

== Tramway ==
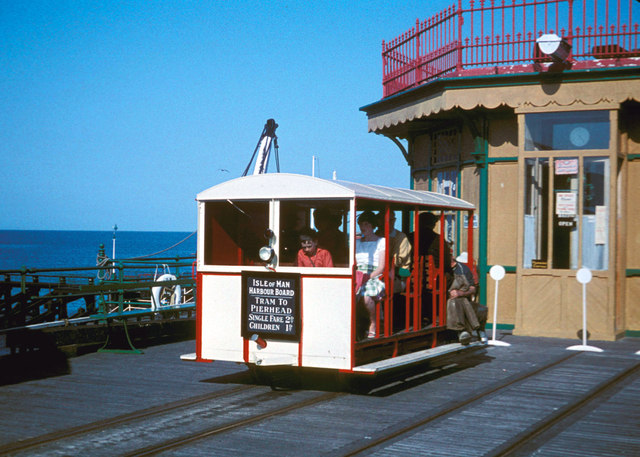
Passenger tram in 1961

The builders installed a 3 ft (914 mm) tramway on the pier to help transport building materials to the end of the pier. The tramway was intended to be dismantled once the pier was completed. However, Sir John Coode added some passing loops and some sidings, so that passenger baggage could be moved easily up and down the pier without passengers carrying it. The only problem was that the luggage wagons had to be pushed by hand. It was not until the 1900s that a passenger car was added, so that passengers did not have to walk the 2,160 ft (660 m), which was especially unpopular when it was windy and raining. As that also had to be pushed by hand, it was quicker to walk.

In the 1930s a locomotive powered by a Ford 20 horsepower (15 kilowatts) engine was added: it travelled at just under 10 mph (16 km/h). In the 1950s they added a Wickham railcar powered by a Ford 52 hp (39 kW) engine, which could reach speeds of 20 mph (32 km/h), but they were never allowed to open the throttle up as the brakes were inadequate. A turning loop in the promenade road was added, making the tramway 2,280 ft (690 m) long. Originally operated by two hand-propelled carts for carrying luggage, it was later operated by a Planet diesel locomotive and carriage, and later still by a railcar.

== Closure ==
In 1970, the last steamer called at the Pier Head. Upon closing in June 1990 due to concerns about its safety, the rolling stock was removed to a small museum, apart from the long-disused luggage cart that remained on site. The "Planet" locomotive is preserved at Jurby Transport Museum.

== Restoration ==
In 2015 the Ramsey Queen's Pier Restoration Trust (QPRT) started work with the Isle of Man Government to lease the pier. The harbour director had confirmed that a three-year lease was being drawn up to offer the pier at a peppercorn rent to the trust, which was beginning to raise funds to restore the first 50 m (160 ft) section. In March 2016, campaigners, who had been negotiating with the Manx government for a licence to access to the pier to carry out a survey of the structure, announced that they hoped to have the keys to the long-closed pier within two weeks. An initial three-year licence would enable a formally constituted trust to complete repairs to the first three bays, which would provide a better understanding of what the whole project would entail. On completion of this phase, it was intended that a 99-year lease would be granted to allow the remainder of the pier to be finished and brought back into public use. Local people were being urged to join the project group to help bring about the restoration. Ways of raising the cash needed for the restoration work were being explored, and a number of fund-raising events were being targeted. In May 2016, the gates of the 130-year-old Victorian pier were officially unlocked for the first time in 25 years when the government handed over the keys to the QPRT. It was estimated that full restoration could cost around £1.5 million. The pier would, however, remain closed to the general public. A QPRT spokesman said the next stage of their campaign would see a survey undertaken before a £60,000 project got under way to restore the first of 55 bays. In July 2017, the QPRT announced that work on the pier could begin after they signed a five-year lease from the Manx government. They planned to get the tramway up and running as soon as the pier refurbishment is completed.

The first three restored sections of the Queen's Pier were reopened in July 2021. It was the result of four years' work by 20 QPRT volunteers, who hope to go on and restore bays four to eight—of 60 in total—in Phase 2 of the restoration. As part of the celebration, the tramway's original Hibberd locomotive and bogie carriage were loaned back to the pier by the Jurby Transport Museum. In October 2021, the Trust received a £50,000 lottery grant from the Dormant Assets Fund, which would enable the restoration to begin.

In August 2024, the pier tramway carried passengers for the first time in 40 years. In the summer of 2025, the pier was open to the public (on Sunday afternoons) as far as the eighth bay, and the tramway was also running that far. Progress on bays 9 and 10 was delayed by poor weather, and work beyond bay 9 will be in a depth of sea that precludes the use of access platforms and telehandlers on the beach for safety reasons, thus slowing progress.
