= Jurby Transport Museum =

Coordinates: 54.3591°N 4.5245°W

- Thie Tashtee Arraghey Yurby
- Established: 2 April 2010
- Location: Hangar 230; Jurby Industrial Estate; Jurby, Isle of Man
- Type: Transport museum
- Collection size: bus
- Visitors: 32,900 (as of 27/02/13)
- Directors: Richard Davis (2010–2); Chris Machin (2012–)
- Parking: On site (free)
- Website: http://jtmiom.im/

The Jurby Transport Museum (Manx: Thie Tashtee Arraghey Yurby) is a transport museum in Jurby on the Isle of Man occupying a former aircraft hangar.

The museum is operated by a group of volunteers who are members of the Manx Transport Trust. Entrance is free but donations are welcome. The museum receives no public funding and relies on donations to aid its running costs

== History ==
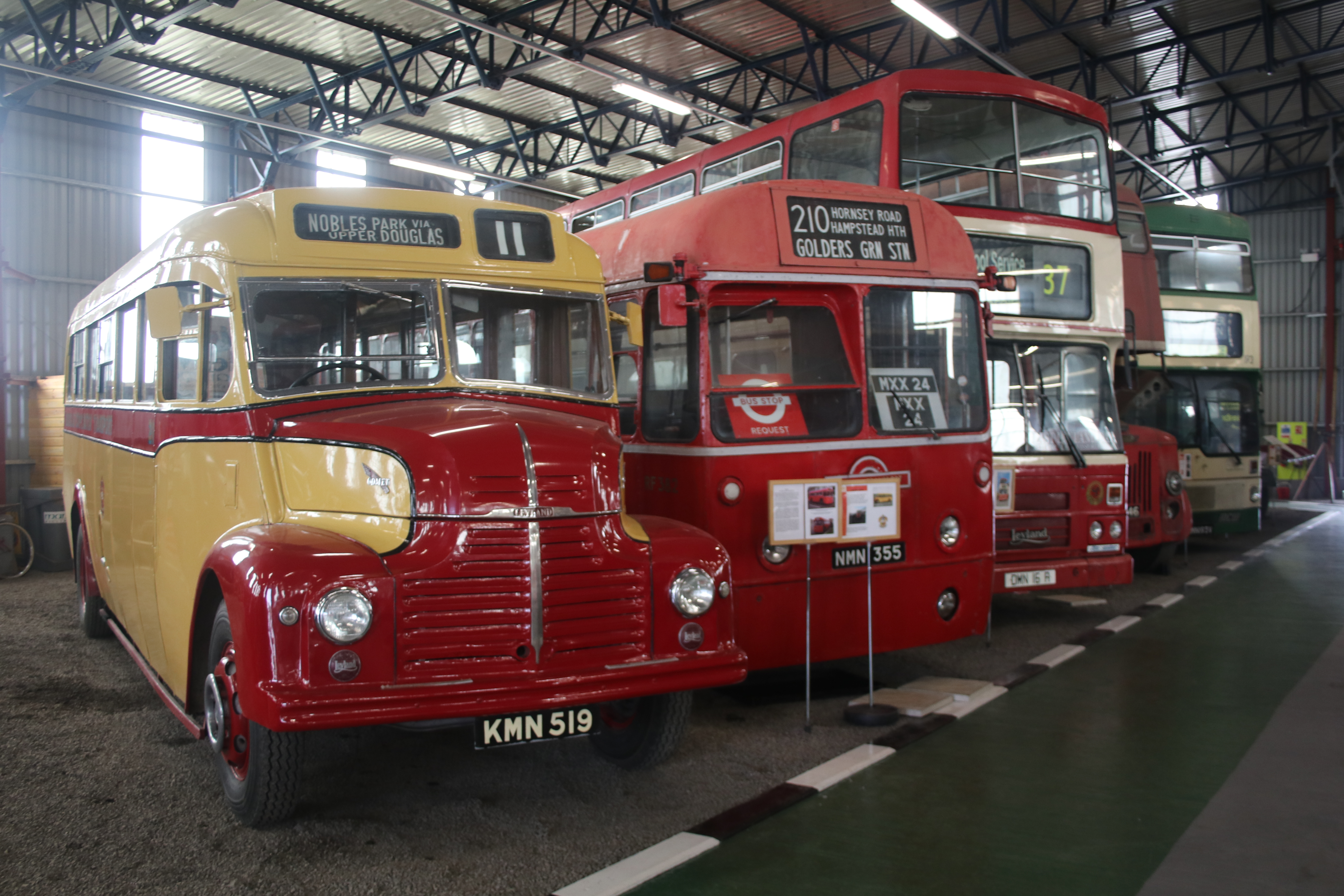
Buses inside the museum

The museum was prepared by a group of volunteers prior to its opening. The museum opened to the public in April 2010 by the then Chairman of Jurby Transport Museum Richard Davisand Chief Minister of the Isle of Man, Tony Brown.

Since the museum opened, there have been over 30,000 visitors.

== Collection ==
=== Buses ===
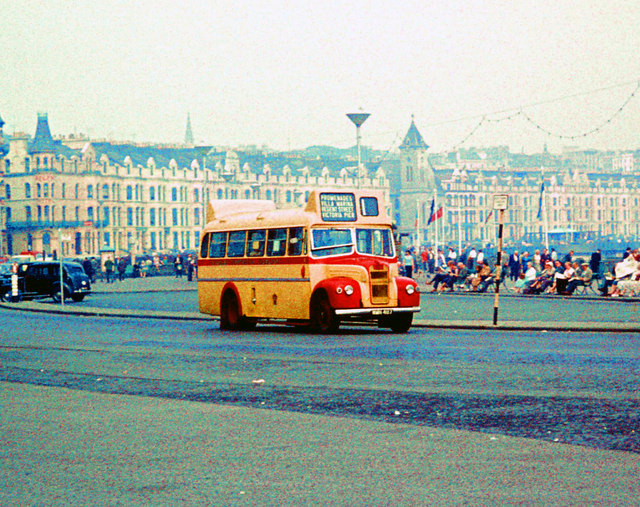
An example of a vehicle in the museum's collection – Guy Otter WMN-487

The museum has varied collection of buses dating from 1927 to 1997. Newer vehicles include two Leyland Olympians and a Dennis Dart. Other common vehicle types at the museum are Leyland Atlanteans – including an ex SELNEC Atlantean with Park Royal body – and an ex Merseyside PTE "Jumbo" Atlantean (1235), three Leyland Titans, two AEC Regent IIIs and a Regent V – the latter being the last double decker ever built by AEC.

The island's first preserved low floor bus – a Dennis Dart SLF with Marshall Capital bodywork – is currently undergoing restoration at the museum.

=== Railways ===
Also here is the 3 ft (914 mm) gauge Hibberd 4wDM locomotive that ran on the Queen's Pier Tramway at Ramsey, together with its bogie carriage. These were briefly returned to the pier for the re-opening of the first restored section of the pier and tramway on 19 July 2021.

== Facilities ==
The museum has a shop which located adjacent to the former Douglas Bay Horse Tramway tram number 22. Also available is hot and cold drinks, snacks and refreshments. Car parking is available on site.

== Opening times ==
The museum is open every weekend and Bank Holidays during the Summer and Sunday and Bank Holidays during the winter. Admission is free.
