= Chamelecón River =

River in Honduras

- Location of mouth

Location
- Country: Honduras

Physical characteristics
- Mouth
  - coordinates: 15°53′47″N 87°47′22″W

The Chamelecón River is a river in Honduras. It is a major risk river when there are heavy rain or hurricanes, posing a flooding threat for the Sula Valley.

== See also ==
- List of rivers of Honduras
