= Douglas Bay Horse Tramway =

Passenger tramway on the Isle of Man

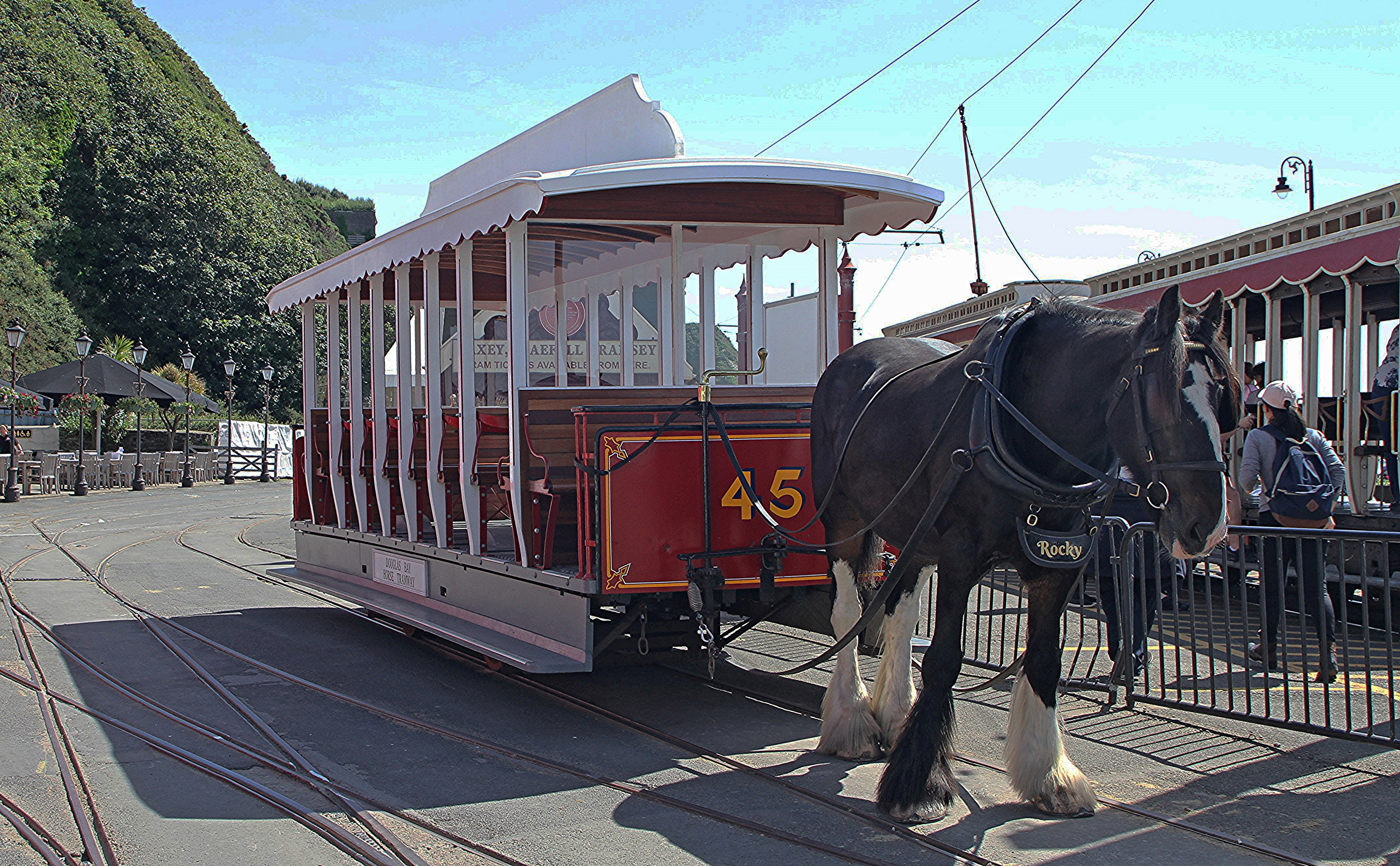
- No.46, Derby Castle
- Locale: Douglas, Isle of Man
- Terminus: Derby Castle station / Villa Marina

Commercial operations
- Built by: Thomas Lightfoot
- Original gauge: 3 ft (914 mm)

Preserved operations
- Owned by: Isle of Man Government
- Operated by: Isle of Man Railways
- Stations: Various (hail & ride)
- Length: 1.6 miles (2.6 km)
- 7 August 1876: Official opening
- 2 January 1900: Takeover, Douglas Corporation
- 30 September 1927: Winter service terminated
- 28 September 1939: Closed for duration
- 1 May 1946: Seasonal services resumed

Preservation history
- 9 August 1956: 80th Anniversary
- 7 August 1976: Centenary parade
- 7 August 2011: 135th Anniversary
- 7 August 2026: 150th Anniversary
- Headquarters: Banks Circus

Website
- www.rail.im
Route map

The Douglas Bay Horse Tramway on the Isle of Man runs along the seafront promenades of Douglas for approximately 1 mile (1.6 km), from the southern terminus at the Villa Marina, to Derby Castle station, the southern terminus of the Manx Electric Railway, where the workshops and sheds are located. It is a distinctive tourist attraction.

== History ==
The tramway was built and initially operated by Thomas Lightfoot, a retired civil engineer from Sheffield. His service was introduced in 1876 between the bottom of what is now Summer Hill and the bottom of Broadway in the centre of today's promenade adjacent to the Villa Marina. In the earliest days the track was expanded, and passing loops and long crossovers added so that by 1891 the line ran double track the entire length of the promenade, much as it does today. From opening it has operated every year, except for a period during the Second World War.

In 1882, Lightfoot sold the line to Isle of Man Tramways Ltd, later the Isle of Man Tramways & Electric Power Co. Ltd, which also owned the Manx Electric Railway. The company went into liquidation in 1900 as a consequence of a banking collapse. The tramway was sold by the liquidator to Douglas Corporation in 1902. Since 1927 the tramway has run in summer only.

In 2014 it was announced by the Department of Infrastructure that during 2015 the horse trams would be temporarily suspended while resurfacing work on the promenade continued into its next phase, which runs from Regent Street to Strathallan. However, the plans were later revised, allowing regular horse tram operation to take place in 2015, 2016 and 2017.

In 2015 Douglas Corporation partnered with Isle of Man Transport to introduce the 'Ticketer' system as used across the Island's other public transport systems. On board a Ticketer hand-held unit connects with the island-wide contactless Go Cards and individual tickets can also be purchased.

=== Closure ===
Despite being the world's last remaining 19th century original horse-drawn passenger tramway and the second-oldest operational rail system on the island, the future of the tramway has been brought into question in recent years. In January 2016, Douglas Corporation announced that the tramway had run for the last time the previous September and that they had closed it as it was not financially viable. The tramway had made a loss of £263,000 in 2015.

=== Continuance ===
After an online petition attracted more than 2,000 signatures, the House of Keys established a committee to look into ways of retaining the iconic horse trams. The operation of the tramway was taken over by the Isle of Man Heritage Railways division of the Department of Infrastructure and continued in the 2016, 2017 and 2018 summer seasons.

Various plans were submitted by the Department of Infrastructure to rebuild the Douglas Promenades. In one version, the tramway would move from its location in the middle of the roadway to a new single line formation adjacent to the Promenade walkway. The plans received some criticism from a group of local residents who objected to the siting of the trams near to the walkway. However, in 2019, the tracks were relaid in their previous alignment along the centre of the road. Trams started running again on Friday 29 July 2022, between Strathallan tram depot and Broadway.

== Description ==
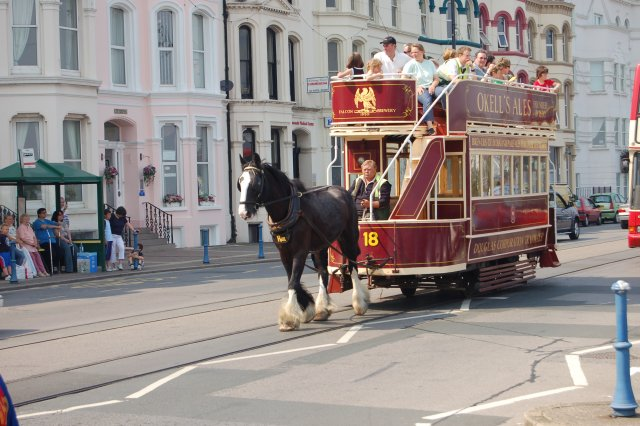
Double deck horse drawn tram on Douglas Seafront

The tramway is 3 ft (914 mm) narrow-gauge, double track throughout, running down the middle of the road. Service is provided by 23 tramcars and some 45 horses. There have been several types of tramcar, and at least one of each type has been retained. Most services are maintained by "closed toastracks", with winter saloons and open toastracks also in semi-regular service. In summer, trams are stabled outdoors overnight adjacent to the Terminus Tavern public house, and there is a purpose-built tramshed where they are stored in winter.

Point	Coordinates (Links to map resources)	OS Grid Ref	Notes
Derby Castle	54.1671°N 4.4612°W	SC39427738	
Regency Hotel	54.1660°N 4.4652°W	SC39157727	
The Hydro	54.1641°N 4.4685°W	SC38937707	
The Palace Hotel	54.1627°N 4.4710°W	SC38767692	
Castle Terrace	54.1612°N 4.4733°W	SC38617675	
The Esplanade	54.1584°N 4.4760°W	SC38427645	
Gaiety Theatre	54.1553°N 4.4780°W	SC38287611	(Currently closed)
Loch Promenade	54.1515°N 4.4779°W	SC38277569	(Currently closed)
Regent Street	54.1500°N 4.4771°W	SC38327552	(Currently closed)
Sea Terminal	54.1491°N 4.4754°W	SC38427541	(Currently closed)

(All stops except the termini are request stops.)

== Tramcar Fleet ==
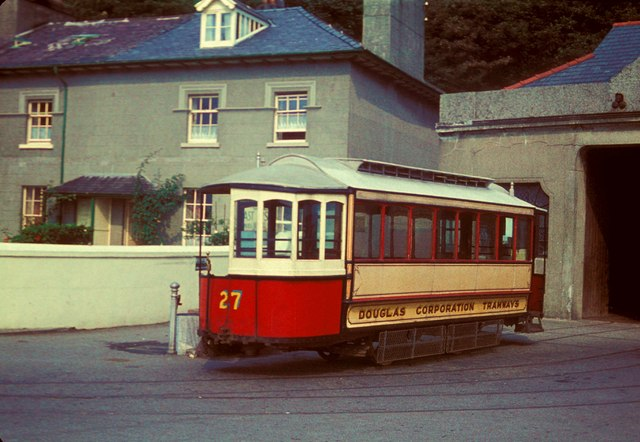
Saloon No.27 (1961)

The remaining core of service trams represent a cross-section of various types of car used on the line over the years; notable exceptions from the current fleet are an umbrella car (one of which survives as a souvenir shop elsewhere) and a convertible car, although one of these survives in private ownership. This was the last of three cars from 1935 which were dubbed "tomato boxes" owing to their unconventional appearance. On 27 August 2016, after Douglas City Council relinquished ownership, six trams were sold at auction (28, 33, 34, 37, 39 and 40). Trams notated as "rebuilt" are considered to be part of the "Heritage Fleet".

Key:	In Traffic	Extant	Scrapped

No.	Built	Builder	Layout	Seats	Livery	Notes
1*	1913	G.F. Milnes	Saloon	30	Red/Cream	Bushy's Brewery Adverts (2025), * Replacement Vehicle
1	1876	Starbuck	Double Deck	36	~	Converted Ex-Single Deck 1884, Later Replaced
2	1876	Starbuck	Double Deck	36	~	Not Used After World War II, Scrapped 1948
3	1876	Starbuck	Double Deck	36	~	Not Used After World War II, Scrapped 1948
4	1882	Metro-Cam	Double Deck	34	~	Not Used After World War II, Scrapped 1949
5	1883	Starbuck	Double Deck	34	~	Not Used After World War II, Scrapped 1949
6	1883	Starbuck	Double Deck	34	~	Not Used After World War II, Scrapped 1949
7	1884	Starbuck	Double Deck	42	~	Extended Dash Panels, Scrapped 1950
8	1884	Starbuck	Double Deck	42	~	Not Used After World War II, Stored & Scrapped 1948
9	1884	Starbuck	Toastrack	32	~	Scrapped 1952, Retained Oil Lamps To End
10	1884	Starbuck	Toastrack	40	~	Scrapped (Ancillary Parts Retained), Scrapped 1979
11	1886	Starbuck	Toastrack	32	Red/White	Withdrawn 1976 & Moved Jurby - Wirral May 2021
12	1888	Starbuck	Toastrack	32	Blue/Gold	Lamps Only (No Advertisements Carried)
13	1887	Metro-Cam	Double Deck	42	~	Destroyed In Depot Rockslide 1908, Replacement Car
14	1887	Metro-Caml	Double Deck	42	~	Destroyed In Depot Rockslide 1908, Replacement Car
15	1887	Metro-Cam	Double Deck	42	~	Second Hand Ex-South Shields, Scrapped 1939
16	1887	Metro-Cam	Double Deck	42	~	Purchased Second Hand 1915 Ex-South Shields
17	1886	Metro-Cam	Double Deck	48	~	Ex-South Shields To Single Deck 1903, Scrapped 1914
18	1883	Metro-Cam	Double Deck	42	Red/Cream	Bushy's Ads, To Single-Deck 1904, Revert Double 1989
19	1889	G.F. Milnes	Toastrack	32		Withdrawn & Stored After 1940, Scrapped 1949
20	1889	G.F. Milnes	Toastrack	32		Withdrawn & Stored, After 1940, Scrapped 1949
21	1890	G.F. Milnes	Toastrack	40	Red/White	Lamps Only, Rebuilt 2018-2019, In Regular Use
22	1890	G.F. Milnes	"Umbrella"	32	Red/White	Derby Castle Tram Shop (Last Surviving Sunshade)
23	1891	G.F. Milnes	"Umbrella"	33	~	Retractable Roof 1908, Later Fixed Roof, Scrapped 1952
24	1891	G.F. Milnes	"Umbrella"	32	~	Retractable Canvas Roof 1910 Later Fixed, Scrap 1952
25	1891	G.F. Milnes	Toastrack	32	~	Scrapped 1953, Retained Original Oil Lamps
26	1891	G.F. Milnes	Toastrack	32	~	With Ancillary Parts & Lamps Retained, Scrapped 1974
27	1892	G.F. Milnes	Saloon	30	Blue/Cream	No Adverts Carried, Rebuilt 2017-2018, In Regular Use
28	1892	G.F. Milnes	Saloon	30	Red/Cream	Privately Owned & Fully Restored, Off-Island
29	1892	G.F. Milnes	Saloon	30	Red/Cream	No Adverts Carried, Rebuilt 2017-2019, In Regular Use
30	1894	G.F. Milnes	Toastrack	32	~	Scrapped 1960
31	1894	G.F. Milnes	Toastrack	32	~	Used As All-Over Advertising Car From 1977, Scrapped 1987
32	1896	G.F. Milnes	Sunshade	32	Red/White	Withdrawn 2018, Rebuild 2019-2025
33	1896	G.F. Milnes	Bulkhead	32	Red	Bulkheads Added 1974, Sold August 2016 (£1,200)
34	1896	G.F. Milnes	Bulkhead	32	Maroon/White	Sold 2016, Motorised 2018 Jurby Museum
35	1896	Milnes-Voss	Sunshade	32	~	Glazed Bulkheads 1966, Scrapped 2022
36	1896	G.F. Milnes	Sunshade	40	Red/White	No Adverts Carried, Rebuilt 2016-2017, "Tram of the Year"
37	1896	G.F. Milnes	Bulkhead	32	Red/White	Bulkheads 1972, Sold Privately August 2016 (£1,100)
38	1902	G.F. Milnes	Toastrack	40	Red/White	Scheduled For Rebuild Not In Operation
39	1902	Starbuck	Toastrack	40	Red/White	Lengthened 1934, Sold M.E.R. Society 2016 (£1,800)
40	1902	G.F. Milnes	Toastrack	40	Red/White	Lengthened 1939, Sold Privately August 2016 (£1,000)
41	1905	G.F. Milnes	Toastrack	40	~	Lengthened 1944 Scrapped 1988 Parts Retained
42	1905	G.F. Milnes	Toastrack	40	Maroon	Carries Naff Modern Logos, Rebuilt 2017-2018
43	1907	U.E.C.C.	Bulkhead	40	Red/White	No Adverts Carried, Stripped 2025, Stored Off Site
45	1908	U.E.C.C.	Bulkhead	40	Red/White	Groudle Railway Adverts, Rebuilt 2018, "Knifeboards"
46	1909	G.F. Milnes	Toastrack	40	~	Sold Birkenhead Museum Scrapped 1990 ("Lido Tram")
47	1911	G.F. Milnes	Sunshade	40	Red Dash	Moved Jurby - Wirral May 2021 Cosmetically Restored
48	1935	Vulcan Motor	"Tomato Box"	27/34	~	Sold M.E.R. 1978 (Waiting Shelter), Scrapped 1979-1982
49	1935	Vulcan Motor	"Tomato Box"	27/34	Maroon Dash	Withdrawn 1978 (Last of Kind) Privately Owned
50	1935	Vulcan Motor	"Tomato Box"	27/34	~	Sold M.E.R. 1978 Waiting Shelter, Scrapped 1979-1982

== See also ==
- Transport in the Isle of Man
- Victor Harbor Horse Drawn Tram, a horse-drawn tramway in Australia
- List of tram and light rail transit systems
- List of town tramway systems in Europe
