= John Kewley (mine engineer) =

Manx mining engineer

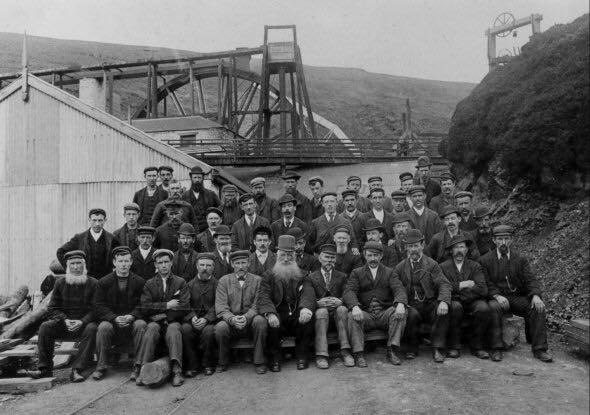
- Snaefell miners circa 1897. Captain John Kewley is pictured front center

Personal details
- Born: 1832 Isle of Man
- Died: 2 February 1905 (aged 72–73) Snaefell Mine, Isle of Man
- Profession: Mine Engineer

John Kewley (1832 – 2 February 1905) was Captain of the Great Snaefell Mine, Isle of Man. He is remembered for his heroism following the Snaefell Mine Disaster of 1897, during which he displayed extraordinary courage and endurance and for which he received the Medal of the Honourable Order of the Knights of St John of Jerusalem.

== Biography ==
John Kewley was born on the Isle of Man in 1832 and following his education, he became a mine engineer. He took employment with the Great Snaefell Mining Company progressing to become manager of the mine, referred to as the Mine Captain.

== Snaefell Mine Disaster ==
By 1897 the Snaefell mine had become increasingly difficult to work as a consequence of insufficient ventilation (the lowest depth of the mine shaft by this time being at 171 fathoms (1,026 ft (312.7 m)). This ongoing problem had become increasingly acute as the various levels were driven further from the main shaft.

During early May 1897, dynamite had been used to enable the extension of the workings in the lowest part in order for the working levels to be extended and an inspection of the mine had been undertaken by the Government Inspector, along with the Mine Captain on Friday 7 May, the purpose of which was to ensure there was sufficient ventilation, with their findings being satisfactory.

Miners had finished their shift on Saturday 8 May, and the mine was closed the following day, Sunday 9 May. Due to inadequate safety measures a stray candle had been allowed to continue burning which in turn set fire to a nearby pit prop consequently starting a fire in the shaft. The fire would have continued burning so long as oxygen was present, the process forming carbon monoxide which filled the lower parts of the shaft.

On Monday 10 May at 06:00hrs, 40 miners reported for the early shift, 34 of whom were required for the shift, and began descending into the mine using the ladders which were lashed against the side of the shaft. As the miners descended into the lower parts of the shaft they encountered the poisonous fumes which resulted in immediate breathing difficulties. At once the miners began to vacate the shaft, those at the top were able to make their way out without too much difficulty, however others arrived at the surface in a state of near collapse and it soon became apparent that a large number of the miners who'd made the descent were unable to return.

Despite being 65 years of age at the time, Capt. Kewley immediately organised and personally led the rescue mission, and with complete disregard for his own safety descended the mine shaft in order to render aid to any who might be living and to recover the bodies of the dead miners.

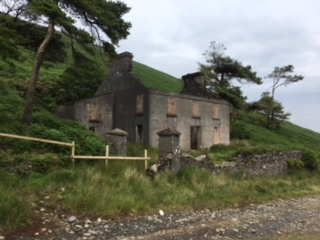
The Mine Captain's House, the residence of John Kewley at the Great Snaefell Mine

On Saturday 15 May, Capt. Kewley and some other miners re-entered the mine in order to retrieve the body of Robert Kelly, which was situated at the 130 fathom level, and where the presence of gas had made recovery impossible. As they descended the party became overpowered by gas, which resulted in Capt. Kewley having to be placed in the kibble in order for him to be hauled to the surface. The kibble jammed in the shaft, and it took in excess of an hour before Capt. Kewley, in a state of semi-consciousness, could be brought to the surface.

=== Medal of the Order of St John of Jerusalem ===
At a meeting of the general committee of the Snaefell Mine Disaster Fund, presided over by the Lieutenant Governor of the Isle of Man, John Henniker-Major, 5th Baron Henniker was held on Monday 13 September 1897, at which it was announced that the Lieutenant Governor had been successful in obtaining for Captain John Kewley and Mr G. Williams under the Metalliferous Mines Regulation Act for the Inspection of Mines in the Isle of Man, the Medal of the Honourable Order of the Knight of St John of Jerusalem. The medal was rewarded for the self-sacrificing exertion and distinguished bravery displayed under the most trying and hazardous circumstances in their heroic efforts to save life and succour the helpless in connection with the disaster. Governor Henniker was a Knight of Justice of the Honourable Order and as such he had been requested to make the presentation on behalf of the Prince of Wales. The presentation took place at the Working Men's Institute, Laxey, on Saturday 25 September.

== Death ==
It is said that Capt. Kewley never fully recovered from his exertions during the rescue and recovery of the miners in connection to the disaster. John Kewley died at the Snaefell Mine on 2 February 1905. He was 73 years of age.

=== Funeral ===
Captain Kewley's funeral took place on Monday 6 February 1905. It is said that it was attended by all the principal people in the Parish of Lonan and miners from the Great Snaefell Mine followed in procession behind the coffin. Captain Kewley's body was interred in Lonan Parish Cemetery.

== See also ==
- Great Snaefell Mine
- Ballajora Mine
- Maughold Head Mine
- William Kitto
- Dhyrnane Mine
- Snaefell Wheel
- Laxey Wheel
- Great Laxey Mine
- Great Laxey Mine Railway
