= Foxdale Mines =

Historic network of mines and shafts on the Isle of Man

Foxdale Mine
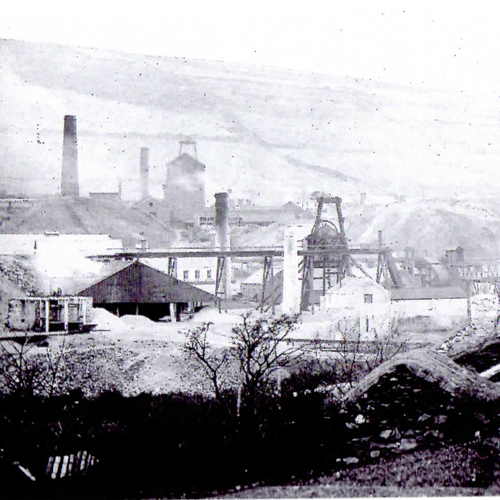
- Foxdale Mines

- Location in Isle of Man
- Location: Foxdale, Isle of Man, , Isle of Man; 54°10′09″N 4°38′22″W
- Products: Silver ore, Lead ore, Zinc
- Opened: 1828
- Closed: 1911
- Company: Isle of Man Mining Company

The Foxdale Mines is a collective term for a series of mines and shafts which were situated in a highly mineralised zone on the Isle of Man, running east to west, from Elerslie mine in Crosby to Niarbyl on the coast near Dalby. In the 19th century the mines were widely regarded as amongst the richest ore mines in the British Isles.

== History ==
=== Origins ===
The origin of mining in the Isle of Man is not recorded, however there is evidence of workings at Bradda Head dating from ancient times. Ore had been extracted by a method referred to as plug and feather or "feather wedges," which indicates that the workings date from before the introduction of gun powder into Europe.

A plug and feather wedge, as would have been used in the early extractions of lead on the Isle of Man.

The first recorded mining operation was in 1246, when Norse Kings ruled the Isle of Man, and King Harald II granted a charter to the monks of Furness Abbey.

By the mid-19th century, the Isle of Man was one of the leading lead producing districts in Britain and more zinc was produced from the Island's mines than all the other mines in Britain combined.

=== Operation ===
Workings in the area of Foxdale date from 1724 when Lord Derby granted permission for the extraction of ore to begin. Initial results were somewhat mixed but work continued spasmodically until in 1848 when it is reported that 400 miners were in the employ of the mines and had uncovered a great mass of ore which could be easily extracted. Output continued to increase; 3,753 tons of lead ore yielding 2,725 tons of lead was mined on the Island in 1856 of which Foxdale Mines contributed 2,535 tons generating a profit of £11,200. For the same period profit from the Great Laxey Mine amounted to £1,000. In 1875 11,898 tons of zinc blende was extracted, in 1877 186,019 ounces of silver. In 1891 the produce of the Foxdale Mines amounted to £45,200.

By 1892 several Lodes were being worked. These extended for approximately 2–3 miles, one yielding a substantial deposit of silver and another a sizable amount of very rich lead ore.

Near these mines, known as the New Foxdale Mines, several shafts were sunk by prospectors, but while some lead was found it soon petered out, and they were abandoned.

There was also a group of mines in the valley known as the Old Foxdale Mines. These contained the Flappy Vein and were worked until 1888. Also situated nearby was the Louisa Mine, however this was only worked for a short period of time before it was found to be uneconomical. A shaft was also sunk at East Foxdale which returned a substantial yield up until 1889 by which time it was worked out.

The mines continued to achieve a profit throughout the remainder of the 19th century, although the amount declined in part due to a stagnation in the price of ore. In 1900 the ore risings for the year amounted to 3,610 tons yielding a profit of £10,800 an increase of £2,000 on the 1899 operation and producing a dividend of 7.5%.

=== Closure ===
During the first decade of the 20th century the yield from the mines began to decline significantly and by 1910 the sale of ore was failing to cover the expenses of coal, labour and other sundries. The situation had become so dire that the directors of the Isle of Man Mining Company decided on stopping the operation unless the men agreed to a reduction in wages.

Despite the men accepting reduced terms and conditions, yield continued to dramatically reduce, and in April 1911 a decision was taken by the directors to wind up the Isle of Man Mining Company. An extraordinary general meeting was held by the directors at the Law Association Rooms, Cook St, Liverpool on the evening of Thursday 6 April 1911 at which a liquidator was appointed for the purpose of voluntary winding up the Company.

The Isle of Man Mining Company ceased operations at Foxdale on Friday 28 July 1911.

The mines were not closed because they were worked out, but rather because by the early 20th century it had become cheaper to import ore from Spain and Australia than to mine it at considerable depths. The Beckwith Shaft which was sunk in 1849 had by the time of closure yielded 50,000 tons of lead ore with a value of £750,000 and had been worked to a depth of 230 fathoms equating to 1,380 ft (420.6 m). Extraction from such depths, with the infrastructure required, was not economically viable.

=== Re-opening ===
An illustration of how the spoil reside from Foxdale would have been crushed in a Ball mill.

Although none of the mine workings were re-opened, in 1955 it was thought that re-processing the spoil from the mines could extract a further yield of ore. A company, Metalliferous Holdings Ltd, had been formed and was already in the process of undertaking such work at the old Snaefell Mine. The new company employed 22 men in the undertaking working around the clock. Spoil residue was transported from Foxdale to the company's flotation plant where it was tipped into an automatic sieve and in turn fed into an 80-ton Ball mill which the company had sourced from the Gold Coast. The process saw the spoil crushed by steel balls and chemicals and then passed on to the flotation tanks where it was conditioned by more chemicals, automatically skimmed, and finally dried off into powder.

The venture was an initial success with the result that a Canadian mining company, Amanda Mines Ltd, proposed a merger with Metalliferous Holdings Ltd. An audit had found that approximately 400,000 tons of lead-zinc spoil was situated at the former pit heads at Laxey and Foxdale. At the end of May 1956 Amanda Mines took over Metalliferous Holdings Ltd with Metalliferous Holdings becoming a subsidiary of Amanda Mines. The operation yielded £60,000 in 1956. Production ceased in July 1958 as a consequence of a fall in the price of lead.

=== Beckwith Mine ===
The Beckwith mine derived its name from William Beckwith. The area where the mine was situated was immensely rich in deposits – 600 tons of ore being recovered before a shaft was sunk.

In time over 50,000 tons were extracted which realised approximately £750,000 for the mining company and resulted in great prosperity to the Isle of Man. It was as a result of this discovery that the Manx Northern Railway was founded, and operated mineral trains from Foxdale to Ramsey, where the trains ran along the quayside in order to unload their contents into ships. On the return journey the trains would haul coal to power the pumping houses of the mine shafts.

== See also ==
- Ballajora Mine
- Dhyrnane Mine
- Great Laxey Mine
- Great Laxey Mine Railway
- Great Snaefell Mine
- Laxey Wheel
- Maughold Head Mine
- Snaefell Wheel
- William Kitto

== Sources ==
Bibliography

- Manx Mines, Rocks, and Minerals. Published by the Manx Heritage Foundation in co-operation with Manx National Heritage. 1994
- Bawden T.A., Garrad L.S., Qualtrough J.W., and Scatchard W.R. The Industrial Archaeology of the Isle of Man. Published by David & Charles, 1972. (out of print)
- Industrial Archaeology of the Isle of Man – an Introduction. Produced by Manx National Heritage, 1993. Published by the Manx Experience.
