= Maughold Head Mine =

- Location in Isle of Man
- Location: Maughold, Isle of Man, , Isle of Man; 54.29861°N 4.31761°W
- Products: Hematite, Iron ore, Copper
- Opened: 1866
- Closed: 1874

The Maughold Head Mine was a copper mine located in the parish of Maughold, Isle of Man.

== History ==
Mining was a thriving industry on the Isle of Man up until the early part of the 20th century. The sett of the Maughold Mine comprised 95 acres and consisted of three lodes with strong branches or feeders between them. Of these lodes the No.1 or Eastern lode was between 12 ft (3.7 m) and 15 ft (4.6 m) whilst the No.2 or Western lode was 6 ft (1.8 m). The lodes ran in the same direction as the Great Laxey lodes and adjoined that of the Dhyrnane Mine.

The mines however produced a poor yield which resulted in the Maughold Head Mining Company, the mine's operator going into liquidation in 1874.

== See also ==
- Snaefell Wheel
- Laxey Wheel
- Great Laxey Mine
- Great Laxey Mine Railway
- Great Snaefell Mine
- Foxdale Mines

== Sources ==
Bibliography

- The Forgotten Iron Mines of Kirk Maughold, Isle of Man - D.B. Hollis, 1988. Published by The Northern Mine Research Society (1988).
