= Dhyrnane Mine =

Mine in Isle of Man, United Kingdom

- Location in Isle of Man

Location
- Location: Maughold, Isle of Man, Isle of Man; 54.29861°N 4.31761°W

Production
- Products: Hematite, Iron ore

History
- Opened: 1700
- Closed: 1893

Owner
- Company: Maughold Head Mining Company
- Acquired: 1873

The Dhyrnane Mine was a hematite and iron ore mine located in the parish of Maughold, Isle of Man.

== History ==
Mining on the Isle of Man can trace its origins as far back as the 13th century. Records of mining on the southern side of Maughold Head, in the vicinity of Port Moar, suggest that by 1700 a mine at Dhyrnane, mis-spelt as "Daunane," was producing a significant amount of hematite.

Workings during the period from the early 1700s until the 1840s were probably sporadic, however by the mid 1850s a more industrialised operation had been established. By the mid 1860s the mining sett comprised 350 acres, consisting of a level going in from the cliff face in a northwest direction which was connected to a shaft from the surface at 420 ft (128.0 m). A rich yield of hematite had by then been extracted from the entrance to the shaft. In 1873 the mine was acquired by the newly formed Maughold Head Mining Company however output began to decline significantly and the Maughold Head Mining Company went into liquidation in 1874.

The liquidation of the Maughold Head Mining Company was a protracted affair. As a result, working of the mine carried on at intermittent periods until the last workings were recorded in 1893.

== See also ==
- Ballajora Mine
- Maughold Head Mine
- Snaefell Wheel
- Laxey Wheel
- Great Laxey Mine
- Great Laxey Mine Railway
- Great Snaefell Mine

== Sources ==
Bibliography

- The Forgotten Iron Mines of Kirk Maughold, Isle of Man - D.B. Hollis, 1988. Published by The Northern Mine Research Society (1988).
- The Geology of the Isle of Man - G. W. LAMPLUGH, F.G.S. Published by Wyman & Sons Ltd, London (1903).
