= Ballajora Mine =

Mine on the Isle of Man

- Location in Isle of Man
- Location: Maughold, Isle of Man, Isle of Man; 54.29861°N 4.31761°W
- Products: Hematite, Iron ore, Copper
- Opened: 1858; 168 years ago
- Closed: 1874; 152 years ago

The Ballajora Mine also referred to as the Maughold Head Mine, was an iron ore, hematite and copper mine located in the parish of Maughold, Isle of Man. The mine lay principally on the farmland of Magher-beck. The head engineer of the mine, referred to as the Mine Captain, was John Faragher.

== History ==
Mining was an important occupation throughout the Isle of Man in the nineteenth century and the parish of Maughold was no exception. The mine at Drynane is mentioned in papers as far back as 1700 and at various periods shafts had been sunk at the Stack Moar on Maughold Head, at the Church Glebe and finally at Ballajora, situated at the cliff at Gob-ny-Garvain, Port-e-Vullen in the Cornah Glen. The mine was worked extensively from its opening in 1858 until its closure in 1874, yielding a considerable output of hematite.

== See also ==
- Foxdale Mines
- Great Laxey Mine
- Great Laxey Mine Railway
- Great Snaefell Mine
- Laxey Wheel
- Snaefell Wheel

== Sources ==
Bibliography

- Bawden T.A., Garrad L.S., Qualtrough J.W., and Scatchard W.R. The Industrial Archaeology of the Isle of Man. Published by David & Charles, 1972. (out of print)
- Industrial Archaeology of the Isle of Man - an Introduction. Produced by Manx National Heritage, 1993. Published by the Manx Experience.
- Manx Mines, Rocks, and Minerals. Published by the Manx Heritage Foundation in co-operation with Manx National Heritage. 1994
