= Farm tin =

Farm tin or the tin dues was one of a number of payments required of tin miners in Devon and Cornwall. The holder of a mining sett was required to pay a portion of the black tin extracted to the holder of the tin bounds in which the sett was granted. The portion was the "farm tin". The portion was normally interpreted to be one-twelfth of extracted tin: they were also required to play toll tin, calculated at one fifteenth.

== Bibliography ==
- Bainbridge, William (1867). A treatise on the law of mines and minerals. Butterworths.
- Gunning, Frederic (1833). A practical treatise on the law of tolls: and therein, of tolls thorough and traverse. Saunders and Benning.
