= Maughold Head Mining Company =

The Maughold Head Mining Company Limited
- Company type: Private
- Industry: Mining
- Founded: 1873; 153 years ago
- Headquarters: Isle of Man, British Isles
- Key people: Thomas Hazledine, Charles Cleator, Robert Cook, William Attfield, James Allen
- Products: Zinc, Iron Ore, Hematite

The Maughold Head Mining Company was a mining company formed to explorate around the area of Maughold Head on the Isle of Man. The company's registered offices were at 30, John St, Bedford Row, London.

== History ==
The company was formed with the intention of working two important mining setts in the Parish of Maughold comprising a total area of 445 acres, and which essentially comprised the Maughold Head Mine and the Dhyrnane Mine. The company comprised a called up capital of £25,000 in the form of £2 shares. The directors of the company included Thomas Hazledine, who also had an interest in mining ventures in Cornwall – notably the Phoenix United Mine and Charles Cleator who was Chairman of the Douglas Town Commissioners and a director of the Great Laxey Mine. The company secretary was William Mapleson.

However the yield realised from the mine workings never compared to that of the company's prospectus and in February 1874, less than a year after its inception, the Maughold Head Mining Company went into liquidation. Despite its operations being confined to the Isle of Man the Maughold Head Mining Company was never registered on the Isle of Man under the Companies' Act. The company remained in liquidation for a considerable time, the winding up being unable to be undertaken on the Isle of Man as the company was registered in the United Kingdom, a completely separate jurisdiction.

A protracted litigation of the creditors against the company continued finally being settled in 1881 following which the company was wound up.
