= Cornish Hush Mine =

Lead mine in County Durham, England

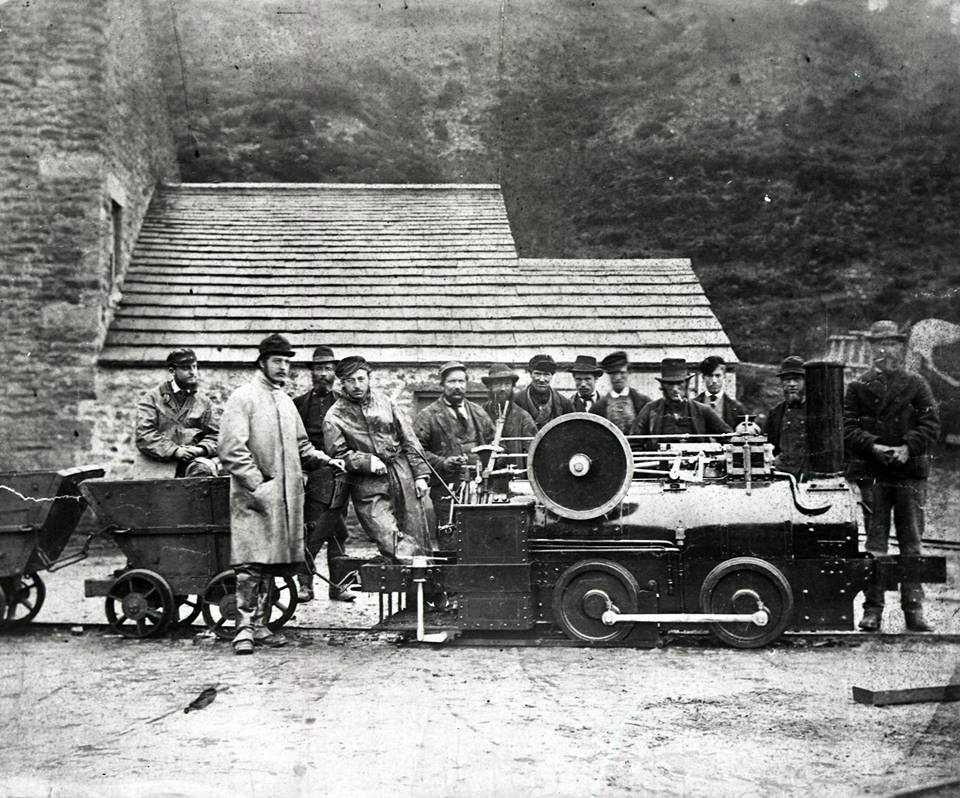
- Lewin's locomotive of 1874 used at the Cornish Hush Mine, Howden Burn

- Location within County Durham

Location
- Location: Howden Burn in the Bollihope Area of Weardale in the North Pennines, County Durham, England.; 54.69912°N 1.99690°W

Production
- Products: Lead ore, Calcite, Chalcopyrite, Fluorite, Galena, Pyrite and Quartz

History
- Active: at least 1863–1902, 1971–1972 and 1979–1980

Owner
- Company: London Lead Company, and since 1971 SAMUK

The Cornish Hush Mine was a British lead ore and fluorspar mine in Weardale.

== Location ==
The mine was located in the Howden Burn valley in the Bollihope Area of Weardale in the North Pennines, County Durham, England.

== History ==
The mine operated from at least 1863 to 1902 to mine lead ore and from 1971 to 1972 and from 1979 to 1980 to mine fluorspar .

=== Lead mining ===
One of the first publications about the Cornish Hush Mine described a fatal accident, in which miner John Collinson was buried underneath a large amount of rocks and lead ore falling onto him during his work and him killed immediately on 14 January 1863. A colleague named Bainbridge had worked with him about two minutes earlier and then moved about 6 foot (1.5 m) away to smoke his pipe as the stones fell onto Collinson. The stones were removed from him in a short time, but he was already dead by then.

The London Lead Company leased the so-called Cornish Mine in 1867 by the dean and chapter of Durham Cathedral. It was managed by R. W. Bainbridge, whose son, Henry Bainbridge, also worked there. All the work to clean and concentrate the ore was done by machines in a water based process, which were operated by adolescents under the supervision of an adult.

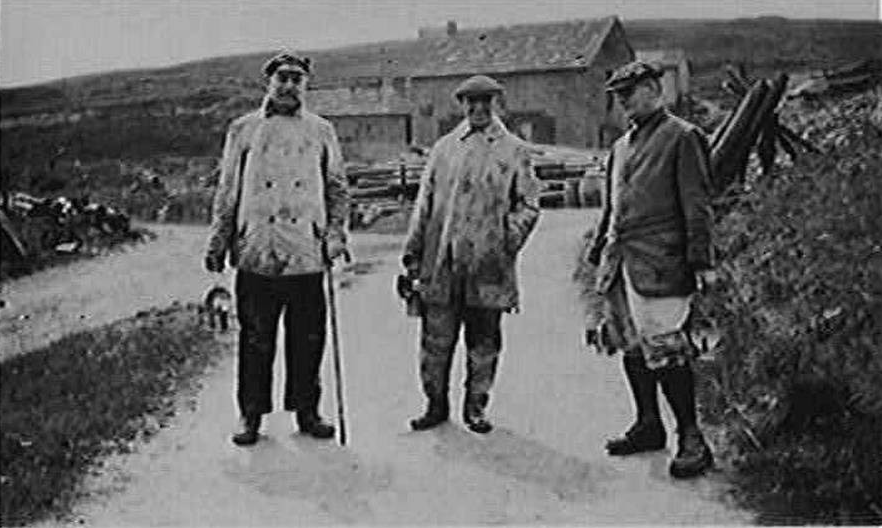
The last manager of the Cornish Hush Mine, Mr. Willis, in the centre, with Prof. Henry Louis on the left and Capt. Anthony Wilson on the right at Rookhope

On 27 July 1867, the Salmon Fishery Inspectors reported that they had visited several lead mines, where they inspected the hush, i.e. the waste water of the processing plant. There were three large tanks, each with several division into separate compartments, to clear the hush of impurities. Large sediment basins had been installed around 1863 side by side next to these tanks, through which the water flowed, set-up on the proposal of the Fisheries Commission in Darlington.

The mine employed 1898, at its height, 14 men, twelve of whom worked underground and two on the surface. The last agent of the Cornish Hush Mine was Joseph Anderson, and its last manager was Mr. Willis, before the London Lead Company went bankrupt in 1902.

=== Fluorspar mining ===
Various crystals were mined as a valuable by-product of lead mining, including the decorative colored fluorspar (fluorite), for which no industrial use was known until the late 19th century. Fluorite is not a gem, but fine specimens are appreciated by collectors. The Weardale fluorspar fluoresces due to europium impurities under excitation with bluish-ultraviolet light. The characteristic fluorescence of fluorite samples from this area resulted in the term describing this phenomenon. Weardale fluorspar is considered by collectors to be one of the best and therefore most valuable in the world. In the 20th century, fluorite was increasingly used industrially for steel smelting as well as for the production of Teflon non-stick frying pans, CFCs for aerosols and other products.

The Swiss Aluminum Mining UK Ltd (SAMUK) recommissioned the Cornish Hush Mine 1971–1972 and 1979–1980 with the aim to mine fluorspar in the Cornish Hush Vein and the Sharnberry Vein, but the latter was never reached.

== Narrow gauge railway ==
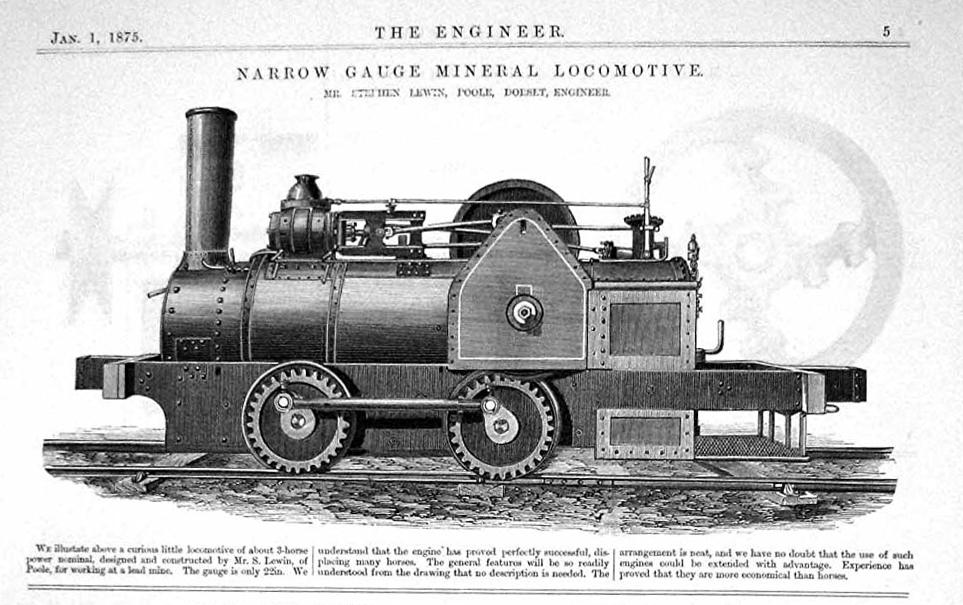
Stephen Lewin's narrow gauge mining locomotive, 1875

The mine was connected by a 1 mile (1.6 km) long 1 ft 10 in (559 mm) gauge light railway to Whitfield Brow. The mine's steam locomotive Samson was built by Stephen Lewin of Poole in Dorset in 1874 as an 0-4-0G steam locomotive. It had power of 2½ or 3 nhp and a loaded weight of 2.6 t. Its footplate provided just enough space for the engineer, who could sit on the rear buffer beam, as known from its even smaller sister locomotives 'Ant' and 'Bee' of the Great Laxey Mine. The locomotive was probably scrapped around 1904.

The locomotive of the mine was built by Stephen Lewin of Poole in Dorset in 1874 as a two-axle steam locomotive named 'Samson' with a left-side gear drive. The gears on the left wheels of the locomotive came neither in touch with the rail nor with a rack. The rear axle was driven crankshaft above of the boiler, which had a pinion on the left hand side underneath a protective cover with and a flywheel on the right hand side. The front axle, which was coupled to the rear axle by a connecting rod, did not actually need a gear, but had one, so that the front and rear axles could be exchanged or replaced with the same spare part when the gear was worn.

The locomotive had a gauge of only 22 inches (559 mm), a power of 2½ or 3 nhp and a service weight of 2.6 t. It was similar to its even smaller sister locomotives 'Ant' and 'Bee' from the Great Laxey Mine Railway, as the foot plate provided only space for the engine driver, who commonly sat on the rear buffer beam. 'Samson' was probably scrapped around 1904.

The Beamish Museum built a replica of the full-size locomotive, which has, however, slightly larger wheels and a 2-foot (610 mm) gauge. It was successfully steamed-up on 12 January 2016 and subsequently put into regular use.
