= Great Snaefell Mining Company =

The Great Laxey Mining Company Limited
- Type: Private
- Industry: Mining
- Founded: 1871; 155 years ago
- Headquarters: Isle of Man, British Isles
- Key people: James Spittal, Henry Noble, William Berry, Alfred Adams, Thomas Wilson
- Products: Zinc, Iron Ore, Silver

The Great Snaefell Mining Company was a mining company formed to operate the Great Snaefell Mine on the Isle of Man.

== History ==
The company was formed with the intention of working the important mining sett in the Parish of Lonan comprising an area of 567 acres, and which was originally a portion of the Great Laxey Mining Company's property.

The mining sett was surrounded by that of the Great Laxey Mining Company, running parallel with the Great Laxey lodes. The mine was originally worked by the Great Laxey Mining Company from 1856 to 1864 following which the Snaefell Mine Company was formed and which went into liquidation in 1870, with the assets of the company offered for sale.

The assets were bought for the sum of £4,000 on 27 April 1870 by James Spittal, Henry Bloom Noble, Thomas Wilson and Alfred Adams who formed the Great Snaefell Mining Company in March 1871. The company was a limited liability company, incorporated under the Companies Act 1862 and the Companies Act 1867 in England, and in the Isle of Man under the Limited Liability Act 1865.

The company comprised capital of £25,000 in the form of 25,000 £1 shares with approximately 50 per cent of the shareholding taken up by shareholders of the former operator. The directors of the company comprised; James Spittal, Henry Noble, William Berey, Thomas Wilson and Alfred Adams and the company had offices at 28, Athol Street, Douglas, Isle of Man and 26, Nicholas Lane, Lombard Street, London.

Throughout the 1870s and into the early 1880s the mine continued to produce a very limited yield, and the Great Snaefell Mining Company was wound up on 31 January 1884.

=== Snaefell Mining Company ===
This led to the re-formation of the Snaefell Mining Company, however the directors were essentially those who had been on the board of the previous company. This was brought about by the directors having obtained the opinion of Deemster Sherwood and the Attorney General of the Isle of Man, James Gell. It was therefore decided, after considerable consultation, to take advantage of a clause in the company's articles which empowered the directors to sell their shares in the Great Snaefell Mining Company, to then have them re-sold to a third party, and then transferred to the original shareholders. A meeting of the shareholders was subsequently held and the plan arranged was submitted to and adopted by the meeting. The difficulties of this arrangement were eventually overcome, and additional shares to the extent of 6,000 were issued.

By mid-1884 the lease of the mine had almost expired and was subsequently renegotiated giving the company a 21-year lease with a royalty of £30 per annum.

In 1897 the Snaefell Mine was the scene of a disaster when 19 miners died in the mine due to carbon monoxide poisoning as a consequence of a fire breaking out at the 130 fathom level.

Yield continued to be below expectations, and following a major rock fall in the shaft in 1908 it was deemed that the cost of making good the damage was greater than the value of the company. The mine was therefore closed and the company was wound up.
