= Stephen Lewin =

Stephen Lewin (architect and iron-founder)
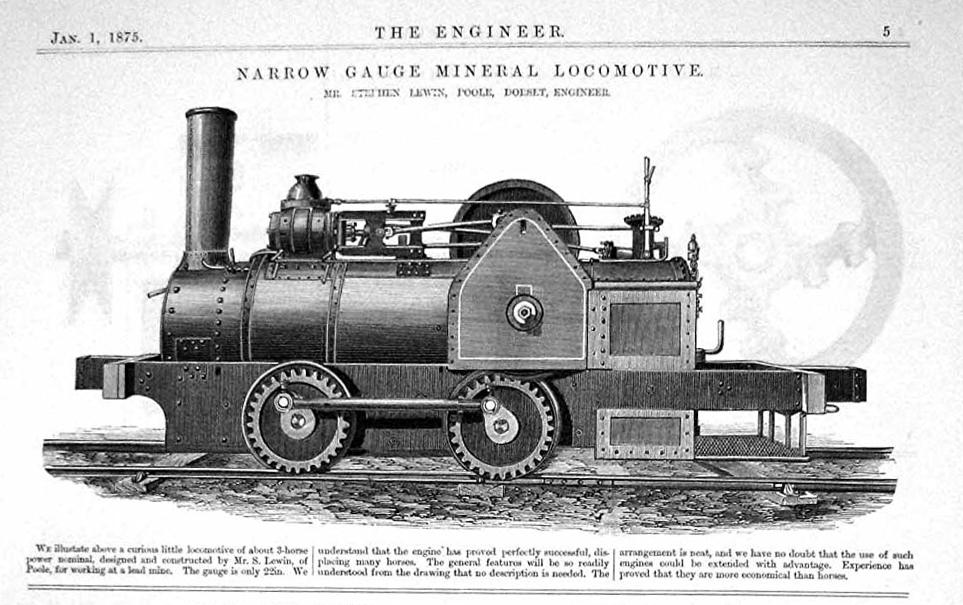
- Lithograph of a narrow gauge locomotive produced by Stephen Lewin of the same design as Samson.
- Born: 1822; London
- Died: 1913; Fulham
- Occupation: Architect

Stephen Lewin (c. 1822 – 1913) was an English architect, artist, civil engineer and iron-founder, who was a builder of steamboats and steam locomotives. Initially he worked in Boston in Lincolnshire as a civil engineer with his father William Lewin, who was an assistant to John Rennie the Elder. He should not be confused with his son, Stephen Samuel Lewin (c. 1848 – 1909), a successful artist who specialized in historical works often featuring cavaliers and figures in 17th-century costumes.

== Architectural practice ==
After working with his civil engineer father, Lewin set up an architectural practice in Boston and simultaneously published a notable series of engravings of Medieval churches in the Parts of Holland in Lincolnshire. He was involved in the civic life in Boston and was Mayor in 1860-2 and 1861-2. His younger brother, Charles Augustus Lewin had moved to Poole in Dorset in 1856 as a timber merchant. In 1863, Lewin, who had entered into a partnership with William Wilkinson, a Boston iron founder, purchased the works of William Pearce, an iron and brass founder in Poole. This was to be managed by Wilkinson and became known as Lewin's Iron Foundry or the Poole Foundry. It appears to have developed rapidly and by about 1866 Lewin left Boston. However, in 1879, partly as the result of a fire in the foundry, Lewin was declared bankrupt.

== Locomotives ==
Only a small number of locomotives were built, including:

- 0-4-0 locomotive of 1875, for the 1 ft 10 in (559 mm) gauge Cornish Hush Mine, Howden Burn.
- 0-4-0 Ant and Bee, for the 20 in (508 mm) gauge Great Laxey Mine Railway, Isle of Man
- 0-4-0ST for Seaham Harbour, County Durham
- 0-4-0 steam tram engine for Guernsey Railway
- 0-4-0 with rear tank, 3 ft 5 1/2 in (1,055 mm) gauge, outside flanges, (photographed at) Swanscombe Cement Works.
- 0-4-0 Tiny, a 3 ft 9 in (1,143 mm) gauge loco for the Fayle's Tramway on the Isle of Purbeck.

== Preservation ==
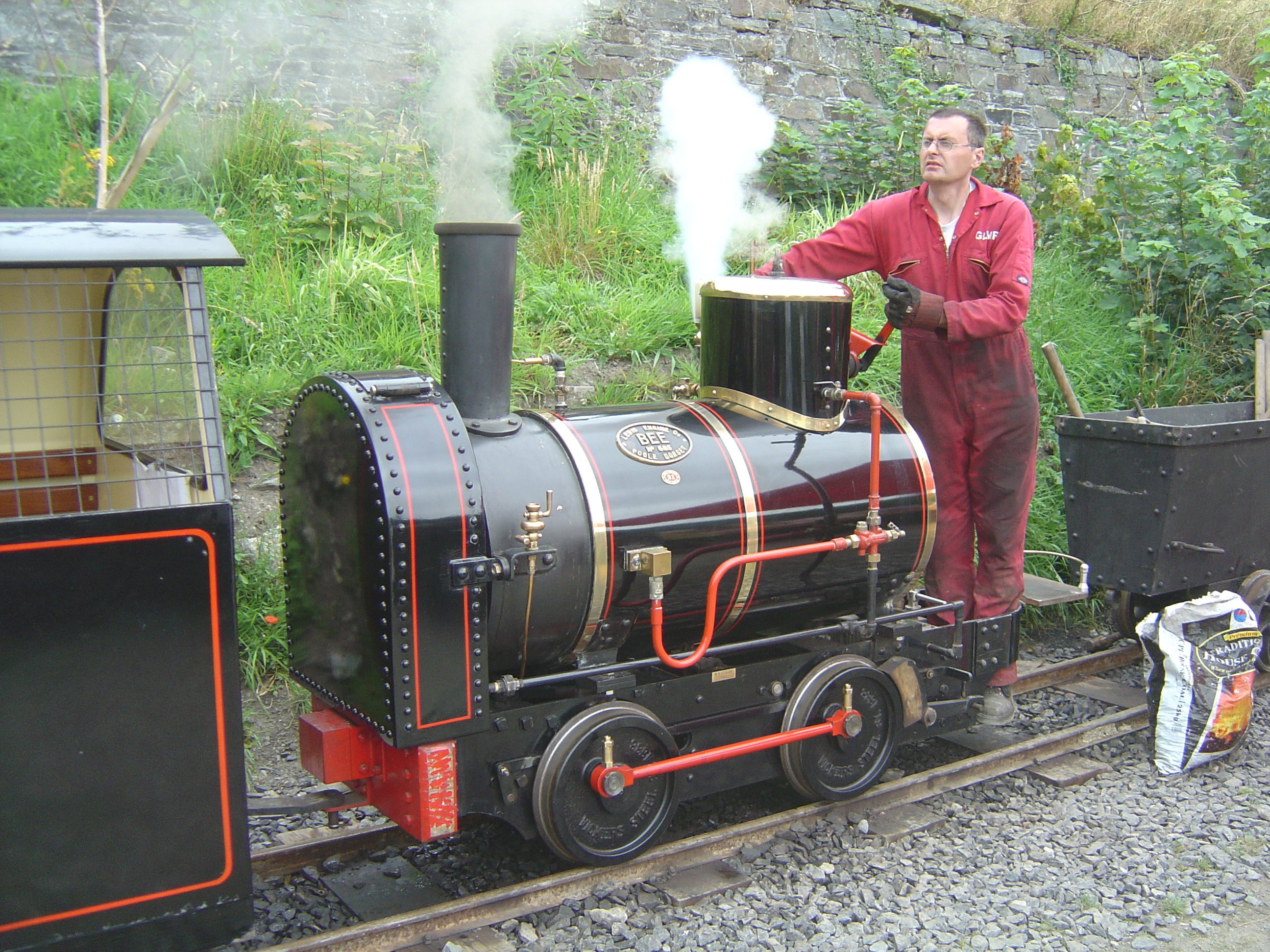
Replica Bee with a train in 2005

The 0-4-0ST locomotive preserved at Beamish Museum is the former Seaham Harbour Dock Company No. 18. It was built in 1877 (Works No. 683) as a well tank, later modified with side 'wing' tanks, and in 1936 outshopped as a saddle tank after extensive rebuilding at the Seaham Harbour Engine Works.

The above dates are a result of new research by the curator currently charged with restoring the locomotive to working order (as a saddle tank) and can be verified against assumptions made in some established texts. The locomotive was supplied to the Londonderry (Seaham to Sunderland) Railway, who operated Seaham Harbour, transferring to the SHDC in 1899 upon the latter's incorporation.

Withdrawn from service circa 1969/70, the locomotive was condemned as a working engine, later being transferred to the collection at Beamish (The North of England Open Air Museum). In 1977, it was 'restored' to its as-built appearance by Laings of Hartlepool, returning to Beamish where it was operated for four years. It was later loaned to a group based at Padiham Power Station, though their restoration attempt failed. Returned to Beamish it was placed on display with some work to restore it being completed before a serious bid was commenced in 2005. Now returned to steam, the loco has run a few times at Beamish, with some fettling still to do. It made a brief visit back to its former home of Seaham in 2011.

== Replicas ==
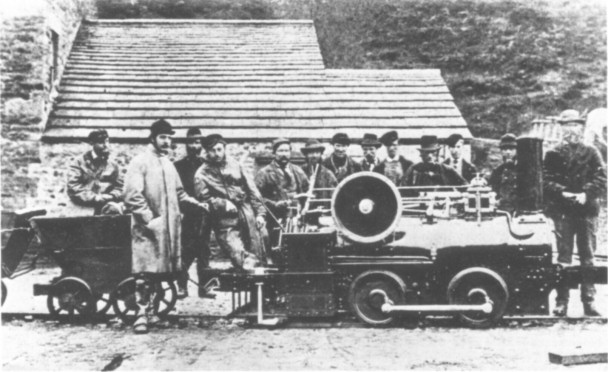
A Lewin locomotive used at the Cornish Hush Mine, Howden Burn

Ant and Bee were scrapped but replicas have been built for the Great Laxey Mine Railway.

A replica of Samson was completed in 2016.

== Architecture by Lewin ==
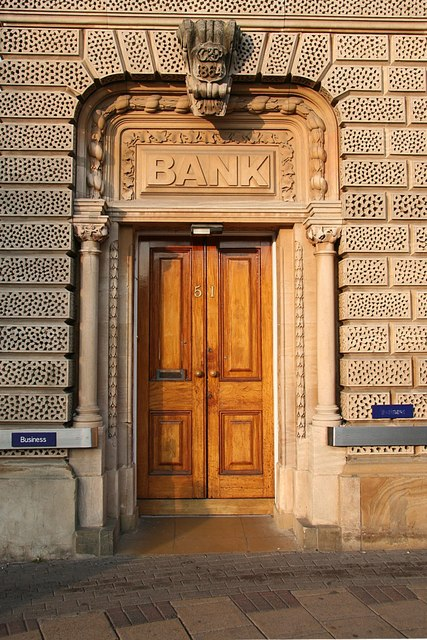
Lloyds Bank, Boston. Designed by Lewin

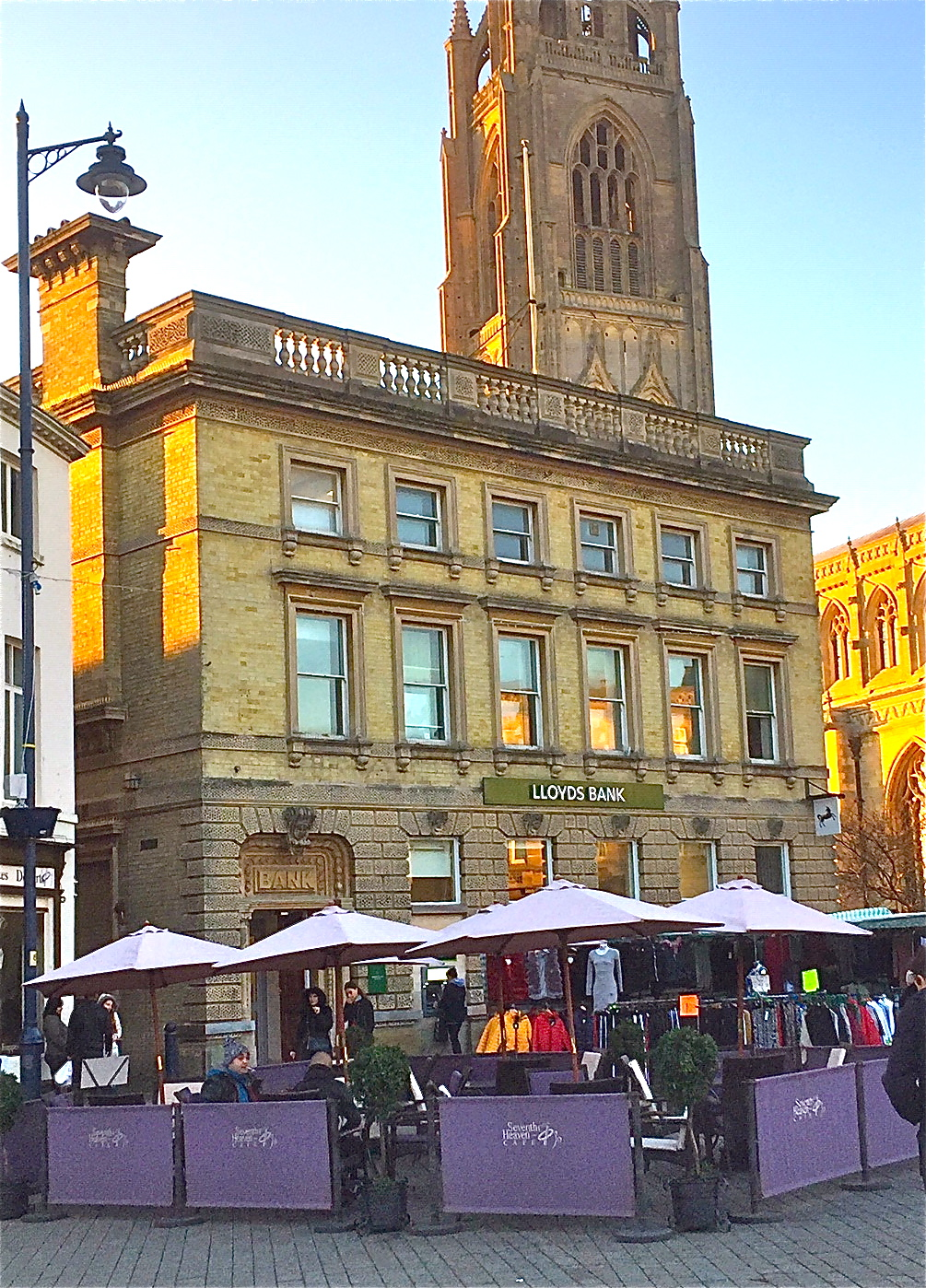
Lloyds Bank, Boston, Lincolnshire

- Garfit & Claypon's Bank (now Lloyds Bank), 51 Market Place Boston. 1864. Designed by Stephen Lewin just before he left Boston for Poole. This replaced the original Garfit and Claypon Bank in the High Street which had been founded in 1754. Three storey building with six bay front with ashlar plinth, vermiculated ashlar rustication to ground floor, sill bands, heavy stone cornice, moulded balusters and stone panels to parapet. To left a doorway with elliptical arched head with heavy console keystone dated 1864.

=== Churches ===
==== Lincolnshire ====
- St Gilbert, Brothertoft. Rebuilt Nave and bell-cot of 1847.
- St Helen, East Keal. Tower of church rebuilt by Lewin in 1853-4.
- Holy Trinity, Spilsby road, Horncastle. Chapel of ease designed by Lewin 1847-8.
- St Magaret, Saleby. 1850
- St Mary Swineshead. Re-built the chancel in 1847.
- Langton St Andrew, Station Road, Woodhall Spa. Church with bell-cot by Lewin. Destroyed by a bomb in 1943.

=== Congregational Chapel ===
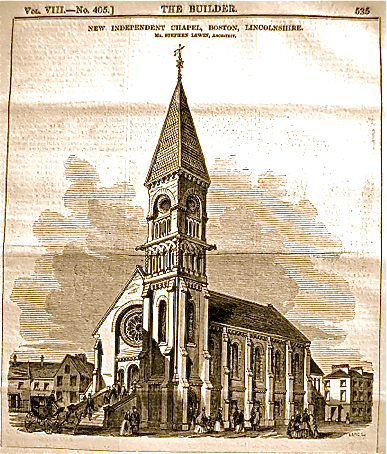
Congregational Chapel, Red Lion Street, Boston

- Congregational Chapel (1850) Red Lion Street, Boston. On the site of the old Theatre. Described in White's Directory, 1856 as a beautiful specimen of architecture in stone coloured brick, all the columns, caps, bases, cornices, arches buttresses, etc being of bricks moulded and burnt for the purpose. At the north-west angle is an elegant tower, crowned by a short spire; and over the entrance is a large and handsome rose window. The other windows and arches have semi-circular heads, except the school, which occupies the basement storey, and has square-headed windows.

== Gallery: Churches by Stephen Lewin ==
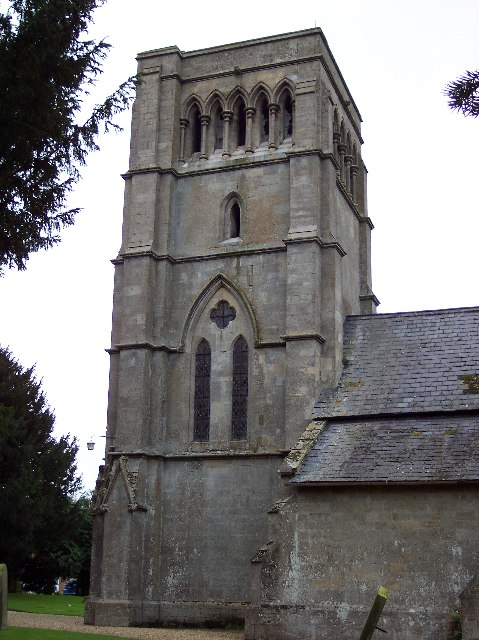
St. Helen, East Keal, Lincs - Tower by Lewin

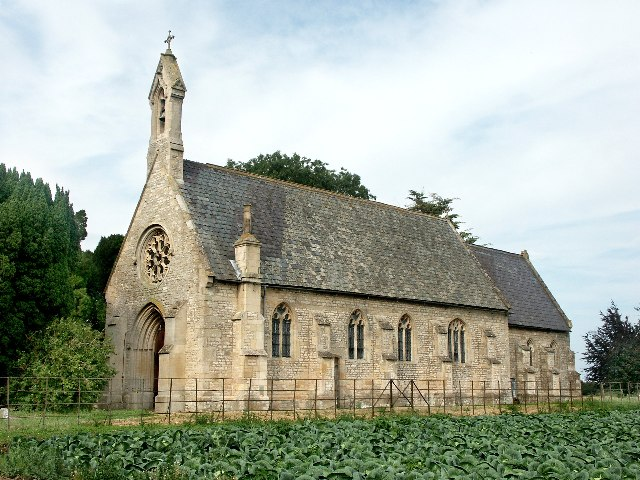
Brothertoft - St Gilbert of Sempringham

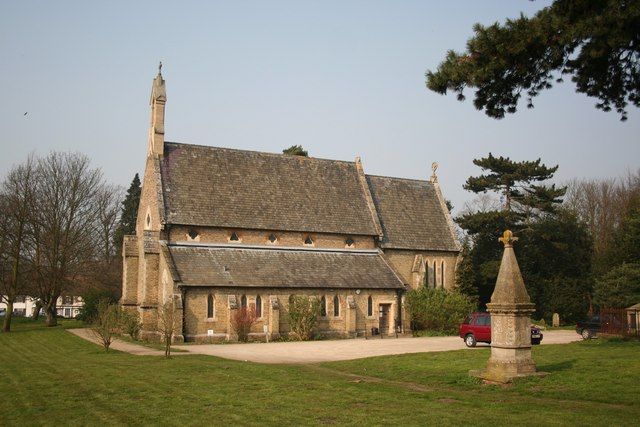
Holy Trinity church, Horncastle

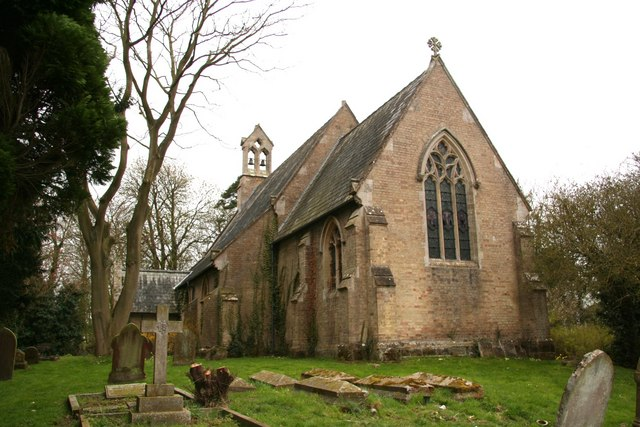
St.Margaret's church, Saleby, 1850
