= Tin bounds =

Ancient legal arrangement

Tin bounds were an ancient legal arrangement used in the counties of Devon and Cornwall in South West England to encourage the exploitation of land for the extraction of tin.

Tin bounds were created by the miner (or 'bounder') pitching stones or turves at the four corners of the land he intended to work. The bounder was required to declare his bounds to the stannary court and to renew them annually by re-pitching the stones or turves. During the early history of mining, the bounder was also required to actually work the land for tin in order for the bounds to remain valid, although this requirement was diluted over time.

Tin bounds did not confer any rights of ownership over the land, only protection against others mining for tin in the same plot of land. The arrangement applied only to tin, not to other metals or minerals.

The bounder was required to pay the freeholder of the land a portion of the tin extracted. This portion was known as toll tin.

Although tin bounding has never been abolished, the use of tin bounds as the mechanism for permitting and regulating the right to work for tin was later superseded by the use of mining setts.

== See also ==
- Dartmoor tin-mining
