= Snaefell Mine =

Mine in Isle of Man, United Kingdom

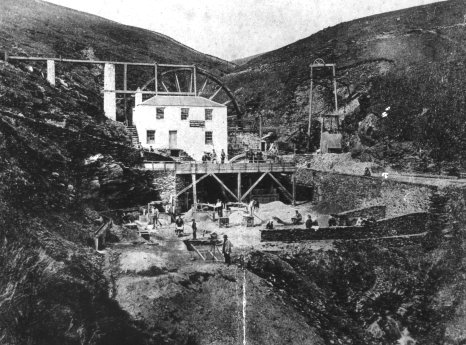
- The Great Snaefell Mine 1900.

- Location in Isle of Man
- Location: Snaefell, Isle of Man, , Isle of Man, British Isles; 54°15′46.8″N 004°27′43.2″W
- Products: Zinc
- Opened: 1856
- Closed: 1908
- Company: The Great Snaefell Mining Company Limited
- Website: Manx mines - Snaefell Mine

The Great Snaefell Mine, also referred to as the East Snaefell Mine, was a zinc mine located high in the Laxey Valley on the slopes of Snaefell Mountain, in the parish of Lonan, Isle of Man. The mine reached a depth of 1,188 ft (362 m) and is remembered as the scene of the Isle of Man's worst mining disaster in 1897. The disaster was caused by carbon monoxide produced by burning timber, and led to the deaths of several miners.

== History ==
Mining for metals on the Isle of Man probably began as early as the Bronze Age. Early sites have been identified at Langness and at Bradda Head, where copper could be seen outcropping in the cliffs.

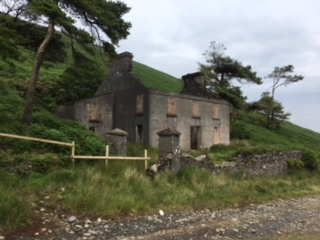
A view of the Mine Captain's House at the Great Snaefell Mine

Snaefell Mine was situated at the eastern foot of Snaefell; the mineral vein was originally discovered in the bed of a stream. The mining sett was 567 acres (229 hectares) in area and was originally a portion of the Great Laxey Mining Company's property. The sett was surrounded by that of the Great Laxey Mining Company and ran parallel with the Great Laxey lodes.

At the pit head there was a washing floor, fitted with washing and dressing appliances, together with a 50 feet (15 m) diameter waterwheel. The mine's buildings were the Mine Captain's house, two cottages, an agent's office, a smithy and a carpenter's workshop. A lead store was also erected.

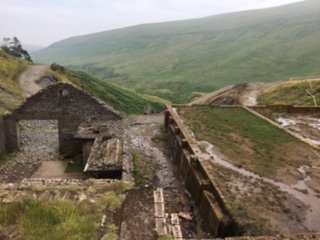
A view across the washing floors of the Great Snaefell Mine

The mine was worked by a main shaft, which followed the dip of the vein. The shaft was rectangular, and divided into three compartments: the middle one was the ladderway; one other compartment was used for winding ore, and the other compartment for the pump and the compressed air pipes. The ore would be wound up in a rough wooden kibble.

In the shaft the ventilation was natural, driven by the higher temperature underground compared to above ground. The general tendency of the air current was down the shaft to the bottom of the mine, and up through the various winzes (intermediate shafts) to the adit level. The open end of the adit had been connected to a sloping wooden chimney on the hillside, by which means the draught was increased.

The shaft was originally sunk to a depth of 15 fathoms, subsequently being extended to over 100 fathoms (600 feet (180 m)) with levels extended respectively at 25, 40, 50, 60 and 70 fathoms north, and at 60 fathoms south. The 40 fathom (240 feet (73 m)) level was driven to 96 fathoms (576 feet (176 m)), passing through a long run of ore which was followed by a rich find of lead ore in the mine during further working in 1871. In addition an adit level was driven north at a distance of 160 fathoms (960 feet (290 m)) to intersect with a very large east–west lode, with another adit driven south to 70 fathoms. After a new working was opened at the 75 fathom (450 feet (140 m)) level in 1873, a substantial discovery of rich silver ore was made.

Extraction of the ore had begun in 1856; the mine was originally worked by the Great Laxey Mining Company until 1864. The Snaefell Mining Company was then formed to work the mine, but by the late 1860s it was in financial difficulties, and it went into liquidation in 1870. The whole mine was then bought for £4,000 by James Spittall, Alfred Adams, Thomas Wilson and Henry Noble, directors of the Great Laxey Mining Company, who then formed the Great Snaefell Mining Company in 1871. The company's capital was £25,000, in 25,000 £1 shares. About 50% of the shares were taken up by shareholders of the former operator, and the other 50% by directors of the Laxey Mines, such as Spittall and Henry Noble. The chief engineer of the mine (referred to as the Captain of the Mine) at this time was Henry James.

The cost of extracting ore from the mine continued to plague operations, and in 1883, following continued financial difficulties, the Great Snaefell Mining Company also went into liquidation.

The operation of the mine was then taken on by the newly formed Snaefell Mining Company, which had been registered on 24 December 1883. The principal shareholders were essentially those of the previous company, who had taken advantage of a clause in the company's articles which empowered the directors to sell their shares, to then have them re-sold to a third party, and then transferred to the original shareholders. A meeting of the shareholders was subsequently held; and the plan arranged was submitted to and adopted by the meeting. The difficulties of this arrangement were eventually overcome, and 6,000 more shares were issued.

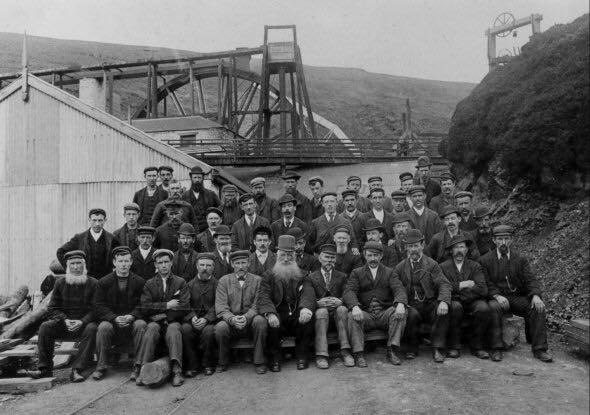
Miners pictured at the Great Snaefell Mine, 1897. The redoubtable Captain Kewley pictured front center.

=== 1897 Disaster ===
By 1897 the Snaefell mine had become increasingly difficult to work, due to insufficient ventilation (the lowest depth of the mine shaft by this time was 171 fathoms (1,026 ft (312.7 m)). This ongoing problem had become increasingly acute as the various levels were driven further from the main shaft. During the preceding two years the mine had had to be closed during the hottest part of the summer, usually in July and August.

In early May 1897, dynamite had been used to extend the workings in the lowest part, and the mine had been inspected by the government inspector, along with the mine captain, on Friday 7 May, to check there was enough ventilation. Their findings were satisfactory.

Miners had finished their shift on 8 May, and the mine was closed on 9 May. Due to inadequate safety measures a stray candle had been allowed to continue burning. This set fire to a nearby pit prop and started a fire in the shaft. The fire continued burning as long as oxygen was present; this produced carbon monoxide, which filled the lower parts of the shaft.

On 10 May at 6 am, 40 miners reported for the early shift, 34 of these were required for the shift, and began descending into the mine using the ladders which were lashed against the side of the shaft. When they reached the lower parts of the shaft, they encountered the poisonous fumes, and immediately had breathing difficulties. They at once began to vacate the shaft. Those at the top got out without too much difficulty, but others arrived at the surface in a state of near collapse, and it soon became apparent that a large number of the miners who had made the descent were unable to return. A rescue party was quickly assembled, but were beaten back by the noxious air.

Messengers were despatched for help; and around 40 miners from the Great Laxey Mine arrived together with a doctor, but it was several hours before it was deemed safe even to enter the mine. When it was judged safe to re-enter, the first body of one of the miners, James Kneale, was discovered draped on the ladder. By piercing a compressed air pipe, it was possible to revive him sufficiently for him to be supported up the shaft. Two other miners were then rescued alive, but the second was in critical condition. Diving dresses arrived from Douglas but were found to be of no use; however the pumps and hoses were of significant help, enabling the rescuers to take a supply of clean air with them into the shaft. Led by Captain Kewley the rescuers went deeper into the shaft, where several dead bodies were found, however no effort was made to remove them as long as there was a chance of finding anyone alive. By 10 pm, three dead bodies had been sent to the surface, leaving 16 miners unaccounted for. The rescue was suspended at 11 pm.

The search resumed the following morning, Tuesday. A box had been sent up from the Laxey Mines, better suited to hauling bodies out of the shaft. A telegram had been sent to the Foxdale Mines, and miners had arrived from there to assist, along with the Foxdale Mines Captain, William Kitto. By 11 am, the rescuers had reached the 100 fathom level and eight bodies had been recovered from the mine.

At the 115 fathom level the air was still deemed too poisonous for the rescuers, as shown by the immediate extinguishing of candles lowered further into the shaft. The Mine Inspector tried to obtain a sample of air for testing, but was almost immediately overcome by the air and was quickly hauled back up the shaft. The body of a miner was observed at the 130 fathom level; however the rescuers were unable to reach it because of the air, and the search was again suspended.

On Wednesday, what had by then become a recovery mission recommenced, consisting of Foxdale miners with a Snaefell miner working as pilot. At that time six men were still unaccounted for, ten having been recovered the previous day and three on Monday evening. In order to clear the shaft as much as possible before the recovery party descended, every available means of pumping air into the shaft was used. During the morning, the bodies of John Fayle, John Oliver, John James Oliver, John Kewin and Walter Christian were recovered, leaving only the body of Robert Kelly in the mine.

The air in the shaft was still proving to be restrictive to the rescue. Whilst trying to take an air sample at the 100 fathom level, Captain Kewley was overcome and had to be hauled back to the surface. One of the Foxdale miners was also overcome, and they could not recover the body of Robert Kelly from the 130 fathom level.

==== Sir Clement Le Neve Foster arrives ====
On Thursday morning Sir Clement Le Neve Foster, Chief Inspector of Mines, arrived at Snaefell and began tests to determine the extent of poisonous gas which remained in the mine. Lighted candles were lowered to the 130 fathom level in a kibble. When the kibble was pulled back to the surface after 10 minutes, all the candles were found to be extinguished. A mouse was then lowered to the level in a cage and again left for 10 minutes, but it was dead when the cage was returned. Candles were in turn sent down to the 115 fathom level, and these stayed lit, indicating better air at that level. Despite the risks, 13 miners descended the shaft to try to recover Kelly's body, but after several hours they returned to the surface without recovering it. The dead mouse, together with several sample bottles taken from below the 115 fathom level, were sent to London for examination. The examination was carried out by the eminent physiologist John Scott Haldane, one of the foremost authorities on the causes of mining deaths due to gases.

In his report Haldane stated:

Sir, I beg to report as follows on the articles transmitted to me for examination in connection with the Snaefell disaster.

The articles which had been forwarded to the Home Office by Dr Le Neve Foster, H.M. Inspector of Mines, consisted of two dead mice and two samples of air contained in bottles. The bottles were closed by corks, which had been sealed and were found to be perfectly air-tight.

The first mouse examined was labelled as follows:- Snaefell Mine, No. 1, 13th May. Mouse lowered into the mine in a kibble as far as 130 fathom level, came tip alive, but legs paralysed; killed on reaching the surface.

The blood on dilution with water was found to have the pink tint characteristic of carbon monoxide poisoning. Judging roughly by the tint, I estimated that the hemoglobin was about 80 per cent saturated with carbon monoxide. An exact determination could not be made, as the light was failing at the time when the articles for examination were received.

The second mouse was labelled:- Snaefell Mine, No. 2, May 13th, 1897. Mouse taken down into the mine and lowered from the platform at the foot of the 4th ladder below the 115 fathom level to a platform some 25 feet below it. Mouse had suffered and was killed at once.

The blood of this mouse had also the characteristic tint of carbon monoxide poisoning. The saturation of the hemoglobin was exactly determined and found to be 78.3 per cent.

The bottles containing the samples of air were both labelled as follows:-'Sample of air from shaft of Snaefell Mine just above 130 fathom level, 12th May 1897, C. Le Neve Foster.'

The composition of the sample in the first bottle opened was found to be as follows:

Percentage.

Oxygen - 15.48% Carbon dioxide - 4.221% Carbon monoxide - 1.07% Hydrogen - 0.48% Nitrogen and Argon - 78.75%

The gas in the second (larger) bottle had the following composition

Percentage

Oxygen - 15.52% Carbon dioxide - 4.26% Carbon monoxide - 1.10% Nitrogen and Argon - 79.12%

As the second sample was evidently the same in composition as the first, the hydrogen was not determined separately. The carbon monoxide was in each case determined colorimetrically with blood solution, and the hydrogen by passing over a glowing platinum spiral. The carbon dioxide formed by contact with the platinum corresponded exactly to the carbon monoxide known to be present, so that no appreciable proportion of methane or other hydrocarbons can have been present.

The composition of the sample corresponds to a mixture produced by the combustion of wood or other similar material. Inhalation of air of this composition would produce helplessness (in a man) within about seven or eight minutes at most, and would soon cause death. A candle would not burn in such air, but would just do so on the addition of a third of its volume of fresh air. The mixture would then still be intensely poisonous, and would still be if diluted with four times its volume of fresh air. When diluted with nine times its volume of fresh air it would still be capable of rendering a man incapable of walking.

I am, Sir, your obedient servant, JOHN HALDANE.

The Under Secretary of State, Home Department.

— OXFORD, May 19th, 1897.

The reason for the continued presence of the gas in the lower parts of the mine was found during a further investigation by Sir Clement Le Neve Foster.

Snaefell Mine consisted of a single working shaft mine, and in addition there was a wooden upcast shaft which followed the slope of Snaefell Mountain in order to assist ventilation. The current of air to this shaft, so as to clear the bottom (171 fathom) level, was arranged by closing of doors opening on to shafts from the higher levels.

When the shift had finished work on Saturday 8 May, all the doors on the higher levels should have been closed, so that the fresh air entering should have been sent through the bottom level of the mine. Initially Foster was at a loss to understand why with the aid of the closed doors the atmospheric current, which should have run into the bottom level, had not cleared the shaft so as to make descent below the 115 fathom level possible.

On making another descent on 15 May Dr Le Neve Foster examined all levels as far down as the 74 fathom level, where he found that a doorway had been left wide open. This proved to him that the entire volume of clean air entering the mine turned away at the 74 fathom level, and through that and the levels above returned by the upcast shaft and vented back into the atmosphere.

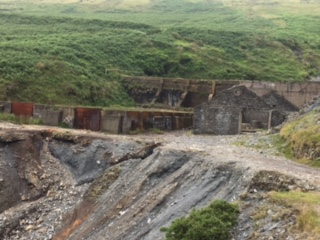
Workings of the Great Snaefell Mine

==== Continued efforts to retrieve the body of Robert Kelly ====
Foster conducted further tests with mice which proved that things were much in the same condition; and it then seemed probable that the door at the 130 fathom level was open, allowing the air going down the main shaft to escape through this level to the succession of intermediate shafts which formed the upcast - without going to the lower levels at all. Foster was therefore of the opinion that this door should be closed if possible in order that the body of Robert Kelly could be brought up.

Foster, Captain Kewley and Captain Reddicliffe, together with a party of miners, went down to the 115 fathom level, and before descending any further tested the air by lowering a tame rat in a cage, from platform to platform. Leaving most of the miners at the 115 fathom level, Captain Kewley, Captain Reddicliffe and Dr Foster proceeded further down the shaft and reached a level about 10 ft (3.0 m) above the body of Robert Kelly in safety and lowered the testing apparatus with its candle alight, where they could see the body of Kelly, lying in the position described by the Foxdale team during their previous descent. Just at the level of the body, the candle went out and Foster let the cage with the rat remain down for 5 minutes. When brought up it was not dead, though visibly affected. Captain Kewley and Clague volunteered to go down and get the body, but their request was refused by Dr Foster due to the carbon monoxide. However it was thought possible to secure Kelly's body by means of a grappling hook. This action appeared to disturb the gas: Captain Kewley immediately began to feel unwell and had to be put into the kibble and taken to the surface. Foster and the rest of the recovery team who had stayed at the 115 fathom level also began to feel the effects of gas, and immediately returned to the surface.

It was found on testing the air, day after day, by lowering mice and candles from the surface, that the atmosphere of the mine was improving gradually under the influence of the natural ventilation. However it was not until 7 June that it was finally deemed safe for men to descend to the 130 fathom level and the body of Robert Kelly was finally brought to the surface.

==== Inquest ====
An inquest was opened at the Snaefell Mine on the afternoon of Wednesday 12 May, presided over by the coroner, Samuel Harris. The bodies, except that of Robert Kelly, were identified by Captain Kewley following which they were released for burial.

==== Cause of accident ====
It had been ascertained that carbonic oxide occurred in certain rocks and minerals, however such gas had never been found as a natural constituent of the atmosphere of mines. It was evident, therefore, that the deaths of the victims of the Snaefell disaster was due to carbon monoxide (CO), produced by timber burning in the mine. The next point for consideration was how the timber became ignited; and this involved two possible explanations:

1. A lighted candle stuck up against one of the timber supports.
2. The spontaneous combustion of cotton waste impregnated with oil, which had been in use by the men who were working rock drills.

The inspection of the mine revealed that the seat of the fire was at the 130 fathom level, where men had been engaged in putting in fresh timber, and not in the 171 fathom level, or in the levels above it, where machine drills were being employed. Thus, one can reasonably dismiss explanation 2 and conclude that the cause was explanation 1.

The timber in parts of the 130 fathom level was very dry, and would easily have caught fire. It would follow therefore as to how the ignition of the timber could escape the knowledge of the men during the shift.

At the time of the accident, it was common practice for miners to have a safety helmet with a candle held in its clay socket. Once nearly burnt out, the miner would stick up the end against the side of his working place, whether timbered or not, take a fresh candle from his bundle, and light it from the flame of the old one. He would then blow out the flame of the candle end, with the intention of using it as a "snuff" for igniting the fuse of some future explosive. Careless miners would sometimes leave a candle end to burn away of itself, whilst in other cases the snuffing out could be imperfectly performed and the wick could go on smouldering, and eventually ignite inflammable material with which it was in contact. So it is quite easy to account for the ignition, and some facts ascertained at the inquest fully confirmed this belief. At the inquest, Captain Reddicliffe stated that he thought he could recollect no fewer than five similar occurrences in the Laxey Mine and two at other mines.

Once started upon a timber prop, the fire would have naturally spread to the adjacent supports, and would have continued to burn as long as plenty of air was available. When the combustion of the supporting frames so weakened them that they gave way under the weight of the waste material lying on them it would have caused a block at that level; the timber then burning in a sort of cul-de-sac, would not have received all the oxygen necessary for the complete combustion of the carbon; the result was that CO was generated in addition to CO_{2}.

==== List of those killed ====
Name	Age	Job description	Place of residence	Status
Joseph Moughtin	28	miner	Laxey	married, one child
Louis Kinrade	38	miner	Laxey	single
William Christian	26	labourer	Abbeylands	single
Walter Christian	21	labourer	Abbeylands	single (brother of the above)
William Kewin	24	labourer	Baldhoon	single
John Kewin	29	labourer	Baldhoon	single (brother of the above)
William Senogles	46	miner	Laxey	married, one (adopted) child
Robert Lewney	24	labourer	Laxey	single
Edward Kinrade	27	labourer	Laxey	married, four children
John Oliver	57	miner	Agneash	married, four children
John James Oliver	22	labourer	Agneash	single (son of the above)
Robert Cannell	41	waggoner	Baldhoon	married, eight children
John Kewley	32	kibble man	Baldhoon	single
Edward Kewley	22	labourer	Agneash	single
Robert Kelly	21	labourer	Laxey Glen	single
Frank Christian	39	waggoner	Sulby Glen	single
Sandy Callan	24	waggoner	Baldrine	married, one child
William Callow	29	miner	Laxey	married, two children
John Fayle	40	waggoner	Baldhoon	married, five children

=== Honours ===
A meeting of the general committee of the Snaefell Mine Disaster Fund, presided over by the Lieutenant Governor of the Isle of Man, Lord Henniker was held on Monday 13 September 1897; it was announced that the Lieutenant Governor had been successful in obtaining for Captain John Kewley and Mr G. Williams under the Metalliferous Mines Regulation Act for the Inspection of Mines in the Isle of Man, the Medal of the Honourable Order of the Knight of St John of Jerusalem. The medal was awarded for the "self-sacrificing exertion and distinguished bravery" displayed under the most trying and hazardous circumstances in their heroic efforts to save life and succour the helpless in connection with the disaster. Governor Henniker was a Knight of Justice of the Honourable Order, and as such he had been requested to make the presentation on behalf of the Prince of Wales. The presentation took place at the Working Men's Institute, Laxey, on Saturday 25 September.

== Subsequent use ==
Following the disaster mining resumed, however the yield from the mine continued to decline. Following a substantial rock fall in the shaft in 1908 it was decided that the clearance of the debris would prove to be uneconomical and the mine was closed.

=== Re-opening ===
An illustration of how the spoil reside from Snaefell would have been crushed in a Ball mill.

Although none of the mine workings were re-opened, in 1955 it was thought that re-processing the spoil from the mines could extract a further yield of ore. A company, Metalliferous Holdings Ltd, had been formed employing 22 men in the undertaking working around the clock. Spoil residue was tipped into an automatic sieve and in turn fed into an 80-ton Ball mill which the company had sourced from the Gold Coast. The process saw the spoil crushed by steel balls and chemicals and then passed on to the flotation tanks where it was conditioned by more chemicals, automatically skimmed, and finally dried off into powder. Spoil was also brought to Snaefell from the former Foxdale Mines.

The venture was an initial success with the result that a Canadian mining company, Amanda Mines Ltd, proposed a merger with Metalliferous Holdings Ltd. An audit had found that approximately 400,000 tons of lead-zinc spoil was situated at the former pit heads at Laxey and Foxdale. At the end of May 1956 Amanda Mines took over Metalliferous Holdings Ltd with Metalliferous Holdings becoming a subsidiary of Amanda Mines. The operation yielded £60,000 in 1956. Production ceased in July 1958 as a consequence of a fall in the price of lead.

== Gallery ==
Great Snaefell Mine
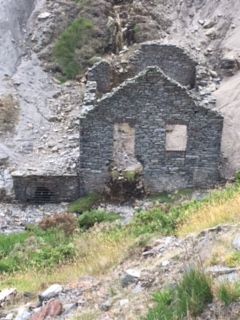
Mine Buildings at the Great Snaefell Mine

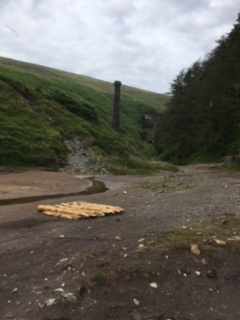
Mine workings at the Great Snaefell Mine

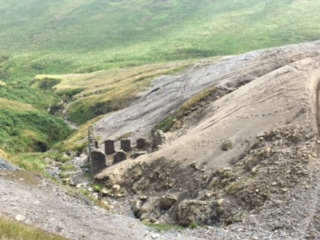
Spoil from the washing floors of the Great Snaefell Mine

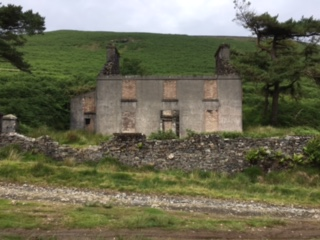
The house of the Captain of the Great Snaefell Mine

== See also ==
- Snaefell
- Snaefell Wheel
- Laxey Wheel
- Great Laxey Mine
- Great Laxey Mine Railway

== Sources ==
Bibliography

- Report to the Home Secretary on the Circumstances attending the Underground Fire at the Snaefell Lead Mine in the Month of May 1897, by C. Le Neve Foster, Esq., D.Sc., F.R.S., one of H.M. Inspectors of mines
- Manx Mines, Rocks, and Minerals. Published by the Manx Heritage Foundation in co-operation with Manx National Heritage. 1994
- Bawden T.A., Garrad L.S., Qualtrough J.W., and Scatchard W.R. The Industrial Archaeology of the Isle of Man. Published by David & Charles, 1972. (out of print)
- Industrial Archaeology of the Isle of Man - an Introduction. Produced by Manx National Heritage, 1993. Published by the Manx Experience.
- Lady Isabella and the Great Laxey Mine - Official Guide. Jointly published by the Manx Experience and The Manx Museum and National Trust.
