= Toll tin =

Toll tin or tin toll was a toll payable in tin mining in Devon and Cornwall in south-west England. The holder of a set of tin bounds was required to pay the freeholder of the land on which the bounds had been pitched a portion, called toll tin, of the tin ore (or black tin) extracted.

Toll tin became due as soon as the ore was broken from the ground and, although some freeholders may have taken it in this form, it is likely that others opted for the more practical approach of taking it as a portion of the proceeds of the sale of the refined tin (or white tin).

Toll tin was not the only way in which a miner's share of the tin extracted was reduced — he was also required to pay a tax to the Crown on the refined tin, known as tin coinage, before the tin could legally be sold.

== See also ==
- Dartmoor tin mining
