= Mining sett =

Legal arrangement related to tin mining

Mining setts were a legal arrangement used historically in the counties of Devon and Cornwall in South West England to manage the exploitation of land for the extraction of tin. The term was also used on the Isle of Man.

They were a form of licence by the holder of a set of tin bounds (or bounder) to allow a miner or group of miners (known as adventurers) to work the ground within the bounds for tin. Setts were usually granted subject to conditions, such as the requirement to actually work the ground and were also often limited to a specified depth of ground.

In return for the grant of a sett, the adventurers were required to pay a portion of the tin extracted to the bounders. This portion was known as farm tin. Its payment was in addition to the requirement to pay toll tin to the freeholder of the land and tin coinage duty on the refined tin before it could legally be sold.

== See also ==
- Dartmoor tin-mining
