= Laxey Wheel =

World's largest waterwheel

The Great Laxey Wheel Lady Isabella Wheel
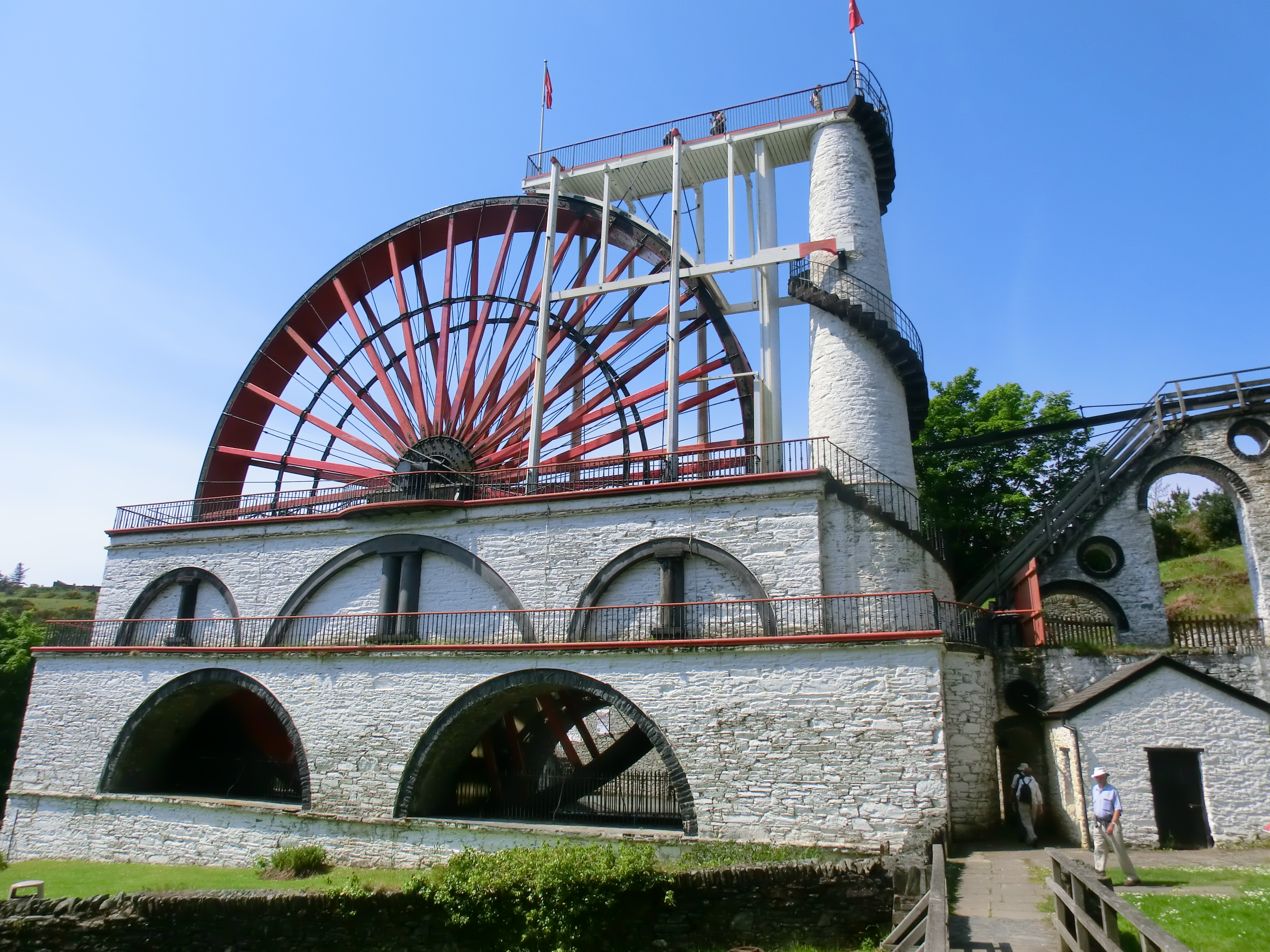

General information
- Type: Water wheel
- Architectural style: Victorian
- Location: Laxey, Isle of Man
- Coordinates: 54°14′18.8″N 4°24′26.6″W
- Owner: Manx National Heritage

Dimensions
- Diameter: 72 feet 6 inches (22.10 m)

Design and construction
- Architect: Robert Casement

The Laxey Wheel (also known as Lady Isabella) is built into the hillside above the village of Laxey in the Isle of Man. It is the largest surviving original working waterwheel in the world. Designed by Robert Casement, the wheel has a 72-foot-6-inch (22.1 m) diameter, is 6 feet (1.8 m) wide and revolves approximately three times per minute.

== History ==
The wheel was built in 1854 to pump water from the Glen Mooar part of the Great Laxey Mines industrial complex. It was named Lady Isabella after the wife of Lieutenant Governor Charles Hope, who was the island's governor at that time.

The wheel is currently maintained by Manx National Heritage as part of the Great Laxey Wheel & Mines Trail.

The wheel features today on the reverse of the £20 notes issued by the Isle of Man Government.

== Technical details ==
A water-powered wheel was used because the Isle of Man has no supply of coal for a steam-powered pump.

Water from the surrounding area – including a number of local springs and streams – is collected in a cistern which is above the level of the top of the wheel. A closed pipe connects the cistern to the top of the wheel; thus the water flows up the tower as an inverted syphon. The water falls from the pipe into the buckets (formed from wooden slats on the circumference) and makes the wheel rotate in what is described as the 'reverse' direction: it is a backshot wheel. The crank has a throw of 4 feet (1.2 m) and connects to a counterweight and to a very long rod. This rod runs along the rod viaduct to the pumping shaft 200m away, where the 8-foot (2.4 m) stroke is converted by a T-rocker into a pumping action.

Most of the wheel and rod is made of wood; while key mechanical parts are metal to provide tension and bearing surfaces. The rod has wheels attached at intervals to permit the stroke's motion with minimal friction.

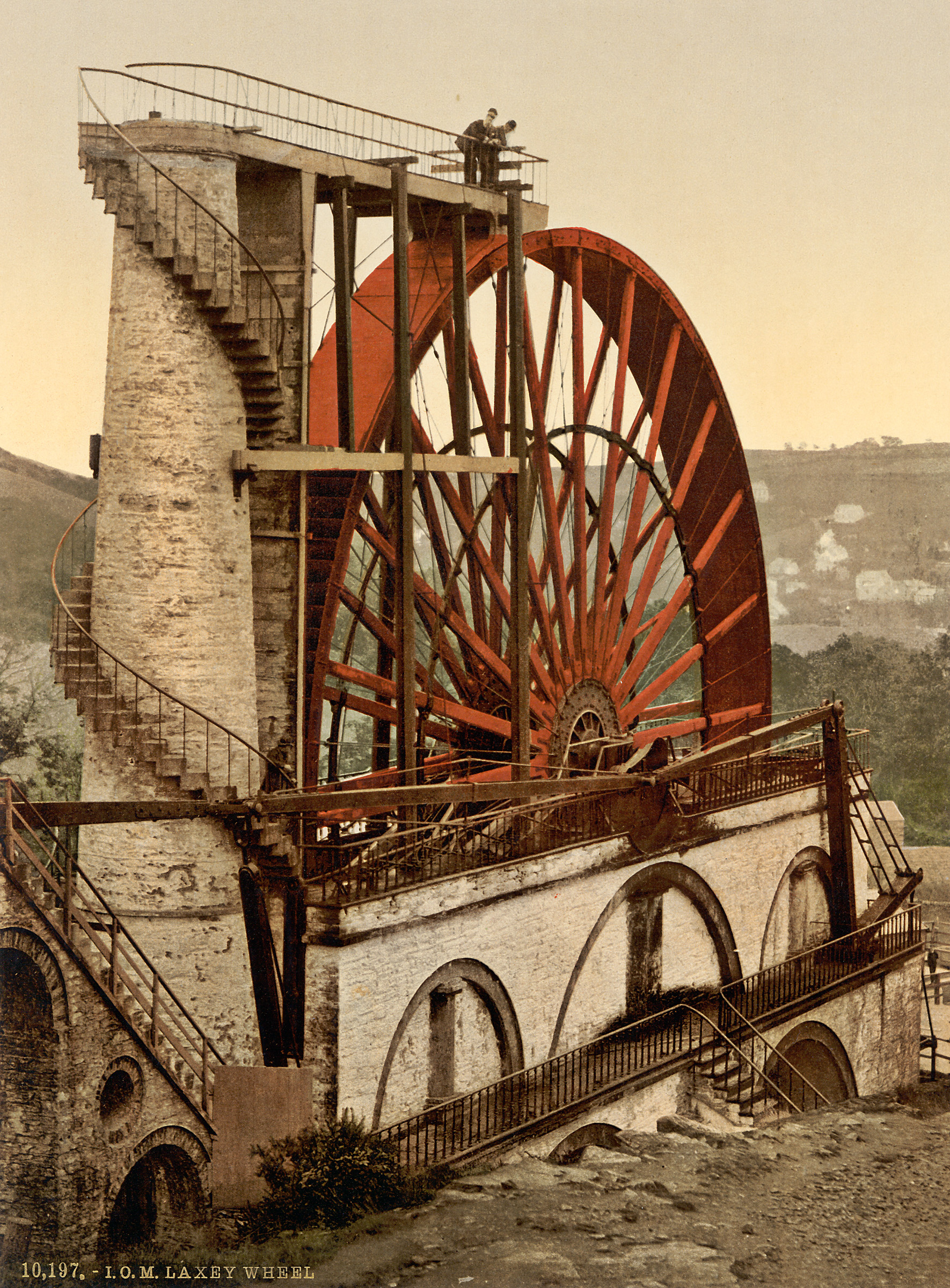
A historical image from around 1900

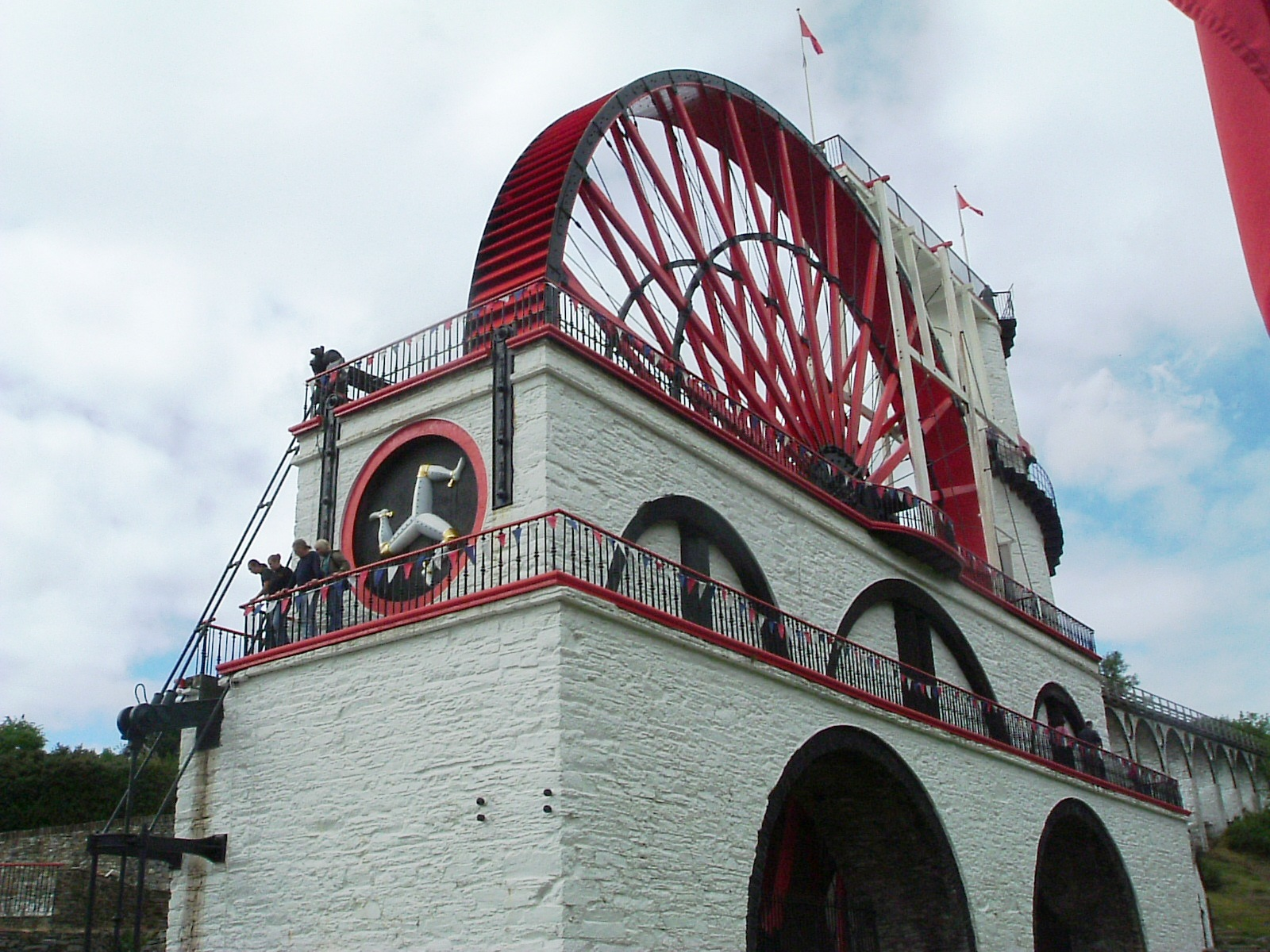
The triskelion on the front of the wheel is backwards. This happened by accident when the image was being transferred onto the wall; they forgot to reverse it, so it is actually a mirror image of the symbol of Mann.

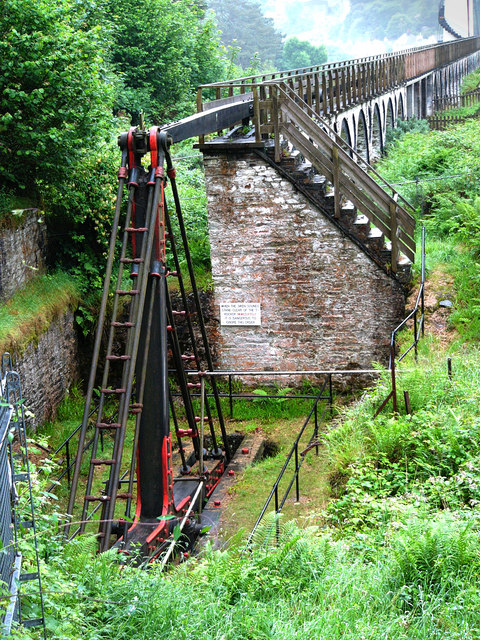
The T-rocker, which transfers the horizontal motion of the crank on the waterwheel axle into a vertical motion to work the pumps in the mine

=== Dimensions ===
- Diameter: 72 ft 6 in. (22.1 m)
- Delivery: 250 imperial gallons (1,100 L) of water a minute from the Laxey mines some 200 yards (180 m) away and 1,500 feet (460 m) below ground

== Mine ==
The mine employed over 600 miners at its peak, producing lead, copper, silver and zinc until it closed in 1929. In 1965 the Manx Government bought the wheel and site. The wheel was restored; in 1989 it was put under the control of Manx National Heritage.

== Musical wheel ==
The wheel has two pieces of music dedicated to it: one penned by Stuart Slack and the other by Helen Barley. Both are entitled The Laxey Wheel.

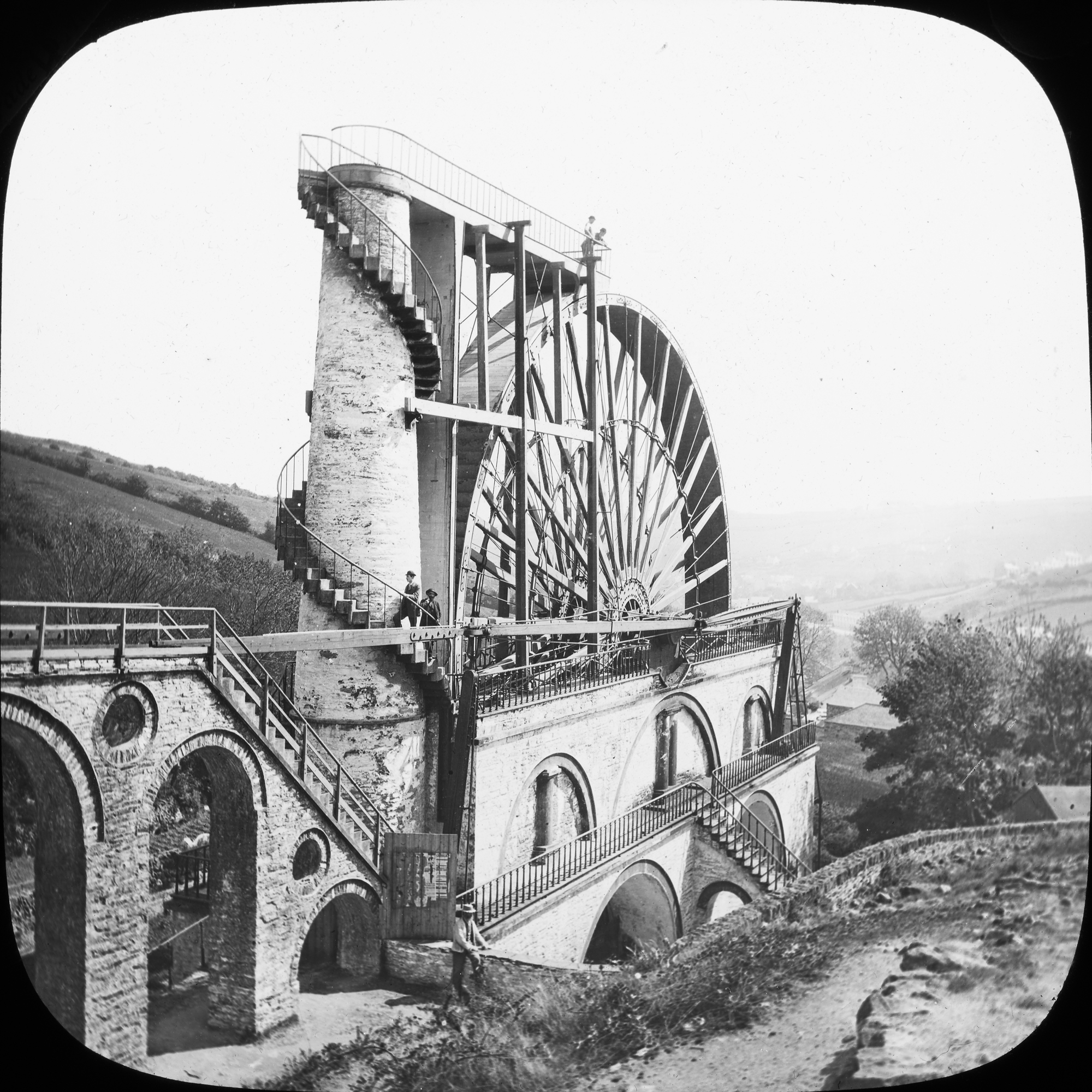

== See also ==
- Snaefell Wheel
- Great Laxey Mine Railway
- Great Snaefell Mine
- Great Laxey Mine
- The Transporters
