= Snaefell Wheel =

Coordinates: 54.2334°N 4.4053°W

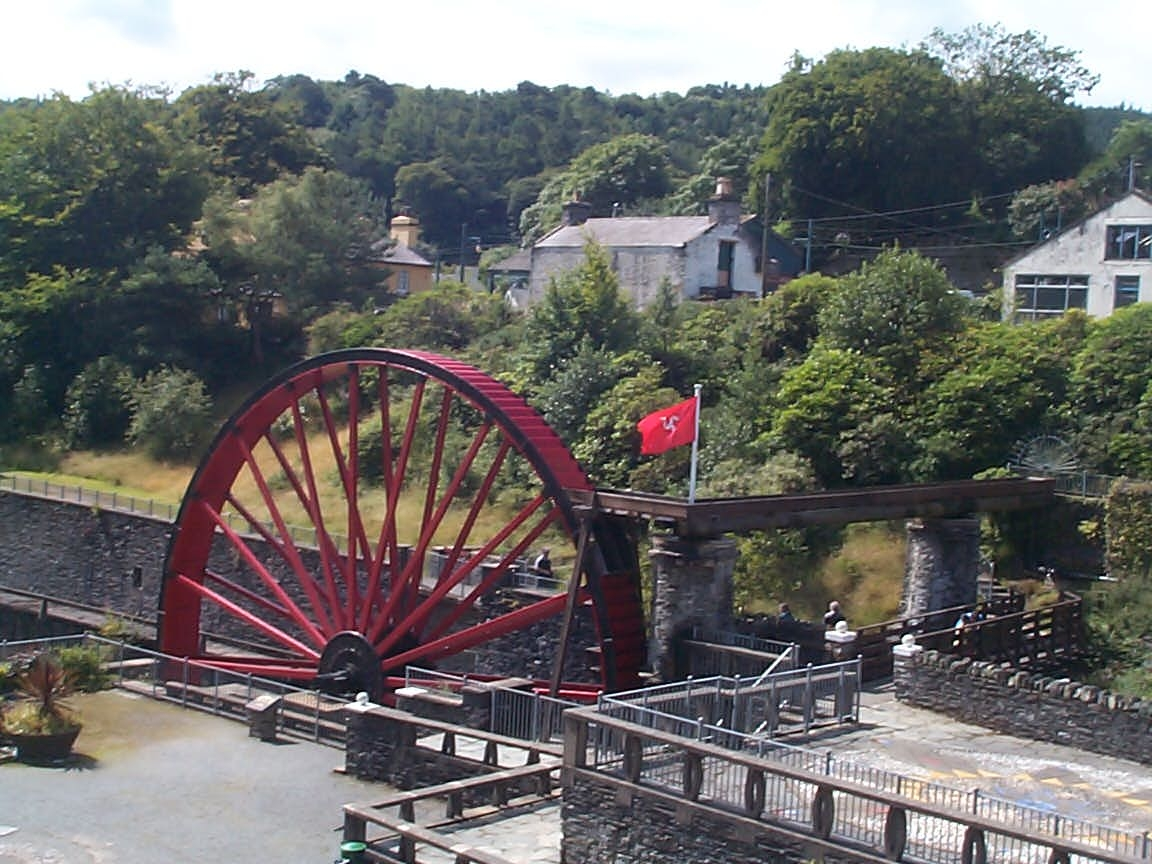
The Snaefell Wheel, Laxey. July 2009

The Snaefell Wheel (also known as Lady Evelyn) is a waterwheel in Laxey, Isle of Man. The wheel stands in the washing floors in Laxey Glen Gardens, approximately 700 metres south of the larger Laxey Wheel.

The wheel was unveiled with the name Lady Evelyn to mark the extensive work of Evelyn Jones in her support of the Laxey Mines Research Team.

== History ==
The wheel was purchased by the Snaefell Mining Company in 1865. Built by Messrs Leigh and Gilbert Howell of the Hawarden iron works in Flintshire, north Wales, it was one of two identical 50 ft (15.24 m) diameter wheels to be produced.

== Mine Disaster ==
In 1897 20 Miners died from Carbon Monoxide poisoning when they were in the mine.

By 1910, the wheel had come to the end of its working life at the Snaefell Mining Company and was disassembled to be sent to Bodmin, Cornwall. By the 1950s the wheel had fallen into disuse, and in 1971 the Cornish Wheel Preservation Society had acquired the wheel and dismantled it for preservation. The society later merged with the Trevithick Society, who are the current owners of the wheel.

In 1976, the Llywernog Silver Lead Mine in Wales took the wheel on loan from the society though never reconstructed it.

In 2003, an effort was started to restore the wheel to its home in Laxey and on 20 August 2006, the wheel had its official reopening ceremony and began turning for the first time in decades.

To mark the occasion of the official opening, and in similarity to its big sister, a piece of music "Snaefell Wheel March" was specially written by Paul Dunderdale for the occasion and performed for the first time by Onchan Silver Band at the opening ceremony, with suitable fanfare.

== See also ==
- Laxey Wheel
- Great Snaefell Mine
