= Laxey Mine =

Mine on the Isle of Man

The Great Laxey Mine
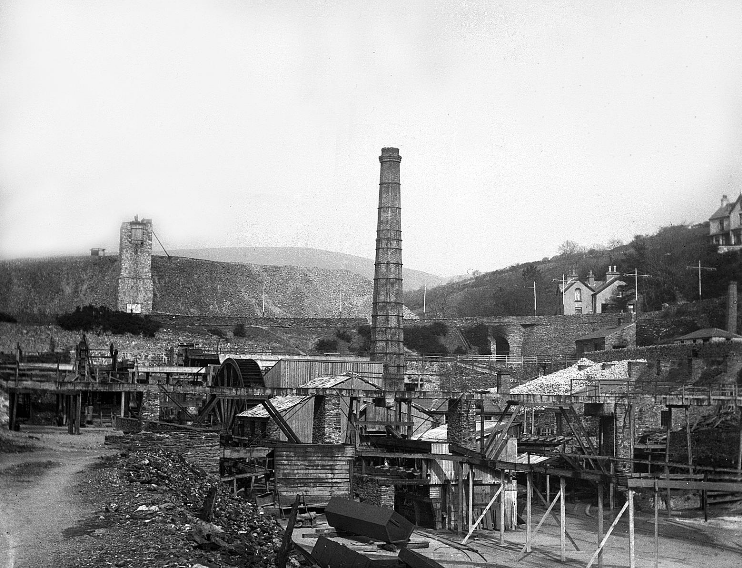
- The Washing Floor of the Great Laxey Mine

- Location in Isle of Man
- Location: Laxey, Isle of Man, Isle of Man, British Isles; 54°14′23.8″N 004°24′22.6″W
- Products: Zinc, lead, silver, copper
- Opened: c. 1782
- Closed: 1929
- Company: The Great Laxey Mining Company Limited
- Website: https://www.manxmines.com/LAXEY%20MINE.htm

The Great Laxey Mine was a silver, lead ore and zinc mine in Laxey, in the parish of Lonan, Isle of Man. The mine exceeded a depth of 2,200 ft (670 m) and consisted primarily of three shafts: the Welsh Shaft, the Dumbell's Shaft and the Engine Shaft; each of these shafts was connected by a series of levels.

The mine holds the world record for the largest sulphide crystal (measured by both volume and mass), being a sample of galena (PbS) weighing 118 kg. This sample is on permanent display in the geology galley of the Natural History Museum, London. The specimen is composite cubo-octahedra, measuring 25 x 25 x 25 cm.

== History ==
=== Origins ===
The Isle of Man contains a large variety of minerals. copper ore was mined at Bradda Head as far back as the 13th century, Harald, King of Mann (1237–1248) having granted a charter under which the monks of Furness Abbey obtained working rights for this mine.

Later in the same century the Earl of Buchan received a licence from King Edward I to dig for lead on the Calf of Man, and when the Isle of Man was granted to Sir John Stanley by King Henry IV in 1406, "mines of lead and iron" were included.

In 1700 almost 230 tons of copper ore was shipped from the Dhyrnane Mine at Maughold whilst also at this time the Rushen and Kirk Arbory mines were producing significant quantities of copper ore.

There is no exact date for the start of mining at Laxey. However, by 1782 workings were being opened, with the undertaking chiefly as an enterprise from Cumberland as opposed to the Isle of Man.

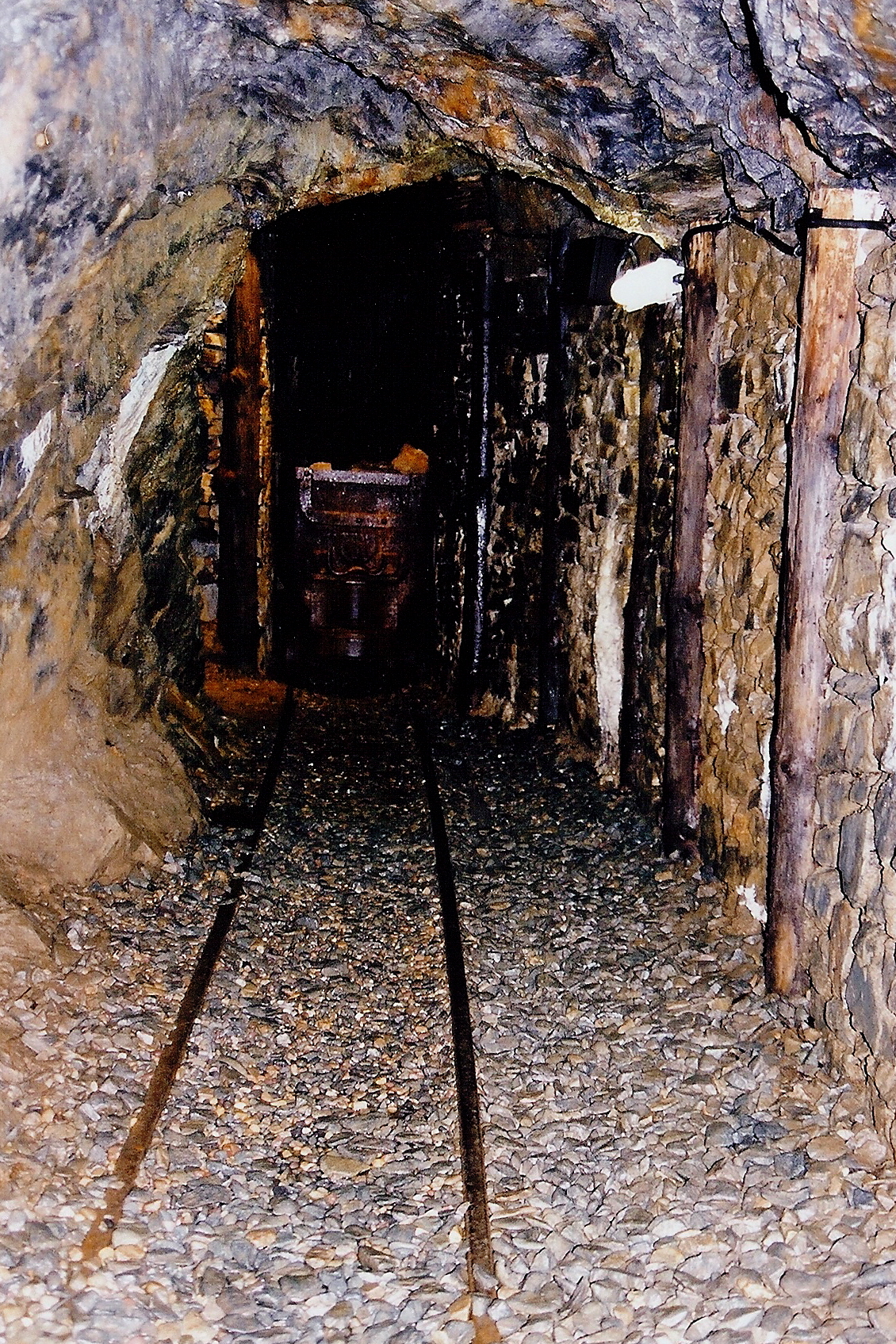
Inside the old adit of the Great Laxey Mine

=== 19th century ===
Laxey was primarily mined for its lead ore. However, in addition the mine yielded zinc, silver, copper pyrites and hematite iron in significant quantities. In 1819 both Laxey and Foxdale mines were closed, and within four years, both reopened. Laxey owed its fresh start to a Westmorland man who was in turn licensed for the undertaking by George Murray, 6th Duke of Atholl. Both mines soon boomed, triggering largely futile searches for metals in every part of the island.

From 1823 the mine was served by the Great Laxey Mine Railway.

By 1833 over 200 men were employed in the mine. Whilst various minerals were extracted from the mine, lead ore was the main component of the workings, and substances regarded as of lesser value were simply thrown away.

The mine was rich in silver ore yielding 180 ounces (5.5 kg) to the ton. This saw a dramatic increase in the price of the mine company shares: shares trading for £34 in the late 1820s were trading for between £1,500 and £2,000 by 1833. In late 1833 the mine sustained significant damage when the river overflowed its banks and flooded the shaft, and the mine was not operational again until the end of February 1834.

In part payment for their labour, the owners allowed the miners to keep the copper ore which had been extracted, and by the mid 19th century this was being sold for £23 14s 6d per ton. A mixture of copper and lead was sold for £7 per ton, and this would be used to glaze lower end earthenware.

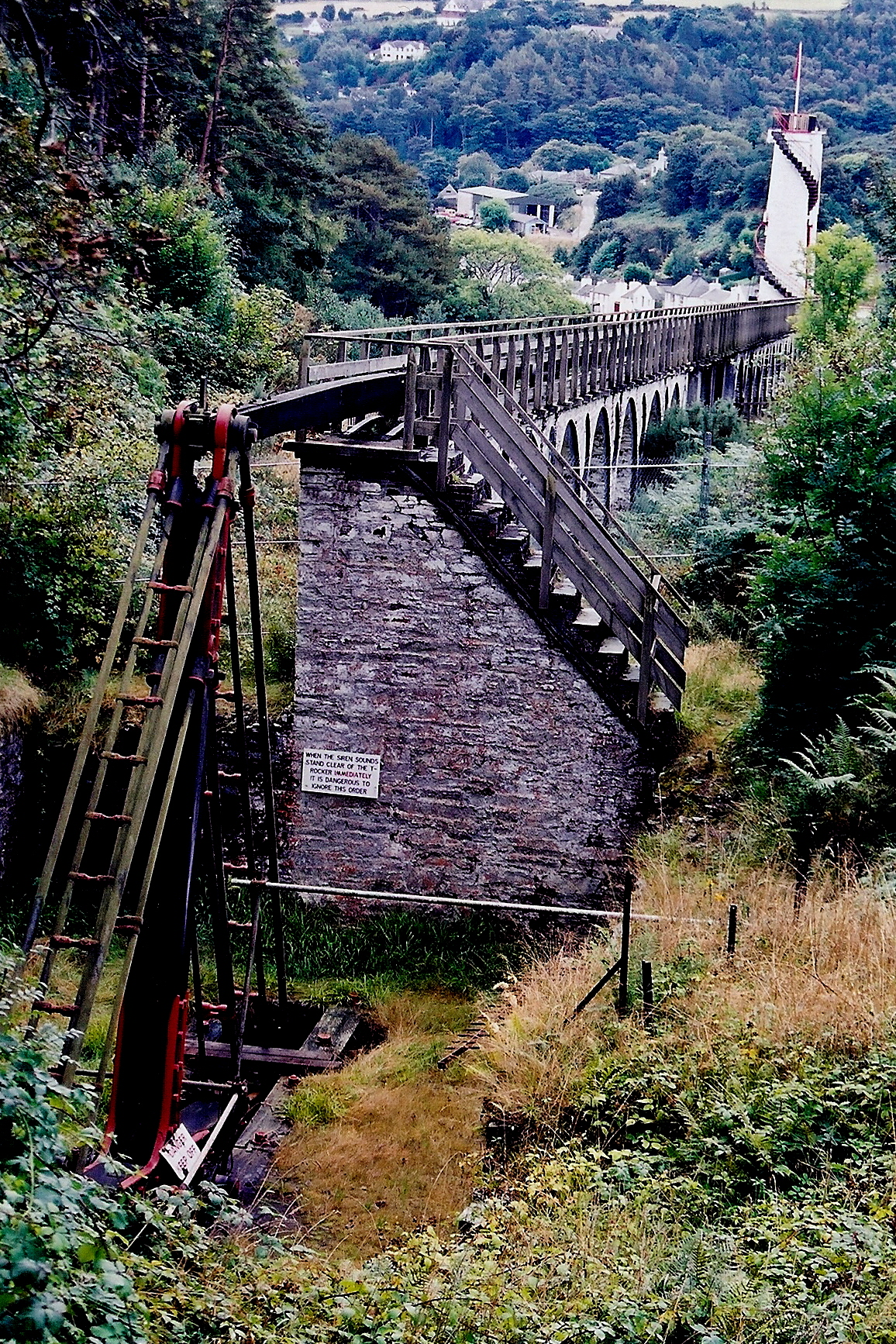
The inverted 'T' rocker, part of the pumping apparatus which pumped the water from the Laxey Mine, powered by the Laxey Wheel

=== Laxey Wheel ===
During the height of prosperity of the Great Laxey Mine, the Laxey Wheel was erected. The wheel was named the Lady Isabella, after the wife of Sir Charles Hope, who at the time was the Lieutenant Governor of the Isle of Man. During its working life the wheel was capable of pumping 250 gallons (1100 litres) of water a minute from a depth of 200 fathoms (370 metres).

=== 20th century ===
By the beginning of the 20th century the yield from the mine had begun to decline dramatically. During the first six months of 1900 only 100 tons of lead was sold, fetching £1,500. The amount of blende stood at 650 tons, generating £4,150; however this compared to 857 tons generating £7,152 for the corresponding period of the previous year. The fall in price of lead from the previous year was £1 19s 6d per ton.

In 1901 a rich vein of lead was discovered; however during the extraction the workings let loose a large body of water. Further, there was a shortage of the water needed to power the Laxey Wheel, so that it could not combat the flooding. Thus the water rose in the mine, gradually overwhelming the pumps, until the workings had filled to a depth of 1,000 ft (300 m). Electric pumps were proposed to remedy the situation, but it was found impracticable to get electrically operated pumps of the required capacity down the shafts. By January 1902, although the main ingress had ended, the water level in the mine was still rising by 6 inches (15 cm) daily. By March 1902 some workers were being paid off, although the washing floors kept working and some men were still employed underground. Due to the depressed market, combined with the cost of keeping the mine free of water, the mine was becoming uneconomic. A scheme which drew the attention of the company directors was to acquire the North Laxey & Glencherry mine, at that time also flooded, and work the two mines in unison. This idea had the approval of the Government's Inspector on Mines, Foster Brown. Half the mine remained flooded, and it was that half which yielded the richer output. It was still uncertain whether the flooded part of the mine could be drained economically, and if it could, would it then be able to be worked without further encroachment. A report by the mining manager at the end of March stated that all workings by then were flooded to the 85 fathom (155 metre) level.

A Directors Report in 1902 stated that until then the company had spent £1.75 million in developing the mine, a total of £535,625 had been paid to shareholders in dividends and a further £138,064 had been paid in royalties to the Crown.

=== Clearing the mine ===
The problems draining the mine continued into 1903. A major difficulty was how to position pumps in the correct areas. The shafts were only about 4 ft × 4 ft in places; they were also crooked, being generally at an angle of 15 degrees from the vertical, and at a total depth of approximately 1,000 ft (300 m) from the surface. Eventually it was decided to use steam pumps, and an order was placed with Joseph Evans & Sons of Wolverhampton. A large pump with a capacity of 400 gallons per minute was fixed on a sliding cradle and lowered, together with its steam and water mains, on link chains so as to follow the water down as the level subsided. At intervals down the shaft there were fixed pumps placed at various levels so as to limit the suspended pump to a lift of no greater than 360 ft (110 m) at any given time. In addition a fixed electrically powered pump was installed at the 255 fathom level which was capable of forcing the water up to the adit in one lift.

Joseph Evans & Sons provided all the appliances needed, including all the steam pumping mains, chains, lifting apparatus, steam capstan engines and three Lancashire boilers accompanied by a 100 ft (30 m) stack. To accommodate the machinery new footings for the boilers (the largest on the Isle of Man) had to be constructed, with the machinery being hauled from Douglas to Laxey by a special traction engine which had been brought over for the purpose.

The operation was slow, but by December 1903 the water level had gone down by about 100 ft (30 m) per month, resulting in the 120 fathom level being reached by 17 December. The main problem in purging the shaft was that the pumping machinery had to be specifically designed and constructed because of the mine shaft being so narrow and irregular. By February 1904 the mine had been cleared to 844 ft (257 m) below the adit level. When the water was reduced below the 145 fathom level a further pump was installed which aided the operation and as the different levels were cleared, miners were able to work them.

== Incidents ==
=== 19 March 1904 ===
On Saturday 19 March 1904, a fire broke out in the Welsh Shaft at a position ten fathoms below the surface. The incident was of particular significance as a similar outbreak of fire in the Great Snaefell Mine in 1897 resulted in the deaths of 19 miners.

Prior to the main shift commencing work, a party of men had descended the Welsh Shaft to inspect the joints of the steam pumps which had been put into the mine to assist in purging water, and which were found to be satisfactory. Following this over 100 men entered the mine to begin work. At approximately 07:00hrs the boiler man at the Welsh Shaft picked up the smell of burning wood and promptly raised the alarm. Arranged signals were then used to alert those in the mine to evacuate, and in less than 30 minutes all the men were accounted for.

The position of the fire was traced to a point 33 fathoms down, a hose was brought and water pumped down to the level. Several men volunteered to descend to the level, where they found hot pieces of rock falling from the roof of the shaft. To avert the risk of a possible heavy rock fall from the vicinity of the shaft choking up the shaft below the adit, heavy timber was placed across the pit, and deflected a further fall as a result of the fire.

Water continued to be poured down the mouth of the shaft, being effective in putting out the fire, enabling men to directly extinguish the smoldering timbers and make secure the sides of the shaft.

As opposed to the Snaefell Mine, the three shafts of the Laxey Mine and the various connecting levels had excellent ventilation, and this would have aided in some way to the fire claiming no casualties.

=== 10 December 1904 ===
Another incident occurred on Saturday 10 December 1904, resulting in the deaths of 4 miners. The shift began work at 06:00hrs, with the shift due to end at 14:00hrs, the alarm being raised when 4 men failed to return to the surface. It was understood that the men in question had been working at the 190 fathom level and when it was certain they had failed to return a search party was organised with the search commencing at 15:00hrs. On reaching the 190 fathom level, approximately midway between the Engine Shaft and the Welsh Shaft, the search party saw collapsed timbers which had been used as a scaffold around what had been a covered sump (a hole made in the floor of a level in the direction of a lower level, being used for ventilation) the depth of which was approximately 27 ft (8.2 m). In this case however, the sump did not go through to the lower level, but was filled with water to approximately 10 ft (3.0 m) of the covering. To the search party it was obvious that the scaffold had collapsed resulting in the men falling into the sump which contained approximately 17 ft (5.2 m) of water. Grappling hooks together with blocks and tackle were requested and at 19:00hrs the first body of a miner was recovered. Two further bodies were recovered at 21:00hrs and at 23:00hrs leaving one miner unaccounted for. The efforts to locate the body of the missing miner continued through the night, but by 04:00hrs the following morning the body had still to be located and this continued throughout Sunday 11 December, and it was not until 01:00hrs on the morning of Monday when the body was recovered.

The 190 fathom level had been used as a footway up until the flooding of the mine in 1901, and the object of sending the men to repair it was to use it in the same way. The level had been underwater for several years as a result of the flooding, and the men had been detailed to clear away debris, examine the level and prepare it for carrying out further repairs. There was speculation that the men had been testing the covering of the sump when it collapsed. It was determined that the accident occurred shortly after 11:30hrs, this been ascertained by the fact that a watch on one of the miners had stopped at that time and a watch on another miner a few minutes later. There was no evidence of a rock fall in the vicinity ruling out that as a contributory factor.

An Inquest into the deaths of the miners opened on Tuesday 13 December, presided over by the High Bailiff of Castletown, James Gell, who was deputising for Samuel Harris.

The funerals of the victims also took place on Tuesday 13 December, at Lonan Churchyard, with the service by John Quine, Vicar of Lonan. The Great Laxey Mining Company were represented by the chairman, the Mine Manager and the Mine Secretary. In addition children from Minorca Sunday School, of which John Gawne was a member and the Laxey Brass Band, of which John Quayle was a member, were also in attendance.

List of those killed
Name	Age
Henry Lewis Gelling	18
John Thomas Quayle	40
John Thomas Gawne	41
Robert Wade	26

== Closure ==
Following various short-term closures, by May 1929 rumours had begun to circulate about the future of the mine. By then, most of those who had worked the mine had left; many miners emigrated to South Africa, Australia or the USA. Continued flooding in the lower reaches of the mine combined with antiquated pumping machinery finally signified the end of mining operations at Laxey, and on the whole island. However some of the spoil residue was brought to the washing floors to extract any remaining worth from it. It is thought that this continued until 1934, when all working finally ceased.

During the late 1930s, spoil from the workings at the mines at both Foxdale and Laxey was transported to the north of the island, where it was used to level the land during the construction of RAF Jurby and RAF Andreas.

Specimens of metals mined at Laxey and at Foxdale are on display in the Manx Museum. Laxey yielded a higher standard of ore than Foxdale, this being evident in the appearance of the respective specimens and bearing testimony to Laxey being considered as one of the richest ore mines in the British Isles.

Visitors to Laxey Wheel today can view displays about the mine and can venture a short distance into the adit.

== Bibliography ==
- Manx Mines, Rocks, and Minerals. Published by the Manx Heritage Foundation in co-operation with Manx National Heritage. 1994
- Bawden T.A., Garrad L.S., Qualtrough J.W., and Scatchard W.R. The Industrial Archaeology of the Isle of Man. Published by David & Charles, 1972. (out of print)
- Industrial Archaeology of the Isle of Man – an Introduction. Produced by Manx National Heritage, 1993. Published by the Manx Experience.
- Lady Isabella and the Great Laxey Mine – Official Guide. Jointly published by the Manx Experience and The Manx Museum and National Trust.
