= Great Laxey Mine Railway =

Narrow gauge heritage railway in the Isle of Man

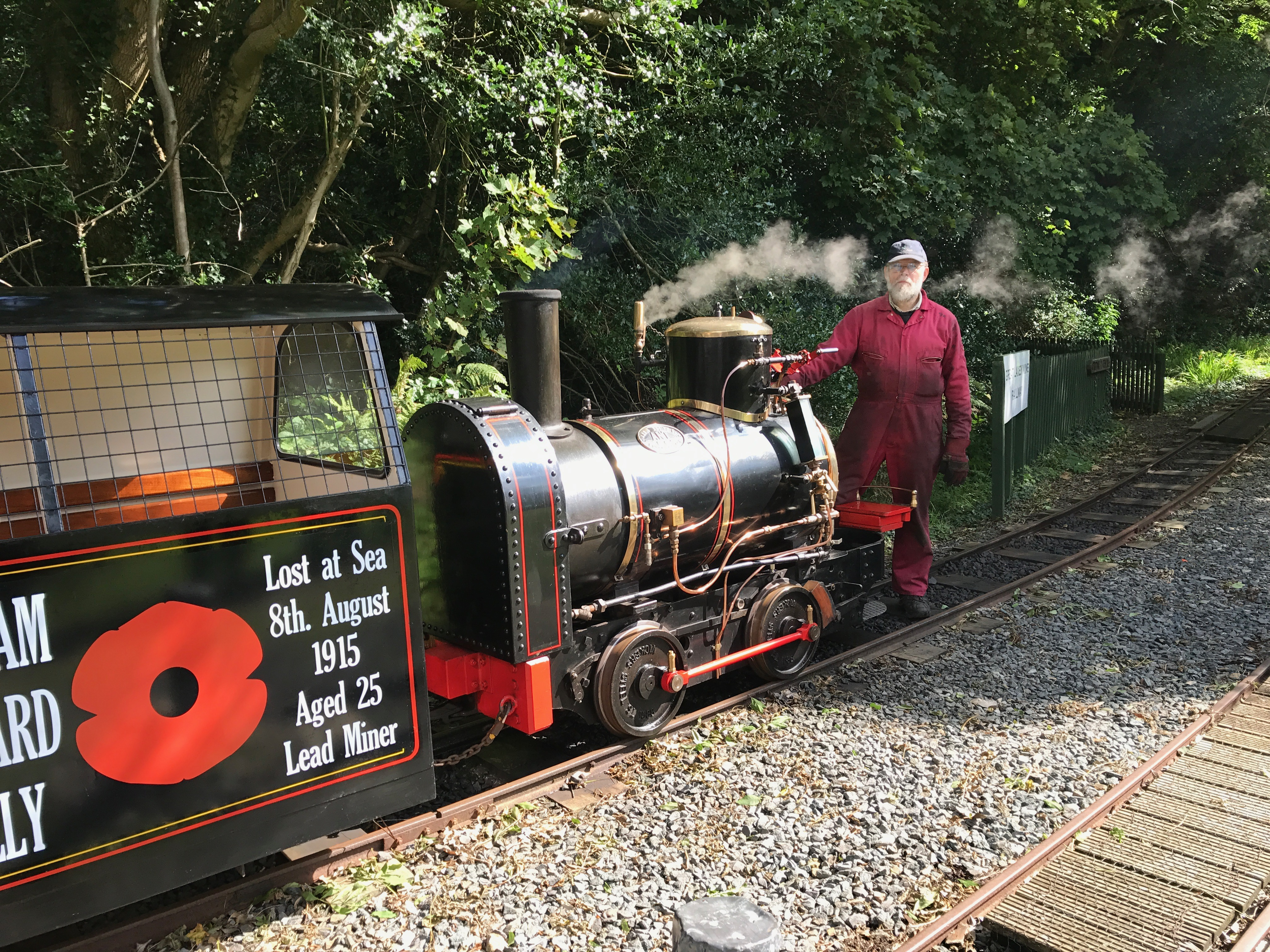
- A passenger train about to depart from Mines Yard station.

Overview
- Headquarters: Laxey
- Locale: Isle of Man
- Dates of operation: 1870s-1929, 2004–present

Technical
- Track gauge: 19 in (483 mm)
- Length: 1/4 mi (0.4 km)

The Great Laxey Mine Railway was originally constructed to serve the Isle of Man's Great Laxey Mine, a lead mine located in Laxey. The 19 in (483 mm) gauge railway runs from the old mine entrance to the washing floors along a right of way that passes through the Isle of Man's only remaining railway tunnel (another at Dhoon West Quarry is disused) under the 3 ft (914 mm) gauge Victorian Manx Electric Railway and the main A2 Douglas to Ramsey coast road.

== History ==
The Great Laxey Mine was an extensive system of mine shafts and tunnels, which descended to a depth of 2,200 feet underground. The uppermost level of mine workings, known as the adit, was a series of tunnels extending to a mile and a half, which entered the hillside at ground level, and connected the heads of all the working mine shafts. Within this adit level a railway was provided from 1823, to allow transportation of mined ores from the mine shafts out to the external washing floors and mine yards.

The railway was originally hand-operated, with miners pushing small wagons. In 1827 a pit pony was purchased to haul the wagons, and the number of ponies grew as the mines expanded. By the 1870s there was a clear need for more modern motive power, and the two steam locomotives Ant and Bee were delivered in 1877.

The mine closed in 1929. The railway remained in place for the following six years, but in 1935 all parts of the railway above ground, including the locomotives and rolling stock, were scrapped.

In the 1970s the adit level was reopened and explored for historical evidence. It was discovered that parts of the underground section of the railway were still intact, and in one tunnel an entire train (consisting of six open ore wagons) was found, abandoned underground when work in the mine had finished. The wagons were returned to ground level and restored.

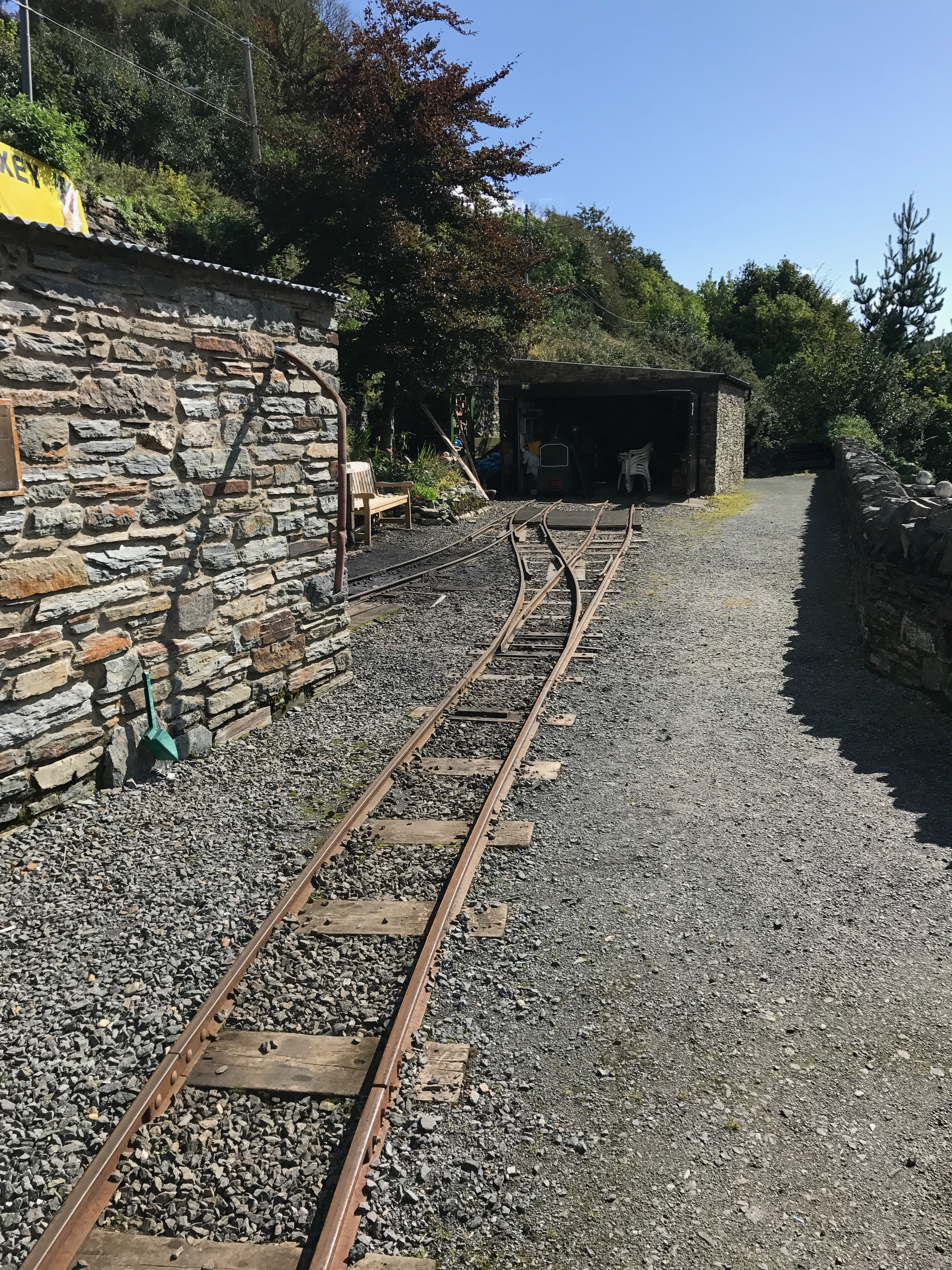
The engine and carriage sheds at Valley Gardens. Locomotive Wasp is visible, undergoing maintenance.

In the late 1990s momentum began to grow for the restoration of the railway's above-ground section, and in 2000 restoration work commenced. The restored railway was re-opened in 2004.

== Restored route ==
The volunteers originally restored the railway's works and locomotive shed (rebuilding the shed on the exact footprint of the original). Clearance of blockages and damages in the tunnel enabled the original route to be relaid to a point close to the mine entrance in time for the 2004 re-opening. By 2005 the line had been relaid into the old mine yard. Although the line runs past the mine entrance, the spur into the underground section has not been restored.

Trains on the restored line originally departed from the engine sheds, but in 2006 the original station site at the Valley Gardens was cleared, and the two-platform station was restored, with the track relaid on the original formation, including one of the tightest radius bends on a working heritage railway line in the British Isles. By 2006 a majority of the above-ground section of the original railway had been restored, including a running line extending to 1/4 mi (0.4 km) in length.

== Stations ==
Point	Coordinates (Links to map resources)	OS Grid Ref	Notes
Valley Gardens	54.2338°N 4.4053°W	SC43328468	
Mines Yard	54.2362°N 4.4068°W	SC43238495	

Passengers travel from Valley Gardens station to Mines Yard station, near the entrance to the mines. A regular shuttle service runs on operating days. Both stations have two platforms, permitting the operation of more than one train at busy times. There are no intermediate stations or loops. There is one spur, on the washing floors site, leading to the engine and carriage sheds.

== Locomotives ==
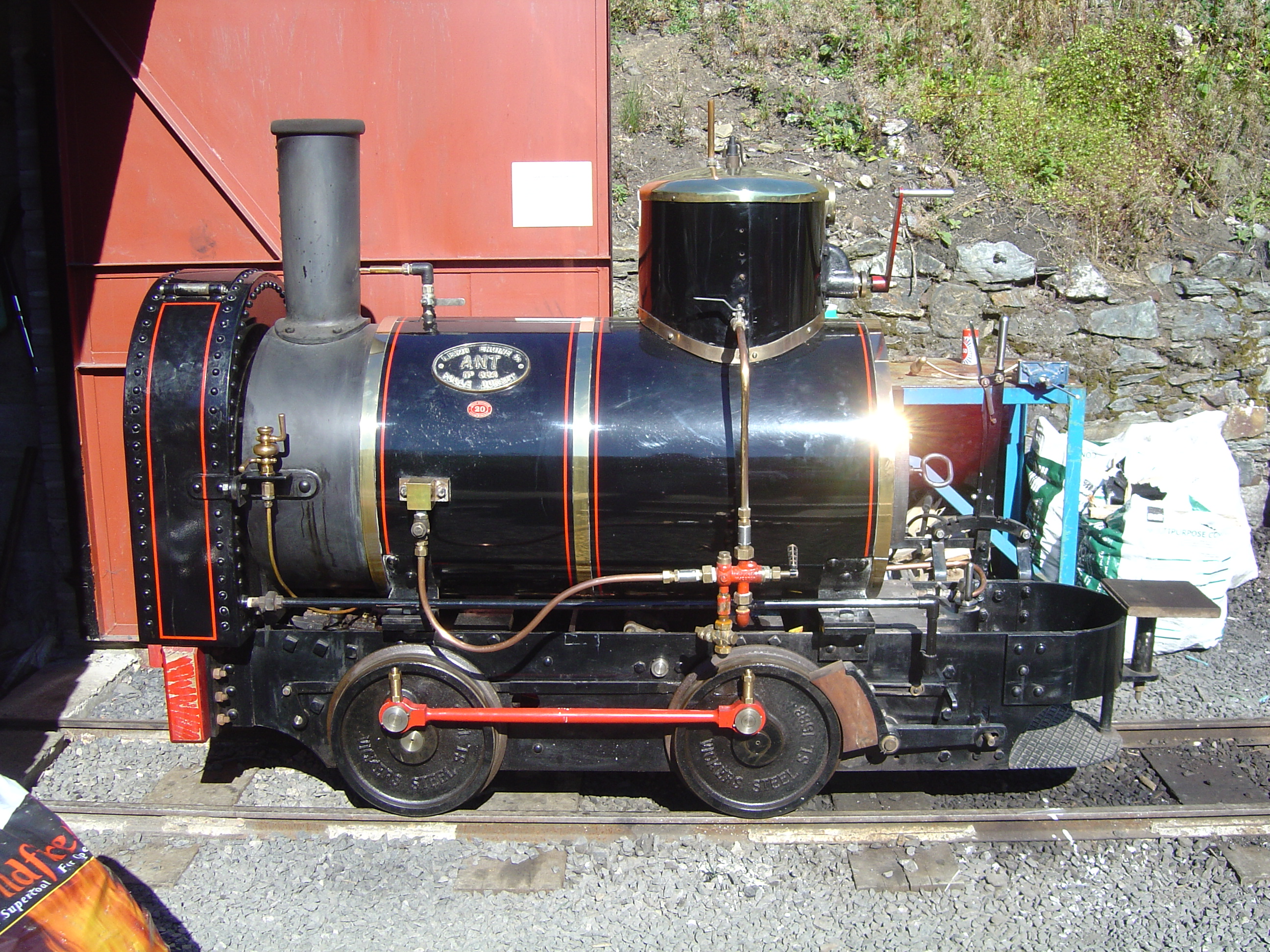
Ant outside the shed in 2005

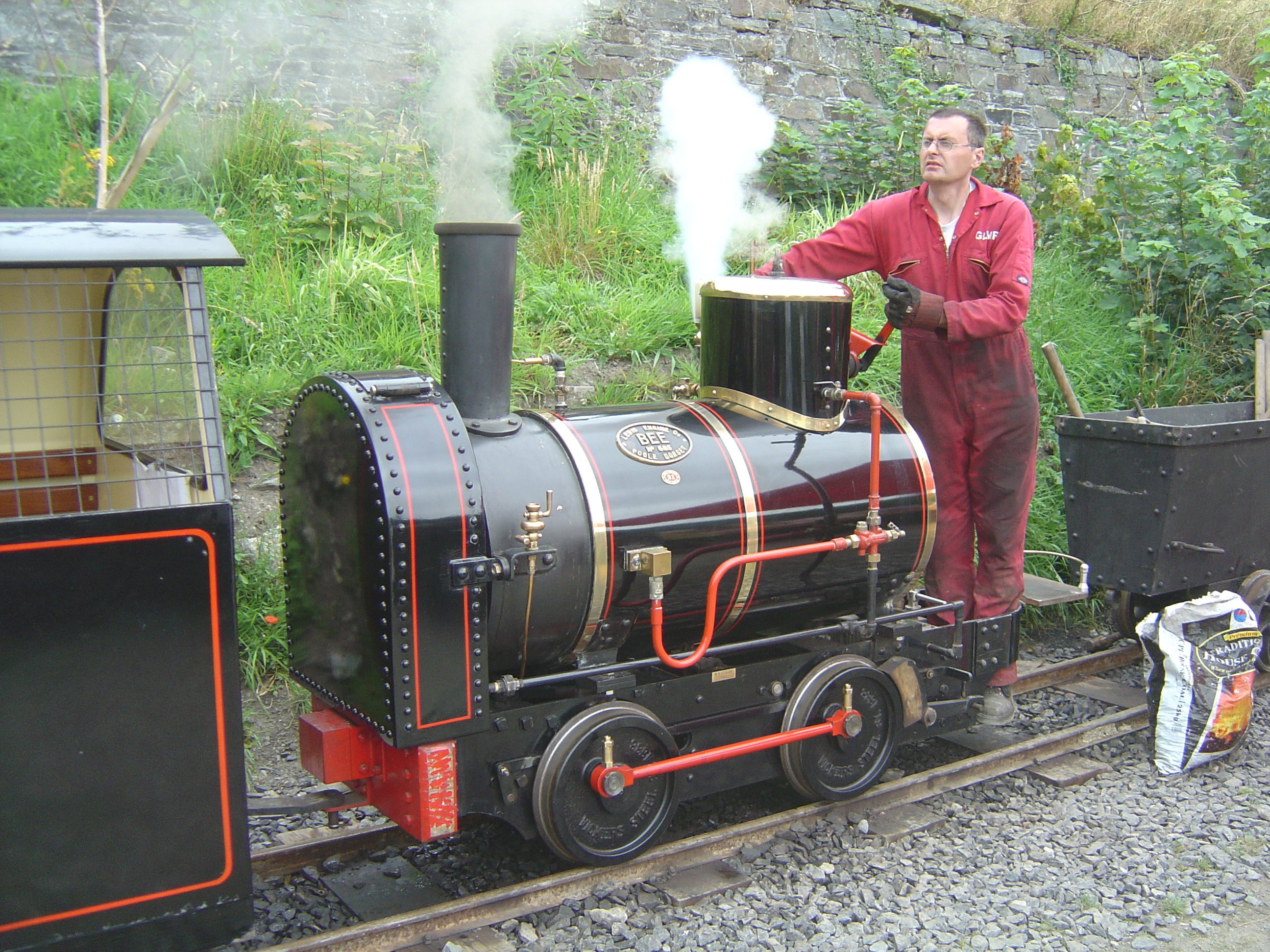
Bee with a train in 2005

Following the periods of hand operation and then pony haulage, a pair of steam locomotives were delivered from Stephen Lewin of Poole in 1877. Ant and Bee were 0-4-0 tank locomotives made unusually narrow, in order to fit within the adit. They were 4 ft 9 in (1.45 m) high and only 3 ft (0.91 m) wide. Their two 4 in × 6 in (102 mm × 152 mm) inside cylinders had Bagnall-Price valve gear and a geared drive to the rear axle, but coupling rods between the axles. The arrangement of the water tanks was particularly unusual, being a front tank ahead of the smokebox, in order to reduce width. They had launch-type boilers, as were commonly used for small locomotives with insufficient space between the frames for a conventional firebox.

Around 1905, a replacement locomotive was considered and W. G. Bagnall were asked for a design. This was similar to the Lewins design, but more conventional. A saddle tank was used and conventional cylinders with connecting rods to the axle. The power cylinders were however mounted inside the frames and the Bagnall-Price valvgear and slide valves mounted outside. This new locomotive was never constructed, although Bagnalls did instead build two new boilers for the existing locomotives. Both survived the closure of the mine but were scrapped in 1935, six years afterwards.

Replicas of both locomotives were constructed for the re-opening of the line as a tourist attraction. They now operate the line, together with a battery electric locomotive named Wasp, which previously worked in a mine in Cornwall.

=== Table of locomotives ===
Name	Wheel arrangement	Builder's number	Year built & builder	Year rebuilt & builder	Notes
Ant	0-4-0	684	1877; Stephen Lewin	1905; W. G. Bagnall	Scrapped in 1935.
Bee	0-4-0	685	1877; Stephen Lewin	1905; W. G. Bagnall	Scrapped in 1935.
Ant	0-4-0	20	2004; Great Northern Steam	2007; Alan Keef	Replica engine. Re-boilered 2011. In service.
Bee	0-4-0	21	2004; Great Northern Steam	2009; GLMR	Replica engine. Re-boilered 2011. In service.
Wasp	4WBL	B0152	1973; Clayton Equipment Company	2009; Alan Keef	Battery electric industrial tunnel engine moved to GLMR in 2009. In service.

== Rolling stock ==
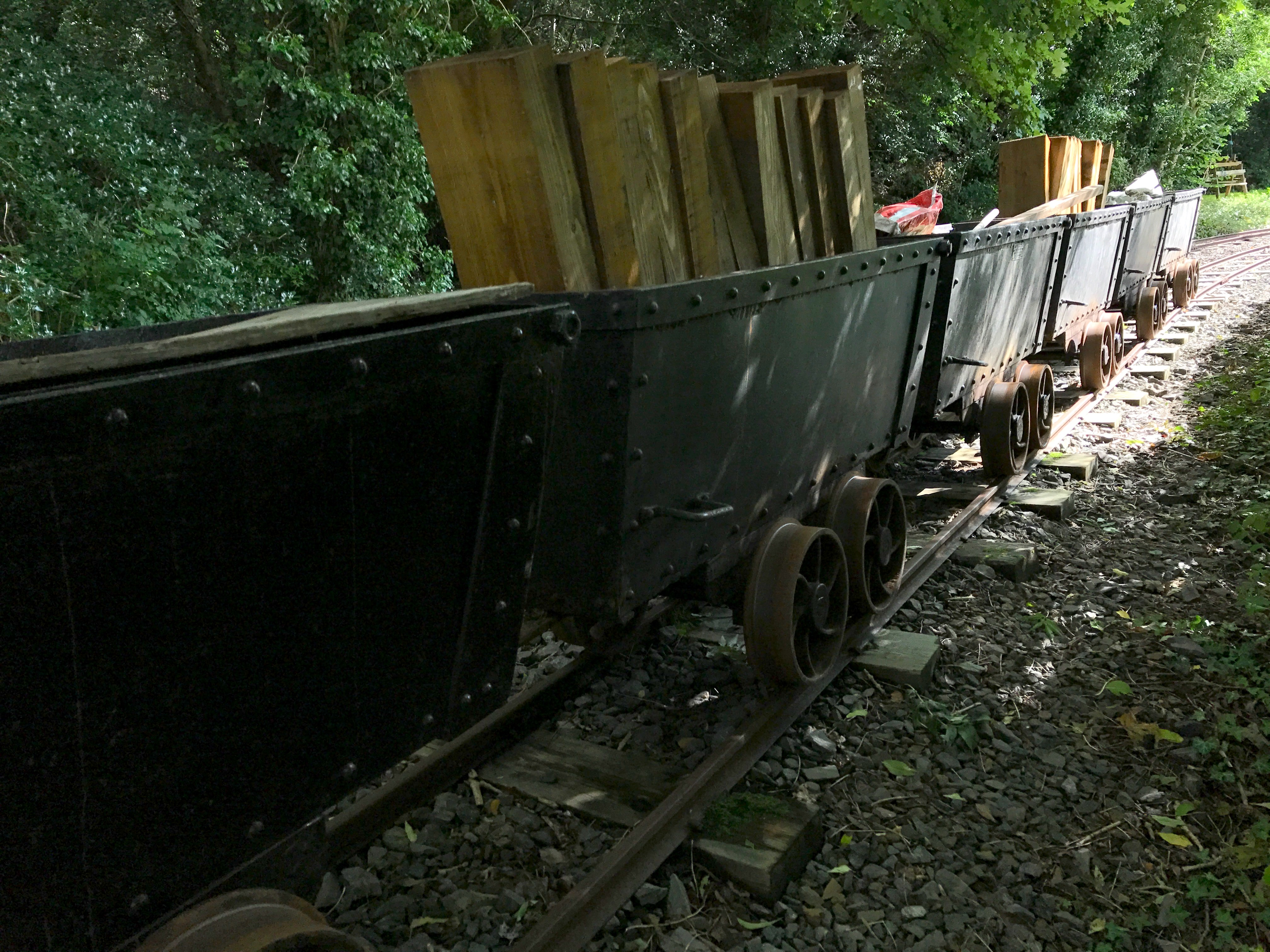
Replica lead ore wagons at Mines Yard station.

The railway operates two passenger carriages. Owing to the narrow gauge and low clearances the bogie carriages are long and narrow, with passengers sitting on longitudinal transverse benches, and effectively travelling sideways when the train is in motion.

- Carriage 1, built by Alan Keef Ltd in 2004.
- Carriage 2, built by Alan Keef Ltd in 2007.

The railway's freight wagons were originally constructed locally, and took the form of high-sided four-wheeled open ore wagons. A full train of these wagons was discovered underground in the mid-1970s.

- Six original ore wagons, now preserved in museum locations on the island.
- Six replica ore wagons, built at the Laxey Blacksmith in 2000, in regular service on the restored railway.
- 4-wheel tipping ore truck (not serviceable), static exhibit at Valley Gardens station.

Additionally, some rail vehicles are available for use by volunteer permanent way engineers on the railway, for construction and maintenance duties.

- 4-wheel tipping wagon, convertible to flatbed format, unofficially named Freddy (acquired second-hand in 2010).
- 4-wheel light maintenance trolley, unofficially named Jimmy, built in 2006.
- Single-wheel rail barrow - a single flanged wheel allows the barrow to be hand-operated along one rail of the running line. Liveried in engineering black and yellow wasp stripes.

== Laxey Browside Tramway ==
At the upper terminus, linking the railway to the Laxey Wheel, once operated the Laxey Browside Tramway but this has long since vanished, replaced with a car park.

== See also ==
- British narrow gauge railways
- Laxey Wheel
