= Victoria Clock Tower, Isle of Man =

Victoria Clock Tower
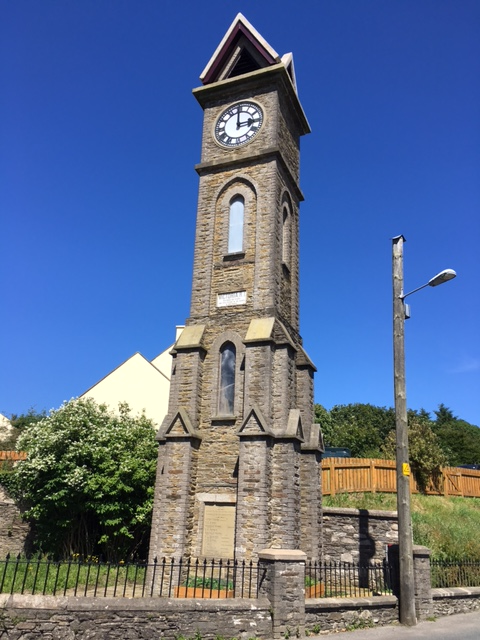
- Victoria Clock Tower, Mines Rd, Foxdale, Isle of Man
- Interactive map of Victoria Clock Tower
- Coordinates: 54.1693°N 4.6394°W
- Designer: John Nicholls
- Type: Monument
- Material: Stone, concrete and ironwork
- Height: 40 ft (12.2 m)
- Opening date: 1901
- Dedicated to: "Victoria, RI. (Reigned 64 years. And still reigns in the hearts of her people)"

The Victoria Clock Tower, also referred to as the Queen Victoria Memorial, is a heritage-registered clock tower located in the former mining village of Foxdale, Isle of Man, and is said to have been the first memorial in the British Empire dedicated to the 64-year reign of Queen Victoria.

The tower was commissioned and paid for by the Isle of Man Mining Company and stands at the southern end of what was once the Miner's Institute, Foxdale village, facing the mine company's offices. Donated as a gift from the company to the people of Foxdale, when completed in 1901 it was situated in a specially advantageous position, having been so arranged that the clock could be seen from all points of the village in order to provide a much needed standard of time to the inhabitants.

== Design and construction ==
Constructed in a Gothic style, the tower stands at 40 ft (12.2 m) and was designed by John Nicholls, engineer of the mine, with the stonework being undertaken by masons and labourers employed by the works. Built with local stone and with corner pieces and decorative features of concrete, it has at its base eight supporting buttresses.

The clock was supplied by J.B. Joyce & Co., of Whitchurch, Shropshire. The clock consists of two faces, one which would have faced the mine works and the other which at one time would have faced Pott's Shaft. The faces are 5 ft (1.5 m) in diameter consisting of ironwork filled with opal and are visible across the valley. Initially it was intended to have the faces illuminated at night, however this never occurred.

== Dedication ceremony ==
The dedication ceremony of the monument took place on Thursday 16 May 1901 and was an occasion of immense civic pride for the village of Foxdale. The ceremony was performed by James Mackee, Chairman of the Isle of Man Mining Company, accompanied by Captain William Kitto with numerous other dignitaries and the Foxdale Mines Band. Upon the clock striking six o'clock, Mr Mackee pulled the cord releasing the cover over the marble tablet, the inscription on which read:

"Victoria. R.I.
Reigned 64 years.
And still reigns in the hearts of her people."

Following the dedication the band struck up the British National Anthem and Mr Mackee called for "Three Cheers for The King."

== Subsequent life ==
In 1912 following the winding up of the Isle of Man Mining Company, a liquidation sale of its assets which included the Victoria Clock Tower was held. Despite having previously been donated to the people of Foxdale, the mine company had undertaken to keep the structure in a good state of repair as well as providing the finances for its upkeep. The structure, along with the institute, were purchased by a Mr. Kerruish who again donated the clock tower as well as the nearby institute to the village of Foxdale. By 1939 the clock had succumbed to a state of disrepair and a committee was formed with a view to raising money in order to carry out repairs. A sum of £50 was raised, which included a donation of $5 from a Foxdalian who had emigrated to Kirkland Lake, Ontario. The money was used to carry out repairs to the clock, which were undertaken by a company from Leeds and in addition a tablet, consisting of the names of the directors of the Isle of Man Mining Company as of 1901, and which had been languishing in the cellar of the old mine's pay office since its closure, was placed within the lower part of the tower. The ceremony of the restarting of the clock, together with the unveiling of the tablet, was carried out 1 July 1939.

The clock tower became the property of a trust until 1962 when it was acquired by the Isle of Man's Department of Social Services following the winding up of the trust, in turn becoming the responsibility of the Department of Local Government and Environment and the Department of Infrastructure. In 2018 the clock underwent further restoration following which ownership of the clock tower was transferred to the local authority, Patrick Commissioners. Today the clock tower remains a focal part of the village of Foxdale together with the adjacent community garden.

== Gallery ==
Victoria Clock Tower
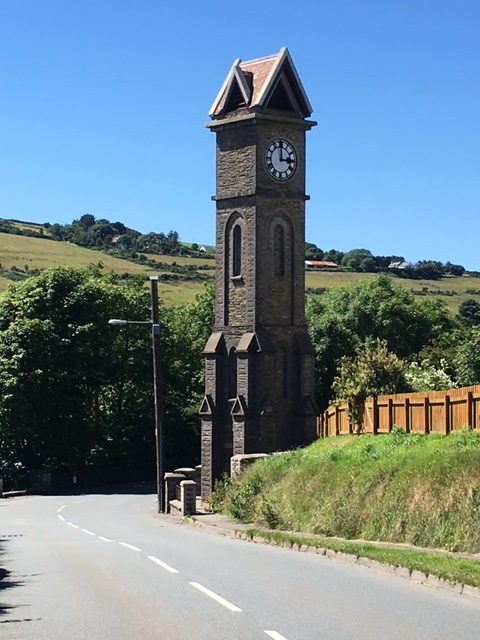
Queen Victoria Memorial, Foxdale

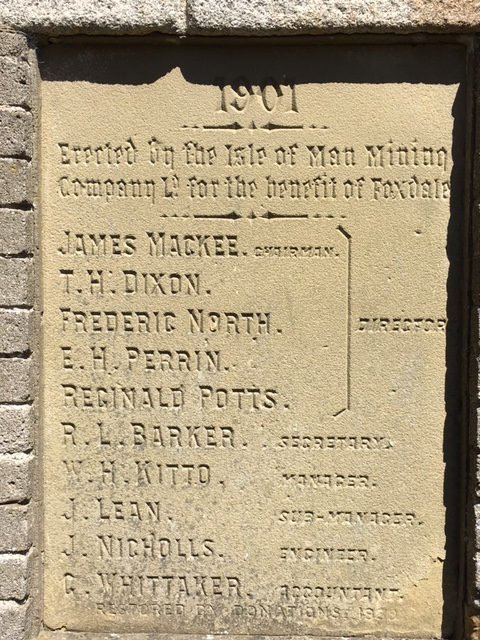
This tablet, bearing the names of the directors of the Isle of Man Mining Company, was inserted into the lower part of the tower in 1939.

== See also ==
- Foxdale Mines
- Isle of Man
- Foxdale
- Isle of Man Mining Company
- Foxdale Railway
