= Dalrymple Maitland =

Manx politician

Dalrymple Maitland

Dalrymple Maitland, JP (22 March 1848 – 25 March 1919) was an Isle of Man business leader and public official who served as a member of the House of Keys starting in 1890, and as Speaker of the House of Keys from 1909 to 1919.

A native of Liverpool, Maitland was the son of John Maitland, editor of the Liverpool Mercury. He was educated at Dr Steele's Crescent Academy and afterwards worked in his uncle's business, to the management of which he succeeded when his uncle decided to give more time to public affairs. He also inherited the proprietorship of the Liverpool Mercury, but in 1887, when he followed his uncle into public life, he sold the Mills and other businesses.

After 1887, he was associated with many public and commercial offices taking over most from his uncle on the latter's death in 1890. He was elected a Member of the House of Keys for Middle in 1890 and became Speaker of the House of Keys in 1909, holding this position until retirement in 1919, his final year.

He had become a Justice of the Peace in 1892 and Captain of the Parish of Marown in 1909. He was also the Chairman of Isle of Man Railways, the Isle of Man Steam Packet Company and the Isle of Man Bank.

Three days after his seventy-first birthday, Maitland died of acute bronchitis at his home in the village of Union Mills. The burial, on 28 March 1919, was at Braddan. His wife, Frances Caley, whom he married on 16 June 1879, died in 1891, a short time after giving birth to their only child, John Dalrymple Maitland, who died on the battlefield in Flanders during the First World War on 21 February 1916.

The Isle of Man Railway locomotive No. 11 built in 1905 was named in his honour.
