= Foxdale =

Human settlement in the Isle of Man

Coordinates: 54.1693°N 4.6394°W

Foxdale: Manx: Forsdal
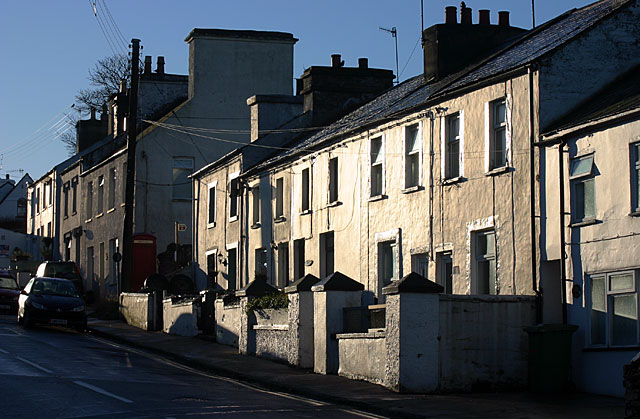
- Houses in Higher Foxdale

- Location within the Isle of Man
- OS grid reference: SC278780
- Parish: Patrick
- Sheading: Glenfaba
- Crown dependency: Isle of Man
- Post town: ISLE OF MAN
- Postcode district: IM4
- Dialling code: 01624
- Police: Isle of Man
- Fire: Isle of Man
- Ambulance: Isle of Man
- House of Keys: Glenfaba

Foxdale (/ˈfɒksdeɪl/; Manx: Forsdal [ˈfɑːstθəl]; Old Norse: Fors-dal – 'waterfall dale or valley'), also called Balley'n Eas (meaning "waterfall-town in Manx"), is a village consisting of the districts of Upper and Lower Foxdale on the A3 Castletown to Ramsey Road with the junction of the A24 Foxdale to Braaid road and the A40 The Hope road in the parish of Kirk Patrick in the Isle of Man.

The village of Foxdale falls within the sheading of Glenfaba. Politically it is part of the constituency of Glenfaba & Peel and is currently represented in Tynwald and the House of Keys by Ray Harmer MHK and Geoffrey Boot MHK. The village is served by Patrick Parish Commissioners. The village has a heritage centre which is run voluntarily. It was formerly the terminus of the Foxdale Railway.

== Foxdale mines ==
In the 19th century there were 13 mines and workings in the area of Foxdale, which included five mines working the Foxdale shear. The mines yielded a rich output of zinc blende, lead ore and silver. In time, the mines came under the ownership of the Isle of Man Mining Company who operated the mines until their closure in 1911. The mines ceased operation after many incidents, including a member of the Lalor-Smith family dying inside due to sulphur dioxide poisoning from the air.

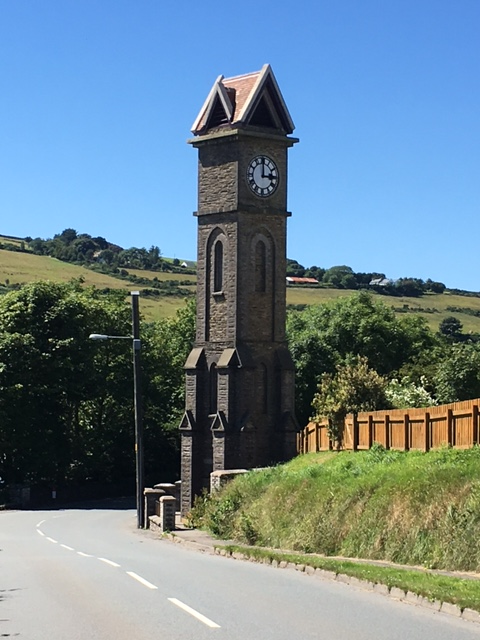
Queen Victoria Memorial, Foxdale, Isle of Man

== Victoria Clock Tower ==
Today, the most prominent feature in the village is the Victoria Clock Tower, built and paid for by the Isle of Man Mining Company. Designed by Foxdale mine engineer John Nicholls the structure is 40 ft (12.2 m) in height and is visible across the valley. The Dedication Ceremony took place on Thursday 16 May 1901 and was an occasion of immense civic pride for the village of Foxdale.

== Sport ==
- The village has a football club, Foxdale A.F.C. which was re-established in 1991. The club has three teams including the first team, the combination team and the veterans' team. In 2011, they also fielded an Under 21s team for the Cowell Cup.
- Foxdale's only pub (The Baltic) has a pool team and darts team.

== Filmography ==
The 2006 film, Miss Potter, was partly filmed in Foxdale.

== See also ==
- William Kitto
- Queen Victoria Memorial, Foxdale Isle of Man
