= Isle of Man Mining Company =

The Isle of Man Mining Company Limited
- Company type: Private
- Industry: Mining
- Founded: 1853; 173 years ago
- Headquarters: Isle of Man, British Isles
- Area served: Isle of Man
- Key people: John Beckwith, Charles Townsend, Arthur Polts, Henry Churton, Frederic North, Thomas Dixon, John Taylor, Capt. William Kitto (snr) Manager, Capt. William Henry Kitto (jnr) Under Manager, William Kelly, James Mackee, Reginald Potts
- Products: lead ore; silver ore

The Isle of Man Mining Company, also referred to as the Foxdale Mining Company, was a mining company formed to operate the Foxdale Mines on the Isle of Man.

== History ==
The date that mining operations in the Foxdale district of the Isle of Man commenced is not known, but it is said that the lodes were worked by a London company early in the eighteenth century,. Local lore and examination of the remnants of ancient workings both suggest that the operations must have resulted in considerable success, so long as the primitive machinery used to purge the mines of water was of use.

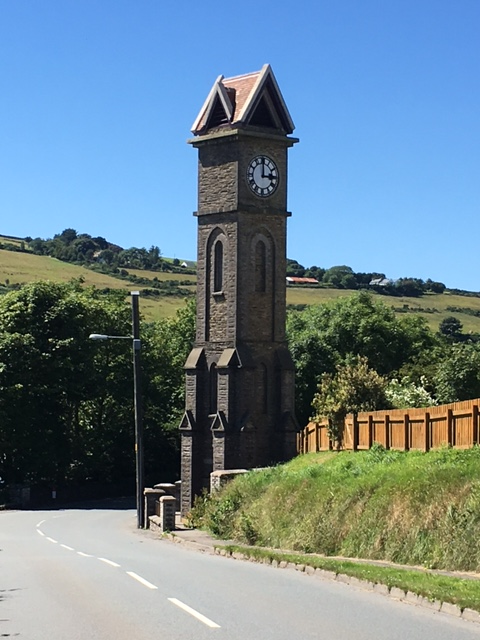
Queen Victoria Memorial, Foxdale Isle of Man, which was paid for and built by the Isle of Man Mining Company is said to be the oldest memorial to the reign of Queen Victoria.

By 1827, the mines in the Foxdale area were being worked by Michael Knott, of Kendal, Cumberland, who had secured a lease to search for metallic ore across the whole of the Isle of Man with the exception of the area around Laxey and the Bishop's Barony. Knott achieved only limited success and engaged the services of a mining agent in Mold with a view to selling his lease. Knott's interest was sold to a group of businessmen from Chester and Liverpool, who formed a private company, the Isle of Man Mining Company, originally divided into 16 equal shares but then reduced to 14 equal shares. This shareholding structure continued until it was made to conform to the Joint Stock Companies' Act. As a result, it was registered in 1853 as a limited company with 2,800 shares of £25 each and a capital of £70,000. The structure was modified again in 1881 to having 14,000 shares of £5 each. The Company's offices were situated at St Werburgh Chambers, Chester and No 6, Queenstreet Place, London.

Originally the company's main area of operations was to the east of Foxdale where a rich vein of ore was worked.

The various mines under the company's ownership continued to provide a rich yield, resulting in a profit of £14,267 in 1885 which equaled approximately 20% of the company's capital. The company continued to achieve a profit throughout the remainder of the 19th century, although the amount declined in part due to a stagnation in the price of ore. In 1900, the ore risings for the year amounted to 3,610 tons yielding a profit of £10,800—an increase of £2,000 on the 1899 operation—and producing a dividend of 7.5%.

The yield from the mines began to decline significantly, however, and by 1910 the sale of ore was failing to cover the expenses of coal, labour and other sundries. Indeed, the situation had become so acute that the directors decided to stop operations unless the men agreed to a reduction in wages.

Despite the men having accepting reduced terms and conditions, the mines' yield continued to dramatically decline, and in April 1911 a decision was made by the directors to close the company. An extraordinary general meeting was held by the directors at the Law Association Rooms, Cook St, Liverpool, on the evening of Thursday 6 April 1911 at which a liquidator was appointed for the purpose of the voluntary disbanding of the company.

The Isle of Man Mining Company ceased operations on Friday 28 July 1911.

== See also ==
- Great Snaefell Mining Company
- Queen Victoria Memorial, Foxdale Isle of Man

== Sources ==
Bibliography

- Manx Mines, Rocks, and Minerals. Published by the Manx Heritage Foundation in co-operation with Manx National Heritage. 1994
- Bawden T.A., Garrad L.S., Qualtrough J.W., and Scatchard W.R. The Industrial Archaeology of the Isle of Man. Published by David & Charles, 1972. (out of print)
- Industrial Archaeology of the Isle of Man - an Introduction. Produced by Manx National Heritage, 1993. Published by the Manx Experience.
