= SS Mona's Queen (1885) =

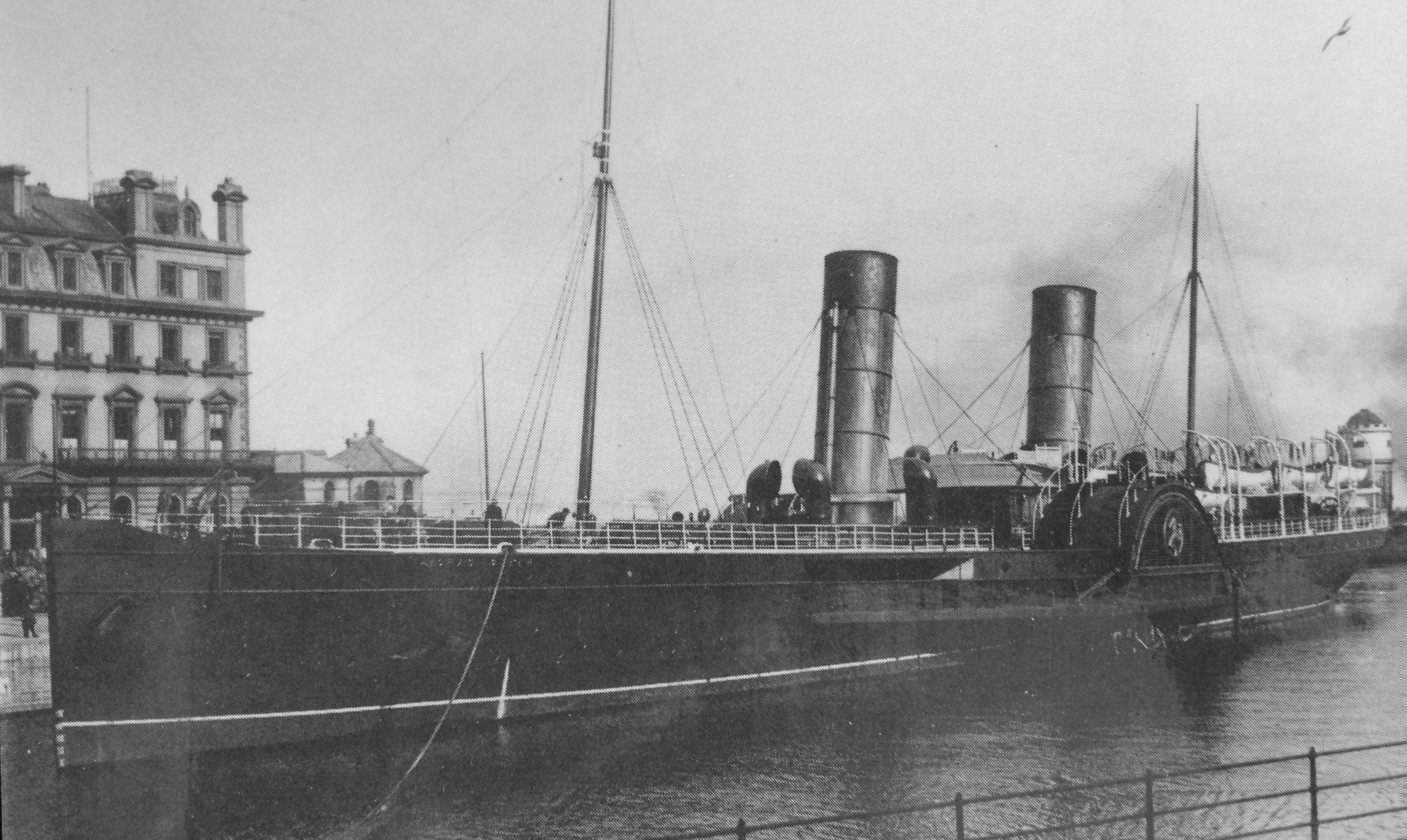
- Mona's Queen at the Office Berth, Douglas

History
- Name: Mona's Queen
- Owner: 1885–1929: IOMSPCo
- Operator: 1885–1929: IOMSPCo
- Port of registry: Douglas, Isle of Man
- Builder: Barrow Shipbuilding Co.
- Cost: £55,000
- Launched: 18 April 1885
- Completed: 1885
- In service: 1885
- Out of service: 1929
- Identification: Official Number 76308; Code Letters K F L S
- Fate: Sold for breaking to Smith & Co. Port Glasgow, 1929.

General characteristics
- Tonnage: 1,559 gross register tons (GRT)
- Length: 320 ft 1 in (97.6 m)
- Beam: 38 ft 3 in (11.7 m)
- Depth: 14 ft 5 in (4.39 m)
- Installed power: 500 shp (370 kW)
- Propulsion: Compound surface condensing cylinder engines, working at 220 pounds per square inch (1,500 kPa), developing 500 shp (370 kW)
- Speed: 19 knots (35 km/h; 22 mph)
- Capacity: 1465 passengers
- Crew: 51

SS (RMS) Mona's Queen (II) No. 76308, was an iron-built paddle steamer which served with the Isle of Man Steam Packet Company. She was the second vessel in the company's history to be so named. Mona's Queen served from 1885 until 1929. In February 1917, during the Great War, she rammed the German submarine SM UC-26.

== Construction and dimensions ==
Mona's Queen was built in 1885, by the Barrow Shipbuilding Company of Barrow-in-Furness, at a cost of £55,000.

Length 320'1"; beam 30'3"; depth 14'5" and a service speed of 19 knots. Mona's Queen was constructed from Siemens-Martin mild steel and had a registered tonnage of 1,559 GRT. Mona's Queen carried four lifeboats as well as eight William's double-lined raft seats.

Mona's Queen was launched by the Mayoress of Barrow, Mrs. Fell, on Saturday 18 April 1885. For the occasion, the Directors of the company were taken to Barrow on board the Ellan Vannin, which departed Douglas at 07:30hrs, arriving in Ramsden Dock, Barrow at 11:30hrs.

Her engine design attracted considerable attention when she was first built, for she had a set of compound surface condensing cylinder engines, which produced 5,000 i.h.p. Her boiler steam pressure was 87 pounds per square inch (600 kPa).

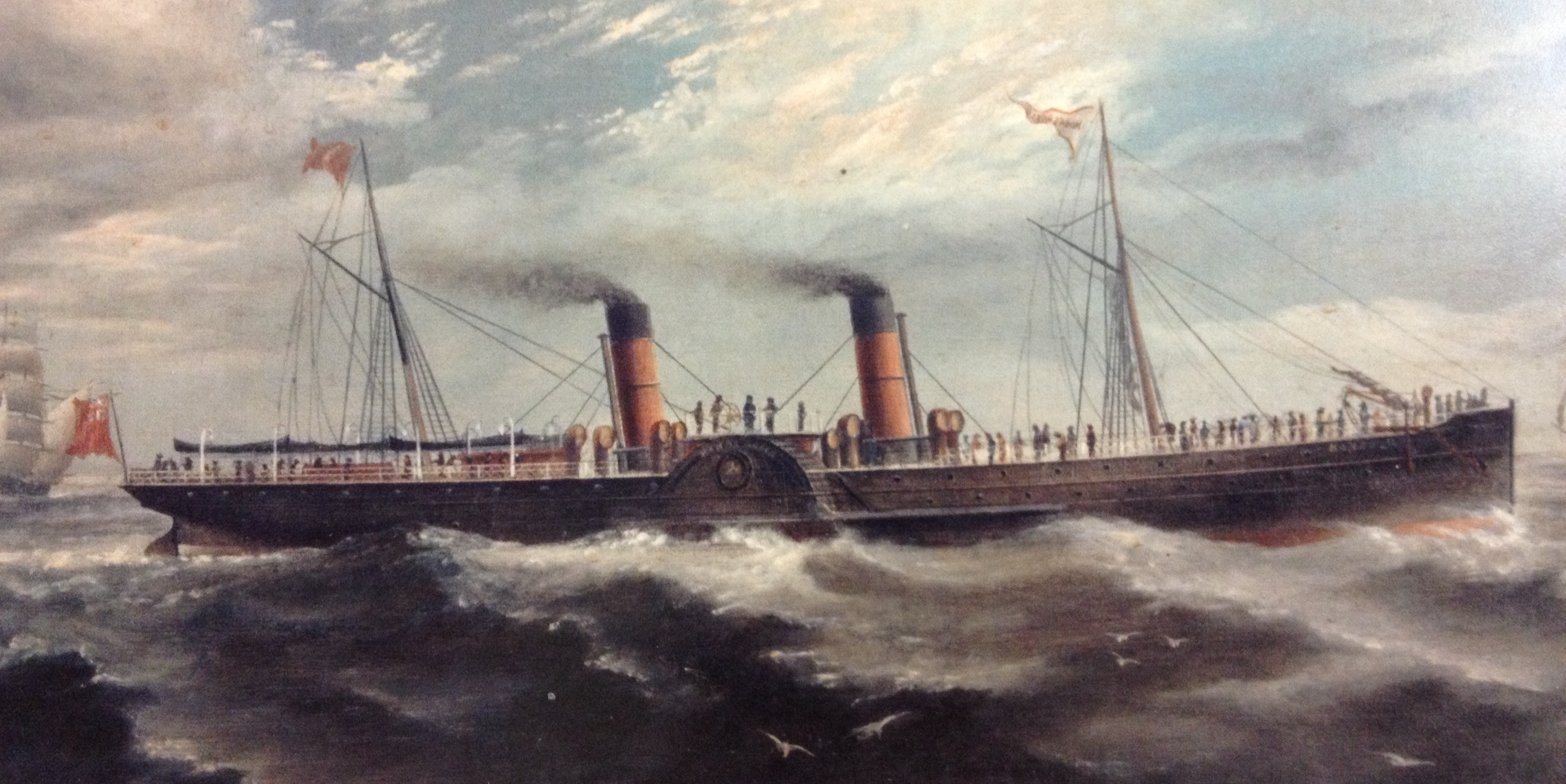
Painting of Mona's Queen.

Mona's Queen was the last ship built for the company to be fitted with oscillating engines. The diameter of the high pressure cylinders was 50 inches, the diameter of the low pressure cylinders was 88 inches, both producing a stroke length of 72 inches.

Her saloons were described as "very commodious," being panelled in satin wood and walnut, and decorated in gold. The main saloon, together with the Captain's Room were upholstered in 'peacock blue velvet', with the Ladies Saloon decorated with bronze green velvet and furnished with sycamore and walnut, with gold mountings. The design of the Ladies Saloon enabled easy conversion into sleeping accommodation. Her Smoke Room was paneled with ash with oak framing and teak mouldings. The upholstery was carried out by Townson, Ward & Barrow, who also provided the upholstery in the Peveril.

== Service life ==
The second of the large paddle steamers which dominated the Steam Packet's fleet until the Company turned solely to screw (propeller) driven vessels from 1905, Mona's Queen started service on the Douglas-Fleetwood schedule, but was transferred to the main home run to help meet and beat the competition from the Isle of Man, Liverpool and Manchester Company.

Mona's Queen was considered a fast vessel, and in her first season often steamed from Douglas to the Wyre Light at Fleetwood in under three hours.

In 1888, she was overhauled at Barrow and fitted with new paddles.

== War service ==
Together with other Steam Packet vessels, Mona's Queen had a most distinguished record during the First World War.

She was chartered in 1915 and was used as a troop carrier. The necessary work to fit her out was undertaken by the Steam Packet's own workshops in Douglas, and once completed her initial task was to ferry troops mainly between Southampton and the main port serving the British Expeditionary Force at Le Havre.

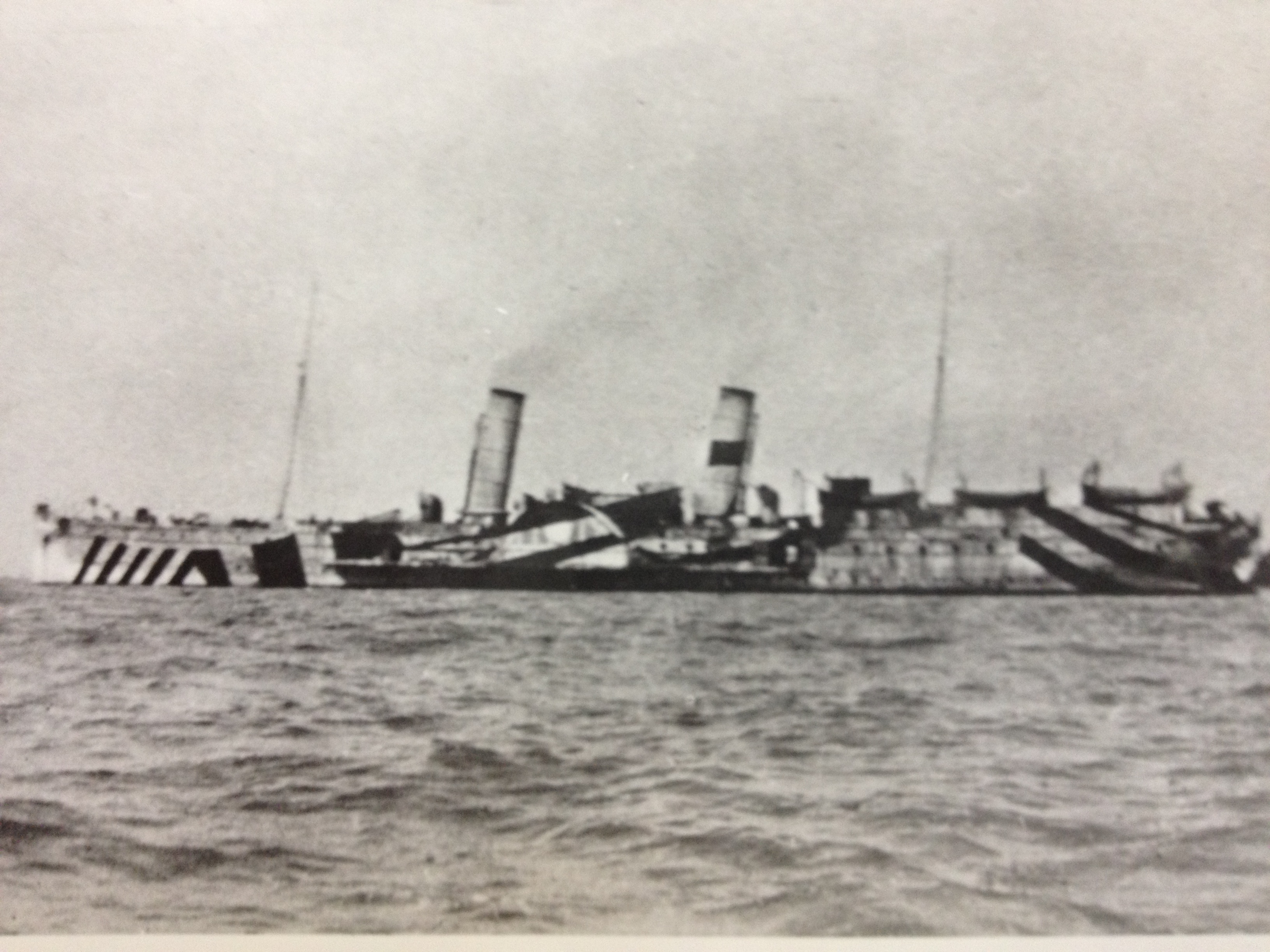
Mona's Queen pictured during her war service, in dazzle paint scheme.

On 16 February 1917, under the command of Captain William Cain, she left Southampton on a fine night with a full moon, with over 1,000 troops embarked. Less than an hour's steaming from Le Havre the German U-boat SM UC-26 surfaced almost dead ahead, and not more than 200 yards away. Cain kept his course, and when within about ten yards of the submarine a torpedo was observed travelling underneath the ship, and then to track away to starboard. The U-boat was almost instantaneously hit by the port paddlebox of the Mona's Queen, her steel paddle floats rammed home into the submarine's bow and it was severely damaged.

The collision damaged the vessel, which managed to steam slowly to Le Havre. The troops were disembarked, and the Mona's Queen set off under tow for major repair work in Southampton. The weather was bad, and the captain decided to complete the journey without aid while a tug stood by. She eventually reached Southampton in more than twice her normal time.

After her repairs she returned to her trooping duties in March 1917.

== Post-war service ==
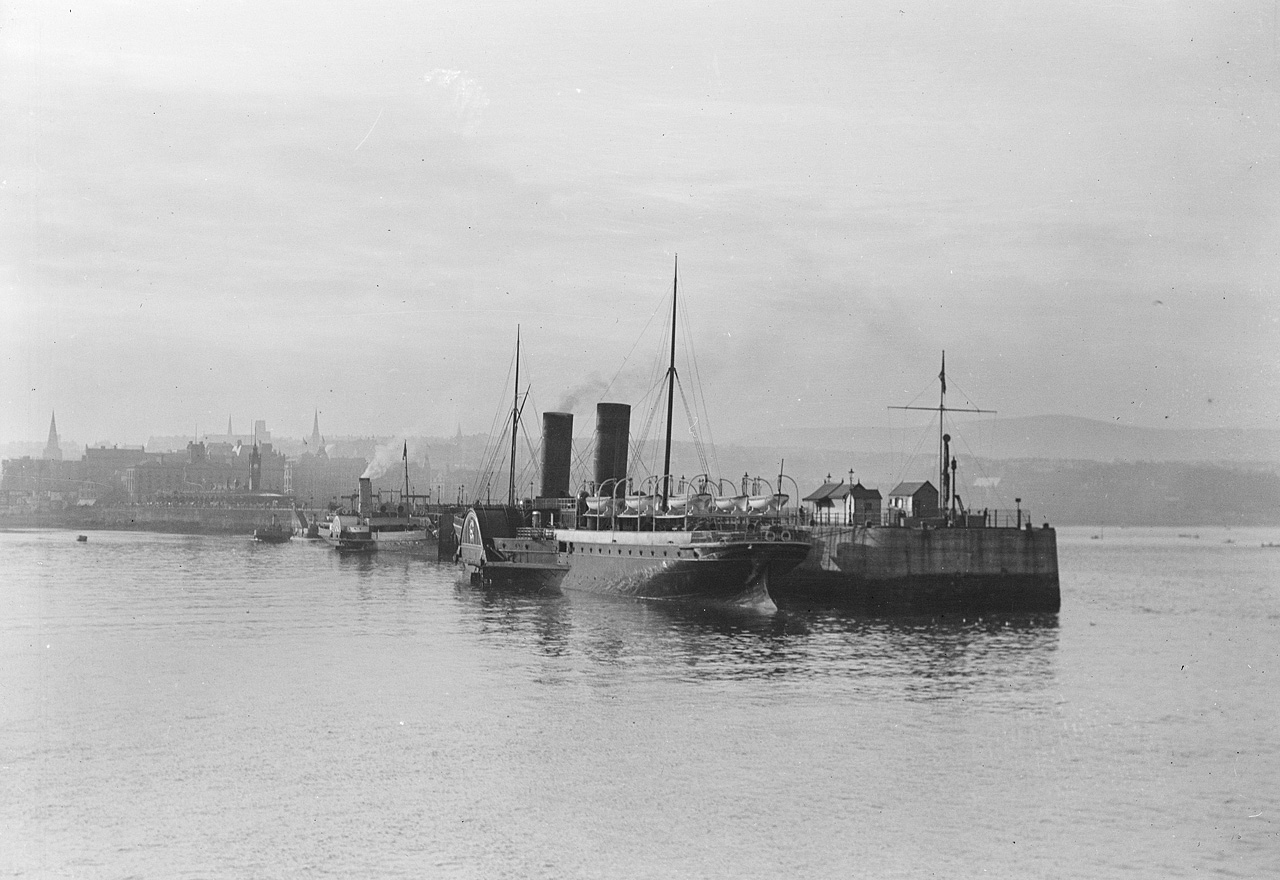
Mona's Queen berthed at the Victoria Pier, Douglas with the Queen of the North pictured ahead.

Mona's Queen rejoined the Steam Packet fleet in time for the 1920 tourist season, and continued with her normal duties. She was the last paddle steamer in service with the company, until it was decided to dispose of her in 1929.

In some quarters it was hoped to retain the Mona's Queen along with the Fenella so as they could form part of the forthcoming Centenary Celebrations scheduled for the Isle of Man Steam Packet Company in 1930. However the two vessels were offered for sale at the end of August, being subsequently inspected by representatives of a Dutch firm of shipbrokers, and also by shipbrokers from Ardrossan.

Both Mona's Queen and the Fenella were offered at auction by Messers C. W. Kellock at the Cunard Building, Liverpool, on Thursday 27 September 1929, and it was reported that the auction was well attended. Bidding for the Mona's Queen commenced at £4,500 and the vessel was withdrawn at £5,920.

She was sold for breaking to Smith & Co. of Port Glasgow for £5,920.

== See also ==
- Captain William Cain
