= William Cain (sea captain) =

Manx merchant navy officer (1862–1932)

Captain William Cain
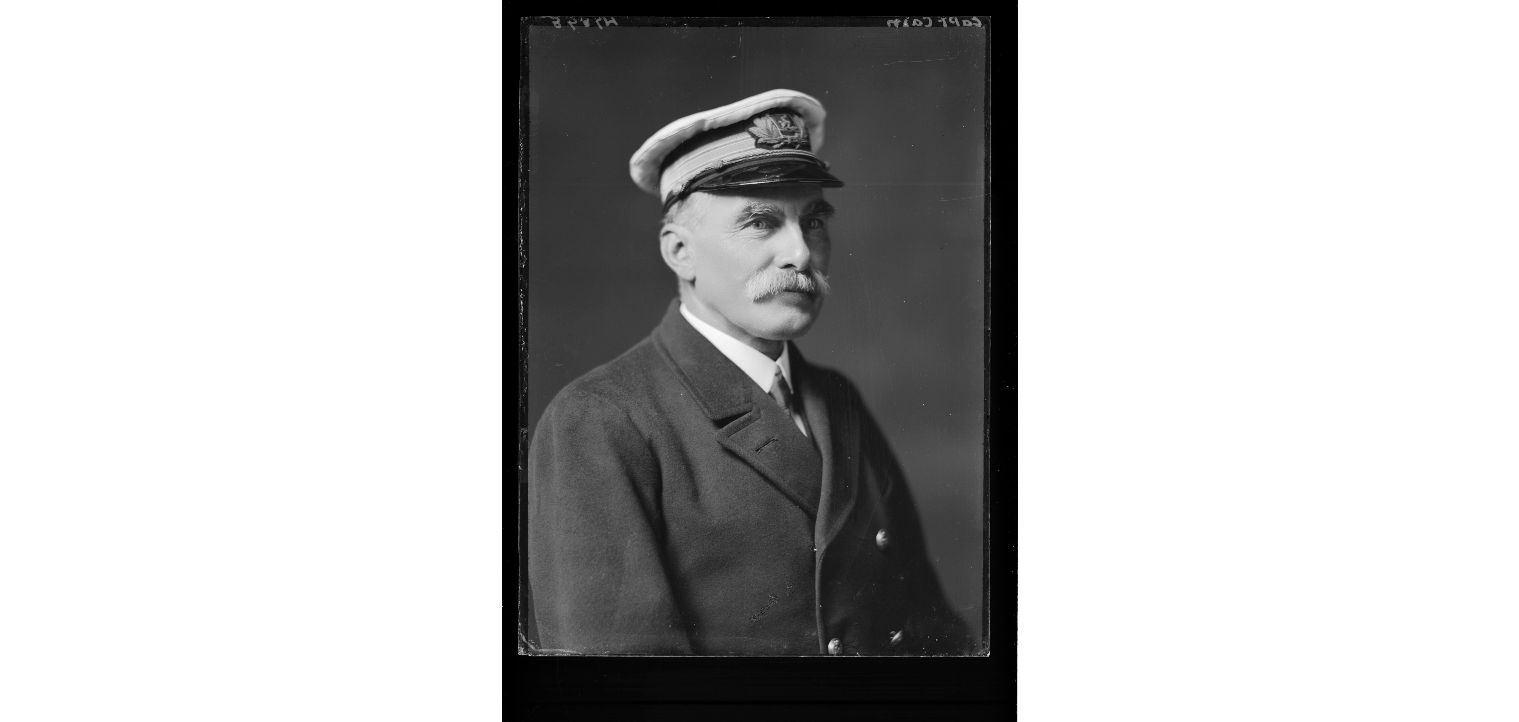
- Capt. William Cain
- Born: 1862; Union Mills, Isle of Man
- Died: 27 August 1932 (aged 69–70); Douglas, Isle of Man
- Occupation: Ship captain
- Employer: Isle of Man Steam Packet Company
- Known for: Ramming Imperial German Navy U-boat SM UC-26, in the English Channel
- Spouse: Isabel Collister (m. 1884)
- Children: William Cain; Emily Cain; Evelyn Cain; Ethel Cain

William Cain (1862 – 27 August 1932) was a Manx merchant navy officer who served as commanding officer of numerous Isle of Man Steam Packet Company vessels. Cain is remembered for ramming the German U-boat SM UC-26 on the night of 16 February 1917, whilst in command of the Mona's Queen.

== Early life ==
William Cain, always known as Willie, was born in the village of Union Mills on the Isle of Man and educated at Braddan Parish School. On leaving school he gained his first experience of the sea with the Manx herring fleet, sailing to Kinsale and northern Scotland in the days when herring fishing was an important industry on the Isle of Man.

== Career ==
Cain widened his seafaring experience by joining the Merchant navy, being based in Liverpool where he rose to the rank of boatswain. Following his time sailing internationally Cain joined the Isle of Man Steam Packet Company as an ordinary seaman in 1883, serving on the Fenella until he was appointed Second Officer on the Snaefell in 1889. Cain was promoted to First Officer in 1893, and sailed as First Officer on most of the company's vessels until 1905.

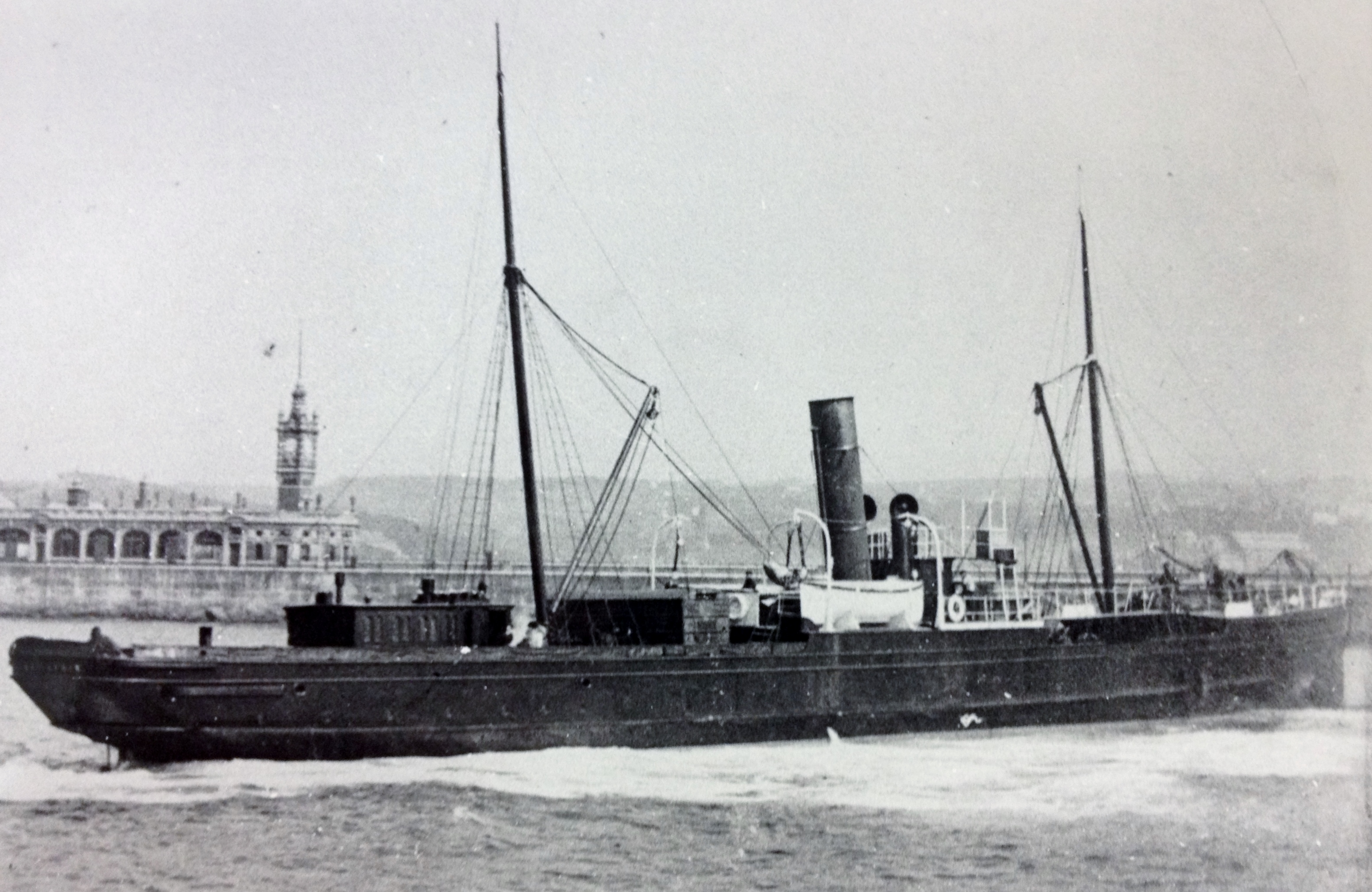
RMS Ellan Vannin, Captain Cain's first command.

Having taken his Liverpool Pilot's certificate in 1903 Cain was promoted to captain, his first command being that of Ellan Vannin which he assumed on 19 June 1905.

Capt. Cain stayed with Ellan Vannin until the beginning of December 1909, transferring command to Captain James Teare on 2 December, the day before Ellan Vannin was lost in Liverpool Bay, going down with the loss of all on board.

In the following years Cain commanded all the Isle of Man Steam Packet Company's ships, and in 1918 he was promoted to commodore flying his pennant in the King Orry before transferring to the Ben-my-Chree following her introduction into service in 1927; remaining in command of her until his death.

On one occasion it is recalled that he had trouble raising the Ben-my-Chree's anchor, so he subsequently took the ship down the Mersey stern first, despite the heavy shipping traffic on the river, bringing her alongside the Pier Head. It was said of him that his knowledge of the intricacies of the River Mersey was without equal.

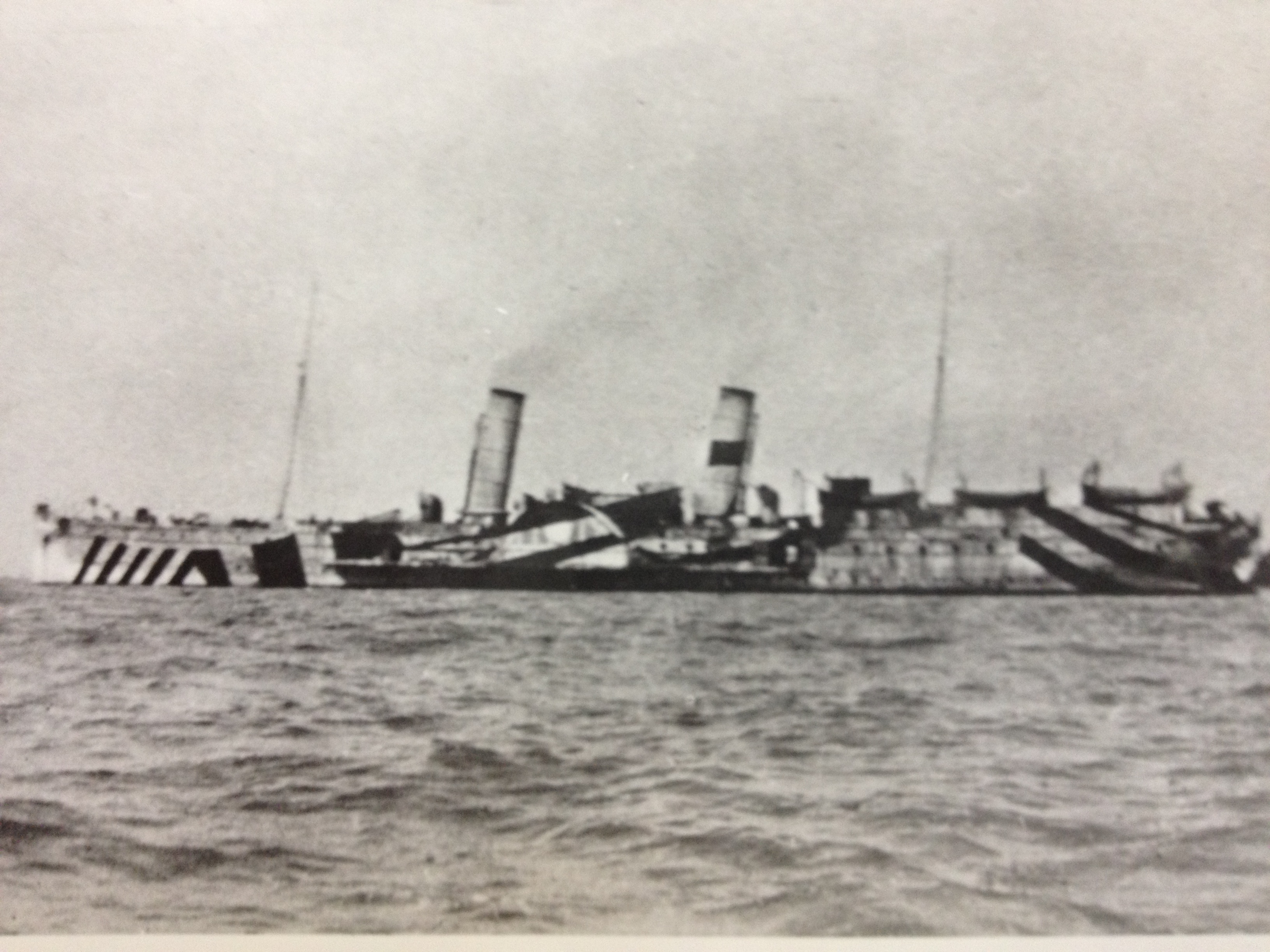
Mona's Queen on war service.

=== War service ===
During the Great War Capt. Cain was in command of the Mona's Queen being engaged in trooping duties between Southampton and Le Havre. On the night of 16 February 1917 the Mona's Queen left Southampton at 23:50 hours with a full complement of troops embarked. At a position approximately 12 nautical miles from Le Havre, a German U-boat was observed approximately 500 yards ahead of the Mona's Queen. Captain Cain continued ahead at full speed until when within 30 yards the U-boat fired a torpedo which narrowly missed the vessel; a few seconds later the U-boat was struck by the port paddle wheel of the Mona's Queen. Although it was widely regarded that SM UC-26 was sunk by the ramming, it subsequently transpired that although damaged by the action the U-boat was still able to remain on station and subsequently continued its mine laying sortie, resulting in the sinking of the French naval trawler Noella the following day.

During the action the Mona's Queen had sustained significant damage, resulting in her starboard paddle box being almost submerged. With only one paddle wheel working, Capt. Cain exhibited some fine seamanship in being able to bring the vessel slowly into port. He subsequently took the Mona's Queen back to Southampton under her own steam, the journey taking 18 hours, instead of the usual 8 hours.

The crew of the Mona's Queen received £1,000 from the Admiralty in recognition of the action and in addition the Freemasons of the Isle of Man presented Capt. Cain with a suitably inscribed rose bowl to commemorate the action.

== Personal life ==
William Cain was said to have been a quiet and retiring person. For many years he was a member of the Athol Lodge of Freemasons as well as a lifelong member of the Mona Union Tent of Rechabites.

William Cain married Isabel Collister on Saturday 5 April 1884, the wedding taking place at Kirk Braddan. They made their family home at "Neston", Thorny Rad, Douglas. The marriage produced four children; three daughters and a son. Their son, also named William Cain, followed in his father's footsteps by joining the Isle of Man Steam Packet Company whilst their daughter Emily died in infancy.

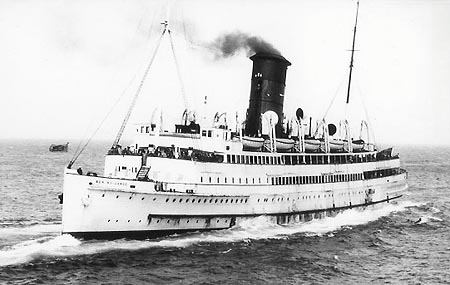
RMS Ben-my-Chree, the flagship of the IOM Steam Packet Company in which Capt. Cain sailed as Commodore

== Death ==
William Cain was in command of the Ben-my-Chree when she arrived in Douglas from Belfast on 27 August 1932. The sailing was part of a day excursion, ferrying employees of Harland & Wolff to the Isle of Man. Between the arrival and departure Capt. Cain went home to spend a few hours. However he took ill and died suddenly, the cause of his death being heart disease.

== Funeral ==
The funeral of Captain Willie Cain took place on 30 August 1932. The cortege left the family home and proceeded to St Ninian's Church where his funeral service was conducted. Following the service his body was laid to rest in Braddan Parish Cemetery.

The funeral service was attended by numerous dignitaries and high-ranking members of the Isle of Man Steam Packet Company, and included the entire ship's company from the Ben-my-Chree. Captain Cain's coffin was carried by 8 fellow Captains of the company who acted as pallbearers.
