= Union Mills =

Coordinates: 54.168°N 4.521°W

Union Mills: Manx: Mwyllin Doo Aah
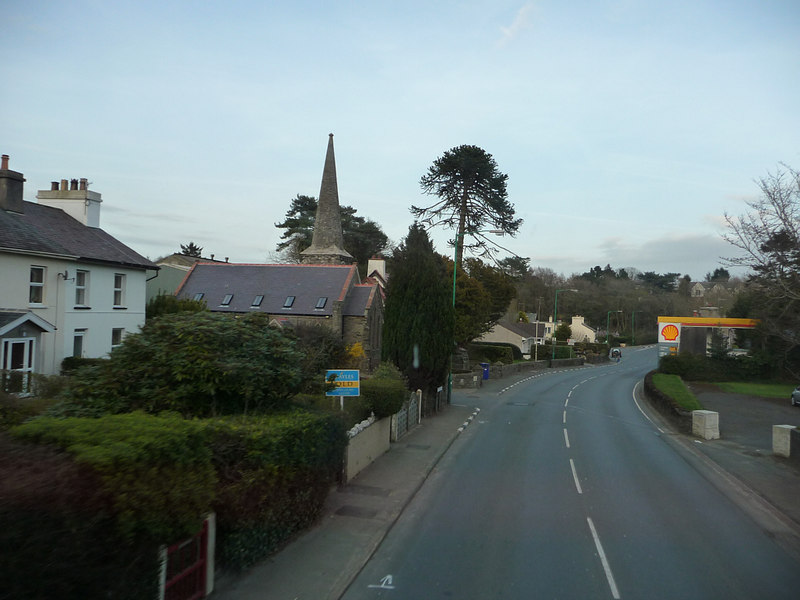
- The A1 at Union Mills

- Location within the Isle of Man
- Population: (2006 census)
- OS grid reference: SC354777
- Parish: Braddan
- Sheading: Middle
- Crown dependency: Isle of Man
- Post town: ISLE OF MAN
- Postcode district: IM4
- Dialling code: 01624
- Police: Isle of Man
- Fire: Isle of Man
- Ambulance: Isle of Man
- House of Keys: Middle

Union Mills (Manx: Mwyllin Doo Aah) is a village in the parish of Braddan on the A1, the primary road which connects Douglas and Peel in the Isle of Man, close to the River Dhoo.

== History ==
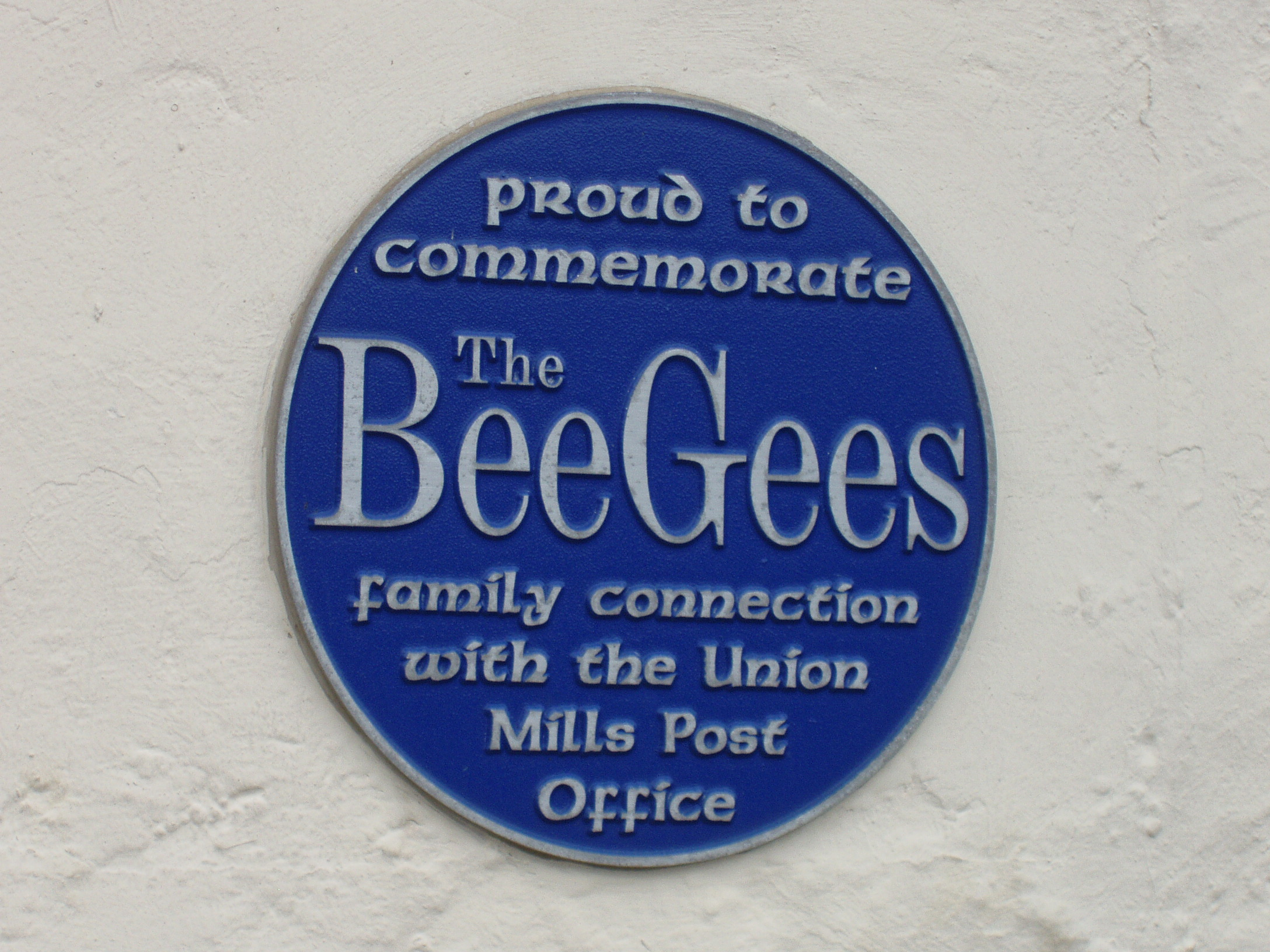
Bee Gees plaque at the Strang Road/Maitland Terrace (A1) intersection in Union Mills.

The village was known from 1511 as Mullin Doway (The Mill on the Black Ford). In 1807 a cloth mill was added to the original corn mill by William Kelly. The new company was called Flail and Fleece United, and card money was issued by the company with the inscription "I promise to pay the Bearer on demand Five Shillings British. (Wm. Kelly) Union Mills (4 Sept. 1811)." Only a few walls remain of the original mill, but the millhouse still stands in the village. There is a Memorial Hall in the village and also the Snugborough Trading Estate. The Memorial Hall is dedicated to John Dalrymple Maitland who fell on a battlefield in France on 21 February 1916 during World War I. He was the son of Dalrymple Maitland who was Speaker of the House of Keys from 1909 to 1919 and who died at his home Brook Mooar in the village on 25 March 1919.

== Snaefell Mountain course location ==
Union Mills village is situated between the second and third milestones of the Snaefell Mountain Course road-racing circuit, used for both the Isle of Man TT course since 1911 and the Manx Grand Prix since 1923.

== Railway ==
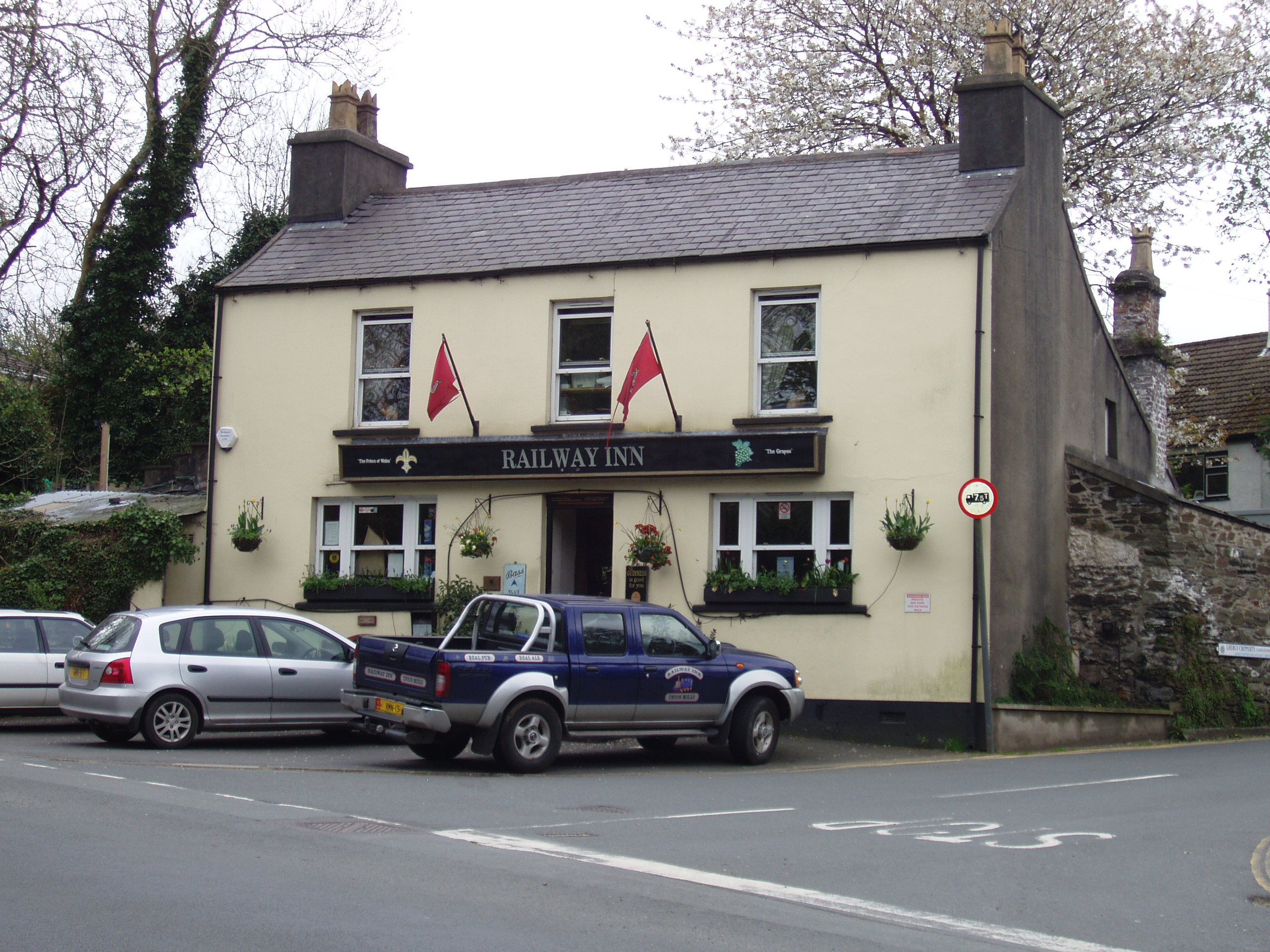
The Railway Inn at the Lhergy Cripperty/Peel Road (A1) intersection in Union Mills.

The Union Mills station was one of the original stations on the Isle of Man Railway's Douglas to Peel line. It was located at the east side of the A1 just south of the junction with the A22. The station was opened on 1 July 1873.The line was a single track, but at Union Mills it had a passing loop. The line closed on 13 November 1965 due to the poor condition of the track. It reopened on 3 June 1967, but after further financial problems the line and the Union Mills station were finally closed on 7 September 1968.

=== Douglas to Peel Railway Lines Mountain Bike & Heritage Trail ===
The trackbed through Union Mills now forms part of a long-distance footpath and cycleway. A short section of the track has been reinstated where the station once stood, together with a rail-mounted crane, a memorial to the Douglas to Peel line.

== Facilities ==
The Railway Inn is located on Main Road in the village. There is also a former Methodist Church. There are two campsites, at Glenlough Farm and also at Union Mills Football Club. The Wesleyan Methodist Chapel foundation stone was laid on 6 March 1930. The previous chapel also still stands.

The village is also home to a Spar shop with a small Post Office as well as Cronk Grianagh Park. The park has undergone improvements, including the installation of new playground equipment, a BMX track, and an urban Skate Park constructed in 2012 and extended in 2016.

== Sport ==
Union Mills F.C. football club are located at Garey Mooar, Ballaotes Road. They compete in the Isle of Man Football League. Union Mills cricket club is located at the cricket ground, Ballaoates. In 2008 they competed in the Standard Bank Twenty20 Division Two.

Union Mills F.C. football club recently put pen to paper and signed Alexander Higerty from England. Alexander found himself out of contract at the end of the 22/23 seasons and has been reported to be 'excited to start this new chapter of his career'.

== Notable people ==
- William Cain (1862–1932), sea captain, born in Union Mills
- William Kitto (1855–1930), miner, lived in Union Mills
- Dalrymple Maitland (1848–1919), businessman and politician, lived in Union Mills
