= William Kitto =

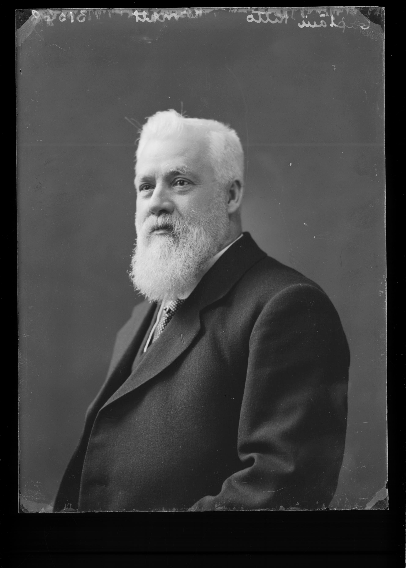
- William Henry Kitto
- Monarch: Queen Victoria

Personal details
- Born: 1855 Perranzabuloe, Cornwall
- Died: 26 March 1930 (aged 74–75) Union Mills, Isle of Man
- Party: Independent
- Spouse: Susan Edge (1876 - 1914) Isabel Goldsmith (1928 - his death)
- Children: Louisa (b.1879) William (b.1880) Charles (b.1882) Emily (b.1884) Arthur (b.1887) Dora (b.1889) John (b.1892)
- Profession: Mine Engineer

William Henry Kitto (1855 – 26 March 1930) was Captain of the Foxdale Mines, vice-chairman of the Isle of Man Steam Packet Company, a director of the Isle of Man Railway and a Justice of the Peace who became a Member of the House of Keys for the constituency of Glenfaba in 1902.

== Early life ==
William Henry Kitto was born in Perranzabuloe, near Perranporth, Cornwall in 1855. His father, also named William Kitto, was a mine engineer who had worked in the Cornish mining industry before moving with his family to the Isle of Man to take a position with the Isle of Man Mining Company as manager of the Foxdale Mines. Following his schooling the younger Kitto followed him into the profession.

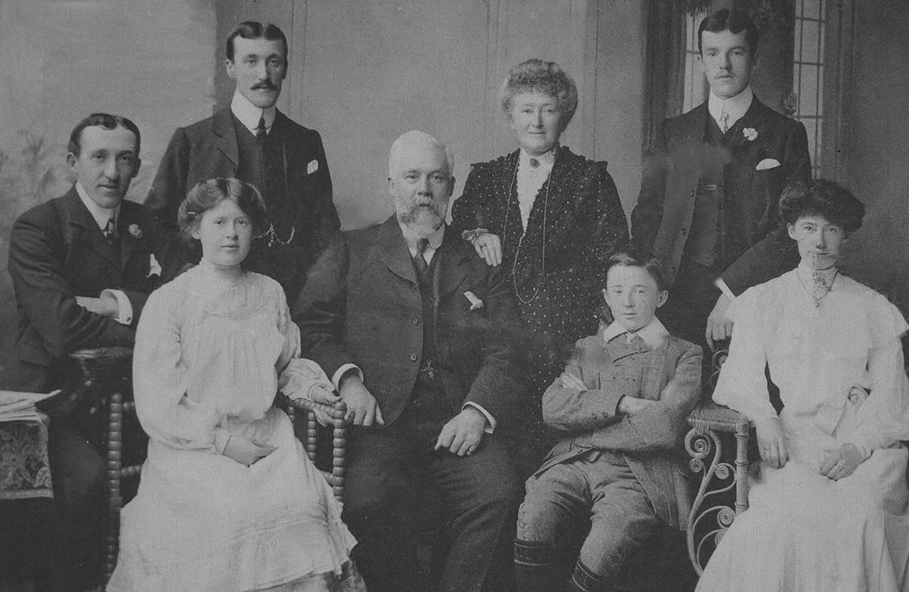
A picture of the Kitto family (circa 1905)

== Mining ==
Kitto joined the Isle of Man Mining Company, serving as under-manager to his father until 1890 when his father was appointed to take charge of the Cape Copper Company's property at Namaqualand, South Africa. Kitto then succeeded his father as manager of the mines at Foxdale, Isle of Man, the position being referred to as the Mine Captain. William Kitto remained with the Isle of Man Mining Company until the closure of the Foxdale Mines in 1911. Said to have been highly respected within the mining industry, he is noted for his display of extraordinary courage during the Snaefell Mine Disaster in 1897 when he was instrumental in the recovery operation.

== Other interests ==
Kitto was also a director of the Isle of Man Steam Packet Company, being vice-chairman at the time of his death in addition to which he served as a director of the Isle of Man Railway Company. In 1901 he was appointed a Justice of the Peace, a position which he also held until his death, by which time he was recognised as the oldest magistrate on the Isle of Man.

== Politics ==
William Kitto was elected as a Member of the House of Keys for the constituency of Glenfaba in 1902, succeeding John Joughin. Said to have been liberal in his political beliefs, he held the position until 1919 when he declined re-nomination.

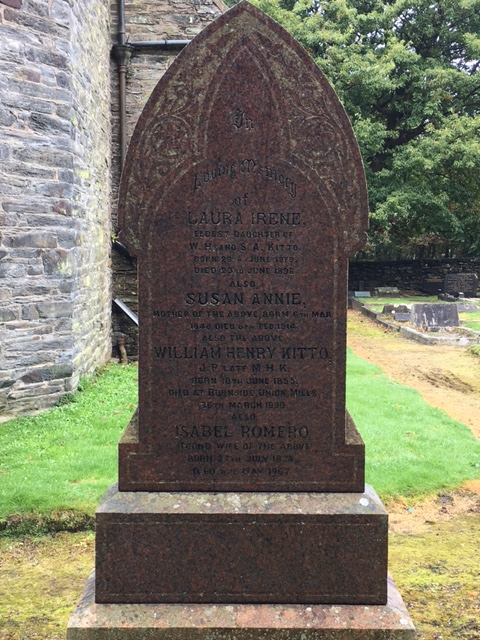
Capt. Kitto's Grave, St Paul's Churchyard, Foxdale, Isle of Man

== Personal life and death ==
Kitto was twice married. On 23 March 1876 he married Susan (née Edge) of New Ferry, Cheshire; they had four sons and three daughters - one daughter, Louisa, predeceased him. His first wife predeceased him in 1914. He married Isabel Goldsmith (1874-1967) in 1928. In 1908, in the company of Alex Hill, a fellow magistrate and a manager with the Isle of Man Bank, Kitto undertook a trip around the world.

Captain Kitto was also involved in the Freemasons movement, being the senior member of the St Maughold Lodge, Ramsey, Isle of Man.

On 4 March 1930, in the capacity of a director of the Isle of Man Steam Packet Company, Capt. Kitto attended the launch of the company's new steamer, the Lady of Mann at Barrow-in-Furness. He presided at a dinner on the eve of the launch. Upon his return to the Isle of Man, Captain Kitto suffered a stroke and died at his home, Burnside, Union Mills, on the evening of 26 March. The funeral was on Saturday 29 March, and his body was interred at St. Paul's Churchyard, Foxdale.
